= Grant Township, Sherman County, Kansas =

Township in Sherman County, Kansas, U.S.

Grant Township
- Township
- Location in Sherman County
- Coordinates: 39°29′00″N 101°56′32″W
- Country: United States
- State: Kansas
- County: Sherman

Area
  - Total: 136.949 sq mi (354.70 km^{2})
  - Land: 136.916 sq mi (354.61 km^{2})
  - Water: 0.033 sq mi (0.085 km^{2}) 0.02%
- Elevation: 3,812 ft (1,162 m)

Population (2020)
  - Total: 74
  - Density: 0.54/sq mi (0.21/km^{2})
- Time zone: UTC-7 (MST)
  - Summer (DST): UTC-6 (MDT)
- ZIP Code: 67735, 67741
- Area code: 785
- GNIS feature ID: 0485216

Grant Township is one of thirteen townships in Sherman County, Kansas, United States. As of the 2020 census, its population was 74.

== History ==
Grant Township was home to the extinct town of Neville, whose post office was in operation from 1888 to 1893 and from 1895 to 1909, and the extinct town of Rhine, whose post office was in operation from 1898 to 1899 and from 1901 to 1909. Rhine's final recorded population was 15, in 1910.

== Geography ==
Grant Township is located in the northwestern corner of the county, along the Colorado border.

It lies northwest of the county seat of Goodland. There are no communities in the township.

Several intermittent headwaters of Beaver Creek, a tributary of the Republican River, are located in Grant Township.

=== Adjacent townships ===
Benkelman Township, Cheyenne County
Jaqua Township, Cheyenne County	northwest	north	northeast	Wano Township, Cheyenne County
Kit Carson County, Colorado	west	self	east	Voltaire Township, Sherman County
Stateline Township, Sherman County	southwest	south	southeast	Logan Township, Sherman County
Lincoln Township, Sherman County

== Transportation ==
Only local roads are located in Grant Township. A small airport, Wright International Airport, lies in the township's southwest.

== Government ==
As an active township, Grant Township is governed by a three-member board, composed of the township trustee, the township treasurer, and the township clerk. The trustee acts as the township executive.
