= Voltaire Township, Kansas =

Township in Sherman County, Kansas, U.S.

Voltaire Township
- Township
- Location in Sherman County
- Coordinates: 39°28′30″N 101°40′32″W
- Country: United States
- State: Kansas
- County: Sherman

Area
  - Total: 158.839 sq mi (411.39 km^{2})
  - Land: 158.832 sq mi (411.37 km^{2})
  - Water: 0.007 sq mi (0.018 km^{2}) 0%

Population (2020)
  - Total: 265
  - Density: 1.67/sq mi (0.644/km^{2})
- Time zone: UTC-7 (MST)
  - Summer (DST): UTC-6 (MDT)
- Area code: 785
- GNIS feature ID: 485217

Voltaire Township is one of thirteen townships in Sherman County, Kansas, United States. As of the 2020 census, its population was 265.

== Geography ==
Voltaire Township is located in the northern part of the county.

The largest township in Sherman County, it lies north of the county seat of Goodland. While part of Goodland lies within the township's original boundaries, the city is not part of the township. There are no communities in the township proper.

Some intermittent headwaters of Beaver Creek, a tributary of the Republican River, flow through Voltaire Township.

=== Adjacent townships ===
Wano Township, Cheyenne County
		north	northeast	Bird City Township, Cheyenne County
Grant Township, Sherman County	west	self	east	Shermanville Township, Sherman County
Lincoln Township, Sherman County	southwest	south	southeast	Washington Township, Sherman County
Itasca Township, Sherman County; Logan Township, Sherman County

== Transportation ==
K-27, a north–south highway, is the only significant road in Voltaire Township. Goodland Municipal Airport, a general aviation field, lies in the southern part of the township, near Goodland.

== Government ==
As an active township, Voltaire Township is governed by a three-member board, composed of the township trustee, the township treasurer, and the township clerk. The trustee acts as the township executive.
