= Logan Township, Sherman County, Kansas =

Township in Sherman County, Kansas, U.S.

Logan Township
- Township
- Location in Sherman County
- Coordinates: 39°19′45″N 101°47′02″W
- Country: United States
- State: Kansas
- County: Sherman

Area
  - Total: 53.175 sq mi (137.72 km^{2})
  - Land: 53.175 sq mi (137.72 km^{2})
  - Water: 0 sq mi (0 km^{2}) 0%

Population (2020)
  - Total: 202
  - Density: 3.80/sq mi (1.47/km^{2})
- Time zone: UTC-7 (MST)
  - Summer (DST): UTC-6 (MDT)
- Area code: 785
- GNIS feature ID: 471180

Logan Township is one of thirteen townships in Sherman County, Kansas, United States. As of the 2020 census, its population was 202.

== Geography ==
Logan Township is located in the center of the county.

It lies west of the county seat of Goodland. While part of Goodland lies within the township's original boundaries, the city is not part of the township. There are no incorporated communities in the township proper, but the unincorporated community of Caruso lies in the township.

Several intermittent headwaters of Beaver and Sappa creeks flow through Logan Township.

=== Adjacent townships ===
Grant Township, Sherman County	northwest		northeast	Voltaire Township, Sherman County
Lincoln Township, Sherman County	west	self	east	Itasca Township, Sherman County
		south
Smoky Township, Sherman County

== Transportation ==
Interstate 70 and U.S. Route 24 travel east–west through Logan Township, and K-27 runs north–south along the border with Itasca Township. A railroad line also travels east–west through Logan Township, just north of the interstate.

== Government ==
As an active township, Logan Township is governed by a three-member board, composed of the township trustee, the township treasurer, and the township clerk. The trustee acts as the township executive.
