= Bird City =

Bird City may refer to:

- Bird City (wildfowl refuge) in Louisiana, United States
- Bird City, Kansas, United States
- Bird City Township, Cheyenne County, Kansas, United States
