= Lincoln Township, Sherman County, Kansas =

Township in Sherman County, Kansas, U.S.

Lincoln Township
- Township
- Location in Sherman County
- Coordinates: 39°19′02″N 101°53′04″W
- Country: United States
- State: Kansas
- County: Sherman

Area
  - Total: 71.855 sq mi (186.10 km^{2})
  - Land: 71.832 sq mi (186.04 km^{2})
  - Water: 0.023 sq mi (0.060 km^{2}) 0.03%

Population (2020)
  - Total: 91
  - Density: 1.3/sq mi (0.49/km^{2})
- Time zone: UTC-7 (MST)
  - Summer (DST): UTC-6 (MDT)
- Area code: 785
- GNIS feature ID: 471179

Lincoln Township is one of thirteen townships in Sherman County, Kansas, United States. As of the 2020 census, its population was 91.

== Geography ==
Lincoln Township is located in the western part of the county.

It lies west of the county seat of Goodland. There are no cities in the township, although the unincorporated community of Ruleton lies in the center of the township.

Intermittent headwaters of Beaver Creek, a tributary of the Republican River, flow through Lincoln Township.

=== Adjacent townships ===
Grant Township, Sherman County
		north	northeast	Voltaire Township, Sherman County
Stateline Township, Sherman County	west	self	east	Logan Township, Sherman County
		south	southeast	Smoky Township, Sherman County
McPherson Township, Sherman County

== Transportation ==
Interstate 70 and U.S. Route 24 travel east–west through Lincoln Township. A railroad line also travels east–west through Lincoln Township, just north of the interstate.

== Government ==
Lincoln Township is currently inactive; by Kansas law, when a township becomes inactive, its powers and duties revert to the county government.
