= McPherson Township =

McPherson Township may refer to the following townships in the United States:

- McPherson Township, McPherson County, Kansas
- McPherson Township, Sherman County, Kansas
- McPherson Township, Blue Earth County, Minnesota
