= Calhoun Township =

Calhoun Township may refer to the following townships in the United States:

- Calhoun Township, Calhoun County, Iowa
- Calhoun Township, Cheyenne County, Kansas
