= Stateline Township, Kansas =

Township in Sherman County, Kansas, U.S.

Stateline Township
- Township
- Location in Sherman County
- Coordinates: 39°18′00″N 101°58′02″W
- Country: United States
- State: Kansas
- County: Sherman

Area
  - Total: 63.678 sq mi (164.93 km^{2})
  - Land: 63.661 sq mi (164.88 km^{2})
  - Water: 0.017 sq mi (0.044 km^{2}) 0.03%

Population (2020)
  - Total: 240
  - Density: 3.8/sq mi (1.5/km^{2})
- Time zone: UTC-7 (MST)
  - Summer (DST): UTC-6 (MDT)
- Area code: 785
- GNIS feature ID: 471177

Stateline Township is one of thirteen townships in Sherman County, Kansas, United States. As of the 2020 census, its population was 240.

== Geography ==
Stateline Township is located in the western part of the county, along the Colorado border.

It lies west of the county seat of Goodland. The city of Kanorado is located in the western part of the township, on the Colorado state line. As of 2020, 153 of the township's residents lived in Kanorado; the rest of the township had 87 residents.

Several intermittent headwaters of Beaver Creek, a tributary of the Republican River, flow through Stateline Township.

=== Adjacent townships ===
Grant Township, Sherman County
		north
Kit Carson County, Colorado	west	self	east	Lincoln Township, Sherman County
		south
McPherson Township, Sherman County

== Transportation ==
Interstate 70 and U.S. Route 24 travel east–west through Stateline Township, and the short K-267 connects Kanorado with Interstate 70. A small airport, Hall Farms Airport, is located in the southern part of the township. A railroad line also travels east–west through Stateline Township, just north of the interstate.

== Government ==
As an active township, Stateline Township is governed by a three-member board, composed of the township trustee, the township treasurer, and the township clerk. The trustee acts as the township executive.
