= Wano =

Wano may refer to:

- Wano language
- Wano Township, Kansas
- World Association of Nuclear Operators
- We Are Number One, a 2014 song from Icelandic children's series LazyTown.
- Wano Country, a fictional country in the manga series One Piece.
- WQJM (AM), a radio station (1230 AM) licensed to serve Pineville, Kentucky, United States, which held the call sign WANO from 1966 to 2023
