= Ruleton School =

- U.S. National Register of Historic Places
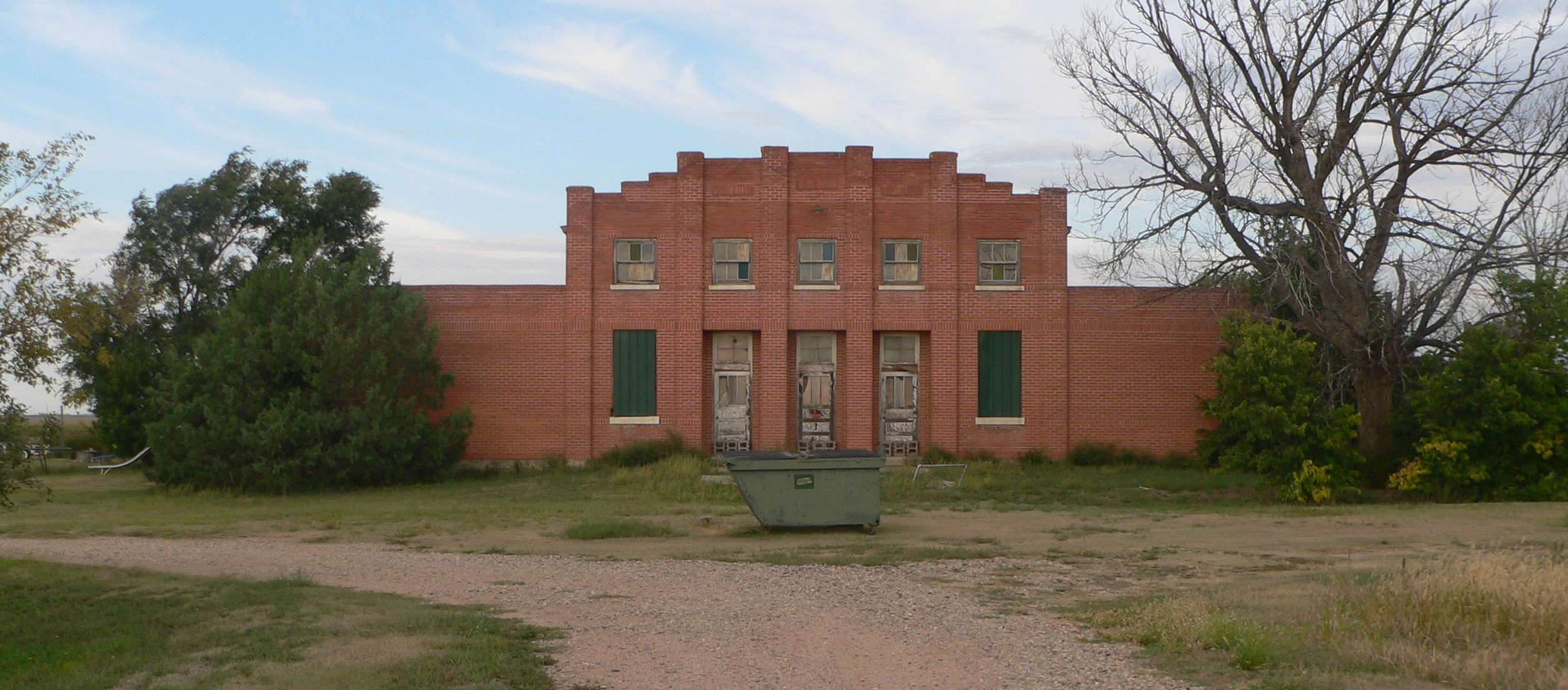

- Location within Kansas Location within the United States
- Location: Ruleton, Kansas
- Coordinates: 39°20′30.25″N 101°53′27.3″W
- Built: 1928
- Built by: Jensen, Tom
- Architectural style: Modern Movement
- NRHP reference No.: 03000840
- Added to NRHP: August 28, 2003

The Ruleton School, in Sherman County, Kansas near Goodland, is a historic school that was built in 1928. It includes Modern Movement architecture and is listed on the National Register of Historic Places.

It was deemed historically significant for its usage as a school and as a community center in its community of Ruleton. It was built after a bond vote to raise $22,500 was passed by vote of 44 to 26, on March 17, 1928.
