= 1972 United States presidential election in Kansas =

- November 7, 1972

Nominee	Richard Nixon	George McGovern
Party	Republican	Democratic
Home state	California	South Dakota
Running mate	Spiro Agnew	Sargent Shriver
Electoral vote	7	0
Popular vote	619,812	270,287
Percentage	67.66%	29.50%
County results
Nixon
50–60%
60–70%
70–80%
President before election
Richard Nixon
Republican
Elected President
Richard Nixon
Republican

The 1972 United States presidential election in Kansas took place on November 7, 1972. All fifty states and the District of Columbia, were part of the 1972 United States presidential election. Voters chose seven electors to the Electoral College, which voted for President and Vice President.

Kansas was won by incumbent Republican President Richard Nixon by a landslide of 38 points; Nixon succeeded in securing re-election against Democratic Senator George McGovern of South Dakota. Nixon ran with Vice President, and former Maryland Governor, Spiro Agnew for vice president, and McGovern ran with United States Ambassador Sargent Shriver for vice president. In the midst of a nationwide Republican landslide, Nixon took 67.66 percent of Kansas’ vote to McGovern's 29.50 percent.

Kansas voters turned out heavily for Nixon, who won every county in the state, making it the last time any presidential candidate has won every single county in the state. McGovern's loss was heavily influenced by his portrayal as a left-wing extremist by the Republican Party throughout the campaign. As of the 2024 presidential election, this is the last election in which the Republican presidential nominee carried Wyandotte County, home to Kansas City.

== Results ==
Electoral results
Presidential candidate	Party	Home state	Popular vote		Electoral vote	Running mate		
Presidential candidate	Party	Home state	Count	Percentage	Electoral vote	Vice-presidential candidate	Home state	Electoral vote
Richard M. Nixon (incumbent)	Republican	California	619,812	67.66%	7	Spiro Agnew (incumbent)	Maryland	7
George McGovern	Democrat	South Dakota	270,287	29.50%	0	Sargent Shriver	Maryland	0
John G. Schmitz	Conservative	California	21,808	2.38%	0	Thomas J. Anderson	Tennessee	0
E. Harold Munn	Prohibition	Michigan	4,188	0.46%	0	Marshall E. Uncapher	Kansas	0
Total			916,095	100%	7			7
Needed to win					270			270

=== Results by county ===
County	Richard Nixon Republican		George McGovern Democratic		John G. Schmitz Conservative		E. Harold Munn Prohibition		Margin		Total votes cast
County	#	%	#	%	#	%	#	%	#	%	Total votes cast
Allen	3,938	69.47%	1,610	28.40%	88	1.55%	33	0.58%	2,328	41.07%	5,669
Anderson	2,718	70.86%	1,035	26.98%	69	1.80%	14	0.36%	1,683	43.88%	3,836
Atchison	5,471	67.83%	2,404	29.80%	159	1.97%	32	0.40%	3,067	38.03%	8,066
Barber	2,308	74.26%	727	23.39%	64	2.07%	9	0.29%	1,581	50.87%	3,108
Barton	8,479	68.87%	3,481	28.27%	313	2.54%	39	0.32%	4,998	40.60%	12,312
Bourbon	4,776	70.09%	1,912	28.06%	79	1.16%	47	0.69%	2,864	42.03%	6,814
Brown	4,314	78.92%	1,038	18.99%	97	1.77%	17	0.31%	3,276	59.93%	5,466
Butler	11,045	67.39%	4,669	28.49%	578	3.53%	97	0.59%	6,376	38.90%	16,389
Chase	1,184	76.04%	315	20.23%	47	3.02%	11	0.71%	869	55.81%	1,557
Chautauqua	1,546	78.00%	378	19.07%	55	2.77%	3	0.15%	1,168	58.93%	1,982
Cherokee	6,019	67.03%	2,806	31.25%	128	1.43%	27	0.30%	3,213	35.78%	8,980
Cheyenne	1,440	75.51%	399	20.92%	62	3.25%	6	0.31%	1,041	54.59%	1,907
Clark	1,142	76.03%	311	20.71%	36	2.40%	13	0.87%	831	55.32%	1,502
Clay	3,562	78.42%	887	19.53%	46	1.01%	47	1.03%	2,675	58.89%	4,542
Cloud	3,832	66.38%	1,806	31.28%	95	1.65%	40	0.69%	2,026	35.10%	5,773
Coffey	2,667	75.70%	782	22.20%	54	1.53%	20	0.57%	1,885	53.50%	3,523
Comanche	1,052	77.18%	281	20.62%	23	1.69%	7	0.51%	771	56.56%	1,363
Cowley	10,332	70.51%	3,592	24.51%	641	4.37%	88	0.60%	6,740	46.00%	14,653
Crawford	9,652	58.02%	6,683	40.17%	230	1.38%	72	0.43%	2,969	17.85%	16,637
Decatur	1,707	70.22%	616	25.34%	92	3.78%	16	0.66%	1,091	44.88%	2,431
Dickinson	6,515	75.34%	1,957	22.63%	132	1.53%	43	0.50%	4,558	52.71%	8,647
Doniphan	2,856	78.40%	690	18.94%	88	2.42%	9	0.25%	2,166	59.46%	3,643
Douglas	15,316	55.64%	11,646	42.31%	484	1.76%	81	0.29%	3,670	13.33%	27,527
Edwards	1,534	64.54%	757	31.85%	75	3.16%	11	0.46%	777	32.69%	2,377
Elk	1,522	76.02%	428	21.38%	47	2.35%	5	0.25%	1,094	54.64%	2,002
Ellis	5,463	55.67%	4,113	41.91%	206	2.10%	31	0.32%	1,350	13.76%	9,813
Ellsworth	2,087	65.20%	1,028	32.11%	68	2.12%	18	0.56%	1,059	33.09%	3,201
Finney	4,335	65.66%	2,062	31.23%	175	2.65%	30	0.45%	2,273	34.43%	6,602
Ford	6,232	67.12%	2,804	30.20%	200	2.15%	49	0.53%	3,428	36.92%	9,285
Franklin	6,011	72.71%	2,056	24.87%	161	1.95%	39	0.47%	3,955	47.84%	8,267
Geary	4,299	70.02%	1,708	27.82%	95	1.55%	38	0.62%	2,591	42.20%	6,140
Gove	1,226	69.86%	466	26.55%	53	3.05%	10	0.58%	760	43.31%	1,755
Graham	1,440	73.32%	488	24.85%	27	1.37%	9	0.46%	952	48.47%	1,964
Grant	1,469	73.19%	476	23.72%	47	2.34%	15	0.75%	993	49.47%	2,007
Gray	1,235	69.15%	511	28.61%	37	2.07%	3	0.17%	724	40.54%	1,786
Greeley	639	68.49%	212	22.72%	76	8.15%	6	0.64%	427	45.77%	933
Greenwood	3,157	74.49%	951	22.44%	99	2.34%	31	0.73%	2,206	52.05%	4,238
Hamilton	941	67.26%	394	28.16%	53	3.79%	11	0.79%	547	39.10%	1,399
Harper	2,628	75.71%	729	21.00%	89	2.56%	25	0.72%	1,899	54.71%	3,471
Harvey	8,287	67.23%	3,555	28.84%	421	3.42%	64	0.52%	4,732	38.39%	12,327
Haskell	1,036	71.55%	383	26.45%	21	1.45%	8	0.55%	653	45.10%	1,448
Hodgeman	853	68.40%	331	26.54%	49	3.93%	14	1.12%	522	41.86%	1,247
Jackson	3,363	71.98%	1,191	25.49%	100	2.14%	18	0.39%	2,172	46.49%	4,672
Jefferson	3,679	72.69%	1,237	24.44%	113	2.23%	32	0.63%	2,442	48.25%	5,061
Jewell	2,242	74.04%	716	23.65%	56	1.85%	14	0.46%	1,526	50.39%	3,028
Johnson	76,161	74.14%	24,324	23.68%	1,923	1.87%	319	0.31%	51,837	50.46%	102,727
Kearny	876	70.87%	325	26.29%	27	2.18%	8	0.65%	551	44.58%	1,236
Kingman	2,756	68.90%	1,107	27.68%	121	3.03%	16	0.40%	1,649	41.22%	4,000
Kiowa	1,559	76.35%	406	19.88%	54	2.64%	23	1.13%	1,153	56.47%	2,042
Labette	6,399	64.76%	3,210	32.49%	234	2.37%	38	0.38%	3,189	32.27%	9,881
Lane	943	73.21%	294	22.83%	41	3.18%	10	0.78%	649	50.38%	1,288
Leavenworth	10,762	67.70%	4,727	29.74%	368	2.31%	40	0.25%	6,035	37.96%	15,897
Lincoln	1,649	75.57%	476	21.81%	54	2.47%	3	0.14%	1,173	53.76%	2,182
Linn	2,593	73.41%	876	24.80%	48	1.36%	15	0.42%	1,717	48.61%	3,532
Logan	1,164	69.99%	428	25.74%	68	4.09%	3	0.18%	736	44.25%	1,663
Lyon	9,157	69.67%	3,720	28.30%	234	1.78%	32	0.24%	5,437	41.37%	13,143
Marion	4,373	72.17%	1,478	24.39%	194	3.20%	14	0.23%	2,895	47.78%	6,059
Marshall	4,127	67.68%	1,823	29.90%	139	2.28%	9	0.15%	2,304	37.78%	6,098
McPherson	7,457	70.56%	2,858	27.04%	189	1.79%	65	0.62%	4,599	43.52%	10,569
Meade	1,712	74.56%	526	22.91%	46	2.00%	12	0.52%	1,186	51.65%	2,296
Miami	5,234	69.04%	2,140	28.23%	190	1.97%	17	0.18%	3,094	40.81%	7,581
Mitchell	2,830	71.59%	1,030	26.06%	82	2.07%	11	0.28%	1,800	45.53%	3,953
Montgomery	11,717	73.66%	3,685	23.17%	459	2.89%	46	0.29%	8,032	50.49%	15,907
Morris	2,471	76.12%	704	21.69%	62	1.91%	9	0.28%	1,767	54.43%	3,246
Morton	1,165	72.68%	363	22.65%	66	4.12%	9	0.56%	802	50.03%	1,603
Nemaha	3,422	64.06%	1,777	33.26%	136	2.55%	7	0.13%	1,645	30.80%	5,342
Neosho	5,034	65.06%	2,559	33.07%	131	1.69%	14	0.18%	2,475	31.99%	7,738
Ness	1,539	68.37%	652	28.96%	49	2.18%	11	0.49%	887	39.41%	2,251
Norton	2,688	75.80%	776	21.88%	75	2.12%	7	0.20%	1,912	53.92%	3,546
Osage	4,073	71.11%	1,522	26.57%	119	2.08%	14	0.24%	2,551	44.54%	5,728
Osborne	2,182	73.42%	724	24.36%	51	1.72%	15	0.50%	1,458	49.06%	2,972
Ottawa	2,065	72.94%	705	24.90%	48	1.70%	13	0.46%	1,360	48.04%	2,831
Pawnee	2,370	65.83%	1,110	30.83%	98	2.72%	22	0.61%	1,260	35.00%	3,600
Phillips	2,919	76.15%	827	21.58%	80	2.09%	7	0.18%	2,092	54.57%	3,833
Pottawatomie	3,947	73.51%	1,298	24.18%	116	2.16%	8	0.15%	2,649	49.33%	5,369
Pratt	3,253	71.20%	1,214	26.57%	80	1.75%	22	0.48%	2,039	44.63%	4,569
Rawlins	1,553	70.46%	560	25.41%	87	3.95%	4	0.18%	993	45.05%	2,204
Reno	15,714	63.81%	8,183	33.23%	500	2.03%	231	0.94%	7,531	30.58%	24,628
Republic	2,921	71.80%	1,059	26.03%	65	1.60%	23	0.57%	1,862	45.77%	4,068
Rice	3,843	66.22%	1,825	31.45%	101	1.74%	34	0.59%	2,018	34.77%	5,803
Riley	11,120	66.16%	5,333	31.73%	310	1.84%	46	0.27%	5,787	34.43%	16,809
Rooks	2,457	71.74%	904	26.39%	55	1.61%	9	0.26%	1,553	45.35%	3,425
Rush	1,639	65.25%	806	32.09%	49	1.95%	18	0.72%	833	33.16%	2,512
Russell	3,168	73.81%	1,011	23.56%	99	2.26%	14	0.32%	2,157	50.25%	4,292
Saline	12,592	68.74%	5,406	29.51%	260	1.42%	61	0.33%	7,186	39.23%	18,319
Scott	1,547	74.30%	449	21.57%	68	3.27%	18	0.86%	1,098	52.73%	2,082
Sedgwick	83,949	65.74%	39,220	30.71%	3,897	3.05%	635	0.50%	44,729	35.03%	127,701
Seward	3,866	77.27%	989	19.77%	126	2.52%	22	0.44%	2,877	57.50%	5,003
Shawnee	43,727	66.75%	20,383	31.12%	1,179	1.80%	217	0.33%	23,344	35.63%	65,506
Sheridan	1,134	64.40%	552	31.35%	69	3.92%	6	0.34%	582	33.05%	1,761
Sherman	2,225	69.92%	785	24.67%	164	5.15%	8	0.25%	1,440	45.25%	3,182
Smith	2,600	74.26%	818	23.36%	63	1.80%	20	0.57%	1,782	50.90%	3,501
Stafford	2,200	70.35%	844	26.99%	59	1.89%	24	0.77%	1,356	43.36%	3,127
Stanton	754	71.54%	259	24.57%	37	3.51%	4	0.38%	495	46.97%	1,054
Stevens	1,392	74.48%	408	21.83%	58	3.10%	11	0.59%	984	52.65%	1,869
Sumner	6,941	68.08%	2,685	26.34%	522	5.12%	47	0.46%	4,256	41.74%	10,195
Thomas	2,300	67.73%	943	27.77%	144	4.24%	9	0.27%	1,357	39.96%	3,396
Trego	1,369	66.91%	621	30.35%	49	2.39%	7	0.34%	748	36.56%	2,046
Wabaunsee	2,461	76.83%	662	20.67%	72	2.25%	8	0.25%	1,799	56.16%	3,203
Wallace	782	73.22%	214	20.04%	69	6.46%	3	0.28%	568	53.18%	1,068
Washington	3,301	75.13%	996	22.67%	79	1.80%	18	0.41%	2,305	52.46%	4,394
Wichita	794	69.89%	288	25.35%	51	4.49%	3	0.26%	506	44.54%	1,136
Wilson	3,568	74.80%	1,043	21.87%	136	2.85%	23	0.48%	2,525	52.93%	4,770
Woodson	1,592	72.59%	550	25.08%	43	1.96%	8	0.36%	1,042	47.51%	2,193
Wyandotte	34,157	52.70%	28,206	43.52%	1,887	2.91%	566	0.87%	5,951	9.18%	64,816
Totals	619,812	67.66%	270,287	29.50%	21,808	2.38%	4,188	0.46%	349,525	38.16%	916,095

== See also ==
- United States presidential elections in Kansas
