= Itasca Township, Kansas =

Township in Sherman County, Kansas, U.S.

Itasca Township
- Township
- Location in Sherman County
- Coordinates: 39°18′15″N 101°40′12″W
- Country: United States
- State: Kansas
- County: Sherman

Area
  - Total: 33.727 sq mi (87.35 km^{2})
  - Land: 33.727 sq mi (87.35 km^{2})
  - Water: 0 sq mi (0 km^{2}) 0%
- Elevation: 3,661 ft (1,116 m)

Population (2020)
  - Total: 275
  - Density: 8.15/sq mi (3.15/km^{2})
- Time zone: UTC-7 (MST)
  - Summer (DST): UTC-6 (MDT)
- ZIP Code: 67735
- Area code: 785
- GNIS feature ID: 0471248

Itasca Township is one of thirteen townships in Sherman County, Kansas, United States. As of the 2020 census, its population was 275.

== Geography ==
Itasca Township is located in the center of the county.

It lies south of the county seat of Goodland. While part of Goodland lies within the township's original boundaries, the city is not part of the township. There are no communities in the township proper.

The intermittent source of the south fork of Sappa Creek is located in Itasca Township.

=== Adjacent townships ===
Voltaire Township, Sherman County
		north
Logan Township, Sherman County	west	self	east	Washington Township, Sherman County
		south	southeast	Iowa Township, Sherman County
Smoky Township, Sherman County

== Transportation ==
Interstate 70 and U.S. Route 24 run east–west through Itasca Township, while its western border with Logan Township is occupied by the north–south K-27. A small airport lies in the northern part of the township. A railroad line also travels east–west through Itasca Township, just north of the interstate.

== Government ==
As an active township, Itasca Township is governed by a three-member board, composed of the township trustee, the township treasurer, and the township clerk. The trustee acts as the township executive.
