= Smoky Township, Kansas =

Township in Sherman County, Kansas, U.S.

Smoky Township
- Township
- Location in Sherman County
- Coordinates: 39°10′36″N 101°44′35″W
- Country: United States
- State: Kansas
- County: Sherman

Area
  - Total: 108.076 sq mi (279.92 km^{2})
  - Land: 107.951 sq mi (279.59 km^{2})
  - Water: 0.125 sq mi (0.32 km^{2}) 0.12%

Population (2020)
  - Total: 55
  - Density: 0.51/sq mi (0.20/km^{2})
- Time zone: UTC-7 (MST)
  - Summer (DST): UTC-6 (MDT)
- Area code: 785
- GNIS feature ID: 471250

Smoky Township is one of thirteen townships in Sherman County, Kansas, United States. As of the 2020 census, its population was 55.

== Geography ==
Smoky Township is located in the southern part of the county.

It lies south of the county seat of Goodland. There are no communities in the township.

The north fork of the Smoky Hill River flows through Smoky Township. The Sherman Wildlife Area, with areas devoted to hunting and camping, is centered on a lake in the western part of the township, where the river is dammed.

=== Adjacent townships ===
Logan Township, Sherman County; Itasca Township, Sherman County
Lincoln Township, Sherman County	northwest	north	northeast	Washington Township, Sherman County
McPherson Township, Sherman County	west	self	east	Iowa Township, Sherman County
		south	southeast	Wallace Township, Wallace County
Sharon Springs Township, Wallace County

== Transportation ==
K-27, a north–south highway, is the only significant road in Smoky Township.

== Government ==
Smoky Township is currently inactive; by Kansas law, when a township becomes inactive, its powers and duties revert to the county government.
