= 1904 United States presidential election in Kansas =

- November 8, 1904
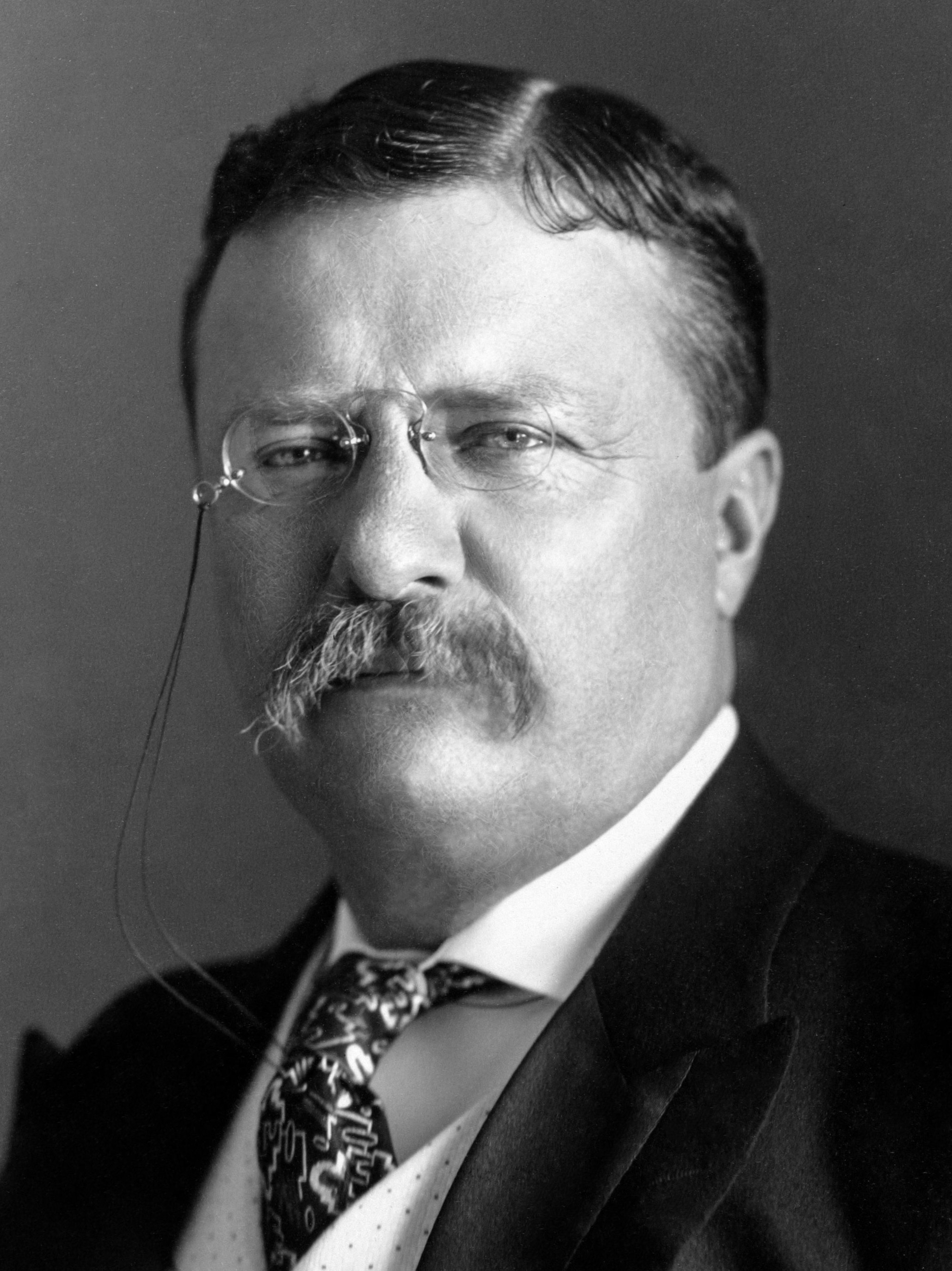

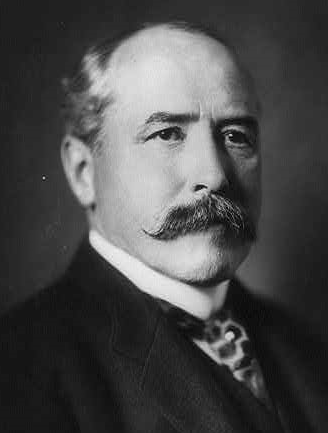
Nominee	Theodore Roosevelt	Alton B. Parker
Party	Republican	Democratic
Home state	New York	New York
Running mate	Charles W. Fairbanks	Henry G. Davis
Electoral vote	10	0
Popular vote	212,955	86,174
Percentage	64.81%	26.23%
County results
Roosevelt
50–60%
60–70%
70–80%
80–90%
President before election
Theodore Roosevelt
Republican
Elected President
Theodore Roosevelt
Republican

The 1904 United States presidential election in Kansas took place on November 8, 1904. All contemporary 45 states were part of the 1904 United States presidential election. Kansas voters chose ten electors to the Electoral College, which selected the president and vice president.

Kansas was won by the Republican nominees, incumbent President Theodore Roosevelt of New York and his running mate Charles W. Fairbanks of Indiana. They defeated the Democratic nominees, former Chief Judge of New York Court of Appeals Alton B. Parker and his running mate, former US Senator Henry G. Davis of West Virginia. Roosevelt won the state by a margin of 38.58 points.

== Results ==
1904 United States presidential election in Kansas
Party	Candidate	Votes	Percentage	Electoral votes
Republican	Theodore Roosevelt (incumbent)	212,955	64.81%	10
Democratic	Alton B. Parker	86,174	26.23%	0
Socialist	Eugene V. Debs	15,869	4.83%	0
Prohibition	Silas C. Swallow	7,306	2.22%	0
Populist	Thomas E. Watson	6,257	1.90%	0
Totals		328,561	100.00%	10
Voter turnout				—

=== Results by county ===
1904 United States presidential election in Kansas by county
County	Theodore Roosevelt Republican		Alton Brooks Parker Democratic		Eugene Victor Debs Socialist		Silas Comfort Swallow Prohibition		Thomas Edward Watson Populist		Margin		Total votes cast
County	#	%	#	%	#	%	#	%	#	%	#	%	Total votes cast
Allen	3,754	68.06%	1,380	25.02%	169	3.06%	157	2.85%	56	1.02%	2,374	43.04%	5,516
Anderson	1,891	58.26%	1,043	32.13%	87	2.68%	132	4.07%	93	2.87%	848	26.12%	3,246
Atchison	3,542	64.34%	1,854	33.68%	53	0.96%	36	0.65%	20	0.36%	1,688	30.66%	5,505
Barber	967	58.29%	566	34.12%	55	3.32%	50	3.01%	21	1.27%	401	24.17%	1,659
Barton	1,939	58.19%	1,235	37.06%	91	2.73%	37	1.11%	30	0.90%	704	21.13%	3,332
Bourbon	3,234	59.27%	1,808	33.14%	305	5.59%	69	1.26%	40	0.73%	1,426	26.14%	5,456
Brown	3,158	68.61%	1,244	27.03%	88	1.91%	83	1.80%	30	0.65%	1,914	41.58%	4,603
Butler	3,306	61.90%	1,540	28.83%	220	4.12%	207	3.88%	68	1.27%	1,766	33.06%	5,341
Chase	1,217	64.43%	562	29.75%	20	1.06%	66	3.49%	24	1.27%	655	34.67%	1,889
Chautauqua	2,033	67.45%	681	22.59%	212	7.03%	37	1.23%	51	1.69%	1,352	44.86%	3,014
Cherokee	4,586	55.81%	2,253	27.42%	1,192	14.51%	81	0.99%	105	1.28%	2,333	28.39%	8,217
Cheyenne	446	72.88%	96	15.69%	36	5.88%	13	2.12%	21	3.43%	350	57.19%	612
Clark	246	60.74%	131	32.35%	10	2.47%	5	1.23%	13	3.21%	115	28.40%	405
Clay	2,262	68.48%	403	12.20%	138	4.18%	87	2.63%	413	12.50%	1,849 (Note: In this county where Parker ran third behind Watson, margin given is Roosevelt vote minus Watson vote and percentage margin Roosevelt percentage minus Watson percentage.)	55.98%	3,303
Cloud	2,470	67.54%	626	17.12%	288	7.88%	92	2.52%	181	4.95%	1,844	50.42%	3,657
Coffey	2,164	59.39%	1,280	35.13%	31	0.85%	112	3.07%	57	1.56%	884	24.26%	3,644
Comanche	272	63.40%	129	30.07%	4	0.93%	22	5.13%	2	0.47%	143	33.33%	429
Cowley	3,961	61.32%	1,456	22.54%	714	11.05%	249	3.85%	80	1.24%	2,505	38.78%	6,460
Crawford	5,910	58.36%	2,057	20.31%	1,973	19.48%	111	1.10%	76	0.75%	3,853	38.05%	10,127
Decatur	1,215	59.71%	411	20.20%	115	5.65%	32	1.57%	262	12.87%	804	39.51%	2,035
Dickinson	3,185	66.88%	1,219	25.60%	235	4.93%	87	1.83%	36	0.76%	1,966	41.29%	4,762
Doniphan	2,361	75.00%	713	22.65%	50	1.59%	17	0.54%	7	0.22%	1,648	52.35%	3,148
Douglas	3,574	74.27%	989	20.55%	58	1.21%	147	3.05%	44	0.91%	2,585	53.72%	4,812
Edwards	816	64.25%	328	25.83%	19	1.50%	55	4.33%	52	4.09%	488	38.43%	1,270
Elk	1,713	67.47%	706	27.81%	36	1.42%	49	1.93%	35	1.38%	1,007	39.66%	2,539
Ellis	1,009	51.06%	928	46.96%	15	0.76%	20	1.01%	4	0.20%	81	4.10%	1,976
Ellsworth	1,359	68.43%	578	29.10%	11	0.55%	27	1.36%	11	0.55%	781	39.33%	1,986
Finney	598	66.82%	215	24.02%	57	6.37%	15	1.68%	10	1.12%	383	42.79%	895
Ford	1,148	64.79%	526	29.68%	47	2.65%	39	2.20%	12	0.68%	622	35.10%	1,772
Franklin	2,855	62.84%	1,310	28.84%	98	2.16%	209	4.60%	71	1.56%	1,545	34.01%	4,543
Geary	1,431	67.92%	591	28.05%	30	1.42%	44	2.09%	11	0.52%	840	39.87%	2,107
Gove	470	63.17%	204	27.42%	27	3.63%	30	4.03%	13	1.75%	266	35.75%	744
Graham	921	64.72%	244	17.15%	116	8.15%	33	2.32%	109	7.66%	677	47.58%	1,423
Grant	81	66.39%	35	28.69%	1	0.82%	0	0.00%	5	4.10%	46	37.70%	122
Gray	285	64.48%	113	25.57%	38	8.60%	4	0.90%	2	0.45%	172	38.91%	442
Greeley	149	85.63%	14	8.05%	7	4.02%	3	1.72%	1	0.57%	135	77.59%	174
Greenwood	2,458	63.70%	1,211	31.38%	87	2.25%	48	1.24%	55	1.43%	1,247	32.31%	3,859
Hamilton	215	58.58%	126	34.33%	4	1.09%	15	4.09%	7	1.91%	89	24.25%	367
Harper	1,459	61.80%	597	25.29%	152	6.44%	70	2.96%	83	3.52%	862	36.51%	2,361
Harvey	2,362	70.66%	690	20.64%	148	4.43%	105	3.14%	38	1.14%	1,672	50.01%	3,343
Haskell	120	69.36%	46	26.59%	3	1.73%	3	1.73%	1	0.58%	74	42.77%	173
Hodgeman	449	67.52%	192	28.87%	15	2.26%	5	0.75%	4	0.60%	257	38.65%	665
Jackson	2,547	70.03%	919	25.27%	48	1.32%	85	2.34%	38	1.04%	1,628	44.76%	3,637
Jefferson	2,568	65.26%	1,199	30.47%	76	1.93%	63	1.60%	29	0.74%	1,369	34.79%	3,935
Jewell	2,720	68.05%	927	23.19%	96	2.40%	148	3.70%	106	2.65%	1,793	44.86%	3,997
Johnson	2,573	61.07%	1,373	32.59%	112	2.66%	40	0.95%	115	2.73%	1,200	28.48%	4,213
Kearny	234	70.69%	94	28.40%	1	0.30%	2	0.60%	0	0.00%	140	42.30%	331
Kingman	1,600	63.17%	661	26.10%	170	6.71%	50	1.97%	52	2.05%	939	37.07%	2,533
Kiowa	494	59.23%	251	30.10%	34	4.08%	45	5.40%	10	1.20%	243	29.14%	834
Labette	3,700	58.67%	1,637	25.96%	657	10.42%	180	2.85%	132	2.09%	2,063	32.71%	6,306
Lane	353	63.49%	111	19.96%	59	10.61%	21	3.78%	12	2.16%	242	43.53%	556
Leavenworth	5,771	64.15%	2,775	30.85%	371	4.12%	66	0.73%	13	0.14%	2,996	33.30%	8,996
Lincoln	1,516	67.86%	613	27.44%	57	2.55%	29	1.30%	19	0.85%	903	40.42%	2,234
Linn	2,324	62.51%	1,085	29.18%	100	2.69%	60	1.61%	149	4.01%	1,239	33.32%	3,718
Logan	408	71.83%	117	20.60%	30	5.28%	8	1.41%	5	0.88%	291	51.23%	568
Lyon	3,450	62.12%	1,461	26.31%	369	6.64%	182	3.28%	92	1.66%	1,989	35.81%	5,554
Marion	2,705	71.20%	928	24.43%	80	2.11%	61	1.61%	25	0.66%	1,777	46.78%	3,799
Marshall	3,530	66.14%	1,564	29.30%	88	1.65%	112	2.10%	43	0.81%	1,966	36.84%	5,337
McPherson	2,991	72.74%	773	18.80%	161	3.92%	101	2.46%	86	2.09%	2,218	53.94%	4,112
Meade	383	66.38%	166	28.77%	11	1.91%	8	1.39%	9	1.56%	217	37.61%	577
Miami	2,899	63.45%	1,425	31.19%	119	2.60%	43	0.94%	83	1.82%	1,474	32.26%	4,569
Mitchell	2,037	63.88%	867	27.19%	168	5.27%	48	1.51%	69	2.16%	1,170	36.69%	3,189
Montgomery	4,997	64.93%	2,091	27.17%	452	5.87%	107	1.39%	49	0.64%	2,906	37.76%	7,696
Morris	2,007	70.32%	702	24.60%	29	1.02%	60	2.10%	56	1.96%	1,305	45.73%	2,854
Morton	53	54.08%	44	44.90%	0	0.00%	1	1.02%	0	0.00%	9	9.18%	98
Nemaha	2,764	61.95%	1,564	35.05%	47	1.05%	58	1.30%	29	0.65%	1,200	26.89%	4,462
Neosho	3,134	62.12%	1,530	30.33%	245	4.86%	51	1.01%	85	1.68%	1,604	31.79%	5,045
Ness	687	58.97%	188	16.14%	96	8.24%	100	8.58%	94	8.07%	499	42.83%	1,165
Norton	1,570	67.24%	417	17.86%	159	6.81%	76	3.25%	113	4.84%	1,153	49.38%	2,335
Osage	3,670	65.01%	1,516	26.86%	223	3.95%	122	2.16%	114	2.02%	2,154	38.16%	5,645
Osborne	1,765	71.08%	420	16.92%	66	2.66%	149	6.00%	83	3.34%	1,345	54.17%	2,483
Ottawa	1,682	66.32%	477	18.81%	115	4.53%	65	2.56%	197	7.77%	1,205	47.52%	2,536
Pawnee	957	60.80%	494	31.39%	49	3.11%	29	1.84%	45	2.86%	463	29.42%	1,574
Phillips	2,147	66.37%	811	25.07%	85	2.63%	76	2.35%	116	3.59%	1,336	41.30%	3,235
Pottawatomie	2,632	69.83%	1,045	27.73%	9	0.24%	48	1.27%	35	0.93%	1,587	42.11%	3,769
Pratt	1,076	63.41%	421	24.81%	69	4.07%	63	3.71%	68	4.01%	655	38.60%	1,697
Rawlins	749	61.14%	405	33.06%	44	3.59%	5	0.41%	22	1.80%	344	28.08%	1,225
Reno	4,245	69.33%	1,423	23.24%	275	4.49%	127	2.07%	53	0.87%	2,822	46.09%	6,123
Republic	2,658	69.51%	941	24.61%	56	1.46%	83	2.17%	86	2.25%	1,717	44.90%	3,824
Rice	1,994	64.16%	727	23.39%	115	3.70%	234	7.53%	38	1.22%	1,267	40.77%	3,108
Riley	2,251	75.26%	523	17.49%	54	1.81%	74	2.47%	89	2.98%	1,728	57.77%	2,991
Rooks	1,266	64.46%	495	25.20%	65	3.31%	108	5.50%	30	1.53%	771	39.26%	1,964
Rush	883	58.21%	570	37.57%	31	2.04%	15	0.99%	18	1.19%	313	20.63%	1,517
Russell	1,451	71.41%	515	25.34%	32	1.57%	19	0.94%	15	0.74%	936	46.06%	2,032
Saline	2,797	70.35%	798	20.07%	139	3.50%	43	1.08%	199	5.01%	1,999	50.28%	3,976
Scott	275	62.64%	79	18.00%	42	9.57%	11	2.51%	32	7.29%	196	44.65%	439
Sedgwick	6,697	60.77%	2,869	26.03%	826	7.50%	385	3.49%	243	2.21%	3,828	34.74%	11,020
Seward	152	65.52%	62	26.72%	4	1.72%	10	4.31%	4	1.72%	90	38.79%	232
Shawnee	8,409	73.18%	2,441	21.24%	425	3.70%	150	1.31%	66	0.57%	5,968	51.94%	11,491
Sheridan	607	57.86%	293	27.93%	61	5.82%	42	4.00%	46	4.39%	314	29.93%	1,049
Sherman	465	60.55%	231	30.08%	34	4.43%	21	2.73%	17	2.21%	234	30.47%	768
Smith	2,254	65.93%	596	17.43%	74	2.16%	65	1.90%	430	12.58%	1,658	48.49%	3,419
Stafford	1,419	63.12%	585	26.02%	55	2.45%	117	5.20%	72	3.20%	834	37.10%	2,248
Stanton	63	64.95%	34	35.05%	0	0.00%	0	0.00%	0	0.00%	29	29.90%	97
Stevens	122	64.21%	40	21.05%	3	1.58%	25	13.16%	0	0.00%	82	43.16%	190
Sumner	3,264	61.62%	1,489	28.11%	335	6.32%	157	2.96%	52	0.98%	1,775	33.51%	5,297
Thomas	548	57.08%	205	21.35%	101	10.52%	20	2.08%	86	8.96%	343	35.73%	960
Trego	526	60.81%	264	30.52%	23	2.66%	43	4.97%	9	1.04%	262	30.29%	865
Wabaunsee	2,016	71.44%	688	24.38%	20	0.71%	67	2.37%	31	1.10%	1,328	47.06%	2,822
Wallace	278	83.99%	39	11.78%	4	1.21%	7	2.11%	3	0.91%	239	72.21%	331
Washington	3,066	68.13%	1,259	27.98%	68	1.51%	47	1.04%	60	1.33%	1,807	40.16%	4,500
Wichita	245	67.31%	91	25.00%	13	3.57%	6	1.65%	9	2.47%	154	42.31%	364
Wilson	2,583	63.37%	1,034	25.37%	333	8.17%	92	2.26%	34	0.83%	1,549	38.00%	4,076
Woodson	1,490	63.54%	657	28.02%	28	1.19%	132	5.63%	38	1.62%	833	35.52%	2,345
Wyandotte	9,147	64.18%	3,815	26.77%	1,103	7.74%	141	0.99%	46	0.32%	5,332	37.41%	14,252
Totals	213,455	64.87%	86,164	26.19%	15,869	4.82%	7,306	2.22%	6,253	1.90%	127,291	38.68%	329,047

== See also ==
- United States presidential elections in Kansas
