= 1988 United States presidential election in Kansas =

- November 8, 1988

Nominee	George H. W. Bush	Michael Dukakis
Party	Republican	Democratic
Home state	Texas	Massachusetts
Running mate	Dan Quayle	Lloyd Bentsen
Electoral vote	7	0
Popular vote	554,049	422,636
Percentage	55.79%	42.56%

Bush
40–50%
50–60%
60–70%
70–80%
80–90%
90–100%
Dukakis
40–50%
50–60%
60–70%
70–80%
80–90%
90–100%
President before election
Ronald Reagan
Republican
Elected President
George H. W. Bush
Republican

The 1988 United States presidential election in Kansas took place on November 8, 1988. All fifty states and the District of Columbia, were part of the 1988 United States presidential election. Voters chose seven electors to the Electoral College, which selected the president and vice president.

Kansas was won by incumbent United States Vice President George H. W. Bush of Texas, who was running against Massachusetts Governor Michael Dukakis. Bush ran with Indiana Senator Dan Quayle as Vice President, and Dukakis ran with Texas Senator Lloyd Bentsen.

Kansas weighed in for this election as 2 points more Republican than the national average. The presidential election of 1988 was a very partisan election for Kansas, with over 98 percent of the electorate voting for either the Democratic or Republican parties, and only four political parties appearing on the ballot. Voters from every county in Kansas turned out for the Republican Party, except for three, the largest example being Kansas City's Wyandotte County, which voted primarily Democratic. As of the 2024 presidential election, this is the last time Douglas County voted for a Republican presidential candidate.

Bush won the election in Kansas with a 13-point win, although compared to most previous Republican performances in Kansas this was an underwhelming triumph due to the influence of an ongoing drought and farm crisis. Dukakis’s performance is the best of any Democratic presidential candidate in the state since 1976, and was the last time until 2008 that a Democrat received more than 40% of the vote in Kansas.

== Results ==
1988 United States presidential election in Kansas
Party	Candidate	Votes	Percentage	Electoral votes
Republican	George H. W. Bush	554,049	55.79%	7
Democratic	Michael Dukakis	422,636	42.56%	0
Independent	Ron Paul	12,553	1.26%	0
Independent	Lenora Fulani	3,806	0.38%	0
Totals		993,044	100.0%	7

=== Results by county ===
County	George H.W. Bush Republican		Michael Dukakis Democratic		Ron Paul Independent		Leonora Fulani Independent		Margin		Total votes cast
County	#	%	#	%	#	%	#	%	#	%	Total votes cast
Allen	3,429	58.14%	2,392	40.56%	49	0.83%	28	0.47%	1,037	17.58%	5,898
Anderson	1,781	54.25%	1,466	44.65%	21	0.64%	15	0.46%	315	9.60%	3,283
Atchison	3,243	49.03%	3,177	48.03%	167	2.52%	27	0.41%	66	1.00%	6,614
Barber	1,539	56.87%	1,118	41.32%	39	1.44%	10	0.37%	421	15.55%	2,706
Barton	7,741	59.20%	5,024	38.42%	251	1.92%	59	0.45%	2,717	20.78%	13,075
Bourbon	3,660	57.80%	2,623	41.42%	31	0.49%	18	0.28%	1,037	16.38%	6,332
Brown	3,059	63.57%	1,719	35.72%	20	0.42%	14	0.29%	1,340	27.85%	4,812
Butler	10,976	57.60%	7,690	40.35%	374	1.96%	16	0.08%	3,286	17.25%	19,056
Chase	884	60.63%	538	36.90%	32	2.19%	4	0.27%	346	23.73%	1,458
Chautauqua	1,247	64.48%	661	34.18%	19	0.98%	7	0.36%	586	30.30%	1,934
Cherokee	4,281	50.95%	4,069	48.43%	37	0.44%	15	0.18%	212	2.52%	8,402
Cheyenne	1,105	63.40%	594	34.08%	30	1.72%	14	0.80%	511	29.32%	1,743
Clark	876	66.62%	409	31.10%	23	1.75%	7	0.53%	467	35.52%	1,315
Clay	2,997	72.10%	1,112	26.75%	33	0.79%	15	0.36%	1,885	45.35%	4,157
Cloud	3,043	59.34%	2,022	39.43%	35	0.68%	28	0.55%	1,021	19.91%	5,128
Coffey	2,581	66.69%	1,246	32.20%	33	0.85%	10	0.26%	1,335	34.49%	3,870
Comanche	738	65.72%	375	33.39%	6	0.53%	4	0.36%	363	32.33%	1,123
Cowley	7,778	54.44%	6,186	43.30%	283	1.98%	39	0.27%	1,592	11.14%	14,286
Crawford	6,940	46.73%	7,783	52.41%	85	0.57%	42	0.28%	-843	-5.68%	14,850
Decatur	1,291	60.10%	793	36.92%	46	2.14%	18	0.84%	498	23.18%	2,148
Dickinson	5,121	63.28%	2,870	35.47%	85	1.05%	16	0.20%	2,251	27.81%	8,092
Doniphan	2,162	61.53%	1,312	37.34%	32	0.91%	8	0.23%	850	24.19%	3,514
Douglas	16,149	49.90%	15,752	48.68%	314	0.97%	146	0.45%	397	1.22%	32,361
Edwards	993	53.88%	792	42.97%	41	2.22%	17	0.92%	201	10.91%	1,843
Elk	1,075	63.01%	608	35.64%	17	1.00%	6	0.35%	467	27.37%	1,706
Ellis	5,194	48.67%	5,289	49.56%	163	1.53%	26	0.24%	-95	-0.89%	10,672
Ellsworth	1,711	57.03%	1,219	40.63%	47	1.57%	23	0.77%	492	16.40%	3,000
Finney	5,381	60.14%	3,408	38.09%	127	1.42%	31	0.35%	1,973	22.05%	8,947
Ford	5,685	58.63%	3,817	39.36%	152	1.57%	43	0.44%	1,868	19.27%	9,697
Franklin	4,777	56.43%	3,592	42.43%	75	0.89%	21	0.25%	1,185	14.00%	8,465
Geary	3,782	57.54%	2,721	41.40%	40	0.61%	30	0.46%	1,061	16.14%	6,573
Gove	966	57.36%	663	39.37%	48	2.85%	7	0.42%	303	17.99%	1,684
Graham	1,139	60.97%	702	37.58%	21	1.12%	6	0.32%	437	23.39%	1,868
Grant	1,654	63.69%	907	34.92%	27	1.04%	9	0.35%	747	28.77%	2,597
Gray	1,180	61.55%	696	36.31%	33	1.72%	8	0.42%	484	25.24%	1,917
Greeley	506	59.32%	317	37.16%	27	3.17%	3	0.35%	189	22.16%	853
Greenwood	2,217	59.66%	1,421	38.24%	64	1.72%	14	0.38%	796	21.42%	3,716
Hamilton	801	60.00%	517	38.73%	14	1.05%	3	0.22%	284	21.27%	1,335
Harper	1,941	59.39%	1,235	37.79%	72	2.20%	20	0.61%	706	21.60%	3,268
Harvey	6,893	54.23%	5,503	43.29%	262	2.06%	53	0.42%	1,390	10.94%	12,711
Haskell	964	67.41%	427	29.86%	35	2.45%	4	0.28%	537	37.55%	1,430
Hodgeman	732	60.40%	439	36.22%	32	2.64%	9	0.74%	293	24.18%	1,212
Jackson	2,759	54.36%	2,261	44.55%	40	0.79%	15	0.30%	498	9.81%	5,075
Jefferson	3,605	55.53%	2,810	43.28%	46	0.71%	31	0.48%	795	12.25%	6,492
Jewell	1,546	67.99%	684	30.08%	30	1.32%	14	0.62%	862	37.91%	2,274
Johnson	95,591	62.81%	55,183	36.26%	1,001	0.66%	424	0.28%	40,408	26.55%	152,199
Kearny	1,073	66.03%	524	32.25%	23	1.42%	5	0.31%	549	33.78%	1,625
Kingman	2,205	58.74%	1,420	37.83%	103	2.74%	26	0.69%	785	20.91%	3,754
Kiowa	1,276	71.09%	485	27.02%	29	1.62%	5	0.28%	791	44.07%	1,795
Labette	5,125	52.92%	4,433	45.78%	88	0.91%	38	0.39%	692	7.14%	9,684
Lane	768	61.44%	450	36.00%	24	1.92%	8	0.64%	318	25.44%	1,250
Leavenworth	9,913	52.53%	8,797	46.62%	109	0.58%	51	0.27%	1,116	5.91%	18,870
Lincoln	1,229	59.66%	796	38.64%	32	1.55%	3	0.15%	433	21.02%	2,060
Linn	2,163	58.60%	1,497	40.56%	24	0.65%	7	0.19%	666	18.04%	3,691
Logan	988	64.36%	503	32.77%	35	2.28%	9	0.59%	485	31.59%	1,535
Lyon	6,820	55.29%	5,314	43.08%	148	1.20%	52	0.42%	1,506	12.21%	12,334
McPherson	6,563	58.79%	4,354	39.00%	112	1.91%	29	0.50%	2,209	19.79%	11,164
Marion	3,685	62.99%	2,024	34.60%	64	1.11%	26	0.45%	1,661	28.39%	5,850
Marshall	3,140	54.23%	2,560	44.21%	207	1.85%	40	0.36%	580	10.02%	5,790
Meade	1,322	65.19%	664	32.74%	34	1.68%	8	0.39%	658	32.45%	2,028
Miami	4,807	51.65%	4,427	47.57%	55	0.59%	17	0.18%	380	4.08%	9,306
Mitchell	2,257	65.19%	1,145	33.07%	36	1.04%	24	0.69%	1,112	32.12%	3,462
Montgomery	9,067	61.98%	5,429	37.11%	90	0.62%	42	0.29%	3,638	24.87%	14,628
Morris	1,682	58.12%	1,165	40.26%	34	1.17%	13	0.45%	517	17.86%	2,894
Morton	1,074	64.35%	569	34.09%	23	1.38%	3	0.18%	505	30.26%	1,669
Nemaha	2,849	54.98%	2,261	43.63%	57	1.10%	15	0.29%	588	11.35%	5,182
Neosho	3,739	51.77%	3,402	47.11%	64	0.89%	17	0.24%	337	4.66%	7,222
Ness	1,230	56.58%	887	40.80%	52	2.39%	5	0.23%	343	15.78%	2,174
Norton	1,923	67.54%	855	30.03%	60	2.11%	9	0.32%	1,068	37.51%	2,847
Osage	3,496	54.33%	2,840	44.13%	73	1.13%	26	0.40%	656	10.20%	6,435
Osborne	1,541	60.57%	943	37.07%	47	1.85%	13	0.51%	598	23.50%	2,544
Ottawa	1,836	64.78%	953	33.63%	35	1.24%	10	0.35%	883	31.15%	2,834
Pawnee	1,825	54.11%	1,474	43.70%	67	1.99%	7	0.21%	351	10.41%	3,373
Phillips	2,316	69.86%	960	28.96%	34	1.03%	5	0.15%	1,356	40.90%	3,315
Pottawatomie	3,897	59.51%	2,544	38.85%	93	1.42%	15	0.23%	1,353	20.66%	6,549
Pratt	2,505	59.01%	1,651	38.89%	70	1.65%	19	0.45%	854	20.12%	4,245
Rawlins	1,318	66.46%	612	30.86%	42	2.12%	11	0.55%	706	35.60%	1,983
Reno	12,753	51.11%	11,545	46.27%	560	2.24%	96	0.38%	1,208	4.84%	24,954
Republic	2,346	67.76%	1,069	30.88%	28	0.81%	19	0.55%	1,277	36.88%	3,462
Rice	2,503	53.89%	2,033	43.77%	94	2.02%	15	0.32%	470	10.12%	4,645
Riley	9,507	55.90%	7,283	42.82%	159	0.93%	58	0.34%	2,224	13.08%	17,007
Rooks	1,938	64.45%	1,012	33.65%	48	1.60%	9	0.30%	926	30.80%	3,007
Rush	1,045	48.54%	1,020	47.38%	85	3.95%	3	0.14%	25	1.16%	2,153
Russell	2,403	61.21%	1,448	36.88%	45	1.15%	30	0.76%	955	24.33%	3,926
Saline	11,371	57.96%	7,998	40.77%	180	0.92%	69	0.35%	3,373	17.19%	19,618
Scott	1,590	66.95%	717	30.19%	58	2.44%	10	0.42%	873	36.76%	2,375
Sedgwick	86,124	55.30%	65,618	42.13%	3,104	1.99%	899	0.58%	20,506	13.17%	155,745
Seward	4,089	70.54%	1,655	28.55%	43	0.74%	10	0.17%	2,434	41.99%	5,797
Shawnee	35,489	50.56%	33,940	48.35%	527	0.75%	241	0.34%	1,549	2.21%	70,197
Sheridan	901	57.90%	600	38.56%	45	2.89%	10	0.64%	301	19.34%	1,556
Sherman	1,929	62.94%	1,082	35.30%	43	1.40%	11	0.36%	847	27.64%	3,065
Smith	1,951	65.29%	1,004	33.60%	28	0.94%	5	0.17%	947	31.69%	2,988
Stafford	1,532	55.95%	1,121	40.94%	75	2.74%	10	0.37%	411	15.01%	2,738
Stanton	592	62.32%	310	32.63%	46	4.84%	2	0.21%	282	29.69%	950
Stevens	1,642	71.17%	612	26.53%	46	1.99%	7	0.30%	1,030	44.64%	2,307
Sumner	5,394	53.71%	4,417	43.99%	198	1.97%	33	0.33%	977	9.72%	10,042
Thomas	2,342	60.52%	1,408	36.38%	93	2.40%	27	0.70%	934	24.14%	3,870
Trego	979	53.47%	795	43.42%	51	2.79%	6	0.33%	184	10.05%	1,831
Wabaunsee	1,737	58.54%	1,166	39.30%	54	1.82%	10	0.34%	571	19.24%	2,967
Wallace	655	69.61%	257	27.31%	24	2.55%	5	0.53%	398	42.30%	941
Washington	2,269	67.13%	1,063	31.45%	31	0.92%	17	0.50%	1,206	35.68%	3,380
Wichita	721	62.80%	399	34.76%	21	1.83%	7	0.61%	322	28.04%	1,148
Wilson	2,743	63.12%	1,545	35.55%	49	1.13%	9	0.21%	1,198	27.57%	4,346
Woodson	1,062	57.50%	761	41.20%	18	0.97%	6	0.32%	301	16.30%	1,847
Wyandotte	19,097	32.70%	38,678	66.23%	377	0.65%	247	0.42%	-19,581	-33.53%	58,399
Totals	554,049	55.79%	422,636	42.56%	12,553	1.26%	3,806	0.38%	131,413	13.23%	993,044

==== Counties that flipped from Republican to Democratic ====
- Crawford (largest city: Pittsburg)
- Ellis (largest city: Hays)

== See also ==
- United States presidential elections in Kansas
- Presidency of George H. W. Bush
