= Orlando Township, Kansas =

Orlando Township
- Township
- Location in Cheyenne County
- Coordinates: 39°47′40″N 101°41′12″W
- Country: United States
- State: Kansas
- County: Cheyenne

Area
  - Total: 35.90 sq mi (92.99 km^{2})
  - Land: 35.90 sq mi (92.99 km^{2})
  - Water: 0 sq mi (0 km^{2}) 0%
- Elevation: 3,425 ft (1,044 m)

Population (2020)
  - Total: 44
  - Density: 1.2/sq mi (0.47/km^{2})
- GNIS feature ID: 0470975

Orlando Township is a township in Cheyenne County, Kansas, United States. As of the 2020 census, its population was 44.

== History ==
Orlando was issued a post office in 1886. The post office was discontinued in 1888.

== Geography ==
Orlando Township covers an area of 35.9 square miles (93 km^{2}) and contains no incorporated settlements. According to the USGS, it contains one cemetery, Wheeler.
