= Kanorado, Kansas =

City in Sherman County, Kansas

- City
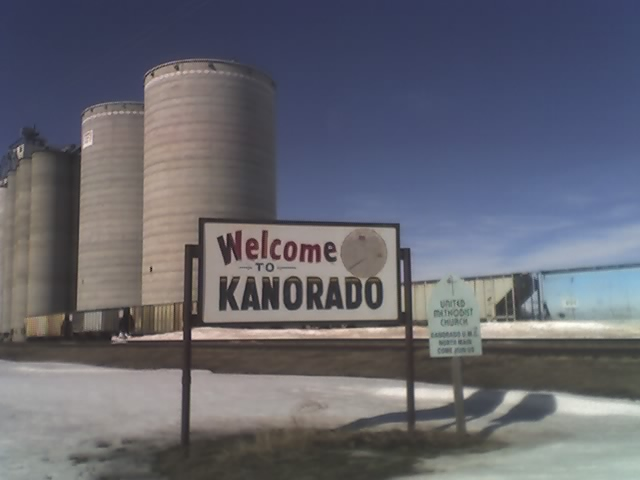
- Kanorado Welcome Sign (2008)

- Location within Sherman County and Kansas

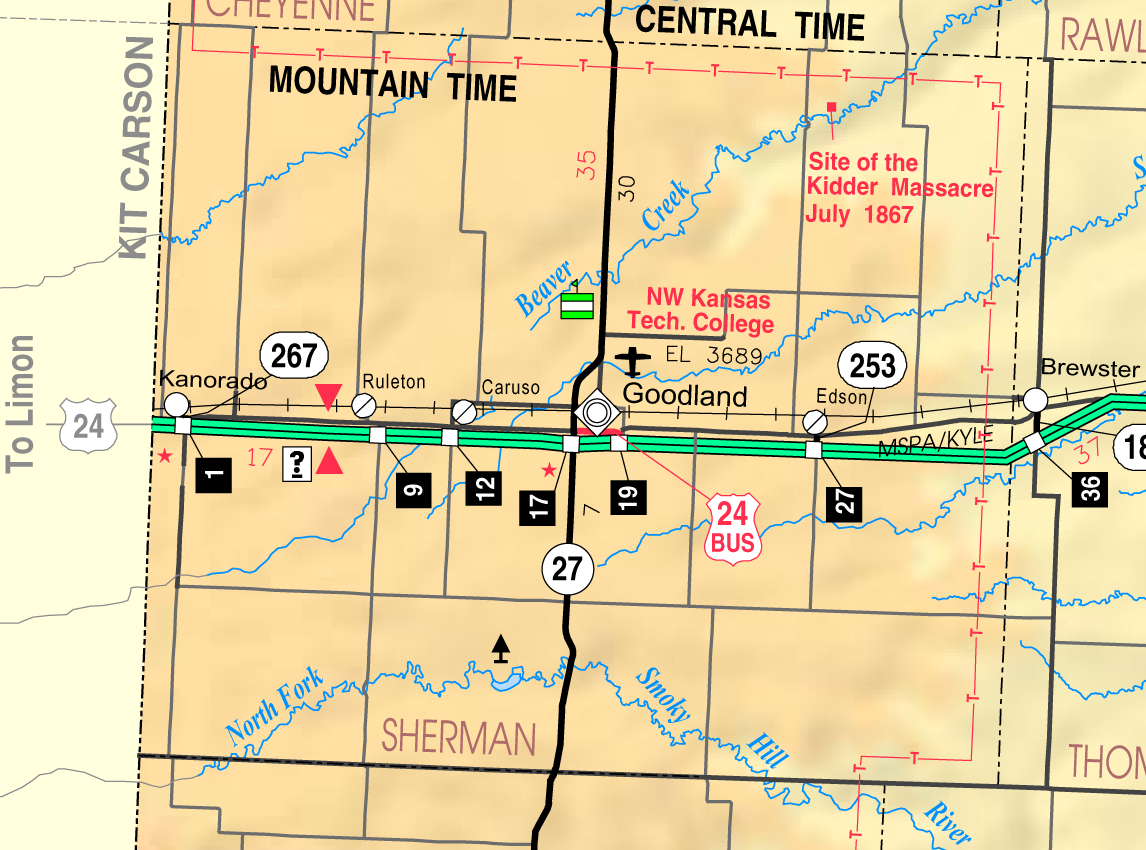
- KDOT map of Sherman County (legend)
- Coordinates: 39°19′59″N 102°2′17″W
- Country: United States
- State: Kansas
- County: Sherman
- Township: Stateline
- Founded: 1880s
- Incorporated: 1920
- Named for: two states

Area
  - Total: 0.26 sq mi (0.68 km^{2})
  - Land: 0.26 sq mi (0.68 km^{2})
  - Water: 0 sq mi (0.00 km^{2})
- Elevation: 3,908 ft (1,191 m)

Population (2020)
  - Total: 153
  - Density: 580/sq mi (230/km^{2})
- Time zone: UTC-7 (Mountain (MST))
  - Summer (DST): UTC-6 (MDT)
- ZIP Code: 67741
- Area code: 785
- FIPS code: 20-35975
- GNIS ID: 471238
- Website: cityofkanorado.com

Kanorado is a city in Sherman County, Kansas, United States. The name is a portmanteau of Kansas and Colorado, because it is near the state line. As of the 2020 census, the population of the city was 153. Kanorado has the highest elevation of all cities in Kansas.

== History ==
The first post office in the community was established in 1889, but the post office was called Lamborn until 1903.

On February 10, 2016 the House of Representatives of the State of Kansas passed a Resolution (Res.#6033) designating the City of Kanorado as the Top City of Kansas. This is due to it being the highest city elevation in the State of Kansas at 3,907 feet (1,191 m).

== Geography ==
Kanorado is located at 39°19′59″N 102°2′17″W (39.3330542, -102.0379596). It is Exit 1 off Interstate 70 in Kansas. According to the United States Census Bureau, the city has a total area of 0.26 square miles (0.67 km^{2}), all land. Kanorado is located in Sherman County.

In 1873 Cutler's History of the State of Kansas book, it characterized the county as "very level land and almost treeless. Beaver Creek, Little Beaver and both forks of the Sappa River, rise in this county, and the North Fork of the Smoky Hill, passes from Colorado into the south part of the county, and out of it into Wallace." In the main, farming is by irrigation.

== Demographics ==
Historical population
Census	Pop.	Note	%±
1930	359		—
1940	322		−10.3%
1950	285		−11.5%
1960	245		−14.0%
1970	278		13.5%
1980	217		−21.9%
1990	276		27.2%
2000	248		−10.1%
2010	153		−38.3%
2020	153		0.0%
U.S. Decennial Census

=== 2020 census ===
The 2020 United States census counted 153 people, 61 households, and 44 families in Kanorado. The population density was 586.2 per square mile (226.3/km^{2}). There were 79 housing units at an average density of 302.7 per square mile (116.9/km^{2}). The racial makeup was 74.51% (114) white or European American (62.75% non-Hispanic white), 1.31% (2) black or African-American, 0.0% (0) Native American or Alaska Native, 0.0% (0) Asian, 0.0% (0) Pacific Islander or Native Hawaiian, 11.11% (17) from other races, and 13.07% (20) from two or more races. Hispanic or Latino of any race was 29.41% (45) of the population.

Of the 61 households, 36.1% had children under the age of 18; 54.1% were married couples living together; 21.3% had a female householder with no spouse or partner present. 24.6% of households consisted of individuals and 11.5% had someone living alone who was 65 years of age or older. The average household size was 2.8 and the average family size was 3.0. The percent of those with a bachelor's degree or higher was estimated to be 6.5% of the population.

28.8% of the population was under the age of 18, 2.0% from 18 to 24, 19.6% from 25 to 44, 28.8% from 45 to 64, and 20.9% who were 65 years of age or older. The median age was 44.5 years. For every 100 females, there were 98.7 males. For every 100 females ages 18 and older, there were 105.7 males.

The 2016–2020 5-year American Community Survey estimates show that the median household income was $67,500 (with a margin of error of +/- $32,300) and the median family income was $58,750 (+/- $39,074). Males had a median income of $39,167 (+/- $26,786) versus $27,917 (+/- $14,176) for females. The median income for those above 16 years old was $29,167 (+/- $16,023). Approximately, 4.3% of families and 5.1% of the population were below the poverty line, including 2.3% of those under the age of 18 and 6.9% of those ages 65 or over.

=== 2010 census ===
As of the census of 2010, there were 153 people, 73 households, and 44 families residing in the city. The population density was 588.5 inhabitants per square mile (227.2/km^{2}). There were 98 housing units at an average density of 376.9 per square mile (145.5/km^{2}). The racial makeup of the city was 78.4% White, 1.3% African American, 19.6% from other races, and 0.7% from two or more races. Hispanic or Latino of any race were 37.9% of the population.

There were 73 households, of which 23.3% had children under the age of 18 living with them, 54.8% were married couples living together, 2.7% had a female householder with no husband present, 2.7% had a male householder with no wife present, and 39.7% were non-families. 35.6% of all households were made up of individuals, and 17.8% had someone living alone who was 65 years of age or older. The average household size was 2.10 and the average family size was 2.68.

The median age in the city was 50.3 years. 20.3% of residents were under the age of 18; 5.1% were between the ages of 18 and 24; 17.7% were from 25 to 44; 39.9% were from 45 to 64; and 17.0% were 65 years of age or older. The gender makeup of the city was 44.4% male and 55.6% female.

== Education ==
Kanorado is served by Goodland USD 352 public school district.

Kanorado schools were closed through school unification. The Kanorado High School mascot was the bear.

== Infrastructure ==
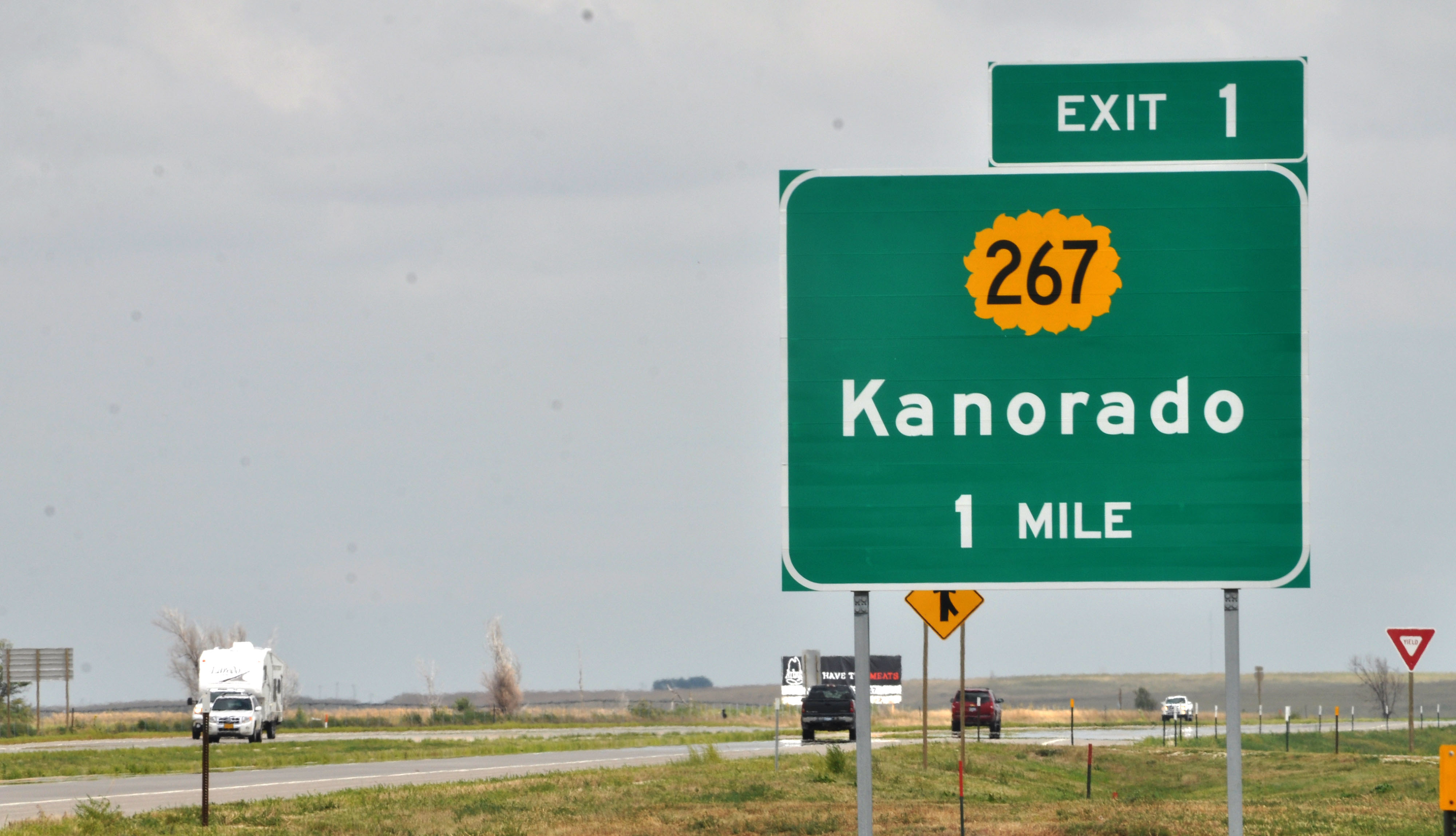
Kanorado exit on Interstate 70, the westernmost exit in Kansas (2015)

=== Transportation ===
==== Rail ====
The Kyle Railroad passes along the south edge of the city.

==== Highways ====
I-70 and U.S. Route 24 pass east to west a few blocks south of the city. Old U.S. Route 24 passes along the southern edge of the city and runs roughly parallel to the railway. Kansas Highway 267, a spur route, connects the city to I-70.

== See also ==
- List of geographic portmanteaus
- List of Grand Army of the Republic posts in Kansas
- List of highest United States cities by state or territory
