= Cleveland Run Township, Kansas =

Cleveland Run Township
- Township
- Location in Cheyenne County
- Coordinates: 39°56′14″N 101°47′52″W
- Country: United States
- State: Kansas
- County: Cheyenne

Area
  - Total: 71.96 sq mi (186.37 km^{2})
  - Land: 71.90 sq mi (186.21 km^{2})
  - Water: 0.062 sq mi (0.16 km^{2}) 0.09%
- Elevation: 3,310 ft (1,010 m)

Population (2020)
  - Total: 68
  - Density: 0.95/sq mi (0.37/km^{2})
- GNIS feature ID: 0470846

Cleveland Run Township is a township in Cheyenne County, Kansas, United States. As of the 2020 census, its population was 68.

== Geography ==
Cleveland Run Township covers an area of 71.96 square miles (186.4 km^{2}) and contains no incorporated settlements. According to the USGS, it contains two cemeteries: Hackberry and Zion.

The stream of Valley Creek runs through this township.
