= Calhoun Township, Kansas =

Calhoun Township
- Township
- Location in Cheyenne County
- Coordinates: 39°56′25″N 101°41′2″W
- Country: United States
- State: Kansas
- County: Cheyenne

Area
  - Total: 89.87 sq mi (232.77 km^{2})
  - Land: 89.25 sq mi (231.15 km^{2})
  - Water: 0.63 sq mi (1.62 km^{2}) 0.7%
- Elevation: 3,156 ft (962 m)

Population (2020)
  - Total: 41
  - Density: 0.46/sq mi (0.18/km^{2})
- GNIS feature ID: 0470879

Calhoun Township is a township in Cheyenne County, Kansas, United States. As of the 2020 census, its population was 41. In 1898, the population was 253.

== History ==
A post office named Calhoun opened in 1886. The post office was discontinued in 1888.

== Geography ==
Calhoun Township covers an area of 89.87 square miles (232.8 km^{2}) and contains no incorporated settlements. According to the USGS, it contains one cemetery, Barley.

Beaumaster Pond (historical) is within this township. The streams of Bluff Creek, Cleveland Run, Delay Creek, Hackberry Creek, Jones Canyon Creek, Nesbit Creek and Plum Creek run through this township.
