= Cheyenne County, Kansas =

County in Kansas, United States

- County
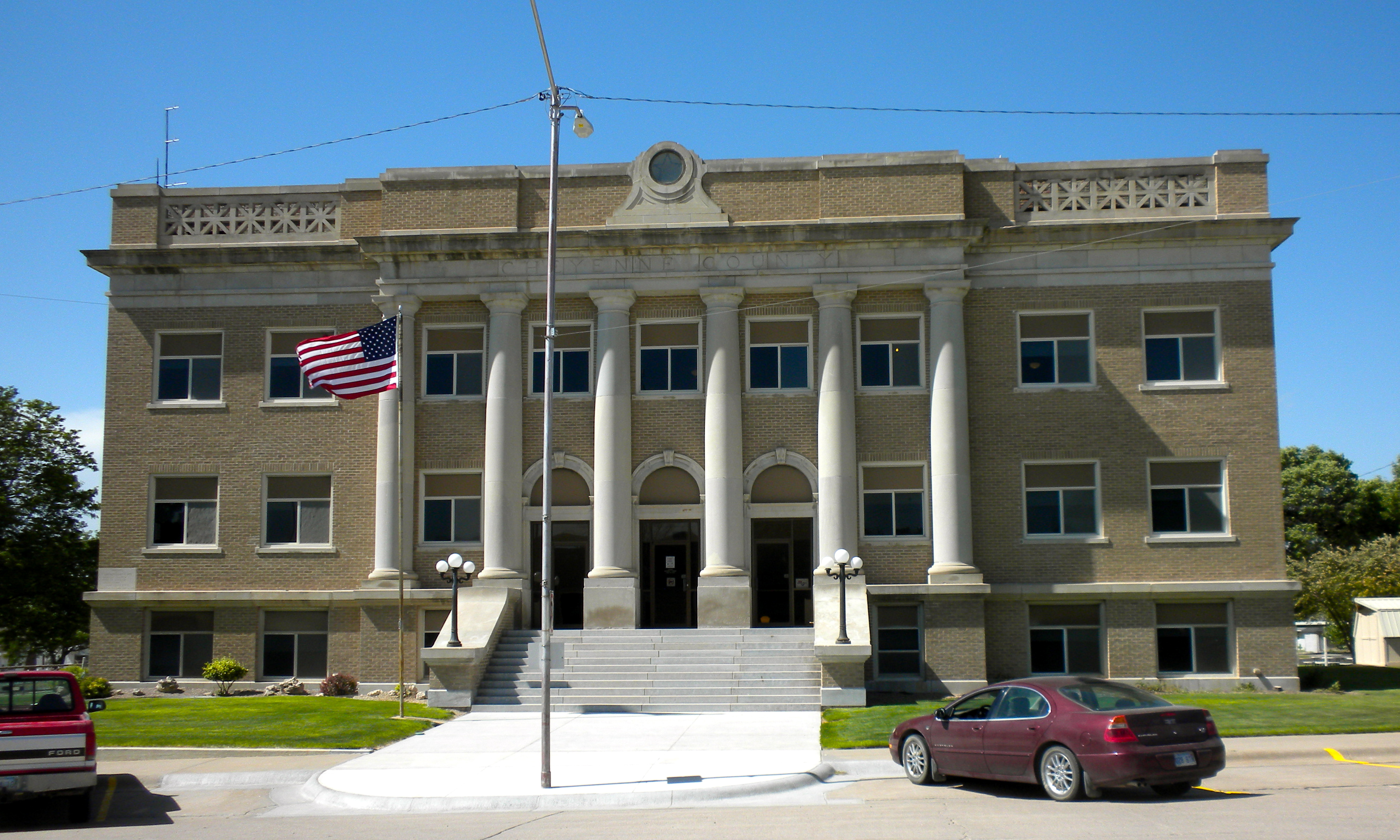
- Cheyenne County Courthouse in St. Francis (2010)

- Location within the U.S. state of Kansas
- Coordinates: 39°48′N 101°48′W
- Country: United States
- State: Kansas
- Founded: March 20, 1873
- Named for: Cheyenne tribe
- Seat: St. Francis
- Largest city: St. Francis

Area
  - Total: 1,021 sq mi (2,640 km^{2})
  - Land: 1,020 sq mi (2,600 km^{2})
  - Water: 1.1 sq mi (2.8 km^{2}) 0.1%

Population (2020)
  - Total: 2,616
  - Estimate (2025): 2,604 ▼
  - Density: 2.6/sq mi (1.0/km^{2})
- Time zone: UTC−6 (Central)
  - Summer (DST): UTC−5 (CDT)
- Area code: 785
- Congressional district: 1st
- Website: cncoks.us

Cheyenne County is a county located in the northwestern corner of the U.S. state of Kansas. Its county seat and most populous city is St. Francis. As of the 2020 census, the county population was 2,616. The county was named after the Cheyenne tribe.

== History ==
=== 19th century ===
In 1854, the Kansas Territory was organized, then in 1861 Kansas became the 34th U.S. state.

Cheyenne County was established by an act of the state legislature on 1873-03-06, which defined the original borders of the county as:

Commencing where the east line of range 37 west, intersects the fortieth degree of north latitude; thence south with said range line to the first standard parallel; thence west with said parallel to the west line of the State of Kansas; thence north with the state line to the fortieth degree of north latitude; thence east with said parallel to the place of beginning.

The county was surveyed the following year, and its first settlers arrived in 1879.

Early settlement was in and around Wano, the "T" ranch (the county's first cattle ranch) being established 9 miles (14 km) from there in 1876, and Jacob Buck and the families of A. M. Brenaman, L. R. Heaton, a man named Bateman all settling around the area. Brenaman was the first postmaster at Wano post office, established on 1880-08-23. The first storekeepers opened their store the following month, with the first school being Kepferle, and the first school district established on 1881-12-03. A dedicated school building, for 10 pupils, was donated by F. J. Graham and opened on 1882-01-10. By 1886 there were 5 school districts.

The name Wano was an Anglicization by the settlers of the Spanish word "bueno" meaning "good". It was not only the name of the post office but of its first newspaper, the Wano News, also run by Brenaman. Like the county's second newspaper, the Echo, the News was short lived and only had 5 issues. Later newspapers were the Cheyenne County Rustler, established on 1885-07-03 and originally published in Wano and later St Francis; the Frontiersman, the Cheyenne County Democrat, and the Bird City News, all published in Bird City; and the Plaindealer published in St Francis.

Independent county government was finally established in April 1886, by proclamation of Governor John A. Martin in response to a petition from the previous month. The appointed county commissioners were J. M. Ketcham, W. W. McKay and J. F. Murray; with B. W. Knott as the county clerk. Martin originally proclaimed Bird City as the county seat, as an initial temporary arrangement. An election for the county seat and for elected county and township officers was held in May 1886, and Wano was chosen as county seat. However, that first election was tainted by voter fraud and later voided by a judge. The current county seat of St. Francis was eventually chosen by an election in February 1889 and later approved by act of the state legislature on in February 1891.

== Geography ==
According to the U.S. Census Bureau, the county has a total area of 1,021 square miles (2,640 km^{2}), of which 1,020 square miles (2,600 km^{2}) is land and 1.1 square miles (2.8 km^{2}) (0.1%) is water.

=== Farming and biota ===
In 1886, 6,890 acres (2,790 ha) of the county was fenced farms and 68,807 acres (27,845 ha) unfenced farmland, comprising 12% of the county. There were 13,413 acres (5,428 ha) of cultivated land, 8,035 acres (3,252 ha) being devoted to corn, then the most lucrative crop, followed by 2,042 acres (826 ha) to sorghum, its second most lucrative, and 480 acres (190 ha) of enclosed prairie land. However, most farmers were livestock farmers.

By 1910, the leading crops were (in descending order of value) wheat, corn, barley, hay, and broomcorn. There was not originally much native timberland in the county.

=== Geology and hydrology ===
The county is crossed by the South Fork of the Republican River, whose tributaries include Bluff Creek, Cherry Creek, Plum Creek, and Hackberry Creek. Other trivers include Little Beaver Creek and a 3 miles (4.8 km) reach of Big Beaver Creek in the south-east corner of the county, and the Arickaree River in the north-west corner.

Annual precipitation for the county averaged 18.82 inches between 1991 and 2020. Between 2021 and 2024 it averaged 18.90, 12.40, 15.40, 12.86, and 19.43, respectively.

The soil is mainly sandy, with limited amounts of limestone in some of the streams.

=== Adjacent counties ===
- Dundy County, Nebraska (north/Mountain Time border)
- Rawlins County (east)
- Sherman County (south/Mountain Time border)
- Kit Carson County, Colorado (southwest/Mountain Time border)
- Yuma County, Colorado (west/Mountain Time border)

=== Major highways ===
Sources: National Atlas, U.S. Census Bureau

- U.S. Route 36
- Kansas Highway 27
- Kansas Highway 161

=== Time Zones ===
The county is in the Central Time zone, but is bordered by the Mountain Time Zone in three directions; it is the only county in the United States to have this characteristic. Dundy County, Nebraska to the north, Yuma County, Colorado and Kit Carson County, Colorado to the west, and Sherman County to the south are all located in the Mountain Time Zone. As a result, Rawlins County is Cheyenne County's only neighbor to also observe Central Time.

== Demographics ==
Historical population
Census	Pop.	Note	%±
1880	37		—
1890	4,401		11,794.6%
1900	2,640		−40.0%
1910	4,248		60.9%
1920	5,587		31.5%
1930	6,948		24.4%
1940	6,221		−10.5%
1950	5,668		−8.9%
1960	4,708		−16.9%
1970	4,256		−9.6%
1980	3,678		−13.6%
1990	3,243		−11.8%
2000	3,165		−2.4%
2010	2,726		−13.9%
2020	2,616		−4.0%
2025 (est.)	2,604	▼	−0.5%
U.S. Decennial Census; 1790–1960 1900–1990; 1990–2000 2010–2020

In 1886 there were 2607 people in the county. By 1910 this had risen to 4248.

=== 2020 census ===
As of the 2020 census, the county had a population of 2,616. The median age was 46.4 years. 22.0% of residents were under the age of 18 and 26.6% of residents were 65 years of age or older. For every 100 females there were 102.0 males, and for every 100 females age 18 and over there were 96.3 males age 18 and over. 0.0% of residents lived in urban areas, while 100.0% lived in rural areas.

The racial makeup of the county was 87.2% White, 0.3% Black or African American, 0.3% American Indian and Alaska Native, 0.5% Asian, 0.0% Native Hawaiian and Pacific Islander, 4.0% from some other race, and 7.8% from two or more races. Hispanic or Latino residents of any race comprised 9.1% of the population.

There were 1,181 households in the county, of which 24.6% had children under the age of 18 living with them and 24.9% had a female householder with no spouse or partner present. About 34.4% of all households were made up of individuals and 18.3% had someone living alone who was 65 years of age or older.

There were 1,464 housing units, of which 19.3% were vacant. Among occupied housing units, 74.9% were owner-occupied and 25.1% were renter-occupied. The homeowner vacancy rate was 3.2% and the rental vacancy rate was 11.6%.

=== 2000 census ===
As of the 2000 census, there were 3,165 people, 1,360 households, and 919 families residing in the county. The population density was 3 people per square mile (1.2 people/km^{2}). There were 1,636 housing units at an average density of 2 per square mile (0.77/km^{2}). The racial makeup of the county was 97.91% White, 0.13% Black or African American, 0.09% Native American, 0.32% Asian, 0.03% Pacific Islander, 0.98% from other races, and 0.54% from two or more races. Hispanic or Latino of any race were 2.59% of the population.

There were 1,360 households, out of which 27.60% had children under the age of 18 living with them, 60.10% were married couples living together, 5.10% had a female householder with no husband present, and 32.40% were non-families. 30.80% of all households were made up of individuals, and 17.30% had someone living alone who was 65 years of age or older. The average household size was 2.29 and the average family size was 2.85.

In the county, the population was spread out, with 23.80% under the age of 18, 5.10% from 18 to 24, 22.70% from 25 to 44, 21.80% from 45 to 64, and 26.60% who were 65 years of age or older. The median age was 44 years. For every 100 females there were 97.30 males. For every 100 females age 18 and over, there were 92.40 males.

The median income for a household in the county was $30,599, and the median income for a family was $34,816. Males had a median income of $24,976 versus $19,569 for females. The per capita income for the county was $17,862. About 7.40% of families and 9.40% of the population were below the poverty line, including 11.80% of those under age 18 and 6.70% of those age 65 or over.

== Government ==
=== Presidential elections ===
Cheyenne County is a Republican stronghold. Only four Republican presidential candidates from 1888 to the present day have failed to carry the county, the most recent of which ironically being Kansas Governor Alf Landon in 1936 as he also failed to win the state's electoral votes.

Presidential election results

United States presidential election results for Cheyenne County, Kansas
Year	Republican		Democratic		Third party(ies)	
Year	No.	%	No.	%	No.	%
1888	779	63.08%	420	34.01%	36	2.91%
1892	505	50.45%	0	0.00%	496	49.55%
1896	327	49.55%	322	48.79%	11	1.67%
1900	348	54.12%	286	44.48%	9	1.40%
1904	446	72.88%	96	15.69%	70	11.44%
1908	486	54.30%	339	37.88%	70	7.82%
1912	140	15.87%	301	34.13%	441	50.00%
1916	498	31.78%	787	50.22%	282	18.00%
1920	1,079	62.41%	471	27.24%	179	10.35%
1924	1,119	50.38%	485	21.84%	617	27.78%
1928	1,466	69.61%	586	27.83%	54	2.56%
1932	979	34.61%	1,716	60.66%	134	4.74%
1936	1,241	42.43%	1,673	57.20%	11	0.38%
1940	1,760	64.14%	971	35.39%	13	0.47%
1944	1,610	67.99%	736	31.08%	22	0.93%
1948	1,219	53.51%	978	42.93%	81	3.56%
1952	1,915	75.63%	597	23.58%	20	0.79%
1956	1,479	68.79%	663	30.84%	8	0.37%
1960	1,622	71.42%	636	28.01%	13	0.57%
1964	1,147	56.23%	886	43.43%	7	0.34%
1968	1,423	70.66%	412	20.46%	179	8.89%
1972	1,440	75.51%	399	20.92%	68	3.57%
1976	1,008	55.84%	758	41.99%	39	2.16%
1980	1,330	73.89%	358	19.89%	112	6.22%
1984	1,442	79.06%	356	19.52%	26	1.43%
1988	1,105	63.40%	594	34.08%	44	2.52%
1992	863	49.17%	407	23.19%	485	27.64%
1996	1,211	66.83%	422	23.29%	179	9.88%
2000	1,312	75.97%	350	20.27%	65	3.76%
2004	1,353	79.96%	320	18.91%	19	1.12%
2008	1,148	76.64%	323	21.56%	27	1.80%
2012	1,159	81.28%	233	16.34%	34	2.38%
2016	1,173	83.37%	181	12.86%	53	3.77%
2020	1,183	82.79%	224	15.68%	22	1.54%
2024	1,185	83.33%	206	14.49%	31	2.18%

=== Laws ===
Following amendment to the Kansas Constitution in 1986, the county remained a prohibition, or "dry", county until 2000, when voters approved the sale of alcoholic liquor by the individual drink with a 30% food sales requirement.

== Education ==
=== Unified school districts ===
- Cheylin USD 103
- St. Francis Schools USD 297

== Communities ==
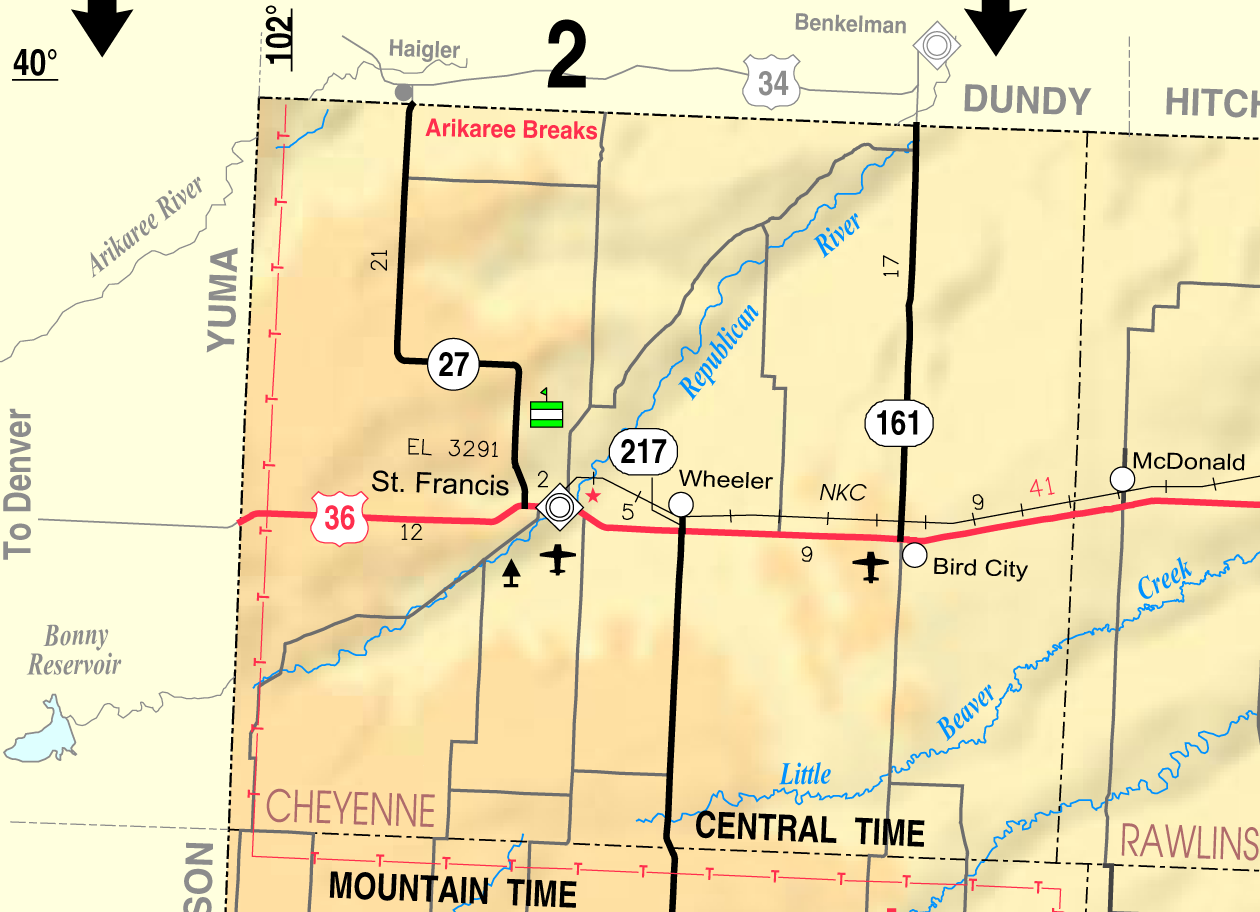
2005 map of Cheyenne County (map legend)

List of townships / incorporated cities / unincorporated communities / extinct former communities within Cheyenne County.

=== Cities ===
- Bird City
- St. Francis (county seat)

=== Unincorporated communities ===
- Wheeler

=== Ghost towns ===
- Marney

=== Post offices ===
In 1886 there were six post offices in the county: Bird City, Calhoun, Lawnridge, Marney, Orlando, and Wano. In 1888, four had been added — Clugh, Gurney, Jaqua, and Neville — and Wano had become St Francis. By 1910 this had shrunk to just four: Bird City, Jaqua, St. Francis, and Wheeler.

=== Townships ===
Cheyenne County is divided into seven townships. None of the cities within the county are considered governmentally independent, and all figures for the township include those of the cities. In the following table, the population center is the largest city (or cities) included in that township's population total, if it is of a significant size.

Township	FIPS	Population center	Population	Population density /km^{2} (/sq mi)	Land area km^{2} (sq mi)	Water area km^{2} (sq mi)	Water %	Geographic coordinates
Benkelman	06025		57	0 (1)	186 (72)	0 (0)	0%	39°37′8″N 101°54′35″W
Bird City	06850	Bird City	771	1 (2)	884 (341)	0 (0)	0.02%	39°45′30″N 101°31′41″W
Calhoun	09950		57	0 (1)	231 (89)	2 (1)	0.70%	39°56′8″N 101°39′18″W
Cleveland Run	14150		67	0 (1)	186 (72)	0 (0)	0.08%	39°52′35″N 101°48′20″W
Jaqua	35025		46	0 (1)	124 (48)	0 (0)	0.01%	39°39′48″N 102°1′20″W
Orlando	53050		63	1 (2)	93 (36)	0 (0)	0%	39°45′36″N 101°41′0″W
Wano	75375	St. Francis	2,104	2 (6)	937 (362)	0 (0)	0.05%	39°45′27″N 101°50′4″W
Sources: "Census 2000 U.S. Gazetteer Files". U.S. Census Bureau, Geography Division. Archived from the original on August 2, 2002.

Cheyenne started off in 1883 as a single municipal township attached to Rawlins County for judicial and financial purposes. In the May 1886 election before any county or townships officers had been elected and the county seat had been chosen, there were intended to be three townships: Bird City, Wano, and a township named Hour-glass, dividing up what had by then become three municipal townships although swapping some parts of the municipal townships around for the proposed new townships.

In the end, the county initially had 13 townships: Beaver, Benkelman, Bird City, Calhoun, Cherry Creek, Cleveland Run, Dent, Eureka, Jaqua, Lawn Ridge, Nuttycombe, Orlando, and Wano. At the start of the 20th century, there were 17 townships: the aforementioned 13 plus Alexander, Evergreen, Jefferson, and Porter, all added some time between 1888 and 1890. There since has been some consolidation in the 1970s.

== See also ==
Community information for Kansas

- Kansas locations by per capita income
- List of counties in Kansas
- List of townships in Kansas
- List of cities in Kansas
- List of unincorporated communities in Kansas
- List of ghost towns in Kansas
