= Ruleton, Kansas =

Unincorporated community in Sherman County, Kansas

- Unincorporated community
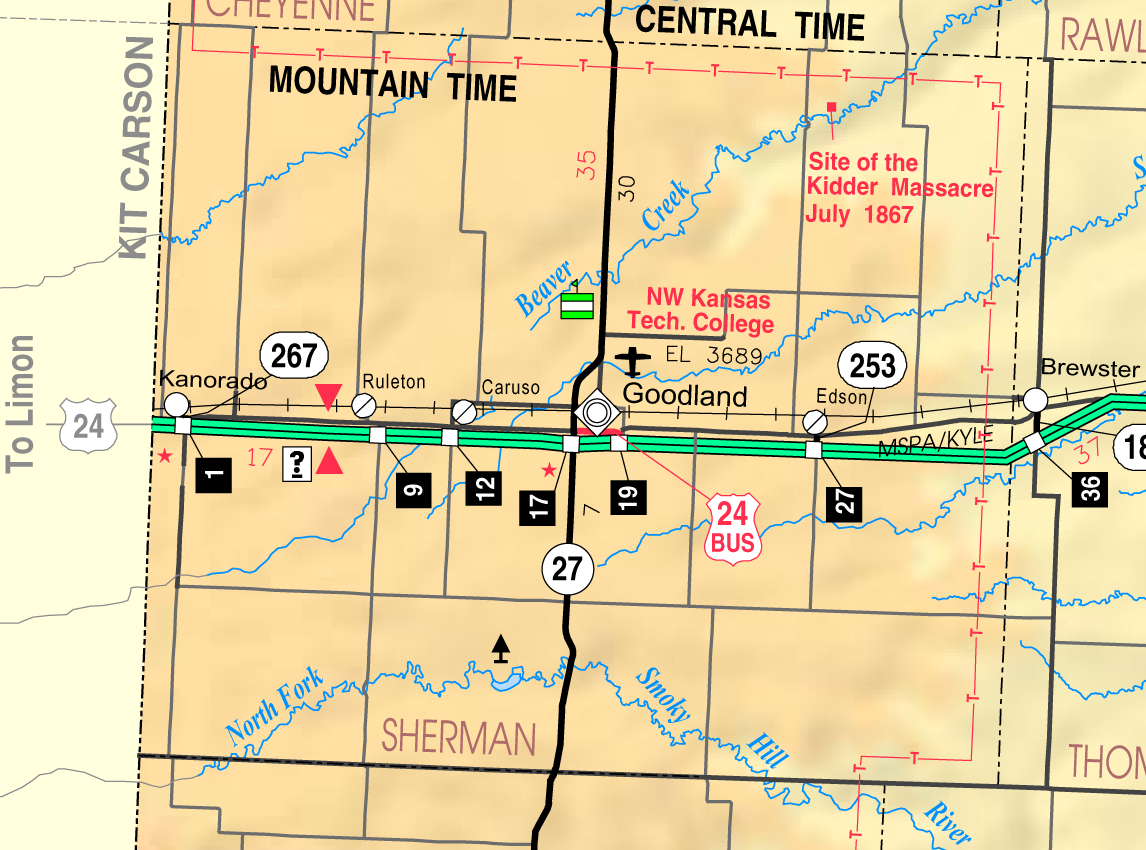
- KDOT map of Sherman County (legend)

- Location within Kansas Location within the United States
- Coordinates: 39°20′22″N 101°53′22″W
- Country: United States
- State: Kansas
- County: Sherman
- Elevation: 3,793 ft (1,156 m)
- Time zone: UTC-7 (Mountain (MST))
  - Summer (DST): UTC-6 (MDT)
- Area code: 785
- FIPS code: 20-61675
- GNIS ID: 471240

Ruleton is an unincorporated community in Sherman County, Kansas, United States.

== History ==
The first post office in Ruleton was established in 1887.

Located in Ruleton is the Ruleton School, which is listed on the National Register of Historic Places.
