= McPherson Township, Sherman County, Kansas =

Township in Sherman County, Kansas, U.S.

McPherson Township
- Township
- Location in Sherman County
- Coordinates: 39°10′45″N 101°56′02″W
- Country: United States
- State: Kansas
- County: Sherman

Area
  - Total: 67.343 sq mi (174.42 km^{2})
  - Land: 67.343 sq mi (174.42 km^{2})
  - Water: 0 sq mi (0 km^{2}) 0%

Population (2020)
  - Total: 44
  - Density: 0.65/sq mi (0.25/km^{2})
- Time zone: UTC-7 (MST)
  - Summer (DST): UTC-6 (MDT)
- Area code: 785
- GNIS feature ID: 471298

McPherson Township is one of thirteen townships in Sherman County, Kansas, United States. As of the 2020 census, its population was 44.

== Geography ==
McPherson Township is located in the southwestern corner of the county, along the Colorado border.

It lies southwest of the county seat of Goodland. There are no communities in the township.

The north fork of the Smoky Hill River flows through McPherson Township.

=== Adjacent townships ===
Lincoln Township, Sherman County
Stateline Township, Sherman County	northwest	north
Kit Carson County, Colorado	west	self	east	Smoky Township, Sherman County
		south	southeast	Sharon Springs Township, Wallace County
Weskan Township, Wallace County

== Transportation ==
Only local roads are located in McPherson Township.

== Government ==
As an active township, McPherson Township is governed by a three-member board, composed of the township trustee, the township treasurer, and the township clerk. The trustee acts as the township executive.
