= Jaqua Township, Kansas =

Jaqua Township
- Township
- Location in Cheyenne County
- Coordinates: 39°40′20″N 102°01′24″W
- Country: United States
- State: Kansas
- County: Cheyenne

Area
  - Total: 47.9 sq mi (124.1 km^{2})
  - Land: 47.91 sq mi (124.09 km^{2})
  - Water: 0.0039 sq mi (0.01 km^{2}) 0.01%
- Elevation: 3,488 ft (1,063 m)

Population (2020)
  - Total: 35
  - Density: 0.73/sq mi (0.28/km^{2})
- GNIS feature ID: 0485200

Jaqua Township is a township in Cheyenne County, Kansas, United States. As of the 2020 census, its population was 35.

== History ==
Jaqua was issued a post office in 1887. The post office was discontinued in 1919.

== Geography ==
Jaqua Township covers an area of 47.91 square miles (124.1 km^{2}) and contains no incorporated settlements. According to the USGS, it contains three cemeteries: Jaqua, Zion and Zion Lutheran.

The stream of Cowpe Creek runs through this township.
