= Benkelman Township, Kansas =

Benkelman Township
- Township
- Location in Cheyenne County
- Coordinates: 39°41′03″N 101°55′00″W
- Country: United States
- State: Kansas
- County: Cheyenne

Area
  - Total: 71.93 sq mi (186.31 km^{2})
  - Land: 71.93 sq mi (186.31 km^{2})
  - Water: 0 sq mi (0 km^{2}) 0%
- Elevation: 3,524 ft (1,074 m)

Population (2020)
  - Total: 42
  - Density: 0.58/sq mi (0.23/km^{2})
- GNIS feature ID: 0485202

Benkelman Township is a township in Cheyenne County, Kansas, United States. As of the 2020 census, its population was 42.

== Geography ==
Benkelman Township covers an area of 71.94 square miles (186.3 km^{2}) and contains no incorporated settlements. According to the USGS, it contains one cemetery, Battle Creek.

The streams of Battle Creek, Big Timber Creek and Crosby Creek run through this township.
