= Sappa Creek =

River in Kansas and Nebraska, U.S.

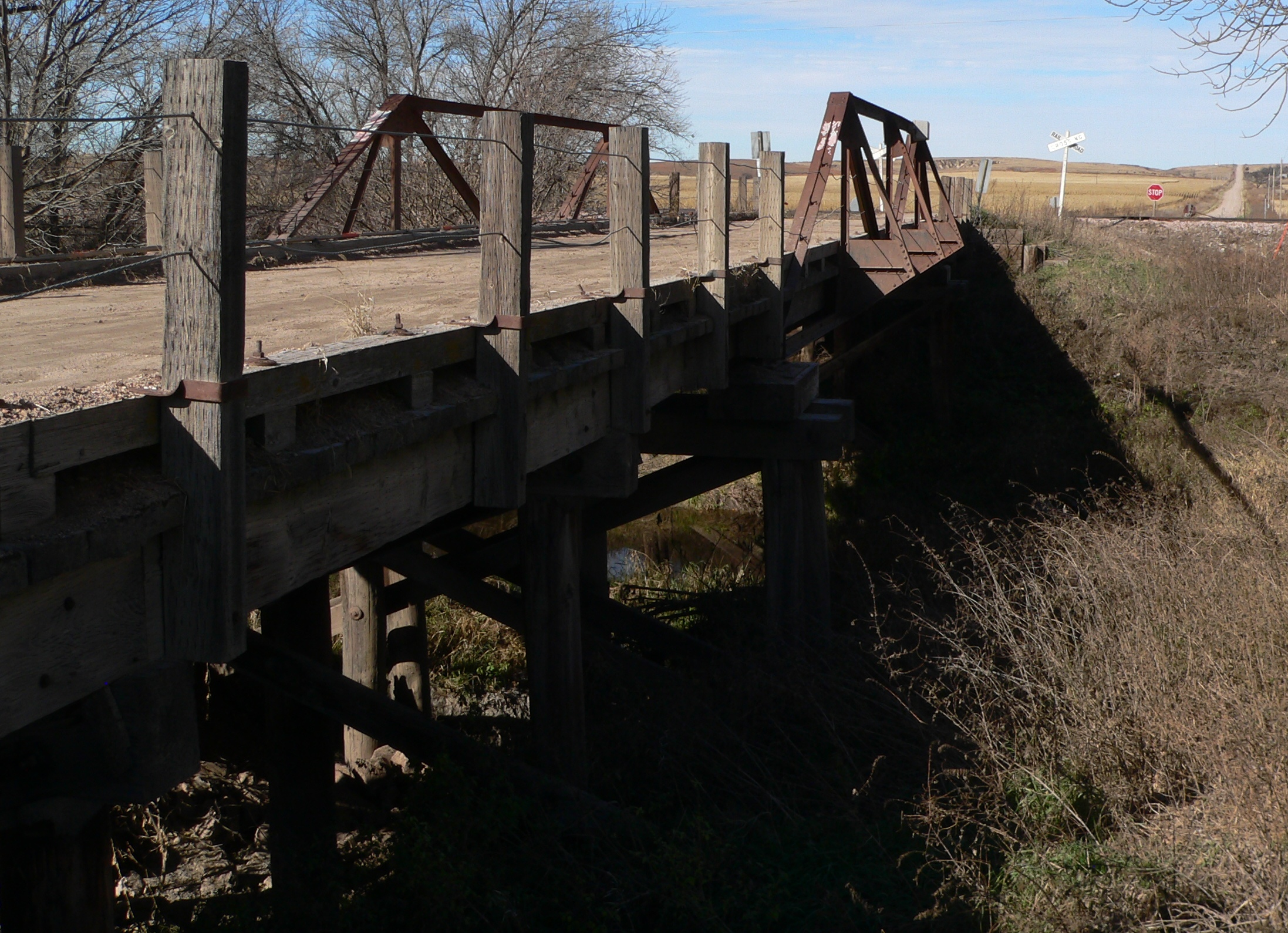
- Sappa Creek Bridge spanning the creek

Location
- Country: United States
- State: Kansas, Nebraska

Physical characteristics
- Source confluence
  - location: Oberlin, Kansas
  - coordinates: 39°47′05″N 100°34′42″W
  - elevation: 2,570 ft (780 m)
- Mouth: Republican River
  - location: Orleans, Nebraska
  - coordinates: 40°06′52″N 99°28′46″W
  - elevation: 1,965 ft (599 m)
- Length: 150 mi (240 km)

Basin features
- Progression: Sappa Creek → Republican River → Kansas River → Missouri River → Mississippi River → Gulf of Mexico
- Tributaries
  - right: Beaver Creek

Sappa Creek is a stream in the central Great Plains of North America. A tributary of the Republican River, it flows for 150 miles (240 km) through the American states of Kansas and Nebraska.

== Geography ==
Sappa Creek originates in the High Plains of northwest Kansas. It is formed by the confluence of North Fork Sappa Creek and South Fork Sappa Creek located roughly 3.5 miles (5.6 km) southwest of Oberlin, Kansas in Decatur County. From there, in flows generally northeast into south-central Nebraska. In west-central Harlan County, Nebraska, it joins the Republican River.

== History ==
In 1878, the Sappa Creek valley in Kansas was the scene of the last raid by Native Americans (Indians) in Kansas. In the Northern Cheyenne Exodus after the Battle of Punished Woman's Fork, a band of Cheyenne needing horses and provisions raged through the valley, killing more than 30 civilians and raping several women. Several Cheyenne elderly, women, and children were also killed in Kansas by soldiers and civilians during the Cheyenne exodus. In Oberlin, the Decatur County Last Indian Raid Museum commemorates the Cheyenne raid.

== See also ==
- List of rivers of Kansas
