= Caruso, Kansas =

Unincorporated community in Sherman County, Kansas

- Unincorporated community
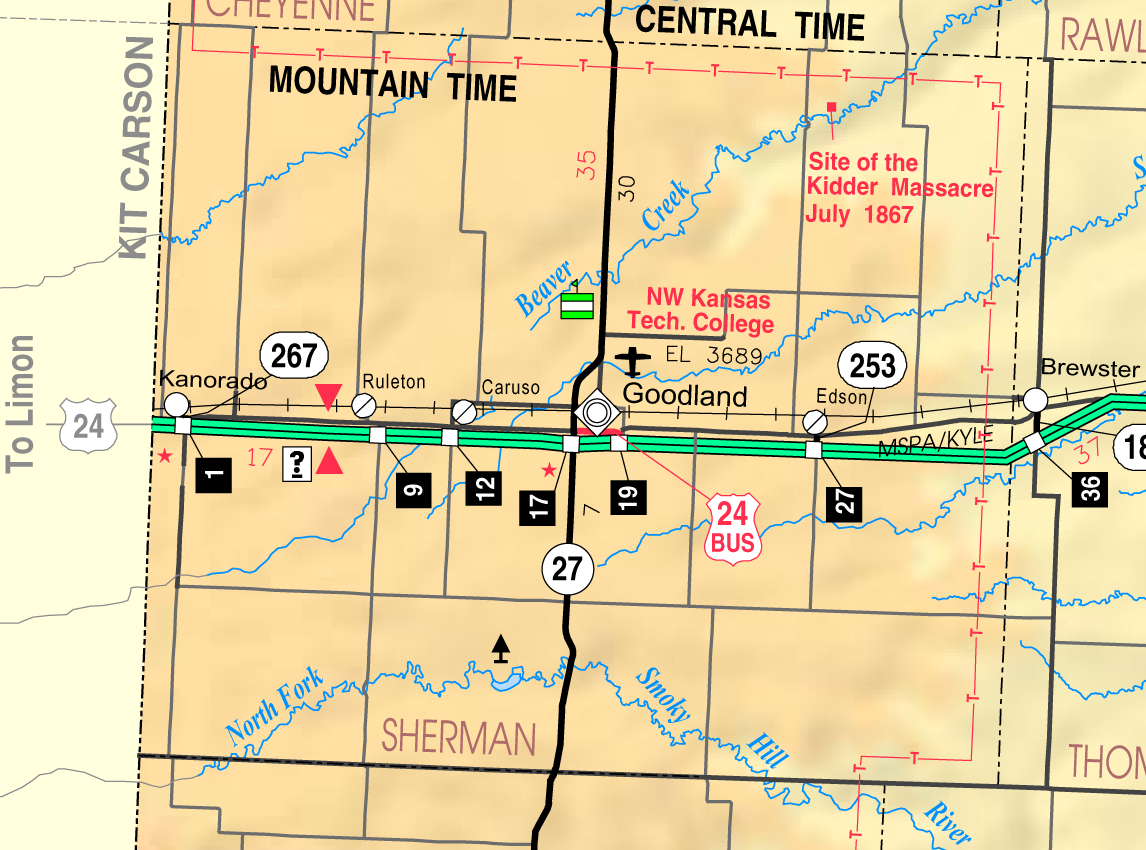
- KDOT map of Sherman County (legend)

- Location within Kansas Location within the United States
- Coordinates: 39°20′19″N 101°48′56″W
- Country: United States
- State: Kansas
- County: Sherman
- Elevation: 3,714 ft (1,132 m)
- Time zone: UTC-7 (Mountain (MST))
  - Summer (DST): UTC-6 (MDT)
- Area code: 785
- FIPS code: 20-10875
- GNIS ID: 484551

Caruso is an unincorporated community in Sherman County, Kansas, United States.
