= Bird City Township, Kansas =

Bird City Township
- Township
- Location in Cheyenne County
- Coordinates: 39°45′3″N 101°32′1″W
- Country: United States
- State: Kansas
- County: Cheyenne

Area
  - Total: 341.43 sq mi (884.29 km^{2})
  - Land: 341.36 sq mi (884.11 km^{2})
  - Water: 0.073 sq mi (0.19 km^{2}) 0.02%
- Elevation: 3,494 ft (1,065 m)

Population (2020)
  - Total: 655
  - Density: 1.92/sq mi (0.741/km^{2})
- GNIS feature ID: 0470882

Bird City Township is a township in Cheyenne County, Kansas, United States. As of the 2020 census, its population was 655.

== Geography ==
Bird City Township covers an area of 341.43 square miles (884.3 km^{2}) and contains one incorporated settlement, Bird City. According to the USGS, it contains three cemeteries: Bird City, Community and Evergreen.

Cole Pond (historical) and Leach Pond are within this township.

== Transportation ==
Bird City Township contains five airports or landing strips: Bird City Airport, Bursch Airport, Gillilands Farm Airport, Stout Landing Strip and Wilkens Airport.
