= Sherman County, Kansas =

County in Kansas, United States

- County
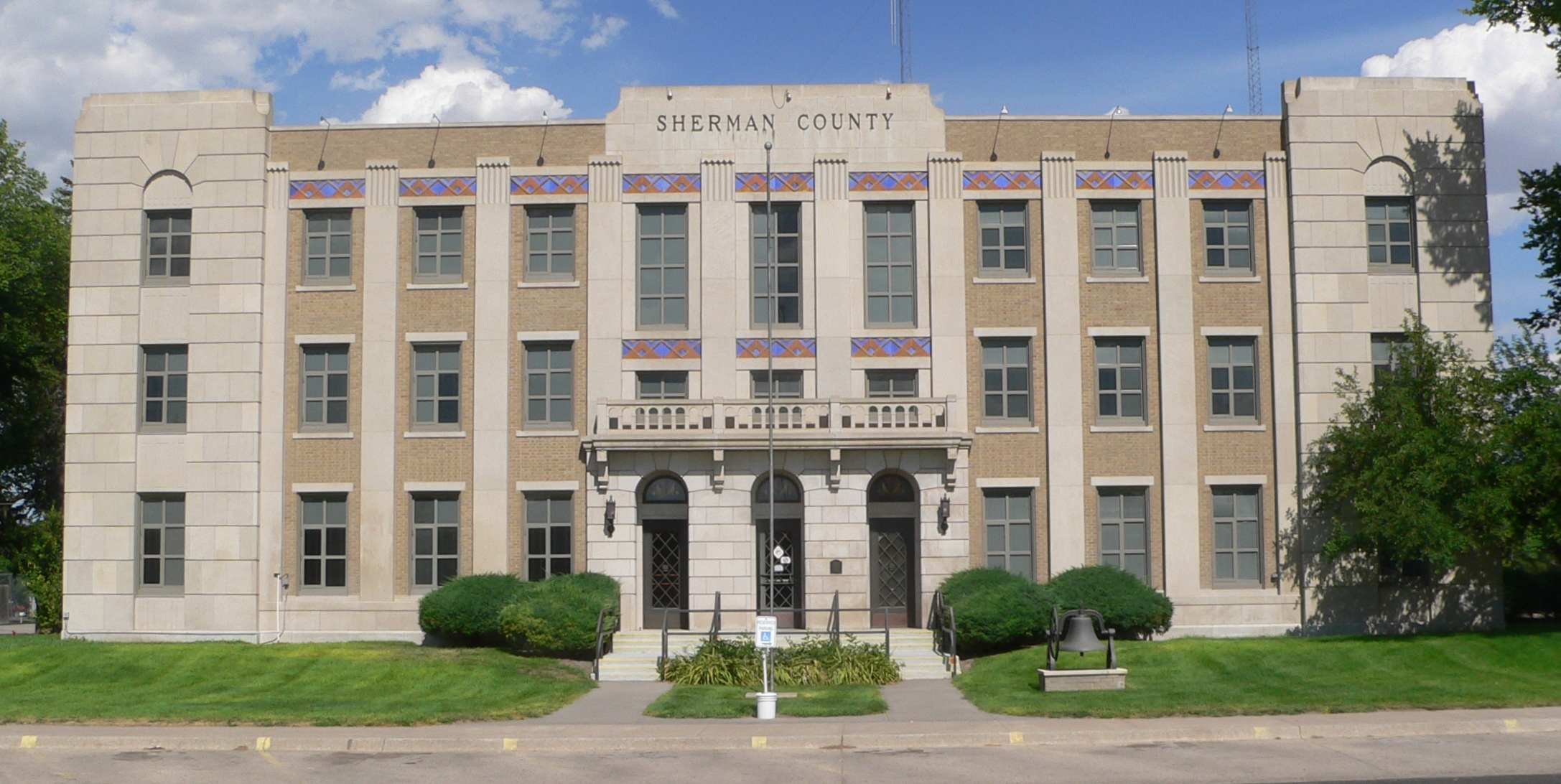
- Sherman County Courthouse in Goodland (2012)

- Location within the U.S. state of Kansas
- Coordinates: 39°21′N 101°43′W
- Country: United States
- State: Kansas
- Founded: September 20, 1886
- Named for: William Tecumseh Sherman
- Seat: Goodland
- Largest city: Goodland

Area
  - Total: 1,056 sq mi (2,740 km^{2})
  - Land: 1,056 sq mi (2,740 km^{2})
  - Water: 0.2 sq mi (0.52 km^{2}) 0.02%

Population (2020)
  - Total: 5,927
  - Estimate (2025): 5,763 ▼
  - Density: 5.6/sq mi (2.2/km^{2})
- Time zone: UTC−7 (Mountain)
  - Summer (DST): UTC−6 (MDT)
- Congressional district: 1st
- Website: shermancountyks.gov

Sherman County is a county located in the U.S. state of Kansas. Its county seat is Goodland. As of the 2020 census, the county population was 5,927. Sherman County was created by the Legislature of 1873, and named after general William Sherman, a general during the American Civil War.

== History ==
=== Early history ===
For many millennia, the Great Plains of North America was inhabited by nomadic Native Americans. From the 16th century to 18th century, the Kingdom of France claimed ownership of large parts of North America. In 1762, after the French and Indian War, France secretly ceded New France to Spain, per the Treaty of Fontainebleau.

=== 19th century ===
In 1802, Spain returned most of the land to France, but keeping title to about 7,500 square miles. In 1803, most of the land for modern day Kansas was acquired by the United States from France as part of the 828,000 square mile Louisiana Purchase for 2.83 cents per acre.

In 1854, the Kansas Territory was organized, then in 1861 Kansas became the 34th U.S. state. In 1886, Sherman County was established.

== Geography ==
According to the U.S. Census Bureau, the county has a total area of 1,056 square miles (2,740 km^{2}), of which 1,056 square miles (2,740 km^{2}) is land and 0.2 square miles (0.52 km^{2}) (0.02%) is water.

Sherman County is one of only four Kansas counties to observe Mountain Time. Since Sherman County is part of the Wichita media market and the local broadcast stations are repeat signals of Wichita affiliates, prime-time programming in the county is aired from 6 to 9 p.m. local time, rather than 7 to 10 p.m. as is normal in the Central and Mountain time zones. However, cable providers carry the ABC and NBC affiliates from both Wichita and Denver, affording viewers the opportunity to view programs on those networks at the normal prime-time hours.

=== Adjacent counties ===
- Cheyenne County (north/Central Time border)
- Rawlins County (northeast/Central Time border)
- Thomas County (east/Central Time border)
- Logan County (southeast/Central Time border)
- Wallace County (south)
- Kit Carson County, Colorado (west)

=== Major highways ===
- I-70
- US-24
- K-27

== Demographics ==
Historical population
Census	Pop.	Note	%±
1880	13		—
1890	5,261		40,369.2%
1900	3,341		−36.5%
1910	4,549		36.2%
1920	5,592		22.9%
1930	7,400		32.3%
1940	6,421		−13.2%
1950	7,373		14.8%
1960	6,682		−9.4%
1970	7,792		16.6%
1980	7,759		−0.4%
1990	6,926		−10.7%
2000	6,760		−2.4%
2010	6,010		−11.1%
2020	5,927		−1.4%
2025 (est.)	5,763	▼	−2.8%
U.S. Decennial Census; 1790-1960 1900-1990; 1990-2000 2010-2020

=== 2020 census ===
As of the 2020 census, the county had a population of 5,927. The median age was 38.4 years. 24.4% of residents were under the age of 18 and 19.8% of residents were 65 years of age or older. For every 100 females there were 101.5 males, and for every 100 females age 18 and over there were 100.0 males age 18 and over.

The racial makeup of the county was 84.8% White, 1.7% Black or African American, 0.3% American Indian and Alaska Native, 0.3% Asian, 0.0% Native Hawaiian and Pacific Islander, 5.5% from some other race, and 7.3% from two or more races. Hispanic or Latino residents of any race comprised 13.0% of the population.

74.9% of residents lived in urban areas, while 25.1% lived in rural areas.

There were 2,447 households in the county, of which 29.3% had children under the age of 18 living with them and 25.4% had a female householder with no spouse or partner present. About 33.5% of all households were made up of individuals and 14.9% had someone living alone who was 65 years of age or older.

There were 2,934 housing units, of which 16.6% were vacant. Among occupied housing units, 68.7% were owner-occupied and 31.3% were renter-occupied. The homeowner vacancy rate was 2.4% and the rental vacancy rate was 16.3%.

=== 2000 census ===
As of the census of 2000, there were 6,760 people, 2,758 households, and 1,781 families residing in the county. The population density was 6 people per square mile (2.3 people/km^{2}). There were 3,184 housing units at an average density of 3 per square mile (1.2/km^{2}). The racial makeup of the county was 93.83% White, 0.36% Black or African American, 0.33% Native American, 0.19% Asian, 0.16% Pacific Islander, 4.14% from other races, and 0.99% from two or more races. 8.45% of the population were Hispanic or Latino of any race.

There were 2,758 households, out of which 29.20% had children under the age of 18 living with them, 55.80% were married couples living together, 6.00% had a female householder with no husband present, and 35.40% were non-families. 29.20% of all households were made up of individuals, and 14.40% had someone living alone who was 65 years of age or older. The average household size was 2.40 and the average family size was 3.00.

In the county, the population was spread out, with 24.60% under the age of 18, 11.80% from 18 to 24, 23.90% from 25 to 44, 22.80% from 45 to 64, and 17.10% who were 65 years of age or older. The median age was 38 years. For every 100 females there were 104.50 males. For every 100 females age 18 and over, there were 101.40 males.

The median income for a household in the county was $32,684, and the median income for a family was $38,824. Males had a median income of $28,012 versus $20,927 for females. The per capita income for the county was $16,761. About 9.70% of families and 12.90% of the population were below the poverty line, including 16.90% of those under age 18 and 7.30% of those age 65 or over.

== Government ==
Sherman County has been predominantly carried by Republican candidates at the presidential level for a century, as is the case with the majority of rural counties. However, Lyndon B. Johnson narrowly carried the county in 1964, the only Democrat to do so since 1936.

=== Presidential elections ===
Presidential election results

United States presidential election results for Sherman County, Kansas
Year	Republican		Democratic		Third party(ies)	
Year	No.	%	No.	%	No.	%
1888	803	55.69%	481	33.36%	158	10.96%
1892	571	43.16%	0	0.00%	752	56.84%
1896	291	39.81%	437	59.78%	3	0.41%
1900	380	46.51%	418	51.16%	19	2.33%
1904	465	60.55%	231	30.08%	72	9.38%
1908	439	43.64%	508	50.50%	59	5.86%
1912	129	13.11%	465	47.26%	390	39.63%
1916	582	30.83%	1,196	63.35%	110	5.83%
1920	1,066	54.33%	789	40.21%	107	5.45%
1924	1,122	45.89%	528	21.60%	795	32.52%
1928	2,028	74.61%	630	23.18%	60	2.21%
1932	1,112	32.19%	2,110	61.09%	232	6.72%
1936	1,159	38.26%	1,814	59.89%	56	1.85%
1940	1,569	52.16%	1,399	46.51%	40	1.33%
1944	1,608	60.07%	1,021	38.14%	48	1.79%
1948	1,380	50.00%	1,289	46.70%	91	3.30%
1952	2,403	70.41%	941	27.57%	69	2.02%
1956	1,825	64.97%	962	34.25%	22	0.78%
1960	2,030	65.08%	1,074	34.43%	15	0.48%
1964	1,463	48.60%	1,522	50.56%	25	0.83%
1968	1,803	57.53%	954	30.44%	377	12.03%
1972	2,225	69.92%	785	24.67%	172	5.41%
1976	1,671	50.15%	1,573	47.21%	88	2.64%
1980	2,315	68.86%	779	23.17%	268	7.97%
1984	2,702	78.02%	714	20.62%	47	1.36%
1988	1,929	62.94%	1,082	35.30%	54	1.76%
1992	1,630	49.73%	810	24.71%	838	25.56%
1996	2,110	68.42%	736	23.87%	238	7.72%
2000	1,894	70.62%	681	25.39%	107	3.99%
2004	2,088	75.60%	632	22.88%	42	1.52%
2008	1,959	72.45%	688	25.44%	57	2.11%
2012	1,976	75.33%	577	22.00%	70	2.67%
2016	2,089	79.98%	347	13.28%	176	6.74%
2020	2,269	83.20%	396	14.52%	62	2.27%
2024	2,161	83.34%	379	14.62%	53	2.04%

=== Laws ===
Sherman County was a prohibition, or "dry", county until the Kansas Constitution was amended in 1986 and voters approved the sale of alcoholic liquor by the individual drink with a 30 percent food sales requirement.

== Education ==
=== Colleges ===
- Northwest Kansas Technical College

=== Unified school districts ===
- Brewster USD 314
- Goodland USD 352

== Communities ==
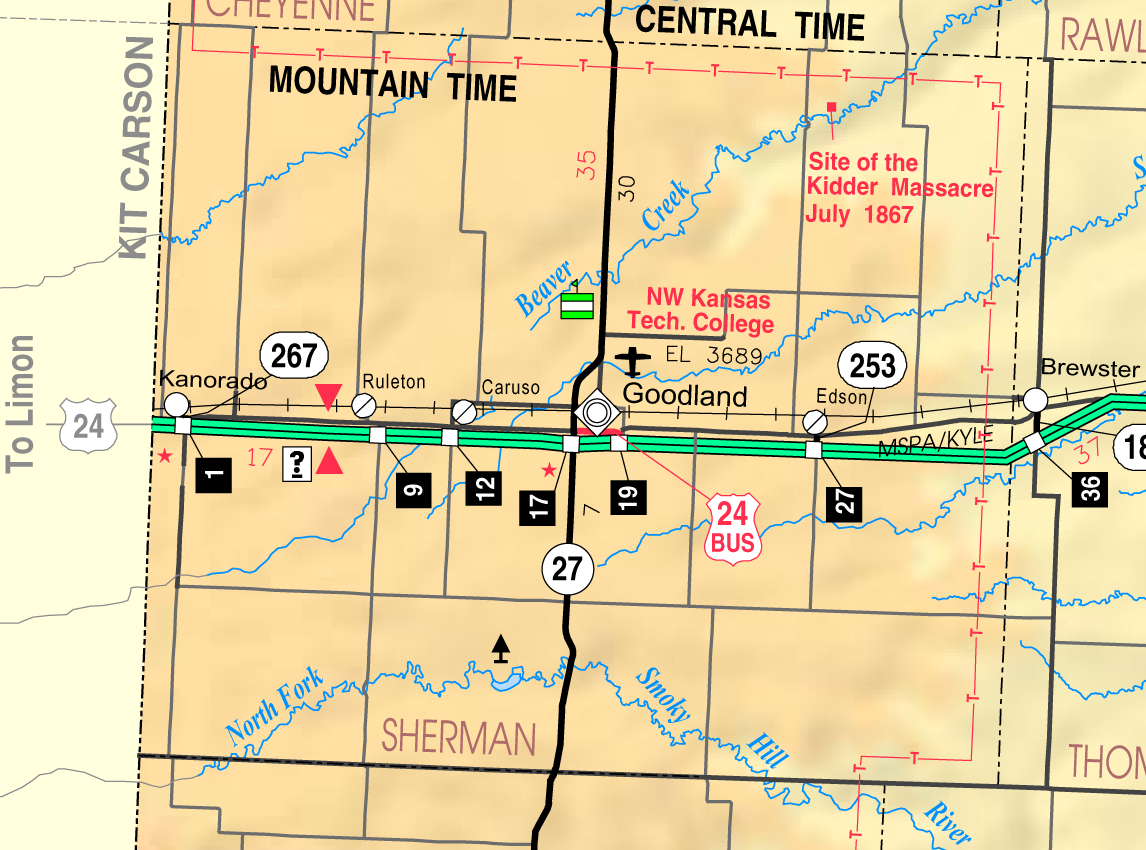
2005 map of Sherman County (map legend)

List of townships / incorporated cities / unincorporated communities / extinct former communities within Sherman County.
† means a community is designated a Census-Designated Place (CDP) by the United States Census Bureau.

=== Cities ===
- Goodland (county seat)
- Kanorado

=== Unincorporated communities ===
- Caruso
- Edson†
- Ruleton

=== Townships ===
Sherman County is divided into thirteen townships. The city of Goodland is considered governmentally independent and is excluded from the census figures for the townships. Geographically, Goodland is located at the juncture of Voltaire, Itasca, and Logan Townships. In the following table, the population center is the largest city (or cities) included in that township's population total, if it is of a significant size.

Sources: 2000 U.S. Gazetteer from the U.S. Census Bureau.
Township	FIPS	Population center	Population	Population density /km^{2} (/sq mi)	Land area km^{2} (sq mi)	Water area km^{2} (sq mi)	Water %	Geographic coordinates
Grant	28150		115	0 (1)	355 (137)	0 (0)	0.02%	39°28′26″N 101°54′41″W
Iowa	34450		44	0 (0)	279 (108)	0 (0)	0%	39°15′27″N 101°29′38″W
Itasca	34600		321	4 (10)	87 (34)	0 (0)	0%	39°19′33″N 101°40′29″W
Lincoln	41175		95	1 (1)	186 (72)	0 (0)	0.03%	39°19′5″N 101°53′3″W
Llanos	41650		43	0 (1)	185 (71)	0 (0)	0%	39°28′31″N 101°28′29″W
Logan	42250		246	2 (5)	138 (53)	0 (0)	0%	39°19′15″N 101°46′55″W
McPherson	44025		52	0 (1)	174 (67)	0 (0)	0%	39°10′18″N 101°56′12″W
Shermanville	65175		51	0 (1)	185 (71)	0 (0)	0%	39°29′54″N 101°34′25″W
Smoky	65950		87	0 (1)	280 (108)	0 (0)	0.12%	39°11′48″N 101°46′11″W
Stateline	68150	Kanorado	344	2 (5)	165 (64)	0 (0)	0.03%	39°19′6″N 102°0′17″W
Union	72425		56	0 (1)	140 (54)	0 (0)	0%	39°20′25″N 101°27′24″W
Voltaire	74175		252	1 (2)	411 (159)	0 (0)	0%	39°27′12″N 101°43′4″W
Washington	75750		106	1 (2)	139 (54)	0 (0)	0%	39°20′0″N 101°32′59″W

== See also ==
Community information for Kansas

- Kansas locations by per capita income
- List of counties in Kansas
- List of townships in Kansas
- List of cities in Kansas
- List of unincorporated communities in Kansas
- List of ghost towns in Kansas
