= Bird City, Kansas =

City in Cheyenne County, Kansas

- City
- Location within Cheyenne County and Kansas

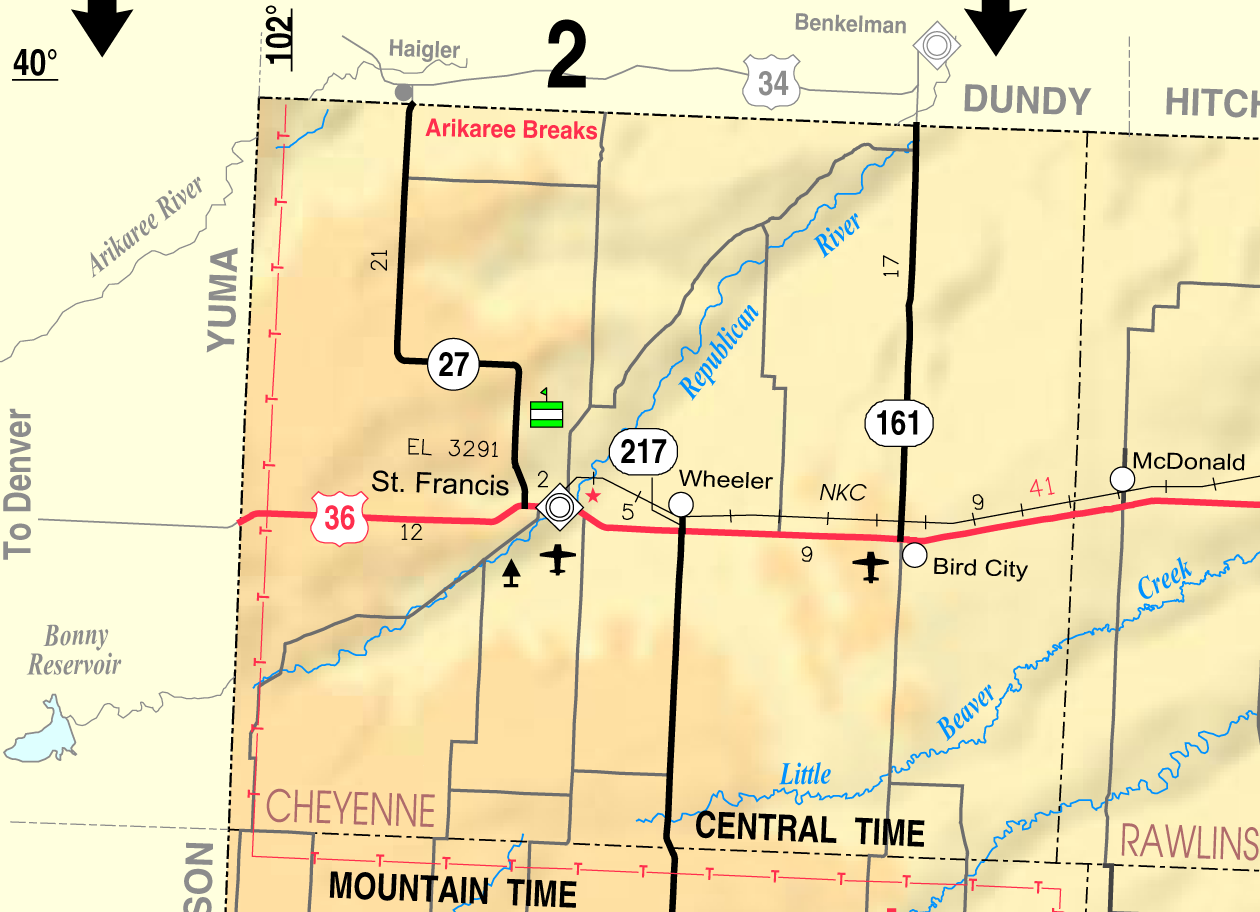
- KDOT map of Cheyenne County (legend)
- Coordinates: 39°45′10″N 101°31′58″W
- Country: United States
- State: Kansas
- County: Cheyenne
- Founded: 1885
- Incorporated: 1885
- Named for: Benjamin Bird

Area
  - Total: 2.27 sq mi (5.87 km^{2})
  - Land: 2.27 sq mi (5.87 km^{2})
  - Water: 0 sq mi (0.00 km^{2})
- Elevation: 3,468 ft (1,057 m)

Population (2020)
  - Total: 437
  - Density: 193/sq mi (74.4/km^{2})
- Time zone: UTC-6 (CST)
  - Summer (DST): UTC-5 (CDT)
- ZIP Code: 67731
- Area code: 785
- FIPS code: 20-06825
- GNIS ID: 2394172
- Website: birdcity.com

Bird City is a city in Cheyenne County, Kansas, United States. As of the 2020 census, the population of the city was 437.

== History ==
Bird City was founded in 1885. It was named for Benjamin Bird, a cattleman. The surrounding area was originally used predominately for livestock grazing.

Bird City was a station and shipping point on the Chicago, Burlington and Quincy Railroad.

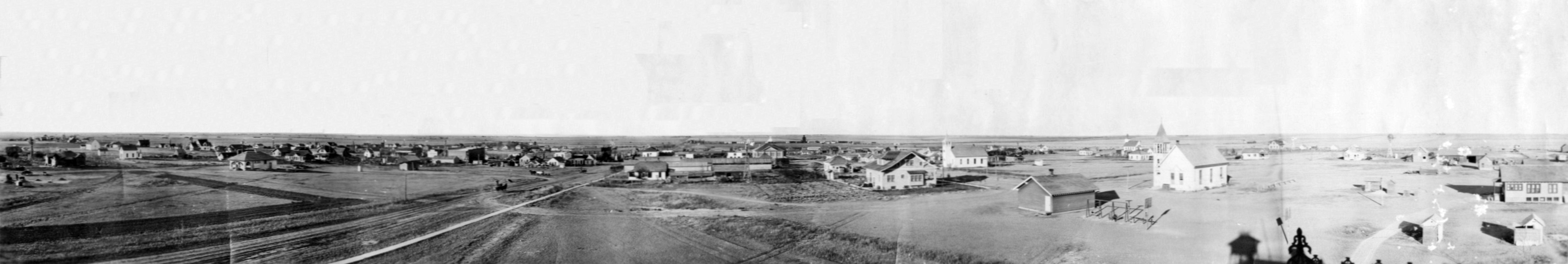
Bird City, circa 1900-1910

== Geography ==
According to the United States Census Bureau, the city has a total area of 2.23 square miles (5.78 km^{2}), all land.

=== Climate ===
According to the Köppen Climate Classification system, Bird City has a semi-arid climate, abbreviated "BSk" on climate maps.

== Demographics ==
Historical population
Census	Pop.	Note	%±
1890	145		—
1900	88		−39.3%
1910	190		115.9%
1920	489		157.4%
1930	740		51.3%
1940	694		−6.2%
1950	784		13.0%
1960	678		−13.5%
1970	671		−1.0%
1980	546		−18.6%
1990	467		−14.5%
2000	482		3.2%
2010	447		−7.3%
2020	437		−2.2%
U.S. Decennial Census

=== 2020 census ===
The 2020 United States census counted 437 people, 205 households, and 112 families in Bird City. The population density was 192.9 per square mile (74.5/km^{2}). There were 271 housing units at an average density of 119.6 per square mile (46.2/km^{2}). The racial makeup was 81.24% (355) white or European American (75.29% non-Hispanic white), 0.0% (0) black or African-American, 0.0% (0) Native American or Alaska Native, 0.46% (2) Asian, 0.0% (0) Pacific Islander or Native Hawaiian, 7.55% (33) from other races, and 10.76% (47) from two or more races. Hispanic or Latino of any race was 17.16% (75) of the population.

Of the 205 households, 23.4% had children under the age of 18; 44.4% were married couples living together; 29.8% had a female householder with no spouse or partner present. 40.5% of households consisted of individuals and 22.9% had someone living alone who was 65 years of age or older. The average household size was 2.0 and the average family size was 3.0. The percent of those with a bachelor's degree or higher was estimated to be 27.2% of the population.

23.6% of the population was under the age of 18, 4.8% from 18 to 24, 18.8% from 25 to 44, 28.1% from 45 to 64, and 24.7% who were 65 years of age or older. The median age was 47.8 years. For every 100 females, there were 96.0 males. For every 100 females ages 18 and older, there were 104.9 males.

The 2016–2020 5-year American Community Survey estimates show that the median household income was $38,125 (with a margin of error of +/- $14,601) and the median family income was $55,938 (+/- $8,435). Males had a median income of $32,031 (+/- $11,747) versus $31,164 (+/- $2,780) for females. The median income for those above 16 years old was $31,472 (+/- $3,424). Approximately, 5.8% of families and 9.7% of the population were below the poverty line, including 3.1% of those under the age of 18 and 24.3% of those ages 65 or over.

=== 2010 census ===
As of the census of 2010, there were 447 people, 211 households, and 118 families residing in the city. The population density was 200.4 inhabitants per square mile (77.4/km^{2}). There were 264 housing units at an average density of 118.4 per square mile (45.7/km^{2}). The racial makeup of the city was 96.2% White, 0.4% Native American, 0.9% from other races, and 2.5% from two or more races. Hispanic or Latino of any race were 15.0% of the population.

There were 211 households, of which 24.2% had children under the age of 18 living with them, 48.3% were married couples living together, 7.1% had a female householder with no husband present, 0.5% had a male householder with no wife present, and 44.1% were non-families. 40.8% of all households were made up of individuals, and 24.6% had someone living alone who was 65 years of age or older. The average household size was 2.12 and the average family size was 2.91.

The median age in the city was 47.4 years. 24.2% of residents were under the age of 18; 4% were between the ages of 18 and 24; 19.9% were from 25 to 44; 26.1% were from 45 to 64; and 25.7% were 65 years of age or older. The gender makeup of the city was 48.5% male and 51.5% female.

== Education ==
The community is served by Cheylin USD 103 public school district. School unification consolidated Bird City and McDonald schools in 1975 creating USD 103. The Cheylin High School mascot is Cheylin Cougars.

Bird City High School was closed through school unification. The Bird City High School mascot was Cardinals.
