= Beaver Creek (Sappa Creek tributary) =

River in Kansas and Nebraska, U.S.

- Location of the mouth within Nebraska Beaver Creek (Sappa Creek tributary) (the United States)

Location
- Country: United States
- States: Kansas, Nebraska
- Counties: Sherman, Cheyenne, Rawlins, Decatur, Red Willow, Furnas

Physical characteristics
- Source: Middle Beaver Creek
  - location: South-southwest of Burlington, Colorado
  - coordinates: 39°10′26″N 102°20′04″W
- 2nd source: South Beaver Creek
  - location: Southeast of Burlington, Colorado
  - coordinates: 39°14′21″N 102°04′17″W
- Source confluence
  - location: North-northeast of Goodland, Kansas
  - coordinates: 39°26′36″N 101°41′16″W
  - elevation: 3,501 ft (1,067 m)
- Mouth: Sappa Creek
  - location: West of Orleans, Nebraska
  - coordinates: 40°07′16″N 99°38′36″W
  - elevation: 2,018 ft (615 m)

Basin features
- Progression: Beaver Creek → Sappa Creek → Republican River → Kansas River → Missouri River → Mississippi River → Gulf of Mexico
- Tributaries
  - left: Little Beaver Creek

Beaver Creek is a river in the states of Kansas and Nebraska. It begins north-northeast of Goodland, Kansas and flows into Sappa Creek West of Orleans, Nebraska.

== History ==
On June 28, 1989, roughly 9 inches (23 cm) of rain fell in Sherman and Cheyenne counties in Kansas. KDOT had to close a 0.5-mile (0.80 km) section of K-117 by Herndon due to high water from the Beaver River flooding.
