= Wano Township, Kansas =

Wano Township
- Township
- Location in Cheyenne County
- Coordinates: 39°41′25″N 101°48′47″W
- Country: United States
- State: Kansas
- County: Cheyenne

Area
  - Total: 361.82 sq mi (937.12 km^{2})
  - Land: 361.64 sq mi (936.64 km^{2})
  - Water: 0.19 sq mi (0.48 km^{2}) 0.05%
- Elevation: 3,481 ft (1,061 m)

Population (2020)
  - Total: 1,731
  - Density: 4.787/sq mi (1.848/km^{2})
- GNIS feature ID: 0485198

Wano Township is a township in Cheyenne County, Kansas, United States. As of the 2020 census, its population was 1,731.

== Geography ==
Wano Township covers an area of 361.83 square miles (937.1 km^{2}) and contains one incorporated settlement, St. Francis (the county seat). According to the USGS, it contains eight cemeteries: Emanuel, Gar, Hope Valley, Lawn Ridge, Saint Francis, Saint Pauls, Salem and Salem Evangelical.

The streams of Cherry Creek, Drury Creek, Fish Creek, Sand Creek, Spring Creek and West Fork Sand Creek run through this township.

== History ==
A post office was opened at Lawnridge in 1885. The post office was discontinued in 1896.

== Transportation ==
Wano Township contains two airports or landing strips: Cheyenne County Municipal Airport and Saint Francis Municipal Airport.
