= Morgan Township, Kansas =

Township in Thomas County, Kansas, U.S.

Morgan Township
- Township
- Location within Thomas County
- Coordinates: 39.343788°N 101.101612°W
- Country: United States
- State: Kansas
- County: Thomas

Government
  - Trustee: Larry Heier

Area
  - Total: 104.247 sq mi (270.00 km^{2})
  - Land: 104.243 sq mi (269.99 km^{2})
  - Water: 0.004 sq mi (0.010 km^{2}) 0.004%

Population (2020)
  - Total: 618
  - Density: 5.93/sq mi (2.29/km^{2})
- Time zone: UTC-6 (CST)
  - Summer (DST): UTC-5 (CDT)
- Area code: 785
- GNIS feature ID: 471193

Morgan Township is a township in Thomas County, Kansas, United States. As of the 2020 census, its population was 618.

== Geography ==
Morgan Township covers an area of 104.247 square miles (270.00 km^{2}), 0.004% of it water. The city of Colby and its exclaves are completely surrounded by the township, but are governmentally independent from it.

=== Adjacent townships ===
Rovohl Township, Thomas County
Barrett Township, Thomas County	northwest	north	northeast	Lacey Township, Thomas County
East Hale Township, Thomas County	west	self	east	North Randall Township, Thomas County
Kingery Township, Thomas County	southwest	south
Summers Township, Thomas County

== Transportation ==
Colby Municipal Airport, which serves the city of Colby, lies in the township.

=== Major highways ===
- I-70
- I-70 BS
- US-24
- K-25

== Demographics ==
As of the 2020 census, the township had a population of 618, giving a population density of 5.93 people per square mile (2.29 people/km^{2}). The racial makeup of the township was 94.0% White, 0.2% Asian, 0.2% Black or African American, 0.6% from some other race, and 5.0% from two or more races. Hispanics or Latinos of any race were 4.0% of the population.

The 2020–2024 American Community Survey estimated that the township contained 253 households and 253 housing units.
