= Winona Township, Kansas =

Township in Logan County, Kansas, U.S.

Winona Township
- Township
- Location in Logan County
- Coordinates: 39.048358°N 101.229971°W
- Country: United States
- State: Kansas
- County: Logan

Area
  - Total: 107.112 sq mi (277.42 km^{2})
  - Land: 107.112 sq mi (277.42 km^{2})
  - Water: 0 sq mi (0 km^{2}) 0%

Population (2020)
  - Total: 254
  - Density: 2.37/sq mi (0.916/km^{2})
- Time zone: UTC-6 (CST)
  - Summer (DST): UTC-5 (CDT)
- Area code: 785

Winona Township is a township in Logan County, Kansas, United States. As of the 2020 census, its population was 254.

== Geography ==
Winona Township covers an area of 107.112 square miles (277.42 square kilometers).

=== Communities ===
- Winona
- Page City

=== Adjacent townships ===
- Kingery Township, Thomas County (north)
- Summers Township, Thomas County (northeast)
- Monument Township, Logan County (east)
- Logansport Township, Logan County (southeast)
- Russell Springs Township, Logan County (south)
- Western Township, Logan County (southwest)
- McAllaster Township, Logan County (west)

=== Major highways ===
- US-40
- K-25
