= Rovohl Township, Kansas =

Township in Thomas County, Kansas, U.S.

Rovohl Township
- Township
- Location within Thomas County
- Coordinates: 39.503373°N 101.066972°W
- Country: United States
- State: Kansas
- County: Thomas

Government
  - Trustee: John C. Schroeder

Area
  - Total: 107.173 sq mi (277.58 km^{2})
  - Land: 107.17 sq mi (277.6 km^{2})
  - Water: 0.003 sq mi (0.0078 km^{2}) 0.003%

Population (2020)
  - Total: 129
  - Density: 1.20/sq mi (0.465/km^{2})
- Time zone: UTC-6 (CST)
  - Summer (DST): UTC-5 (CDT)
- Area code: 785
- GNIS feature ID: 471194

Rovohl Township is a township in Thomas County, Kansas, United States. As of the 2020 census, its population was 129.

== Geography ==
Rovolh Township covers an area of 107.173 square miles (277.58 km^{2}), 0.003% of it water.

=== Adjacent townships ===
Center Township, Rawlins County
		north	northeast	Herl Township, Rawlins County
Barrett Township, Thomas County	west	self	east	Wendell Township, Thomas County
East Hale Township, Thomas County	southwest	south	southeast	Lacey Township, Thomas County
Morgan Township, Thomas County

== Transportation ==
=== Major highways ===
- K-25

== Demographics ==
As of the 2020 census, the township had a population of 129, giving a population density of 1.20 people per square mile (0.46 people/km^{2}). The racial makeup of the township was 96.9% White, 0.8% from some other race, and 2.3% from two or more races. Hispanics or Latinos of any race were 1.6% of the population.

The 2020–2024 American Community Survey estimated that the township contained 53 households and 57 housing units.
