= Oakley Township, Kansas =

Township in Logan County, Kansas, U.S.

Oakley Township
- Township
- Location in Logan County
- Coordinates: 39.030987°N 100.884089°W
- Country: United States
- State: Kansas
- County: Logan

Area
  - Total: 107.373 sq mi (278.09 km^{2})
  - Land: 107.367 sq mi (278.08 km^{2})
  - Water: 0.006 sq mi (0.016 km^{2}) 0.01%

Population (2020)
  - Total: 2,173
  - Density: 20.24/sq mi (7.814/km^{2})
- Time zone: UTC-6 (CST)
  - Summer (DST): UTC-5 (CDT)
- Area code: 785

Oakley Township is a township in Logan County, Kansas, United States. As of the 2020 census, its population was 2,173.

== Geography ==
Oakley Township covers an area of 107.373 square miles (278.09 square kilometers).

=== Communities ===
- Oakley (county seat)

=== Adjacent townships ===
- South Randall Township, Thomas County (north)
- Grinnell Township, Gove County (east)
- Gaeland Township, Gove County (southeast)
- Elkader Township, Logan County (south)
- Logansport Township, Logan County (southwest)
- Monument Township, Logan County (west)
- Summers Township, Thomas County (northwest)

=== Major highways ===
- I-70
- US-40
- US-83
