= Sheridan, Logan County, Kansas =

Ghost town in Logan County, Kansas

Sheridan, Kansas
- Ghost town
- Location within Kansas Location within the United States
- Coordinates: 39°01′25″N 101°21′47″W
- Country: United States
- State: Kansas
- County: Logan
- Founded: 1868
- Abandoned: 1870
- Named for: Gen. Philip Sheridan
- Elevation: 3,113 ft (949 m)

Population
  - Total: 0

Sheridan is a ghost town in Logan County, Kansas, United States. Founded in 1868 at the western terminus of an important railroad line under construction, it served as a regional center of trade and departure point to the Santa Fe Trail to the south. In 1870, the local population abandoned the settlement due to the extension of the railroad west to Kit Carson, Colorado. During its brief existence, Sheridan earned a reputation for violence and lawlessness characteristic of the American frontier.

== History ==
An end-of-tracks town was founded in the summer of 1868 ahead of the construction of the Union Pacific Railroad Eastern Division at a site 20 miles (32 km) southwest of Monument, Kansas. Within two weeks, the settlement included 65 businesses and a population of 200. Its inhabitants initially named it “Phil Sheridan” in honor of U.S. Army Gen. Philip Sheridan. The name was then shortened to just “Sheridan”. Once rail construction reached the new town, it became a railhead for westbound freight to the Santa Fe Trail via a 120-mile (190 km) wagon road to Fort Lyon, Colorado.

Rail construction stopped at Sheridan in August 1868 and would not resume for a year pending additional funding from the U.S. Congress. In the interim, the town experienced an economic boom, becoming an area center of trade and swelling to a population of 2,000. It became a base of operations for buffalo hunters and wholesale traders in hides, furs, and wool. Merchandising firms and outfitters maintained warehouses along the tracks, and freight companies supplied wagon trains bound for New Mexico Territory. Sheridan also became a center of vice, home to numerous saloons and brothels. As was typical of remote frontier towns, violent crime was rampant. The settlement averaged four violent deaths per month, and hangings were common.

In March 1869, the railroad changed its name to the Kansas Pacific Railway, and westward construction resumed the following autumn. In March 1870, the railroad reached Kit Carson, Colorado and made it the new railhead. The population of Sheridan followed, dismantling the town’s buildings and relocating them to Kit Carson on flatcars. A new wagon road opened from Kit Carson to the Santa Fe Trail, leaving the site of Sheridan abandoned.

== Geography ==
Sheridan was located at 39°01′25″N 101°21′47″W (39.0236193 , -101.3629391) at an elevation of 3,113 feet (949 m). This site is on the North Fork of the Smoky Hill River, north of U.S. Route 40, approximately 1 mile (1.6 km) northeast of present-day McAllaster. It is in northwestern Logan County in the High Plains region of the Great Plains.

The town sat on the side of a ravine near two buttes named Hurlburt and Lawrence, later renamed the Consolation Points. Situated at the foot of the buttes was a water-filled depression called Lake Como.

== Notable people ==
Notable individuals who lived in Sheridan include:

- Buffalo Bill Cody, bison hunter, showman
