= Russell Springs Township, Logan County, Kansas =

Township in Logan County, Kansas, U.S.

Russell Springs Township
- Township
- Location in Logan County
- Coordinates: 38.870328°N 101.261181°W
- Country: United States
- State: Kansas
- County: Logan

Area
  - Total: 107.652 sq mi (278.82 km^{2})
  - Land: 107.625 sq mi (278.75 km^{2})
  - Water: 0.027 sq mi (0.070 km^{2}) 0.03%

Population (2020)
  - Total: 58
  - Density: 0.54/sq mi (0.21/km^{2})
- Time zone: UTC-6 (CST)
  - Summer (DST): UTC-5 (CDT)
- Area code: 785

Russell Springs Township is a township in Logan County, Kansas, United States. As of the 2020 census, its population was 58.

== Geography ==
Russell Springs Township covers an area of 107.652 square miles (278.82 square kilometers).

=== Communities ===
- Russell Springs

=== Adjacent townships ===
- Winona Township, Logan County (north)
- Monument Township, Logan County (northeast)
- Logansport Township, Logan County (east)
- Paxton Township, Logan County (southeast)
- Augustine Township, Logan County (southwest)
- Western Township, Logan County (west)
- McAllaster Township, Logan County (northwest)

=== Major highways ===
- K-25
