= Schmoll =

Schmoll can refer to:

== People ==
- Betty Schmoll (1936–2015), American nurse
- George Schmoll (1870–1942), New Zealand cricketer
- Hazel Schmoll (1890–1990), American botanist
- Steve Schmoll (born 1980), American baseball pitcher

== Other ==
- 6295 Schmoll, an asteroid
- Schmoll, the main nickname of French singer Eddy Mitchell
- Schmoll's milkvetch, a plant (Astragalus schmolliae)

== See also ==
- Peter Schmoll und seine Nachbarn (Peter Schmoll and his Neighbours), an opera by Carl Maria von Weber
