= Monument Township, Kansas =

Township in Logan County, Kansas, U.S.

Monument Township
- Township
- Location in Logan County
- Coordinates: 39.046742°N 101.063229°W
- Country: United States
- State: Kansas
- County: Logan

Area
  - Total: 106.796 sq mi (276.60 km^{2})
  - Land: 106.796 sq mi (276.60 km^{2})
  - Water: 0 sq mi (0 km^{2}) 0%

Population (2020)
  - Total: 127
  - Density: 1.19/sq mi (0.459/km^{2})
- Time zone: UTC-6 (CST)
  - Summer (DST): UTC-5 (CDT)
- Area code: 785

Monument Township is a township in Logan County, Kansas, United States. As of the 2020 census, its population was 127.

== Geography ==
Monument Township covers an area of 106.796 square miles (276.60 square kilometers).

=== Communities ===
- Monument

=== Adjacent townships ===
- Summers Township, Thomas County (north)
- Oakley Township, Logan County (east)
- Elkader Township, Logan County (southeast)
- Logansport Township, Logan County (south)
- Russell Springs Township, Logan County (southwest)
- Winona Township, Logan County (west)

=== Major highways ===
- US-40
- K-25
