= Augustine Township, Kansas =

Township in Logan County, Kansas, U.S.

Augustine Township
- Township
- Location in Logan County
- Coordinates: 38.744527°N 101.372727°W
- Country: United States
- State: Kansas
- County: Logan

Area
  - Total: 72.176 sq mi (186.93 km^{2})
  - Land: 72.176 sq mi (186.93 km^{2})
  - Water: 0 sq mi (0 km^{2}) 0%

Population (2020)
  - Total: 15
  - Density: 0.21/sq mi (0.080/km^{2})
- Time zone: UTC-6 (CST)
  - Summer (DST): UTC-5 (CDT)
- Area code: 785

Augustine Township is a township in Logan County, Kansas, United States. As of the 2020 census, its population was 15.

== Geography ==
Augustine Township covers an area of 72.176 square miles (186.93 square kilometers).

=== Adjacent townships ===
- Western Township, Logan County (north)
- Russell Springs Township, Logan County (northeast)
- Paxton Township, Logan County (east)
- Leoti Township, Wichita County (south)
- Harrison Township, Wallace County (west)

=== Major highways ===
- K-25
