= Western Township, Kansas =

Township in Logan County, Kansas, U.S.

Western Township
- Township
- Location in Logan County
- Coordinates: 38.875586°N 101.398879°W
- Country: United States
- State: Kansas
- County: Logan

Area
  - Total: 107.634 sq mi (278.77 km^{2})
  - Land: 107.593 sq mi (278.66 km^{2})
  - Water: 0.041 sq mi (0.11 km^{2}) 0.04%

Population (2020)
  - Total: 43
  - Density: 0.40/sq mi (0.15/km^{2})
- Time zone: UTC-6 (CST)
  - Summer (DST): UTC-5 (CDT)
- Area code: 785

Western Township is a township in Logan County, Kansas, United States. As of the 2020 census, its population was 43.

== Geography ==
Western Township covers an area of 107.652 square miles (278.77 square kilometers).

=== Adjacent townships ===
- McAllaster Township, Logan County (north)
- Winona Township, Logan County (northeast)
- Russell Springs Township, Logan County (east)
- Augustine Township, Logan County (south)
- Harrison Township, Wallace County (southwest)
- Wallace Township, Wallace County (northwest)

=== Major highways ===
- US-40
- K-25
