= Kuhrt Ranch =

- U.S. National Register of Historic Places
- U.S. Historic district
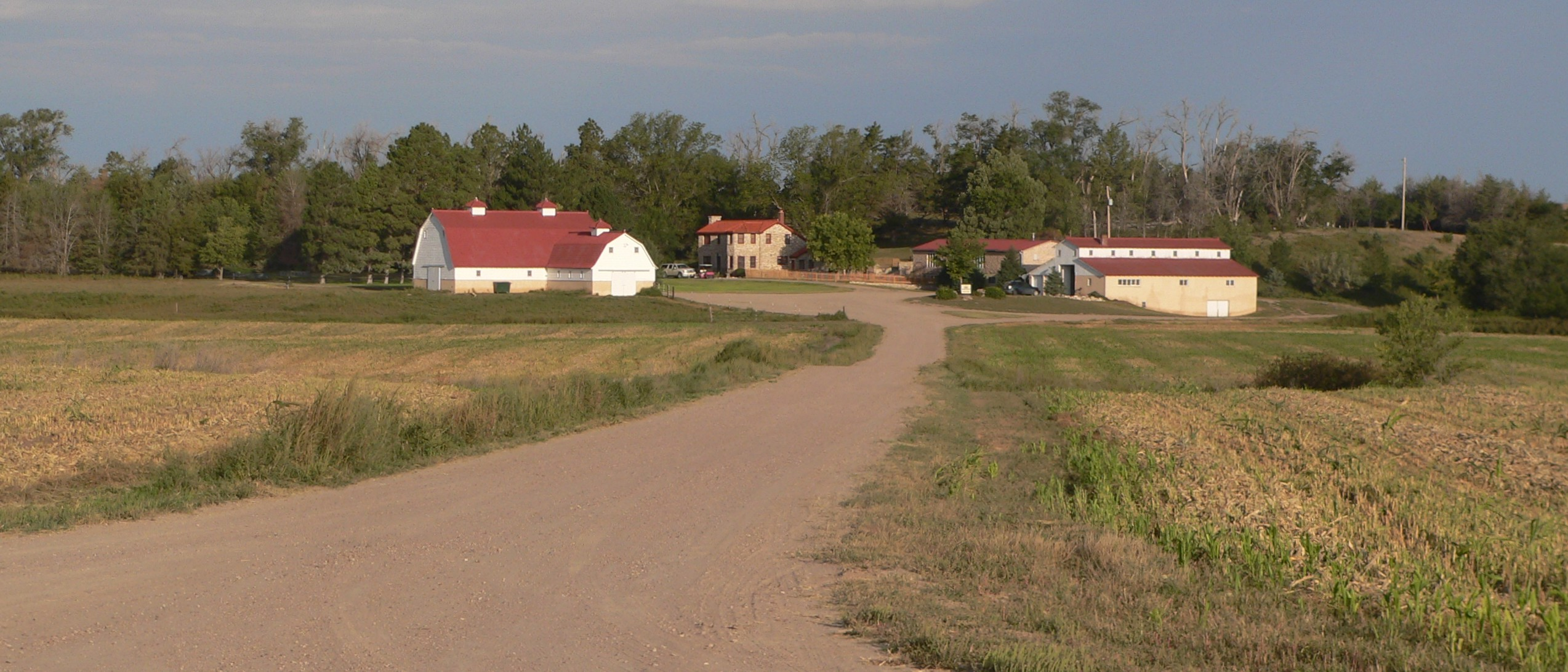

- Location within Kansas Location within the United States
- Location: 2725 Road 77, Shermanville Township, Sherman County, Kansas, near Edson, Kansas
- Coordinates: 39.5172°N 101.5676°W
- Area: 320 acres (1.3 km^{2})
- Built: c. 1907, 1934
- Built by: Byrnes, Ben H.; et al.
- Architectural style: Spanish Revival, other
- NRHP reference No.: 01000408
- Added to NRHP: April 25, 2001

The Kuhrt Ranch in Shermanville Township in Sherman County, Kansas, near Edson, Kansas, dates from 1907. It was listed on the National Register of Historic Places in 2001.

Its main house was built around 1907 and was modified in 1934. It is termed to be Spanish Colonial-inspired.

The listing included three contributing buildings and a contributing structure. Another contributing building is a barn built c. 1922, modified in 1933. The third is a machine shop dating from c. 1933. The contributing structure is an arched bridge built by Paul Kuhrt from plywood and metal, then poured concrete.

It has been stated that the ranch started in the 1880s as a one-room sod house which established Shermanville. "Even then, travelers found it a welcome respite and shelter on their journey. The property was purchased by William and Pauline Kuhrt in 1891, and renamed the Kuhrt Ranch, a landmark so noteworthy that it is today listed on the National Register of Historic Places."

Stone from the ranch's quarry was used to build a number of buildings in nearby Bird City, including the city hall and city park, both built as Works Progress Administration projects during the New Deal.

As of 2022 the property is listed as a "working farm and ranch resort" which is available for pheasant hunting and for turkey hunting. Economic development and members of the Kansas State University local extension have envisioned the ranch as a key example of agritourism in the area.
