= Elkader Township, Kansas =

Township in Logan County, Kansas, U.S.

Elkader Township
- Township
- Location in Logan County
- Coordinates: 38.887042°N 100.880636°W
- Country: United States
- State: Kansas
- County: Logan

Area
  - Total: 107.516 sq mi (278.47 km^{2})
  - Land: 107.507 sq mi (278.44 km^{2})
  - Water: 0.009 sq mi (0.023 km^{2}) 0.01%

Population (2020)
  - Total: 15
  - Density: 0.14/sq mi (0.054/km^{2})
- Time zone: UTC-6 (CST)
  - Summer (DST): UTC-5 (CDT)
- Area code: 785

Elkader Township is a township in Logan County, Kansas, United States. As of the 2020 census, its population was 15.

== Geography ==
Elkader Township covers an area of 107.516 square miles (287.47 square kilometers).

=== Adjacent townships ===
- Oakley Township, Logan County (north)
- Gaeland Township, Gove County (northeast)
- Lewis Township, Gove County (southeast)
- Lees Township, Logan County (south)
- Logansport Township, Logan County (west)
- Monument Township, Logan County (northwest)

=== Major highways ===
- US-83
