= Logan County, Kansas =

County in Kansas, United States

- County
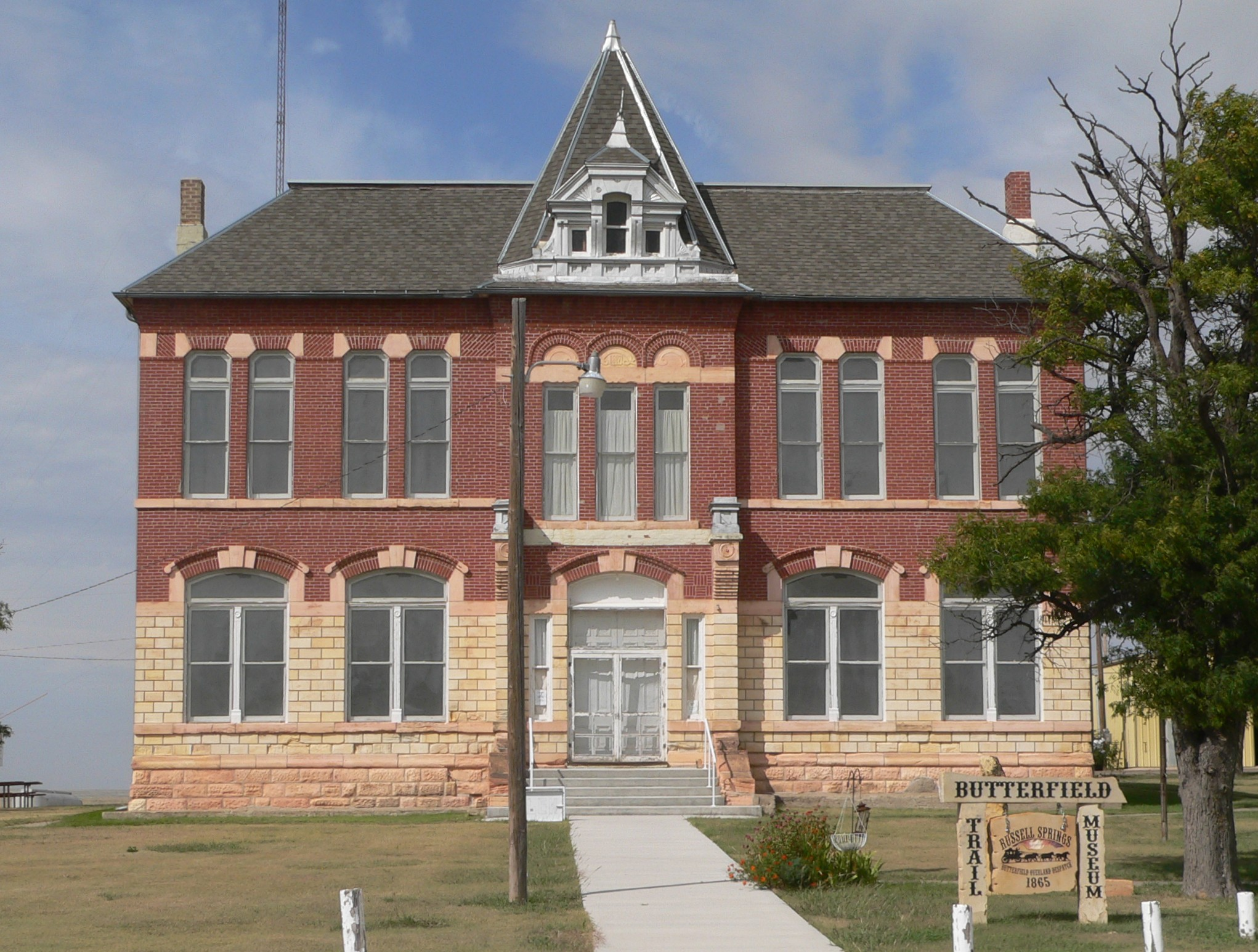
- Butterfield Trail Museum, formerly the Logan County Courthouse, in Russell Springs (2014)

- Location within the U.S. state of Kansas
- Country: United States
- State: Kansas
- Founded: February 24, 1887
- Named for: John A. Logan
- Seat: Oakley
- Largest city: Oakley

Area
  - Total: 1,073 sq mi (2,780 km^{2})
  - Land: 1,073 sq mi (2,780 km^{2})
  - Water: 0.1 sq mi (0.26 km^{2}) 0.01%

Population (2020)
  - Total: 2,762
  - Estimate (2025): 2,661 ▼
  - Density: 2.6/sq mi (1.0/km^{2})
- Time zone: UTC−6 (Central)
  - Summer (DST): UTC−5 (CDT)
- Congressional district: 1st
- Website: cityofoakleyks.gov

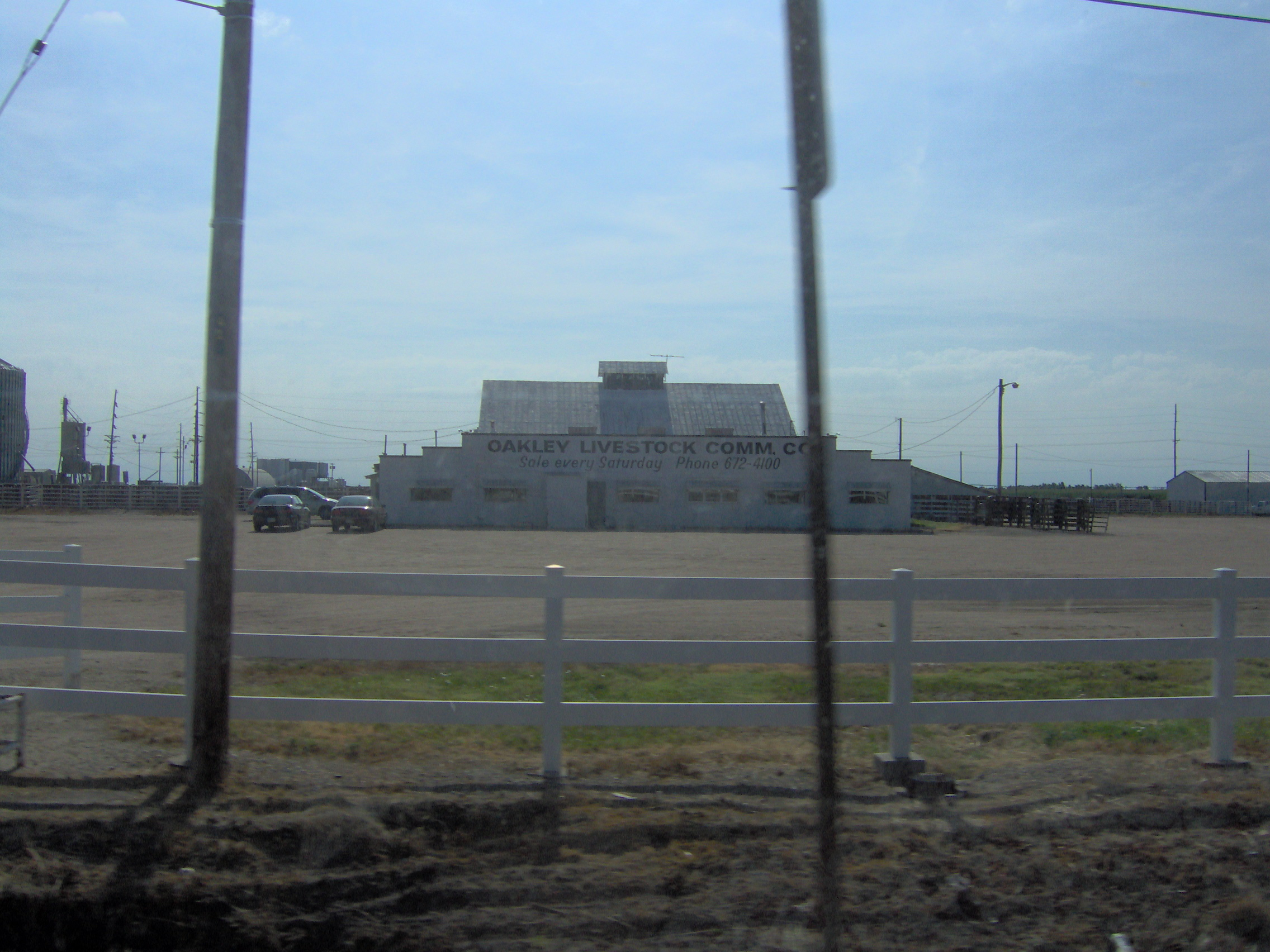
Agriculture, as represented by this stockyard on the edge of Oakley, is important in Logan County

Logan County is a county located in the U.S. state of Kansas. Its county seat and largest city is Oakley. As of the 2020 census, the county population was 2,762. The county was named for John Logan, a general during the American Civil War. One of the county's distinctive features is a mile-long stretch of Smoky Hill Chalk bluffs that tower 100 feet (30 m) high over the Smoky Hill River and are dubbed "Little Jerusalem" for resemblance to the ancient walled city. The formation is mostly on private land. In 2016, The Nature Conservancy purchased the property and the Little Jerusalem Badlands State Park opened to the public in October 2019.

== History ==
=== Early history ===
For many millennia, the Great Plains of North America was inhabited by nomadic Native Americans. From the 16th century to 18th century, the Kingdom of France claimed ownership of large parts of North America. In 1762, after the French and Indian War, France secretly ceded New France to Spain, per the Treaty of Fontainebleau.

=== 19th century ===
In 1802, Spain returned most of the land to France, but keeping title to about 7,500 square miles. In 1803, most of the land for modern day Kansas was acquired by the United States from France as part of the 828,000 square mile Louisiana Purchase for 2.83 cents per acre.

In 1854, the Kansas Territory was organized, then in 1861 Kansas became the 34th U.S. state. In 1887, Logan County was established.

Logan County was first created in 1871 as St. John County. St. John was formed from the area to the east of range 38 in what was then part of Wallace County. The Kansas State Legislature changed the name from St. John to Logan in 1885.

== Geography ==
According to the U.S. Census Bureau, the county has a total area of 1,073 square miles (2,780 km^{2}), of which 1,073 square miles (2,780 km^{2}) is land and 0.1 square miles (0.26 km^{2}) (0.01%) is water.

=== Major highways ===
- I-70
- US-40
- US-83
- K-25

=== Adjacent counties ===
- Thomas County (north)
- Gove County (east)
- Scott County (southeast)
- Wichita County (south)
- Wallace County (west/Mountain Time border)
- Sherman County (northwest/Mountain Time border)

== Demographics ==
Historical population
Census	Pop.	Note	%±
1890	3,384		—
1900	1,962		−42.0%
1910	4,240		116.1%
1920	3,223		−24.0%
1930	4,145		28.6%
1940	3,688		−11.0%
1950	4,206		14.0%
1960	4,036		−4.0%
1970	3,814		−5.5%
1980	3,478		−8.8%
1990	3,081		−11.4%
2000	3,046		−1.1%
2010	2,756		−9.5%
2020	2,762		0.2%
2025 (est.)	2,661	▼	−3.7%
U.S. Decennial Census; 1790-1960 1900-1990; 1990-2000 2010-2020

=== 2020 census ===
As of the 2020 census, the county had a population of 2,762. The median age was 40.1 years. 25.2% of residents were under the age of 18 and 20.6% of residents were 65 years of age or older. For every 100 females there were 101.5 males, and for every 100 females age 18 and over there were 100.9 males age 18 and over. 0.0% of residents lived in urban areas, while 100.0% lived in rural areas.

The racial makeup of the county was 91.0% White, 0.2% Black or African American, 0.0% American Indian and Alaska Native, 0.4% Asian, 0.1% Native Hawaiian and Pacific Islander, 3.1% from some other race, and 5.2% from two or more races. Hispanic or Latino residents of any race comprised 7.1% of the population.

There were 1,181 households in the county, of which 30.2% had children under the age of 18 living with them and 24.7% had a female householder with no spouse or partner present. About 32.4% of all households were made up of individuals and 15.4% had someone living alone who was 65 years of age or older.

There were 1,369 housing units, of which 13.7% were vacant. Among occupied housing units, 69.7% were owner-occupied and 30.3% were renter-occupied. The homeowner vacancy rate was 3.1% and the rental vacancy rate was 8.7%.

=== 2000 census ===
At the 2000 census, there were 3,046 people, 1,243 households and 856 families residing in the county. The population density was 3 per square mile (1.2/km^{2}). There were 1,423 housing units at an average density of 1 per square mile (0.39/km^{2}). The racial makeup of the county was 96.72% White, 0.59% Black or African American, 0.16% Native American, 0.20% Asian, 0.72% from other races, and 1.61% from two or more races. 1.64% of the population were Hispanic or Latino of any race.

There were 1,243 households, of which 29.50% had children under the age of 18 living with them, 59.30% were married couples living together, 6.30% had a female householder with no husband present, and 31.10% were non-families. 28.60% of all households were made up of individuals, and 14.80% had someone living alone who was 65 years of age or older. The average household size was 2.40 and the average family size was 2.98.

Age distribution was 25.40% under the age of 18, 7.20% from 18 to 24, 24.40% from 25 to 44, 22.30% from 45 to 64, and 20.70% who were 65 years of age or older. The median age was 41 years. For every 100 females there were 93.60 males. For every 100 females age 18 and over, there were 93.00 males.

The median household income was $32,131 and the median family income was $40,104. Males had a median income of $28,105 and females $19,609. The per capita income was $17,294. About 4.70% of families and 7.30% of the population were below the poverty line, including 7.80% of those under age 18 and 8.60% of those age 65 or over.

== Government ==
=== Presidential elections ===
Presidential election results

United States presidential election results for Logan County, Kansas
Year	Republican		Democratic		Third party(ies)	
Year	No.	%	No.	%	No.	%
1888	609	65.84%	283	30.59%	33	3.57%
1892	457	58.14%	0	0.00%	329	41.86%
1896	274	60.35%	175	38.55%	5	1.10%
1900	319	60.53%	176	33.40%	32	6.07%
1904	408	71.83%	117	20.60%	43	7.57%
1908	524	59.34%	308	34.88%	51	5.78%
1912	166	20.22%	259	31.55%	396	48.23%
1916	592	42.05%	709	50.36%	107	7.60%
1920	781	68.51%	312	27.37%	47	4.12%
1924	942	63.86%	286	19.39%	247	16.75%
1928	1,066	71.64%	405	27.22%	17	1.14%
1932	867	44.26%	1,025	52.32%	67	3.42%
1936	955	51.15%	908	48.63%	4	0.21%
1940	1,201	66.83%	584	32.50%	12	0.67%
1944	1,107	72.92%	406	26.75%	5	0.33%
1948	1,105	63.73%	579	33.39%	50	2.88%
1952	1,544	79.96%	369	19.11%	18	0.93%
1956	1,328	72.61%	493	26.95%	8	0.44%
1960	1,243	65.22%	651	34.16%	12	0.63%
1964	967	49.82%	957	49.30%	17	0.88%
1968	1,120	63.78%	411	23.41%	225	12.81%
1972	1,164	69.99%	428	25.74%	71	4.27%
1976	957	56.39%	694	40.90%	46	2.71%
1980	1,261	72.89%	358	20.69%	111	6.42%
1984	1,235	77.04%	331	20.65%	37	2.31%
1988	988	64.36%	503	32.77%	44	2.87%
1992	905	52.95%	355	20.77%	449	26.27%
1996	1,155	73.47%	296	18.83%	121	7.70%
2000	1,088	77.88%	231	16.54%	78	5.58%
2004	1,255	82.40%	248	16.28%	20	1.31%
2008	1,187	82.43%	225	15.63%	28	1.94%
2012	1,126	83.41%	197	14.59%	27	2.00%
2016	1,132	83.42%	149	10.98%	76	5.60%
2020	1,249	85.67%	186	12.76%	23	1.58%
2024	1,186	84.71%	183	13.07%	31	2.21%

Like all the High Plains, Logan County is overwhelmingly Republican. Only two Democrats have ever carried the county in a Presidential election: Woodrow Wilson in 1916 and Franklin D. Roosevelt in 1932. Since at least 1888 only three other Democrats have passed forty percent of the county's vote: Roosevelt in 1936, Lyndon Johnson in 1964 and Jimmy Carter in 1976. In fact, apart from Michael Dukakis in 1988 during an election held during the grip of a major Plains drought, no Democrat since 1980 has passed 21 percent of the county's vote.

=== Laws ===
Following amendment to the Kansas Constitution in 1986, the county remained a prohibition, or "dry", county until 2006, when voters approved the sale of alcoholic liquor by the individual drink without a food sales requirement.

== Education ==
=== Unified school districts ===
- Oakley USD 274
- Triplains USD 275

== Communities ==
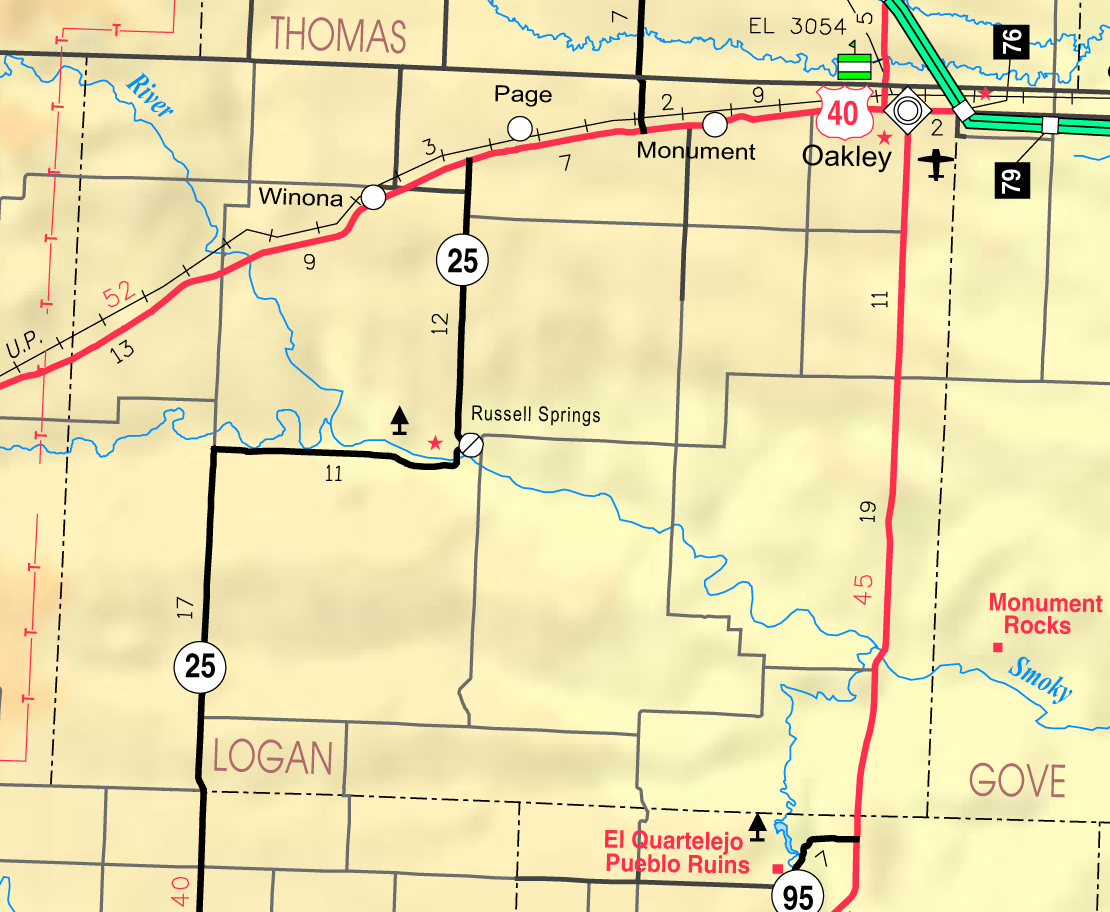
2005 map of Logan County (map legend)

List of townships / incorporated cities / unincorporated communities / extinct former communities within Logan County.
‡ means a community has portions in an adjacent county. † means a community is designated a Census-Designated Place (CDP) by the United States Census Bureau.

=== Cities ===
- Oakley‡ (county seat)
- Russell Springs
- Winona

=== Unincorporated communities ===
- Monument†
- Page City

=== Ghost towns ===
- McAllaster
- Sheridan

=== Townships ===
Logan County is divided into 11 townships. None of the cities within the county is considered "governmentally independent" and all figures for the townships include those of the cities.

In the following table, the population center is the largest city (or cities) included in that township's population total, if it is of a significant size.

Sources: 2000 U.S. Gazetteer from the U.S. Census Bureau.
Township	FIPS	Population center	Population	Population density /km^{2} (/sq mi)	Land area km^{2} (sq mi)	Water area km^{2} (sq mi)	Water %	Geographic coordinates
Augustine	03350		26	0 (0)	187 (72)	0 (0)	0%	38°44′14″N 101°21′15″W
Elkader	20225		15	0 (0)	278 (107)	0 (0)	0.01%	38°53′33″N 100°52′1″W
Lees	39200		17	0 (0)	185 (72)	0 (0)	0%	38°44′26″N 100°59′5″W
Logansport	42325		14	0 (0)	278 (107)	0 (0)	0.01%	38°51′29″N 101°4′9″W
McAllaster	43600		29	0 (0)	276 (106)	0 (0)	0.01%	39°2′58″N 101°22′4″W
Monument	48050		144	1 (1)	276 (107)	0 (0)	0%	39°4′17″N 101°2′42″W
Oakley	51850	Oakley	2,343	8 (22)	278 (107)	0 (0)	0.01%	39°6′43″N 100°51′32″W
Paxton	55025		24	0 (0)	186 (72)	0 (0)	0%	38°44′38″N 101°7′57″W
Russell Springs	61900		71	0 (1)	279 (108)	0 (0)	0.03%	38°53′16″N 101°12′15″W
Western	76900		44	0 (0)	279 (108)	0 (0)	0.04%	38°54′3″N 101°24′37″W
Winona	80100	Winona	319	1 (3)	277 (107)	0 (0)	0%	39°3′53″N 101°12′54″W

== See also ==
- Dry counties

Community information for Kansas

- Kansas locations by per capita income
- List of counties in Kansas
- List of townships in Kansas
- List of cities in Kansas
- List of unincorporated communities in Kansas
- List of ghost towns in Kansas
