= Russell Springs =

Russell Springs may refer to a place in the United States:

- Russell Springs, Kansas
- Russell Springs, Kentucky
