= Hazel Schmoll =

American botanist

- Born: Hazel Marguerite Schmoll; August 23, 1890; McAllaster, Kansas
- Died: January 31, 1990 (aged 99); Boulder, Colorado
- Education: University of Colorado Boulder; University of Chicago
- Scientific career
- Fields: Botany
- Author abbrev. (botany): Schmoll

Hazel Marguerite Schmoll (1890–1990) was an American botanist, and the first to conduct a systematic study of plant life in southwestern Colorado. She was also the first woman to earn a doctorate in botany from the University of Chicago. She was inducted into the Colorado Women's Hall of Fame in 1985.

== Early life and education ==
Hazel Marguerite Schmoll was born in a sod cabin in McAllaster, Kansas, on August 23, 1890, to William and Amelia Schmoll. The family moved to Ward, Colorado when she was two, where her father set up a livery stable. Schmoll showed an early interest in learning about wildflowers and spent much time roaming the area on horseback collecting specimens and picking berries. She described her childhood in Ward as ideal and retained a lifelong connection to the town, which shrank to less than a dozen residents in the 1940s before rebounding in the 1960s.

Schmoll attended Ward School through eighth grade, followed by the State Preparatory School in Boulder (an earlier incarnation of Boulder High School). She then went to the University of Colorado Boulder, from which she graduated in 1913 with a degree in biology. She taught for four years (1913–1917) at Vassar College, first in the biology department and then in the botany department. She was the first University of Colorado graduate to be hired by Vassar. Coming from the state that had been the first to grant women the vote, she was active in promoting the cause of women's suffrage on campus.

Discovering that she would need an advanced degree if she wished to continue teaching at Vassar, she enrolled at the University of Chicago to get a master's degree in botany. She studied mainly with botanist and ecological pioneer Henry Chandler Cowles and received her degree in 1919.

== Career ==
On returning to Colorado after her master's degree, Schmoll was hired to do some work for the Colorado Historical and Natural History Society at the Colorado State Museum, at first mainly mounting and cataloguing the botanical collections of Alice Eastwood and Ellsworth Bethel. The resulting herbarium is still considered one of the finest in the state. She went on to conduct the first systematic study of plant life in the southwestern part of the state, a project that would later feed into her doctoral dissertation. Another of her roles was to educate the public about plant life in the Rocky Mountains, and she served briefly (1920–21) as assistant curator for the State Bureau of Mines. In 1925, she was a leading lobbyist for efforts to pass legislation protecting the state flower, Aquilegia coerulea or blue columbine. A job which Schmoll had expected to be short-term ended up lasting until 1925, when Scholl left with the goal of pursuing a doctoral degree.

In late 1925, Schmoll traveled to Europe to visit botanical gardens and learn German. On returning, she enrolled at the University of Chicago for a Ph.D. in ecological botany, supporting herself with various jobs ranging from cleaning houses to rewriting a high school biology textbook. She also worked at the Field Museum of Natural History and served as a substitute professor at a local junior college. In 1932 she became the first woman to obtain a Ph.D. in botany from the University of Chicago. The subject of her dissertation was vegetation of the Chimney Rock area of southwestern Colorado. Schmoll was appointed as a board member of the Colorado Mountain Club, where she headed the lobbying effort to pass a bill that protected the lavender Columbine, the Colorado state flower.

During the Depression, Schmoll was unable to find a permanent job as a scientist. In 1938, she built Rangeview Ranch outside Ward, first as a children's camp and then as a guest ranch. It adjoined Rocky Mountain National Park, and Schmoll served as a nature guide for guests well into her seventies. Schmoll split her time between the ranch in the summers and a house in Ward the rest of the year.

Schmoll died on January 31, 1990, at the age of 99. Much of her property was donated for conservation purposes, although Rangeview Ranch was donated to the Christian Science Church for use as a retreat and conference center. In 2017, the ranch changed hands again and became the Rocky Mountain Ecodharma Retreat Center.

== Legacy and honors ==
In Schmoll's honor, the University of Colorado, Boulder, has established the Hazel Schmoll Research Fellowship in Colorado Botany emphasizing field botany and open to faculty, staff, and students.

A rare and imperiled species of milkvetch (also known as locoweed), Astragalus schmolliae or Schmoll's milkvetch, is named after Schmoll. It grows only on Chapin Mesa in Mesa Verde National Park, where it was first collected by Alice Eastwood in 1890 and where Schmoll and an assistant reported it for the second time in 1925. It was not described until 1945, at which time it was named after Schmoll.

Schmoll's extensive notebooks are in the archives of the Boulder Historical Society.
