= Logansport Township, Kansas =

Township in Logan County, Kansas, U.S.

Logansport Township
- Township
- Location in Logan County
- Coordinates: 38.851657°N 101.068492°W
- Country: United States
- State: Kansas
- County: Logan

Area
  - Total: 107.202 sq mi (277.65 km^{2})
  - Land: 107.187 sq mi (277.61 km^{2})
  - Water: 0.015 sq mi (0.039 km^{2}) 0.01%

Population (2020)
  - Total: 6
  - Density: 0.056/sq mi (0.022/km^{2})
- Time zone: UTC-6 (CST)
  - Summer (DST): UTC-5 (CDT)
- Area code: 785

Logansport Township is a township in Logan County, Kansas, United States. As of the 2020 census, its population was 6.

== Geography ==
Logansport Township covers an area of 107.202 square miles (277.65 square kilometers).

=== Adjacent townships ===
- Monument Township, Logan County (north)
- Oakley Township, Logan County (northeast)
- Elkader Township, Logan County (east)
- Lees Township, Logan County (southeast)
- Paxton Township, Logan County (southwest)
- Russell Springs Township, Logan County (west)
- Winona Township, Logan County (northwest)
