= Llanos Township, Kansas =

Township in Sherman County, Kansas, U.S.

Llanos Township
- Township
- Location in Sherman County
- Coordinates: 39°28′00″N 101°26′47″W
- Country: United States
- State: Kansas
- County: Sherman

Area
  - Total: 71.418 sq mi (184.97 km^{2})
  - Land: 71.418 sq mi (184.97 km^{2})
  - Water: 0 sq mi (0 km^{2}) 0%

Population (2020)
  - Total: 33
  - Density: 0.46/sq mi (0.18/km^{2})
- Time zone: UTC-7 (MST)
  - Summer (DST): UTC-6 (MDT)
- Area code: 785
- GNIS feature ID: 471185

Llanos Township is one of thirteen townships in Sherman County, Kansas, United States. As of the 2020 census, its population was 33.

== Geography ==
Llanos Township is located in the northeastern corner of the county.

It lies northwest of the county seat of Goodland. There are no communities in the township.

The intermittent Sappa and Beaver creeks flow through Llanos Township.

=== Adjacent townships ===
Bird City Township, Cheyenne County
		north	northeast	Rocewood Township, Rawlins County
Shermanville Township, Sherman County	west	self	east	Barrett Township, Thomas County
Washington Township, Sherman County	southwest	south	southeast	West Hale Township, Thomas County
Union Township, Sherman County

== Transportation ==
Only local roads are located in Llanos Township.

== Government ==
As an active township, Llanos Township is governed by a three-member board, composed of the township trustee, the township treasurer, and the township clerk. The trustee acts as the township executive.
