= Summers Township, Kansas =

Township in Thomas County, Kansas, U.S.

Summers Township
- Township
- Location within Thomas County
- Coordinates: 39.225868°N 101.046783°W
- Country: United States
- State: Kansas
- County: Thomas

Government
  - Trustee: Lynn Goossen

Area
  - Total: 144.172 sq mi (373.40 km^{2})
  - Land: 144.168 sq mi (373.39 km^{2})
  - Water: 0.004 sq mi (0.010 km^{2}) 0.003%

Population (2020)
  - Total: 160
  - Density: 1.1/sq mi (0.43/km^{2})
- Time zone: UTC-6 (CST)
  - Summer (DST): UTC-5 (CDT)
- Area code: 785
- GNIS feature ID: 471259

Summers Township is a township in Thomas County, Kansas, United States. As of the 2020 census, its population was 160.

== Geography ==
Summers Township covers an area of 144.172 square miles (373.40 km^{2}), 0.003% of it water.

=== Communities ===
- Mingo

=== Adjacent townships ===
Morgan Township, Thomas County
East Hale Township, Thomas County	northwest	north	northeast	North Randall Township, Thomas County
Kingery Township, Thomas County	west	self	east	South Randall Township, Thomas County
Winona Township, Logan County	southwest	south	southeast	Oakley Township, Logan County
Monument Township, Logan County

== Transportation ==
=== Major highways ===
- I-70
- K-25

== Demographics ==
As of the 2020 census, the township had a population of 160, giving a population density of 1.1 people per square mile (0.42 people/km^{2}). The racial makeup of the township was 96.3% White, 1.3% from some other race, and 2.5% from two or more races. Hispanics or Latinos of any race were 2.5% of the population.

The 2020–2024 American Community Survey estimated that the township contained 29 households and 29 housing units.
