= Washington Township, Sherman County, Kansas =

Township in Sherman County, Kansas, U.S.

Washington Township
- Township
- Location in Sherman County
- Coordinates: 39°19′30″N 101°33′17″W
- Country: United States
- State: Kansas
- County: Sherman

Area
  - Total: 53.695 sq mi (139.07 km^{2})
  - Land: 53.695 sq mi (139.07 km^{2})
  - Water: 0 sq mi (0 km^{2}) 0%

Population (2020)
  - Total: 72
  - Density: 1.3/sq mi (0.52/km^{2})
- Time zone: UTC-7 (MST)
  - Summer (DST): UTC-6 (MDT)
- Area code: 785
- GNIS feature ID: 471184

Washington Township is one of thirteen townships in Sherman County, Kansas, United States. As of the 2020 census, its population was 72.

== Geography ==
Washington Township is located in the eastern part of the county.

It lies east of the county seat of Goodland. There are no cities in the township, although the unincorporated community of Edson lies in the center of the township.

Several intermittent headwaters of Sappa Creek flow through Washington Township.

=== Adjacent townships ===
Shermanville Township, Sherman County
Voltaire Township, Sherman County	northwest	north	northeast	Llanos Township, Sherman County
Itasca Township, Sherman County	west	self	east	Union Township, Sherman County
Smoky Township, Sherman County	southwest	south
Iowa Township, Sherman County

== Transportation ==
Interstate 70 and U.S. Route 24 run concurrently east–west through Washington Township. The small K-253 connects Edson with the interstate. A railroad line also travels east–west through Washington Township, just north of the interstate.

== Government ==
As an active township, Washington Township is governed by a three-member board, composed of the township trustee, the township treasurer, and the township clerk. The trustee acts as the township executive.
