= Paxton Township, Kansas =

Township in Logan County, Kansas, U.S.

Paxton Township
- Township
- Location in Logan County
- Coordinates: 38.744218°N 101.150958°W
- Country: United States
- State: Kansas
- County: Logan

Area
  - Total: 71.75 sq mi (185.8 km^{2})
  - Land: 71.75 sq mi (185.8 km^{2})
  - Water: 0 sq mi (0 km^{2}) 0%

Population (2020)
  - Total: 33
  - Density: 0.46/sq mi (0.18/km^{2})
- Time zone: UTC-6 (CST)
  - Summer (DST): UTC-5 (CDT)
- Area code: 785

Paxton Township is a township in Logan County, Kansas, United States. As of the 2020 census, its population was 33.

== Geography ==
Paxton Township covers an area of 71.75 square miles (185.8 square kilometers).

=== Adjacent townships ===
- Logansport Township, Logan County (northeast)
- Lees Township, Logan County (east)
- Beaver Township, Scott County (southeast)
- Leoti Township, Wichita County (southwest)
- Augustine Township, Logan County (west)
- Russell Springs Township, Logan County (northwest)
