= Lees Township, Kansas =

Township in Logan County, Kansas, U.S.

Lees Township
- Township
- Location in Logan County
- Coordinates: 38.742765°N 100.929149°W
- Country: United States
- State: Kansas
- County: Logan

Area
  - Total: 71.467 sq mi (185.10 km^{2})
  - Land: 71.467 sq mi (185.10 km^{2})
  - Water: 0 sq mi (0 km^{2}) 0%

Population (2020)
  - Total: 13
  - Density: 0.18/sq mi (0.070/km^{2})
- Time zone: UTC-6 (CST)
  - Summer (DST): UTC-5 (CDT)
- Area code: 785

Lees Township is a township in Logan County, Kansas, United States. As of the 2020 census, its population was 13.

== Geography ==
Lees Township covers an area of 71.467 square miles (185.10 square kilometers).

=== Adjacent townships ===
- Elkader Township, Logan County (north)
- Lewis Township, Gove County (east)
- Michigan Township, Scott County (southeast)
- Beaver Township, Scott County (southwest)
- Paxton Township, Logan County (west)
- Logansport Township, Logan County (northwest)

=== Major highways ===
- US-83
