= Iowa Township, Sherman County, Kansas =

Township in Sherman County, Kansas, U.S.

Iowa Township
- Township
- Location in Sherman County
- Coordinates: 39°12′00″N 101°30′17″W
- Country: United States
- State: Kansas
- County: Sherman

Area
  - Total: 107.618 sq mi (278.73 km^{2})
  - Land: 107.618 sq mi (278.73 km^{2})
  - Water: 0 sq mi (0 km^{2}) 0%
- Elevation: 3,497 ft (1,066 m)

Population (2020)
  - Total: 27
  - Density: 0.25/sq mi (0.097/km^{2})
- Time zone: UTC-7 (MST)
  - Summer (DST): UTC-6 (MDT)
- ZIP Code: 67735
- Area code: 785
- GNIS feature ID: 0471251

Iowa Township is one of thirteen townships in Sherman County, Kansas, United States. As of the 2020 census, its population was 27.

== Geography ==
Iowa Township is located in the southeastern corner of the county.

It lies southeast of the county seat of Goodland. There are no communities in the township.

The north fork of the Smoky Hill River flows through the southwestern part of Iowa Township, and the source of the south fork of the Solomon River is located in the northeastern part of the township.

=== Adjacent townships ===
Washington Township, Sherman County
Itasca Township, Sherman County	northwest	north	northeast	Union Township, Sherman County
Smoky Township, Sherman County	west	self	east	Kingery Township, Thomas County
		south	southeast	McAllaster Township, Logan County
Wallace Township, Wallace County

== Transportation ==
Only local roads are located in Iowa Township.

== Government ==
Iowa Township is currently inactive; by Kansas law, when a township becomes inactive, its powers and duties revert to the county government.
