= McAllaster Township, Kansas =

Township in Logan County, Kansas, U.S.

McAllaster Township
- Township
- Location in Logan County
- Coordinates: 39.045806°N 101.403929°W
- Country: United States
- State: Kansas
- County: Logan

Area
  - Total: 106.421 sq mi (275.63 km^{2})
  - Land: 106.413 sq mi (275.61 km^{2})
  - Water: 0.008 sq mi (0.021 km^{2}) 0.01%

Population (2020)
  - Total: 25
  - Density: 0.23/sq mi (0.091/km^{2})
- Time zone: UTC-6 (CST)
  - Summer (DST): UTC-5 (CDT)
- Area code: 785

McAllaster Township is a township in Logan County, Kansas, United States. As of the 2020 census, its population was 25.

== Geography ==
McAllaster Township covers an area of 106.421 square miles (275.63 square kilometers).

=== Adjacent townships ===
- Kingery Township, Thomas County (northeast)
- Winona Township, Logan County (east)
- Russell Springs Township, Logan County (southeast)
- Western Township, Logan County (south)
- Wallace Township, Wallace County (west)
- Iowa Township, Sherman County (northwest)

=== Major highways ===
- US-40
