= Union Township, Sherman County, Kansas =

Township in Sherman County, Kansas, U.S.

Union Township
- Township
- Location in Sherman County
- Coordinates: 39°19′49″N 101°26′49″W
- Country: United States
- State: Kansas
- County: Sherman

Area
  - Total: 53.933 sq mi (139.69 km^{2})
  - Land: 53.933 sq mi (139.69 km^{2})
  - Water: 0 sq mi (0 km^{2}) 0%

Population (2020)
  - Total: 64
  - Density: 1.2/sq mi (0.46/km^{2})
- Time zone: UTC-7 (MST)
  - Summer (DST): UTC-6 (MDT)
- Area code: 785
- GNIS feature ID: 471186

Union Township is one of thirteen townships in Sherman County, Kansas, United States. As of the 2020 census, its population was 64.

== Geography ==
Union Township is located in the eastern part of the county.

It lies east of the county seat of Goodland. There are no communities in the township.

Several intermittent headwaters of Sappa Creek flow through Union Township.

=== Adjacent townships ===
Llanos Township, Sherman County
Shermanville Township, Sherman County	northwest	north
Washington Township, Sherman County	west	self	east	West Hale Township, Thomas County
		south	southeast	Kingery Township, Thomas County
Iowa Township, Sherman County

== Transportation ==
Interstate 70 and U.S. Route 24 run concurrently east–west through Union Township. A railroad line also travels east–west through Union Township, just north of the interstate.

== Government ==
Union Township is currently inactive; by Kansas law, when a township becomes inactive, its powers and duties revert to the county government.
