= West Hale Township, Kansas =

Township in Thomas County, Kansas, U.S.

West Hale Township
- Township
- Location within Thomas County
- Coordinates: 39.374104°N 101.33475°W
- Country: United States
- State: Kansas
- County: Thomas

Government
  - Trustee: Daman Glover

Area
  - Total: 53.94 sq mi (139.7 km^{2})
  - Land: 53.94 sq mi (139.7 km^{2})
  - Water: 0 sq mi (0 km^{2}) 0%

Population (2020)
  - Total: 361
  - Density: 6.69/sq mi (2.58/km^{2})
- Time zone: UTC-6 (CST)
  - Summer (DST): UTC-5 (CDT)
- Area code: 785
- GNIS feature ID: 471188

West Hale Township is a township in Thomas County, Kansas, United States. As of the 2020 census, its population was 361.

== Geography ==
West Hale Township covers an area of 53.94 square miles (139.7 km^{2}), all of it land.

=== Communities ===
- Brewster

=== Adjacent townships ===
Barrett Township, Thomas County
Llanos Township, Sherman County	northwest	north
Union Township, Sherman County	west	self	east	East Hale Township, Thomas County
		south
Kingery Township, Thomas County

== Transportation ==
=== Major highways ===
- I-70
- US-24

== Demographics ==
As of the 2020 census, the township had a population of 361, giving a population density of 6.69 people per square mile (2.58 people/km^{2}). The racial makeup of the township was 89.5% White, 0.8% Black or African American, 0.3% Asian, 4.4% from some other race, and 5.0% from two or more races. Hispanics or Latinos of any race were 7.5% of the population.

The 2020–2024 American Community Survey estimated that the township contained 188 households and 203 housing units.
