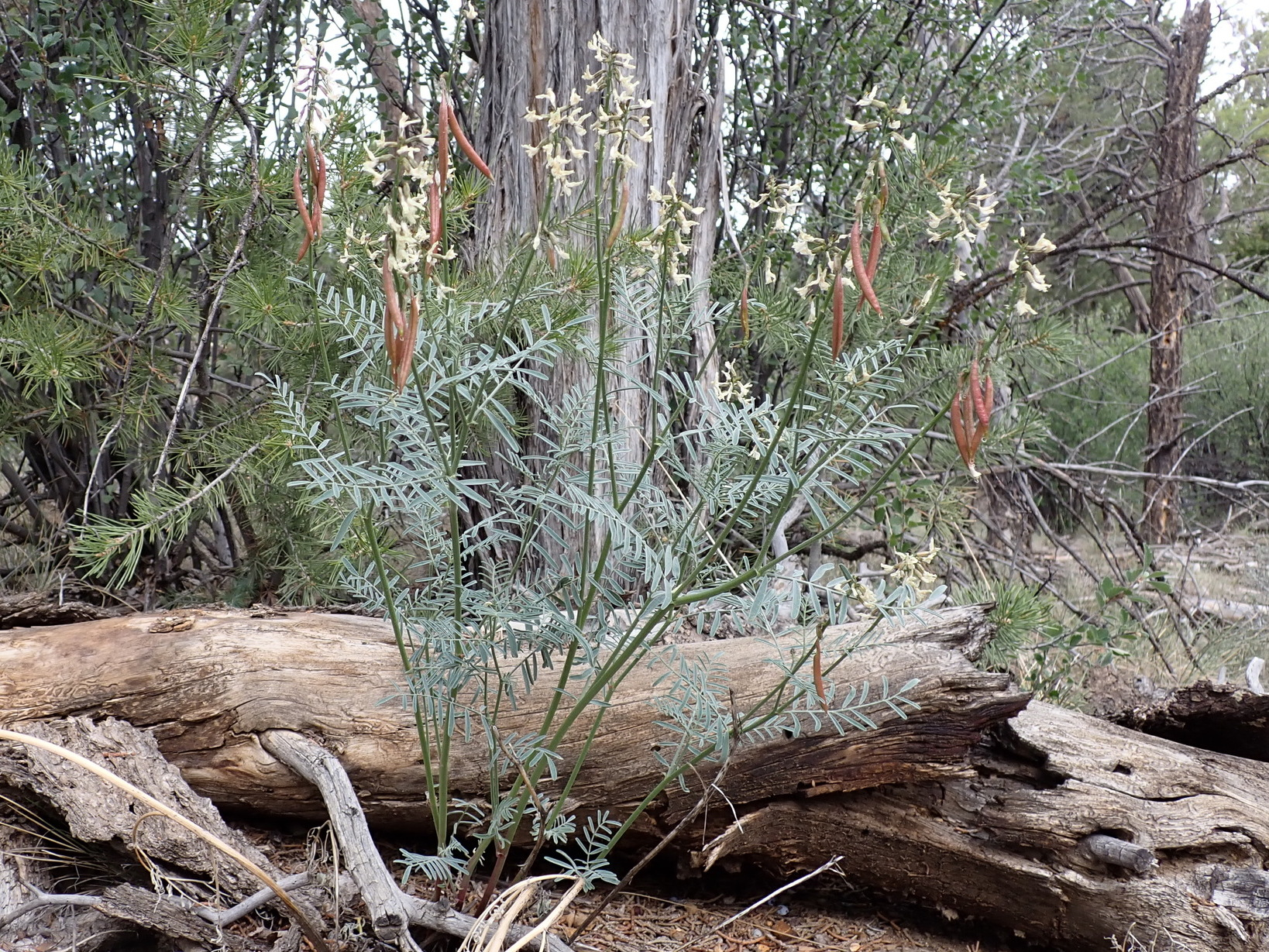

Conservation status
- Critically Imperiled (NatureServe)

Scientific classification
- Kingdom: Plantae
- Clade: Embryophytes
- Clade: Tracheophytes
- Clade: Angiosperms
- Clade: Eudicots
- Clade: Rosids
- Order: Fabales
- Family: Fabaceae
- Subfamily: Faboideae
- Genus: Astragalus
- Species: A. schmolliae

Binomial name
- Astragalus schmolliae Ced.Porter

= Astragalus schmolliae =

Species of legume

Astragalus schmolliae is a species of flowering plant in the legume family known by the common name Schmoll's milkvetch. It is endemic to Colorado in the United States, where it is limited to Montezuma County. It grows only on Chapin Mesa in Mesa Verde National Park.

This perennial herb grows 40–60 centimetres (16–24 in) tall. The leaves are each made up of linear leaflets. In May the plant blooms in cream- or yellowish-colored flowers. The fruit is a leathery legume pod.

Schmoll's milkvetch grows in mesa habitat. Its range is limited to Chapin Mesa, as it has not crossed to adjacent mesas. It is locally abundant in its range of 25 square kilometers. There are six occurrences, but two have not been relocated in many years. Threats to the species include invasive plants such as musk thistle and cheat grass. Fire is a threat, and a drought in 2002 also reduced the population.

This plant was first collected by Alice Eastwood in 1890. It is named after Colorado botanist Hazel Schmoll, who was the second to report it (in 1925).
