= Old Logan County Courthouse (Kansas) =

- U.S. National Register of Historic Places
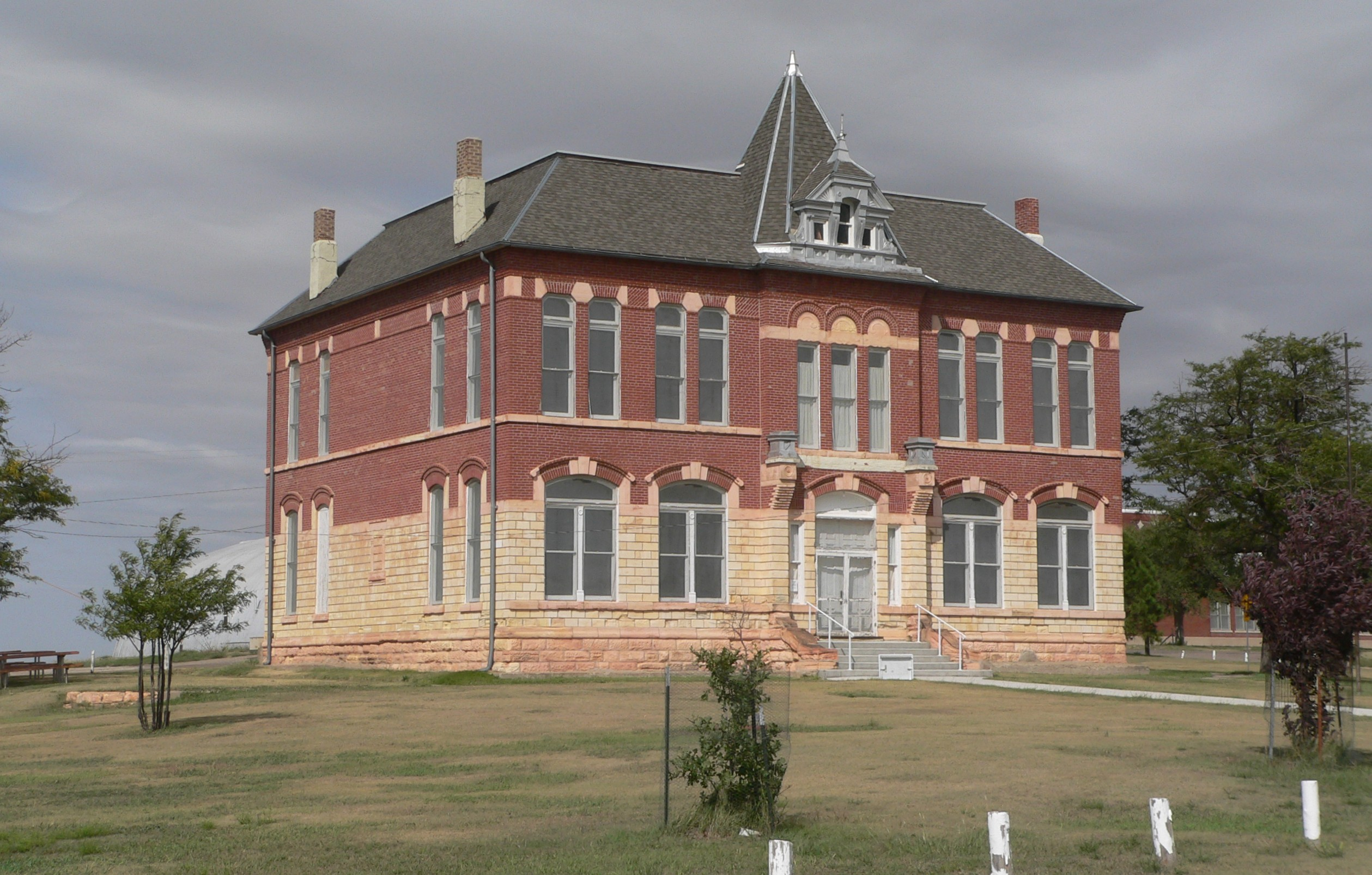
- Butterfield Trail Museum

- Location within Kansas Location within the United States
- Interactive map showing the location of Old Logan County Courthouse
- Location: Main St., Russell Springs, Kansas
- Coordinates: 38°54′44.5″N 101°10′49.75″W
- Built: 1887
- Built by: Kerns, George D.
- Architect: Meyer, Alfred
- Architectural style: Renaissance
- NRHP reference No.: 72000511
- Added to NRHP: February 23, 1972

The Old Logan County Courthouse on Main St. in Russell Springs, Kansas was built in 1887. It was designed by Alfred Meyer and built by local contractor George D. Kerns. It was listed on the National Register of Historic Places in 1972.

== Butterfield Trail Museum ==
The building is now home to the Butterfield Trail Museum. Exhibits focus on area pioneers, local history and natural history of the Great Plains, and the history of the Butterfield Overland Despatch stage line. The museum is open seasonally.
