= Kingery Township, Kansas =

Township in Thomas County, Kansas, U.S.

Kingery Township
- Township
- Location within Thomas County
- Coordinates: 39.221965°N 101.279587°W
- Country: United States
- State: Kansas
- County: Thomas

Government
  - Trustee: Jim Weed

Area
  - Total: 143.803 sq mi (372.45 km^{2})
  - Land: 143.803 sq mi (372.45 km^{2})
  - Water: 0 sq mi (0 km^{2}) 0%

Population (2020)
  - Total: 98
  - Density: 0.68/sq mi (0.26/km^{2})
- Time zone: UTC-6 (CST)
  - Summer (DST): UTC-5 (CDT)
- Area code: 785
- GNIS feature ID: 471254

Kingery Township is a township in Thomas County, Kansas, United States. As of the 2020 census, its population was 98.

== Geography ==
Kingery Township covers an area of 143.803 square miles (372.45 km^{2}), all of it land.

=== Adjacent townships ===
West Hale Township, Thomas County; East Hale Township, Thomas County
Union Township, Sherman County	northwest	north	northeast	Morgan Township, Thomas County
Iowa Township, Sherman County	west	self	east	Summers Township, Thomas County
McAllaster Township, Logan County	southwest	south
Winona Township, Logan County

== Demographics ==
As of the 2020 census, the township had a population of 98, giving a population density of 0.68 people per square mile (0.26 people/km^{2}). The racial makeup of the township was 98.0% White, and 2.0% from two or more races. Hispanics or Latinos of any race were 2.0% of the population.

The 2020–2024 American Community Survey estimated that the township contained 57 households and 57 housing units.
