= Shermanville Township, Kansas =

Township in Sherman County, Kansas, U.S.

Shermanville Township
- Township
- Location in Sherman County
- Coordinates: 39°28′55″N 101°33′28″W
- Country: United States
- State: Kansas
- County: Sherman

Area
  - Total: 71.461 sq mi (185.08 km^{2})
  - Land: 71.461 sq mi (185.08 km^{2})
  - Water: 0 sq mi (0 km^{2}) 0%

Population (2020)
  - Total: 20
  - Density: 0.28/sq mi (0.11/km^{2})
- Time zone: UTC-7 (MST)
  - Summer (DST): UTC-6 (MDT)
- Area code: 785
- GNIS feature ID: 471183

Shermanville Township is one of thirteen townships in Sherman County, Kansas, United States. As of the 2020 census, its population was 20.

== Geography ==
Shermanville Township is located in the northern part of the county.

It lies northeast of the county seat of Goodland. There are no communities in the township.

The intermittent Sappa and Beaver creeks flow through Shermanville Township.

=== Adjacent townships ===
Bird City Township, Cheyenne County
		north
Voltaire Township, Sherman County	west	self	east	Llanos Township, Sherman County
		south	southeast	Union Township, Sherman County
Washington Township, Sherman County

== Transportation ==
Only local roads are located in Shermanville Township.

== Government ==
Shermanville Township is currently inactive; by Kansas law, when a township becomes inactive, its powers and duties revert to the county government.
