= Gaeland Township, Kansas =

Gaeland Township
- Township
- Location in Gove County
- Coordinates: 38°56′21″N 100°43′55″W
- Country: United States
- State: Kansas
- County: Gove

Area
  - Total: 80.37 sq mi (208.15 km^{2})
  - Land: 80.37 sq mi (208.15 km^{2})
  - Water: 0 sq mi (0 km^{2}) 0%
- Elevation: 2,943 ft (897 m)

Population (2020)
  - Total: 52
  - Density: 0.65/sq mi (0.25/km^{2})
- GNIS feature ID: 0471376

Gaeland Township is a township in Gove County, Kansas, United States. As of the 2020 census, its population was 52.

== Geography ==
Gaeland Township covers an area of 80.37 square miles (208.2 km^{2}) and contains no incorporated settlements.

== Transportation ==
Gaeland Township contains two airports or landing strips: Evans Airport and Stevenson Airport.
