= Russell Springs, Kansas =

City in Logan County, Kansas

- City
- Location within Logan County and Kansas

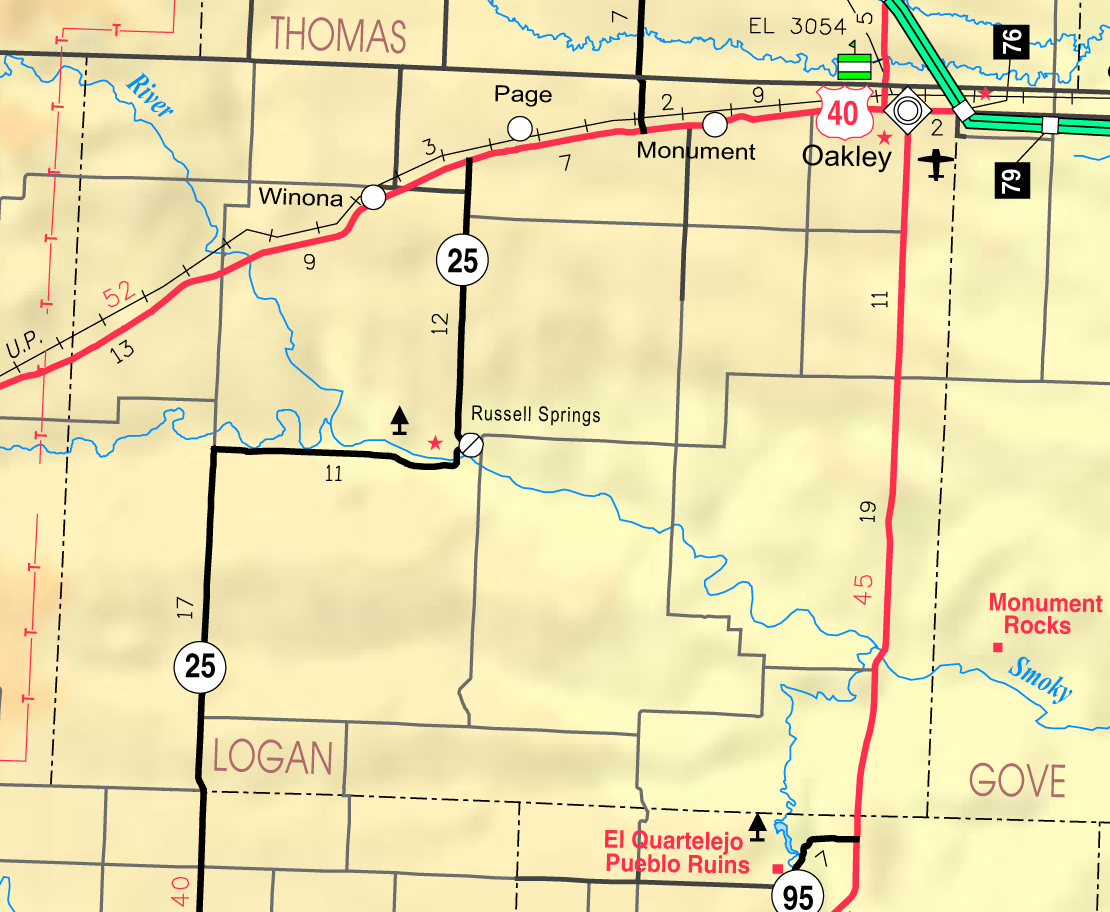
- KDOT map of Logan County (legend)
- Coordinates: 38°54′46″N 101°10′33″W
- Country: United States
- State: Kansas
- County: Logan
- Founded: 1865
- Incorporated: 1888
- Named for: Avra Russell & Springs

Area
  - Total: 0.71 sq mi (1.83 km^{2})
  - Land: 0.71 sq mi (1.83 km^{2})
  - Water: 0 sq mi (0.00 km^{2})
- Elevation: 2,904 ft (885 m)

Population (2020)
  - Total: 26
  - Density: 37/sq mi (14/km^{2})
- Time zone: UTC-6 (Central (CST))
  - Summer (DST): UTC-5 (CDT)
- ZIP Code: 67764
- Area code: 785
- FIPS code: 20-61875
- GNIS ID: 2396457

Russell Springs is a city in Logan County, Kansas, United States. As of the 2020 census, the population of the city was 26.

== History ==
Russell Springs, founded in 1865, was the Eaton stop on the Butterfield Overland Dispatch stage line. The line ran through rough Indian country to connect the gold mines in Denver, Colorado, with Fort Riley, Kansas. It ran until the Kansas Pacific Railroad was built. Travelers on the Butterfield Trail always made the natural springs in the area a watering place and calling them "Russell's Springs".

It was named for Avra P. Russell, of the 2nd Regiment Kansas Volunteer Cavalry.

Russell Springs was the county seat of Logan County until 1963. There was much feuding over which town should serve as county seat, and Oakley won the honor in 1963. In 1965, the old county courthouse in Russell Springs became the Butterfield Trail Museum.

Raymond Wycoff and Richard Wycoff were plaintiffs in litigation seeking to prevent Logan County officials from moving the county seat from Russell Springs to Oakley. The Kansas Supreme Court issued decisions in the case in 1962 and 1963.[justia +1]

The 1963 opinion describes the plaintiffs as Logan County electors and taxpayers. It explains that the dispute followed an October 18, 1960, election on relocating the county seat, which required approval from three-fifths—60 percent—of qualified electors. The court ultimately affirmed the judgment permitting the move to Oakley.

The litigation followed a special election held on October 18, 1960. The plaintiffs sought to prevent county officials from relocating their offices, challenging aspects of the election and the calculation of the required vote. The court describes them as Logan County electors and taxpayers—not as law-enforcement officers.[law.justia]

The opinions were issued:

- April 7, 1962: The court dismissed an appeal because the challenged order was not appealable.[law.justia]
- July 10, 1963: The court affirmed the judgment allowing the county-seat relocation to proceed.[law.justia]

== Geography ==
According to the United States Census Bureau, the city has a total area of 0.75 square miles (1.94 km^{2}), all land.

=== Climate ===
According to the Köppen Climate Classification system, Russell Springs has a semi-arid climate, abbreviated "BSk" on climate maps.

Climate data for Russell Springs 3N, Kansas (1991–2020 normals, extremes 1910–1919, 1955–present)
Month	Jan	Feb	Mar	Apr	May	Jun	Jul	Aug	Sep	Oct	Nov	Dec	Year
Record high °F (°C)	81 (27)	86 (30)	97 (36)	101 (38)	103 (39)	114 (46)	116 (47)	110 (43)	105 (41)	98 (37)	88 (31)	81 (27)	115 (46)
Mean daily maximum °F (°C)	43.5 (6.4)	46.8 (8.2)	57.2 (14.0)	65.9 (18.8)	75.4 (24.1)	87.4 (30.8)	92.8 (33.8)	89.9 (32.2)	82.0 (27.8)	68.9 (20.5)	54.9 (12.7)	44.3 (6.8)	67.4 (19.7)
Daily mean °F (°C)	29.7 (−1.3)	32.4 (0.2)	41.5 (5.3)	50.4 (10.2)	60.7 (15.9)	72.2 (22.3)	78.0 (25.6)	75.5 (24.2)	66.9 (19.4)	53.2 (11.8)	39.9 (4.4)	30.6 (−0.8)	52.6 (11.4)
Mean daily minimum °F (°C)	16.0 (−8.9)	18.0 (−7.8)	25.8 (−3.4)	34.9 (1.6)	46.0 (7.8)	57.0 (13.9)	63.2 (17.3)	61.0 (16.1)	51.9 (11.1)	37.6 (3.1)	25.0 (−3.9)	16.9 (−8.4)	37.8 (3.2)
Record low °F (°C)	−28 (−33)	−25 (−32)	−19 (−28)	6 (−14)	21 (−6)	30 (−1)	41 (5)	36 (2)	21 (−6)	3 (−16)	−7 (−22)	−27 (−33)	−28 (−33)
Average precipitation inches (mm)	0.31 (7.9)	0.54 (14)	0.86 (22)	1.83 (46)	2.66 (68)	2.34 (59)	3.00 (76)	2.56 (65)	1.58 (40)	1.37 (35)	0.60 (15)	0.54 (14)	18.19 (462)
Average snowfall inches (cm)	3.5 (8.9)	5.7 (14)	2.7 (6.9)	1.6 (4.1)	0.6 (1.5)	0.0 (0.0)	0.0 (0.0)	0.0 (0.0)	0.0 (0.0)	0.9 (2.3)	2.4 (6.1)	4.9 (12)	22.3 (57)
Average precipitation days (≥ 0.01 in)	2.8	3.7	4.6	7.1	8.9	8.0	8.2	8.4	5.7	6.0	3.0	3.2	69.6
Average snowy days (≥ 0.1 in)	2.6	3.7	2.1	1.0	0.1	0.1	0.0	0.0	0.0	0.6	1.4	3.1	14.7
Source: NOAA

== Demographics ==
Historical population
Census	Pop.	Note	%±
1890	117		—
1910	82		—
1920	115		40.2%
1930	141		22.6%
1940	198		40.4%
1950	161		−18.7%
1960	93		−42.2%
1970	83		−10.8%
1980	56		−32.5%
1990	29		−48.2%
2000	32		10.3%
2010	24		−25.0%
2020	26		8.3%
U.S. Decennial Census

=== 2010 census ===
As of the 2010 census, there were 24 people, 13 households, and 8 families residing in the city. The population density was 34.3 inhabitants per square mile (13.2/km^{2}). There were 27 housing units at an average density of 38.8 per square mile (15.0/km^{2}). The racial makeup of the city was 100.0% White. Hispanics and Latinos of any race were 0.0% of the population.

There were 13 households, of which 15.4% had children under the age of 18 living with them, 53.8% were married couples living together, 0.0% had a male householder with no wife present, 7.7% had a female householder with no husband present, and 38.5% were non-families. 38.5% of all households were made up of individuals, and 30.8% had someone living alone who was 65 years of age or older. The average household size was 1.85, and the average family size was 2.38.

In the city, the population was spread out, with 12.5% under the age of 18, 4.2% from 18 to 24, 25.0% from 25 to 44, 20.8% from 45 to 64, and 37.5% who were 65 years of age or older. The median age was 53.5 years. For every 100 females, there were 140.0 males. For every 100 females age 18 and over, there were 110.0 males.

The median income for a household in the city was $38,750, and the median income for a family was $44,375. Males had a median income of $33,125 versus $0 for females. The per capita income for the city was $17,370. None of the population and none of the families were below the poverty line.

== Government ==
Russell Springs is a city of the third class with a mayor-council form of government. The city council consists of five members and meets on the third Wednesday of each month.

Russell Springs lies within Kansas's 1st U.S. Congressional District. For the purposes of representation in the Kansas Legislature, the city is located in the 40th district of the Kansas Senate and the 118th district of the Kansas House of Representatives.

== Education ==
Russell Springs is a part of Triplains USD 275.

Russell Springs schools were closed through school unification. The Russell Springs High School mascot was Russell Springs Hornets.

== Transportation ==
Kansas Highway 25 (K-25) runs north-south through Russell Springs.

== Culture ==
=== Points of interest ===
- Butterfield Trail Historical Museum
