= McAllaster, Kansas =

Ghost town in Logan County, Kansas, United States

Coordinates: 39°0′22″N 101°23′30″W

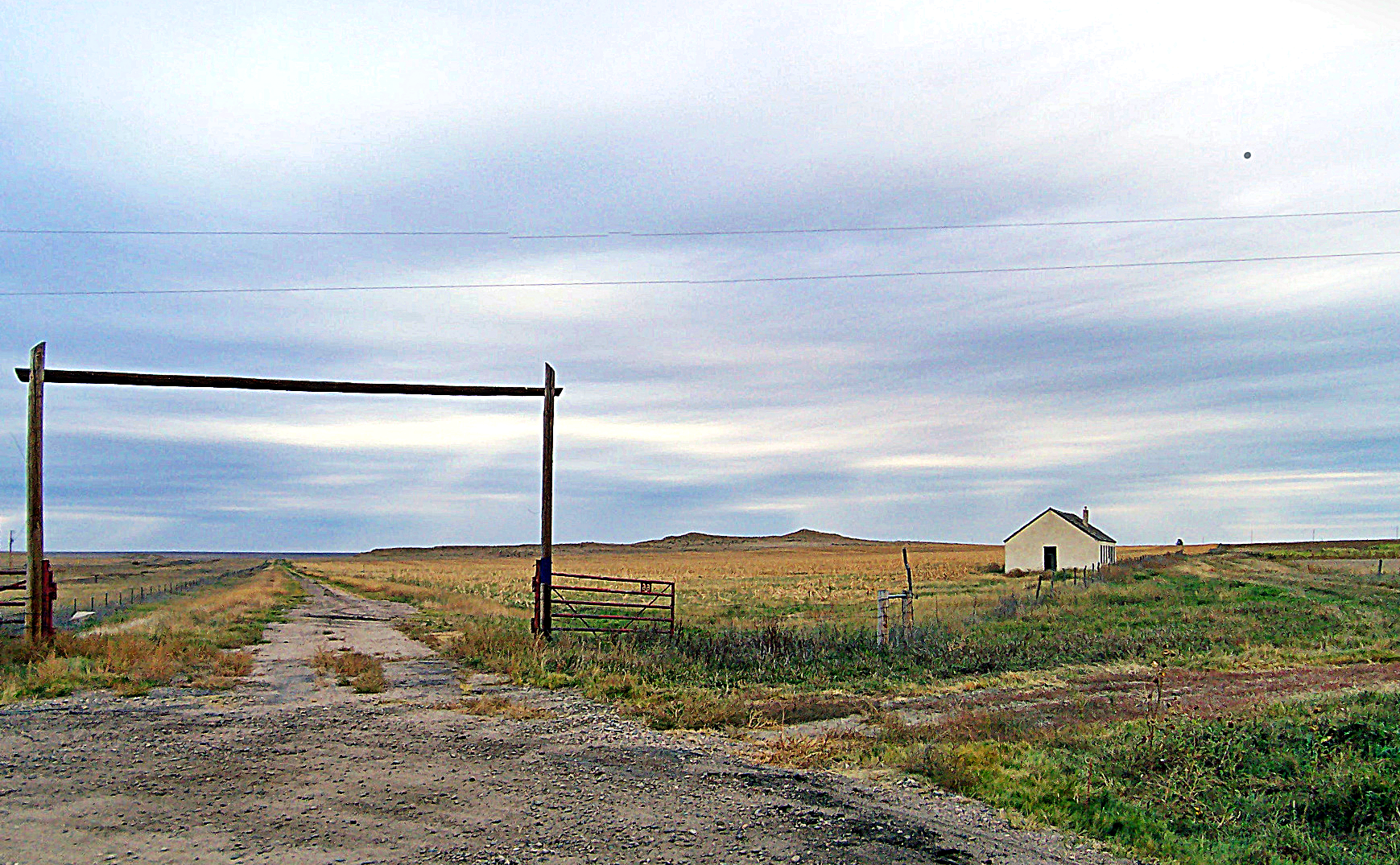
Overview of the ghost town, October 2005. In the background there is the McAllaster Butte, where Elasmosaurus was first discovered in 1867

McAllaster is a ghost town in Logan County, Kansas, United States.

== History ==
McAllaster was platted in 1887. The McAllaster post office was discontinued in 1953.

One house is all that remains of this former community.

=== Paleontology ===
McAllaster is mainly known for its mound bearing its name, the McAllaster Butte, where the first known fossils of the famous plesiosaur Elasmosaurus were discovered in 1867. Other fossils possibly belonging to this latter have been discovered since, and the locality is dated to the Campanian stage of the Upper Cretaceous.

== See also ==
- List of ghost towns in Kansas
