= Monument, Kansas =

Unincorporated community in Logan County, Kansas

- Unincorporated community and CDP
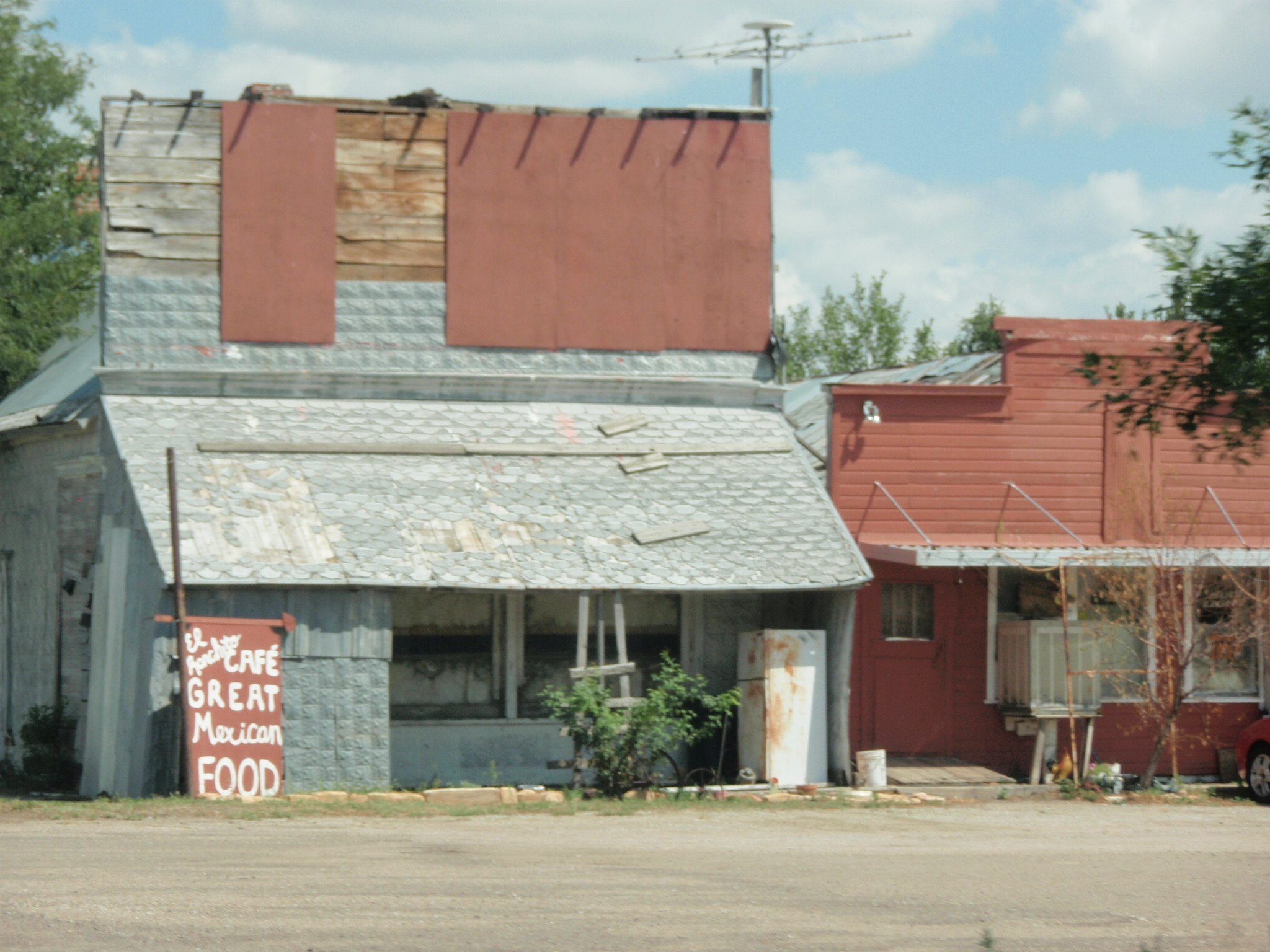
- Buildings in Monument (2011)

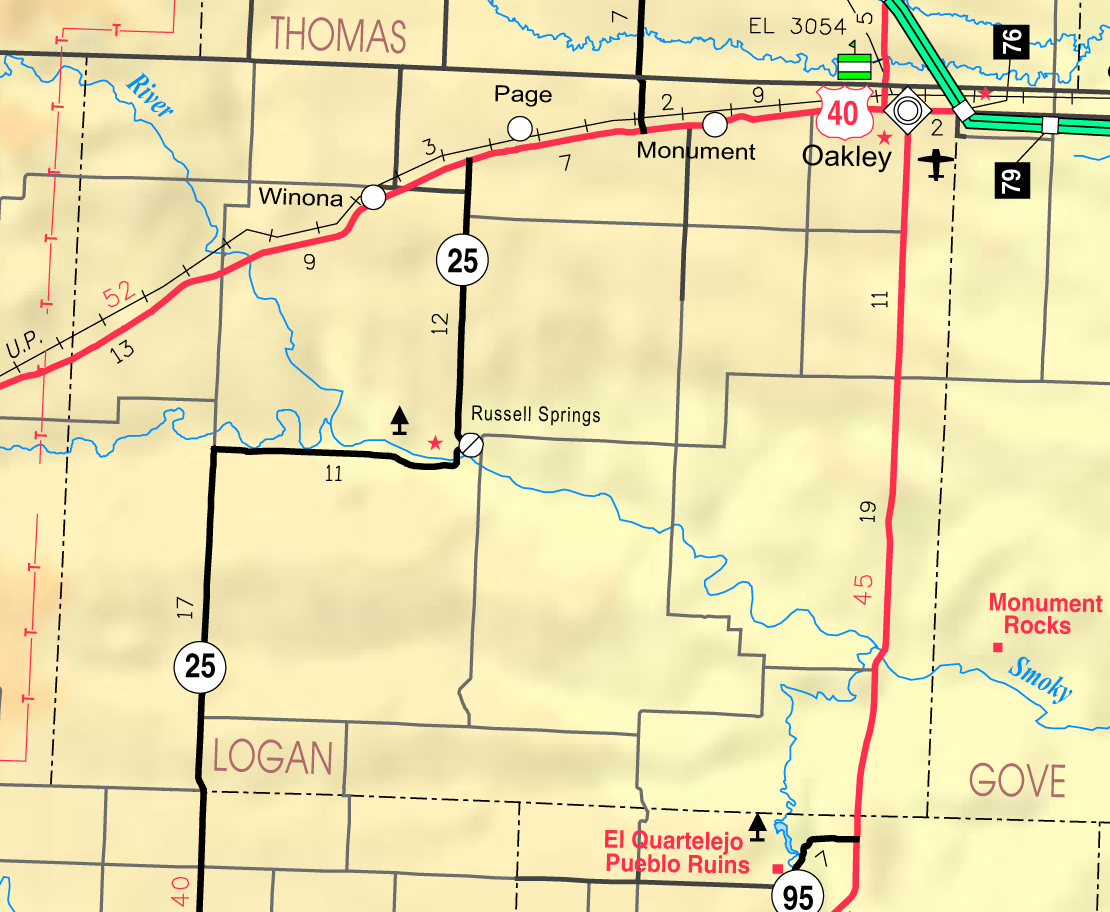
- KDOT map of Logan County (legend)

- Location within Kansas Location within the United States
- Coordinates: 39°6′16″N 101°0′26″W
- Country: United States
- State: Kansas
- County: Logan
- Elevation: 3,173 ft (967 m)

Population (2020)
  - Total: 56
- Time zone: UTC-6 (CST)
  - Summer (DST): UTC-5 (CDT)
- Area code: 785
- FIPS code: 20-48025
- GNIS ID: 471338

Monument is an unincorporated community and census-designated place (CDP) in northeastern Logan County, Kansas, United States. As of the 2020 census, the population was 56. It is located along U.S. Route 40, west of Oakley.

== History ==
Established sometime in the latter half of the 19th century, it was originally called Monument Station as it served as a stop for the overland stage and for travelers moving westward through Fort Wallace.

== Geography ==
=== Climate ===
According to the Köppen Climate Classification system, Monument has a semi-arid climate, abbreviated "BSk" on climate maps.

== Demographics ==
Historical population
Census	Pop.	Note	%±
2020	56		—
U.S. Decennial Census

=== 2020 census ===
The 2020 United States census counted 56 people, 23 households, and 11 families in Monument. The population density was 104.3 per square mile (40.3/km^{2}). There were 36 housing units at an average density of 67.0 per square mile (25.9/km^{2}). The racial makeup was 76.79% (43) white or European American (76.79% non-Hispanic white), 1.79% (1) black or African-American, 0.0% (0) Native American or Alaska Native, 0.0% (0) Asian, 0.0% (0) Pacific Islander or Native Hawaiian, 7.14% (4) from other races, and 14.29% (8) from two or more races. Hispanic or Latino of any race was 7.14% (4) of the population.

Of the 23 households, 8.7% had children under the age of 18; 43.5% were married couples living together; 26.1% had a female householder with no spouse or partner present. 43.5% of households consisted of individuals and 26.1% had someone living alone who was 65 years of age or older. The average household size was 1.7 and the average family size was 3.0. The percent of those with a bachelor's degree or higher was estimated to be 12.5% of the population.

19.6% of the population was under the age of 18, 10.7% from 18 to 24, 21.4% from 25 to 44, 21.4% from 45 to 64, and 26.8% who were 65 years of age or older. The median age was 33.7 years. For every 100 females, there were 69.7 males. For every 100 females ages 18 and older, there were 55.2 males.

== Transportation ==
U.S. Route 40 highway and Union Pacific Railroad pass through Monument.
