= East Hale Township, Kansas =

Township in Thomas County, Kansas, U.S.

East Hale Township
- Township
- Location within Thomas County
- Coordinates: 39.373711°N 101.222711°W
- Country: United States
- State: Kansas
- County: Thomas

Government
  - Trustee: Wade McCoy

Area
  - Total: 53.895 sq mi (139.59 km^{2})
  - Land: 53.895 sq mi (139.59 km^{2})
  - Water: 0 sq mi (0 km^{2}) 0%

Population (2020)
  - Total: 105
  - Density: 1.95/sq mi (0.752/km^{2})
- Time zone: UTC-6 (CST)
  - Summer (DST): UTC-5 (CDT)
- Area code: 785
- GNIS feature ID: 471191

East Hale Township is a township in Thomas County, Kansas, United States. As of the 2020 census, its population was 105.

== Geography ==
East Hale Township covers an area of 53.895 square miles (139.59 km^{2}), all of it land.

=== Communities ===
- Levant

=== Adjacent townships ===
Barrett Township, Thomas County
		north	northeast	Rovohl Township, Thomas County
West Hale Township, Thomas County	west	self	east	Morgan Township, Thomas County
		south	southeast	Summers Township, Thomas County
Kingery Township, Thomas County

== Transportation ==
=== Major highways ===
- I-70
- I-70 BS
- US-24

== Demographics ==
As of the 2020 census, the township had a population of 105, giving a population density of 1.95 people per square mile (0.75 people/km^{2}). The racial makeup of the township was 92.4% White, 1.9% Black or African American, 1.9% from some other race, and 3.8% from two or more races. Hispanics or Latinos of any race were 1.0% of the population.

The 2020–2024 American Community Survey estimated that the township contained 72 households and 78 housing units.
