= Winona, Kansas =

City in Logan County, Kansas

- City
- Location within Logan County and Kansas

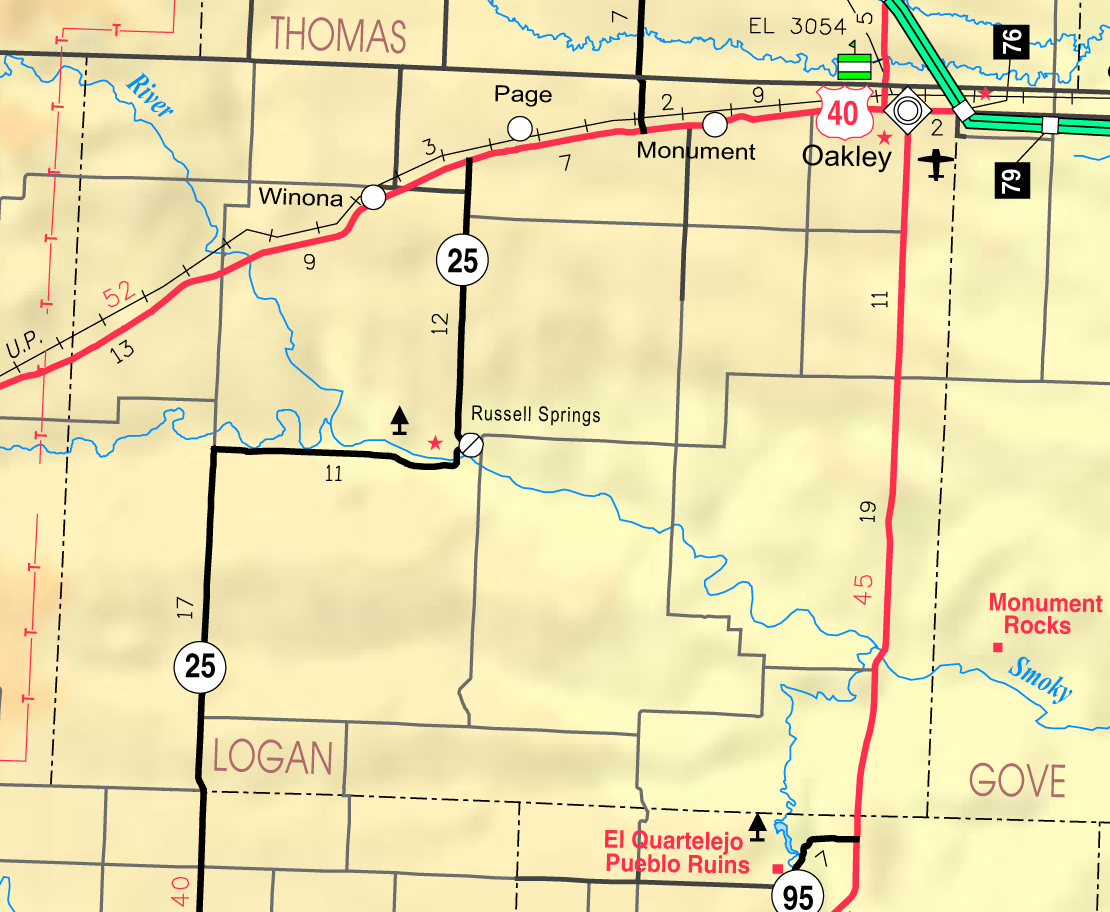
- KDOT map of Logan County (legend)
- Coordinates: 39°03′42″N 101°14′42″W
- Country: United States
- State: Kansas
- County: Logan
- Founded: 1884 (Gopher)
- Incorporated: 1920
- Named for: Wenonah

Area
  - Total: 0.26 sq mi (0.67 km^{2})
  - Land: 0.26 sq mi (0.67 km^{2})
  - Water: 0 sq mi (0.00 km^{2})
- Elevation: 3,327 ft (1,014 m)

Population (2020)
  - Total: 193
  - Density: 750/sq mi (290/km^{2})
- Time zone: UTC-6 (Central (CST))
  - Summer (DST): UTC-5 (CDT)
- ZIP Code: 67764
- Area code: 785
- FIPS code: 20-80075
- GNIS ID: 2397350

Winona is a city in Logan County, Kansas, United States. As of the 2020 census, the population of the city was 193.

== History ==
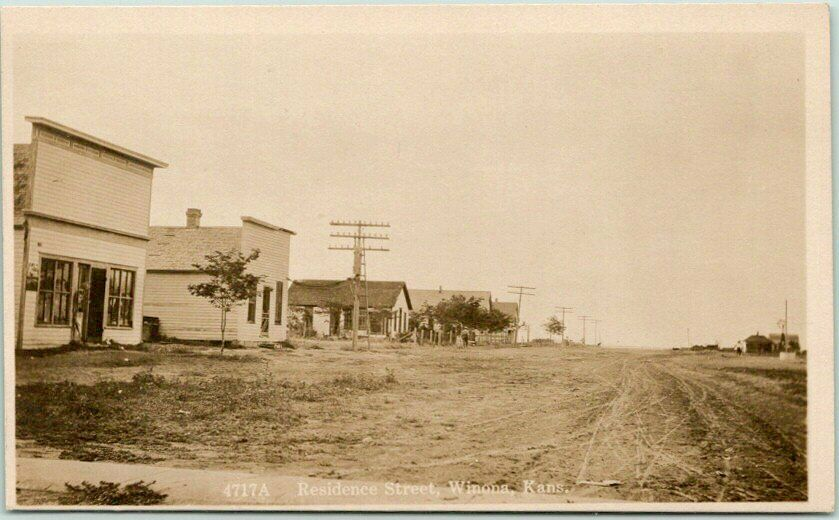
Winona as seen in 1911

Winona was originally known as Gopher, and under the latter name was founded in 1884. It was renamed Winona in 1887. The community is named after the character Wenonah, the mother of Hiawatha in Longfellow's epic poem The Song of Hiawatha (1855).

== Geography ==
According to the United States Census Bureau, the city has a total area of 0.26 square miles (0.67 km^{2}), all land.

=== Climate ===
According to the Köppen Climate Classification system, Winona has a semi-arid climate, abbreviated "BSk" on climate maps.

Climate data for Winona, Kansas (1991–2020)
Month	Jan	Feb	Mar	Apr	May	Jun	Jul	Aug	Sep	Oct	Nov	Dec	Year
Mean daily maximum °F (°C)	44.3 (6.8)	47.5 (8.6)	58.1 (14.5)	65.4 (18.6)	75.2 (24.0)	86.3 (30.2)	91.0 (32.8)	88.2 (31.2)	81.1 (27.3)	68.6 (20.3)	54.9 (12.7)	44.7 (7.1)	67.1 (19.5)
Daily mean °F (°C)	31.2 (−0.4)	33.3 (0.7)	42.9 (6.1)	50.5 (10.3)	61.0 (16.1)	72.4 (22.4)	77.5 (25.3)	75.0 (23.9)	67.1 (19.5)	54.1 (12.3)	41.0 (5.0)	31.7 (−0.2)	53.1 (11.8)
Mean daily minimum °F (°C)	18.1 (−7.7)	19.2 (−7.1)	27.6 (−2.4)	35.6 (2.0)	46.7 (8.2)	58.4 (14.7)	64.1 (17.8)	61.8 (16.6)	53.1 (11.7)	39.6 (4.2)	27.2 (−2.7)	18.6 (−7.4)	39.2 (4.0)
Average precipitation inches (mm)	0.30 (7.6)	0.45 (11)	0.85 (22)	1.57 (40)	2.65 (67)	2.76 (70)	3.64 (92)	3.13 (80)	1.58 (40)	1.41 (36)	0.64 (16)	0.49 (12)	19.47 (493.6)
Average snowfall inches (cm)	3.1 (7.9)	3.6 (9.1)	2.9 (7.4)	0.8 (2.0)	0.6 (1.5)	0.0 (0.0)	0.0 (0.0)	0.0 (0.0)	0.1 (0.25)	1.3 (3.3)	1.7 (4.3)	3.3 (8.4)	17.4 (44.15)
Source: NOAA

== Demographics ==
Historical population
Census	Pop.	Note	%±
1930	324		—
1940	317		−2.2%
1950	382		20.5%
1960	393		2.9%
1970	293		−25.4%
1980	258		−11.9%
1990	194		−24.8%
2000	228		17.5%
2010	162		−28.9%
2020	193		19.1%
U.S. Decennial Census

=== 2010 census ===
As of the census of 2010, there were 162 people, 74 households, and 40 families residing in the city. The population density was 623.1 inhabitants per square mile (240.6/km^{2}). There were 107 housing units at an average density of 411.5 per square mile (158.9/km^{2}). The racial makeup of the city was 96.9% White, 0.6% Asian, 1.9% from other races, and 0.6% from two or more races. Hispanic or Latino of any race were 3.1% of the population.

There were 74 households, of which 23.0% had children under the age of 18 living with them, 50.0% were married couples living together, 1.4% had a female householder with no husband present, 2.7% had a male householder with no wife present, and 45.9% were non-families. 40.5% of all households were made up of individuals, and 13.6% had someone living alone who was 65 years of age or older. The average household size was 2.19 and the average family size was 3.00.

The median age in the city was 44.7 years. 23.5% of residents were under the age of 18; 5.6% were between the ages of 18 and 24; 21.6% were from 25 to 44; 30.2% were from 45 to 64; and 19.1% were 65 years of age or older. The gender makeup of the city was 50.0% male and 50.0% female.

=== 2000 census ===
As of the census of 2000, there were 228 people, 84 households, and 56 families residing in the city. The population density was 900.7 inhabitants per square mile (347.8/km^{2}). There were 103 housing units at an average density of 406.9 per square mile (157.1/km^{2}). The racial makeup of the city was 97.81% White, 0.44% African American, 0.44% Native American, 0.44% Asian, and 0.88% from two or more races. Hispanic or Latino of any race were 0.88% of the population.

There were 84 households, out of which 36.9% had children under the age of 18 living with them, 58.3% were married couples living together, 6.0% had a female householder with no husband present, and 33.3% were non-families. 29.8% of all households were made up of individuals, and 19.0% had someone living alone who was 65 years of age or older. The average household size was 2.71 and the average family size was 3.52.

In the city, the population was spread out, with 32.0% under the age of 18, 10.1% from 18 to 24, 25.4% from 25 to 44, 18.0% from 45 to 64, and 14.5% who were 65 years of age or older. The median age was 34 years. For every 100 females, there were 98.3 males. For every 100 females age 18 and over, there were 101.3 males.

The median income for a household in the city was $31,875, and the median income for a family was $35,500. Males had a median income of $24,821 versus $12,500 for females. The per capita income for the city was $15,596. About 14.5% of families and 16.7% of the population were below the poverty line, including 23.6% of those under the age of eighteen and 4.3% of those 65 or over.

== Education ==
The community is served by Triplains USD 275 public school district.

Winona schools were closed through school unification. The Winona High School mascot was Tigers. The Winona Tigers won the Kansas State High School boys class BB Basketball championship in 1962 and the girls class 1A Volleyball championship in 1971 and 1972.

Winona is now home to Triplains High School, a unification of Winona, Page City, and Russell Springs schools. Their mascot is the Vikings. However, they are now combined with Brewster High School for sports and the mascot is the Triplains-Brewster Titans.

== Transportation ==
U.S. Route 40 highway and Union Pacific Railroad pass through Winona.
