= K-25 (Kansas highway) =

State highway in Kansas, U.S.

K-25
- K-25 highlighted in red

Route information
- Maintained by KDOT and the cities of Ulysses, Lakin and Colby
- Length: 238.259 mi (383.441 km)
- Existed: 1927–present

Major junctions
- South end: SH-136 near Hugoton
- US-56 / K-51 in Hugoton; US-160 in Ulysses; US-50 / US-400 in Lakin; K-96 in Leoti; US-40 near Winona; I-70 in Colby; US-24 in Colby; US-36 in Atwood
- North end: N-25 near Trenton, NE

Location
- Country: United States
- State: Kansas
- Counties: Stevens, Grant, Kearny, Wichita, Logan, Thomas, Rawlins

Highway system
- Kansas State Highway System; Interstate; US; State; Spurs
← US-24	→ K-26

K-25 is a 238.259-mile-long (383.441 km) south–north state highway in the U.S. State of Kansas. K-25 runs from Oklahoma State Highway 136 (SH-136) at the Oklahoma State Line to Nebraska Highway 25 (N-25) at the Nebraska border, running through Leoti, Colby, and Atwood plus many more towns along the way.

K-25 was first designated as a state highway in 1927 and at that time began at K-45 west of Moscow, and ran north to the Nebraska border and continued as N-25. In 1959, the highway was extended south from, US-56 and K-51 to the Oklahoma border.

== Route description ==
K-25 enters Kansas from Oklahoma, acting as a continuation of SH-136. K-25 continues north for three miles (4.8 km) and intersects Road D. The highway proceeds through flat rural farmland for about 7.8 miles (12.6 km) then intersects K-51 and U.S. Route 56 (US-56). K-25 turns northeast and begins to overlap K-51 and US-56. The highways continue parallel to Cimarron Valley Railroad tracks for roughly 4.6 miles (7.4 km) then curves east. The roadway passes north of an airport about 1.8 miles (2.9 km) later then enters the city of Hugoton as 11th Street. K-25, K-51 and US-56 continue approximately .3 miles (0.48 km) then passes the Hugoton Middle and High Schools. The highway then soon reaches Main Street, where K-25 and US-56 turn north, as K-51 continues east. K-25 and US-56 proceed north along Main Street for 1.3 miles (2.1 km) before curving northeast and exiting the city. The roadway continues about .8 miles (1.3 km) then K-25 turns north and crosses the Cimarron Valley Railroad tracks, as US-56 continues northeast. K-25 continues north through relatively flat farmland for roughly four miles (6.4 km) then intersects Road U. The highway advances another four miles (6.4 km) and intersects Road Y. The roadway then enters into Grant County about five miles (8.0 km) later.

As the highway enters the county it curves slightly northeast. K-25 continues for roughly two miles (3.2 km) then curves northwest and crosses the Cimarron River. The roadway then crosses over the Old Santa Fe Trail before curving back north. K-25 advances north through flat rural farmlands for about 1.15 miles (1.85 km) and intersects County Road 19, then County Road 17 about two miles (3.2 km) later. The highway continues through flat farmland for four point two miles (6.8 km) where it crosses the North Fork Cimarron River. About .3 miles (0.48 km) later K-25 enters Ulysses as Colorado Street. The highway proceeds through the city for about .5 miles (0.80 km) then crosses a Cimarron Valley Railroad track. The roadway then intersects US-160, also known as Oklahoma Street. K-25 continues north for about 1.2 miles (1.9 km) before exiting the city. The highway then passes by the Ulysses Airport for roughly 1.85 miles (2.98 km) then intersects County Road 9. K-25 continues for approximately four miles (6.4 km) and intersects County Road 5. The highway advances north through flat farmland for about four miles (6.4 km) then enters into Kearny County.

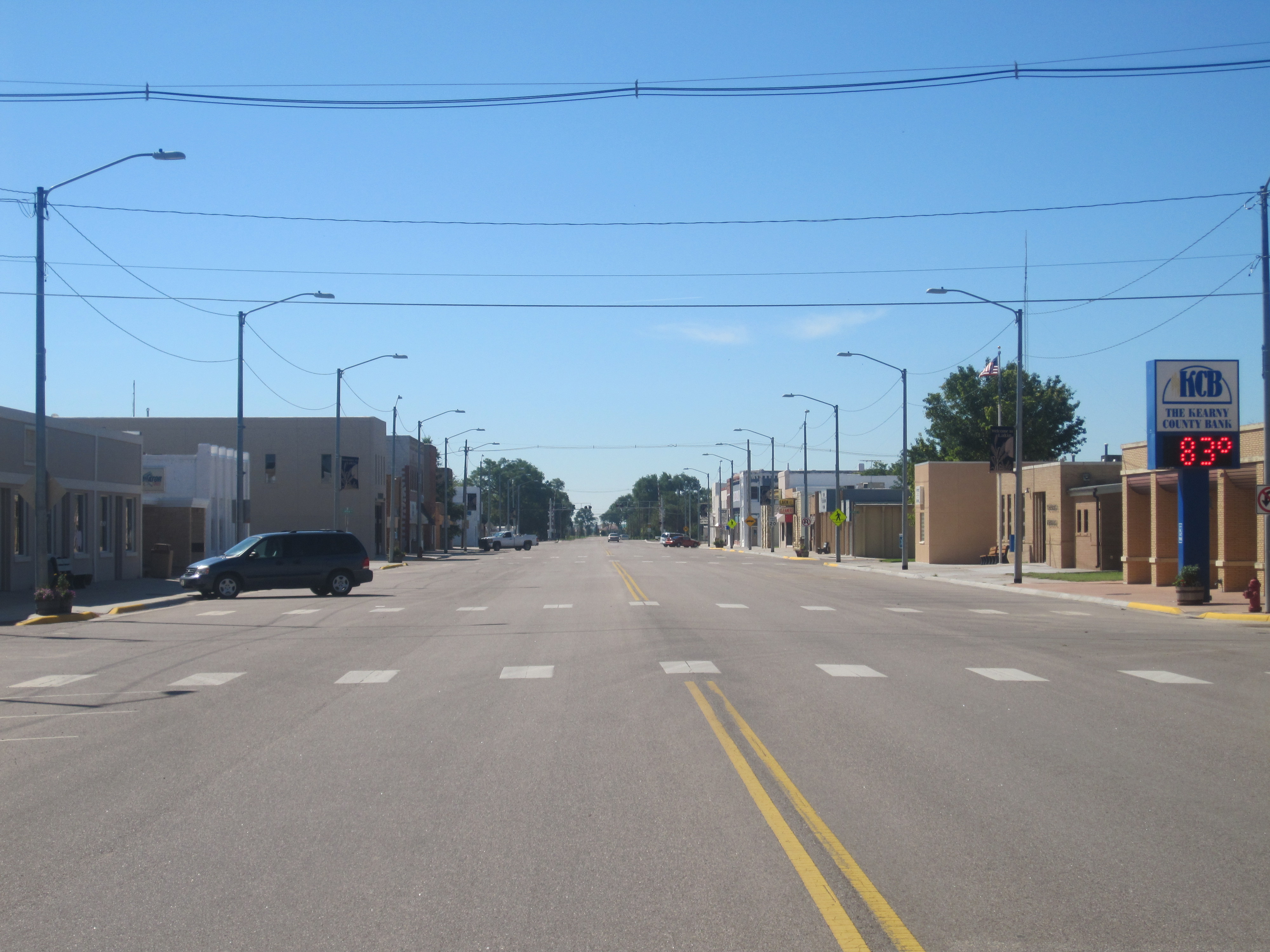
K-25 as it passes through Lakin

The highway then reaches Lakin, where K-25 junctions US-50 and US-400 at the same time, and Leoti, where K-96 is intersected.

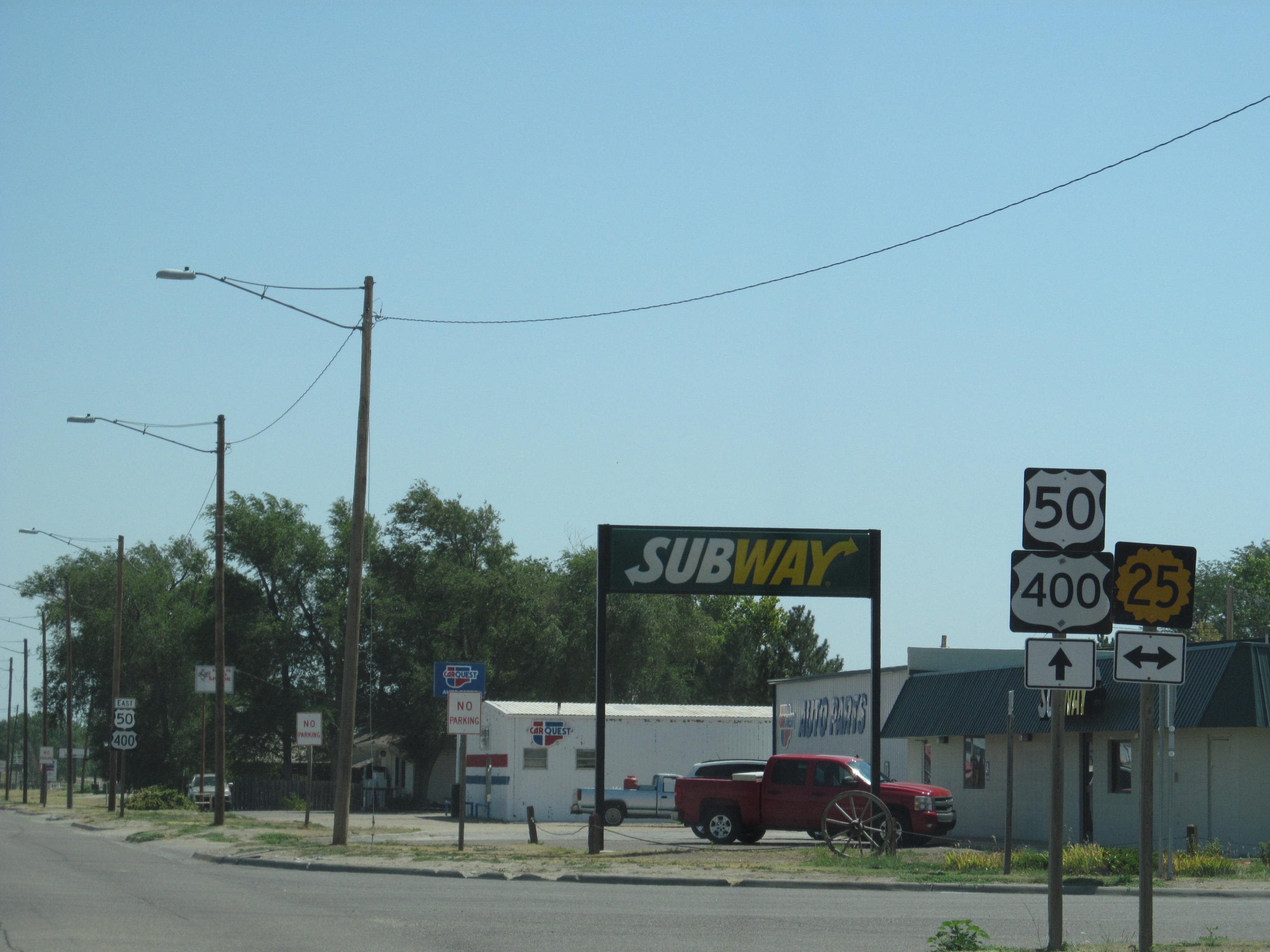
K-25 where it intersects US-50 and US-400

After leaving Leoti, K-25 continues due north for about 20 miles, until the route turns east for about 8 miles, until turning back north, immediately passing through Russell Springs. North of Russell Springs, US-40 is intersected, sharing an overlap for about ten miles. After turning onto US-40, the road starts to become hillier. K-25 separates just west of Baker. From there, it goes north to Colby, traveling through lightly rolling hills. Just south of Colby, I-70 is junctioned, with a good number of services near the interchange. K-25 then becomes a 4 lane divided highway until it enters Colby, where it changes back into a surface street. Within the Colby city limits, US-24 is intersected. K-25 continues out of Colby, alternating between flat and rolling land. In Atwood, US-36 is intersected. K-25 leaves Atwood traveling through rolling hills at first, but flattens out as it continues north. K-25 exits Kansas into Nebraska where N-25 continues toward Trenton, Nebraska.

The Kansas Department of Transportation (KDOT) tracks the traffic levels on its highways, and in 2018, they determined that on average the traffic varied from 230 vehicles south of Russell Springs, 2400 vehicles south of Lakin, to between 2500 and 5000 vehicles in Ulysses. K-25 is not included in the National Highway System, a system of highways important to the nation's defense, economy, and mobility. K-25 does connect to the National Highway System at its junction with US-50 and US-400 in Lakin, and at I-70 in Colby.

== History ==
=== Establishment and extensions ===
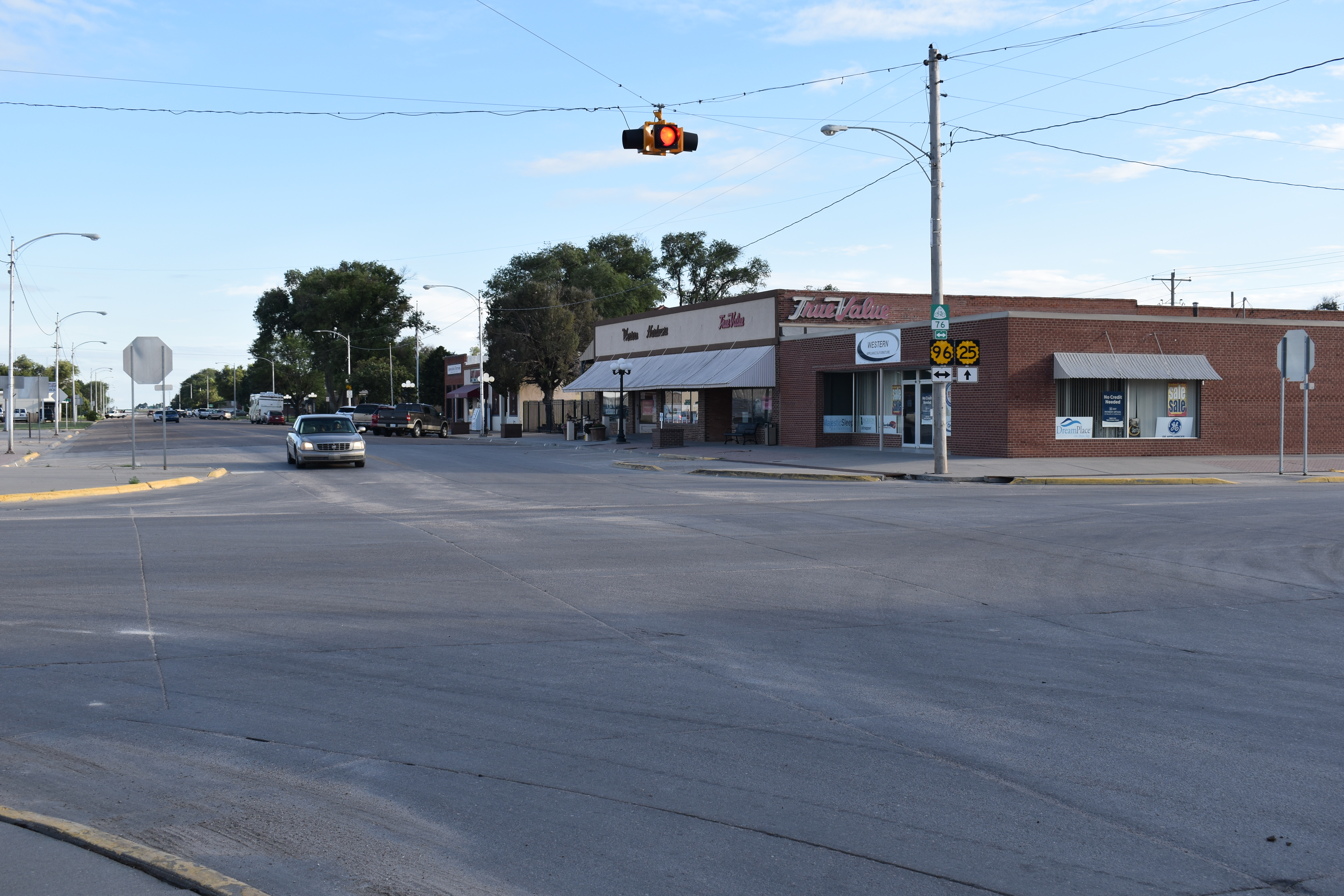
K-25 southbound at K-96

In 1926, two sections of K-25 were established as K-23. One section went from Hugoton north to Leoti and the other section began in Russell Springs and ran north to the Nebraska border. By 1927, it was renumbered as K-25. At that time it began at K-45 west of Moscow, and ran north to K-46 in New Ulysses. It then continued to Leoti, where it intersected K-96. From here it continued northward through Russell Springs to US-40S east of Winona. The two routes then overlapped to Oakley, where it left US-40S and joined K-22 northward. The two routes continued northward to US-40N, where K-25 left the overlap and joined US-40N westbound. The two routes then continued west to Colby, where K-25 left the overlap and headed north. It soon crossed K-2 the crossed into Nebraska and continued as N-25. In a July 22, 1959 resolution, the section of highway had been brought up to state highway standards from the Oklahoma border to US-56 and K-51, and it became a southward extension of K-25.

=== Realignments ===
In a June 6, 1936 resolution, K-25 was slightly to eliminate two sharp curves, north of Lakin along the Kearny–Wichita county line. Between February 1937 and January 1938, US-270 was extended into Kansas, and overlapped K-25 from the Hugoton to Ulysses. Then in a May 18, 1981 resolution, the US-270 designation was removed. In a September 12, 1938 resolution, a 13.7-mile-long (22.0 km) section of K-25 was realigned southwest of Lakin to eliminate four sharp curves. In a November 12, 1947 resolution, K-25 was realigned in and east of Leoti. In a March 30, 1950 resolution, K-25 and US-270 was realigned slightly east where it crosses the South Fork Cimarron River, just north of the Grant–Stevens county line. In a February 13, 1952 resolution, it was slightly realigned, southwest of Russell Springs. Also a new bridge was built across the Smoky Hill River. In two separate August 11, 1954 resolutions, Logan and Thomas counties had finished bringing the section of roadway, from west of Monument north to Colby, up to state highway standards. The section then became a realignment of K-25. In a March 9, 1955 resolution, the highway was realigned south of Atwood to eliminate four sharp curves.

== Major intersections ==
County	Location	mi	km	Destinations	Notes
Stevens		0.000	0.000	SH-136 south – Guymon	Continuation into Oklahoma
Stevens		10.861	17.479	US-56 west / K-51 west – Rolla, Elkhart	Southern end of US-56/K-51 overlap
Stevens	Hugoton	18.496	29.766	K-51 east – Liberal	Northern end of K-51 overlap
Stevens	Hugoton	20.642	33.220	US-56 east – Sublette	Northern end of US-56 overlap
Grant	Ulysses	47.400	76.283	US-160 – Johnson City, Sublette	
Kearny	Lakin	75.309	121.198	US-50 / US-400 – Garden City, Syracuse	
Wichita	Leoti	116.570	187.601	K-96 – Tribune, Scott City	
Logan		168.596	271.329	US-40 west – Sharon Springs	Southern end of US-40 overlap
Logan		175.797	282.918	US-40 east – Monument, Oakley	Northern end of US-40 overlap
Thomas	Colby	194.053	312.298	I-70 – Hays, Salina, Denver CO	I-70 exit 53; diamond interchange
Thomas	Colby	196.275	315.874	US-24 to I-70 – Hoxie	
Rawlins	Atwood	225.064	362.205	US-36 – Oberlin, St. Francis	
Rawlins		238.259	383.441	N-25 north – Trenton	Continuation into Nebraska
1.000 mi = 1.609 km; 1.000 km = 0.621 mi: Concurrency terminus
