= Oakley, Kansas =

City in Gove / Logan / Thomas Counties of Kansas

- City and County seat
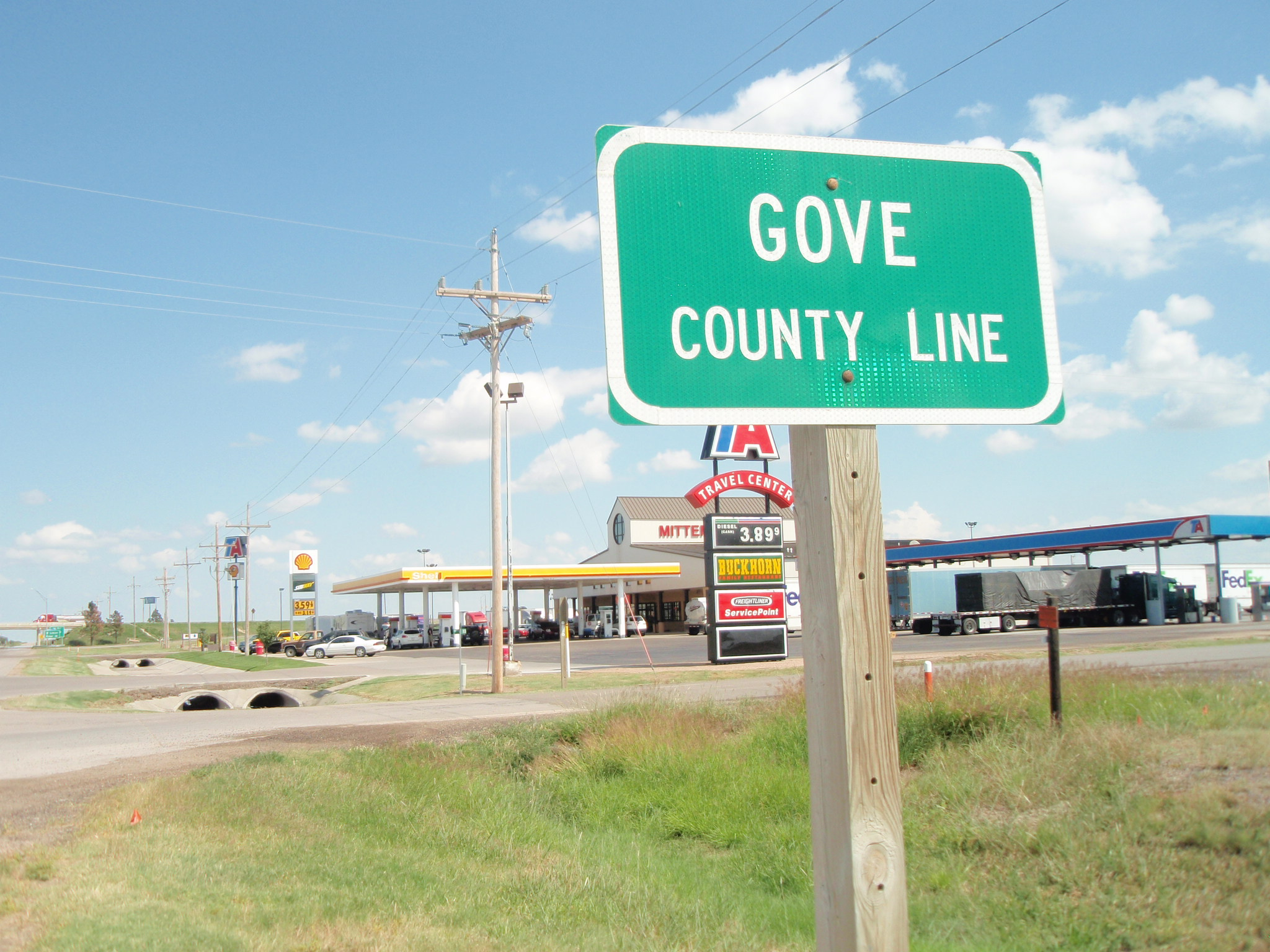
- Gas station on US Route 40 near I-70 (2011)

- Location within Logan County and Kansas

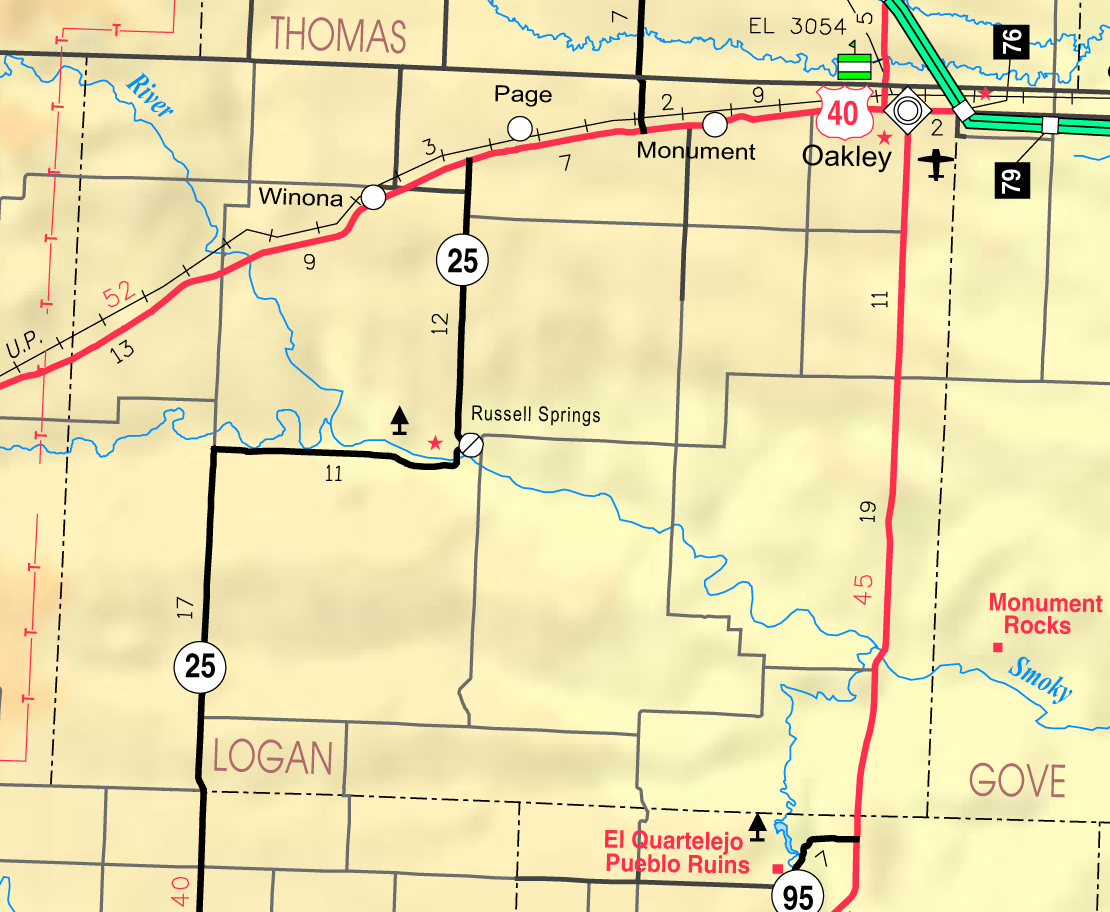
- KDOT map of Logan County (legend)
- Coordinates: 39°7′41″N 100°51′16″W
- Country: United States
- State: Kansas
- Counties: Logan, Thomas, Gove
- Founded: 1884
- Incorporated: 1887
- Named for: Elizabeth Oakley Gardner Hoag

Area
  - Total: 1.93 sq mi (4.99 km^{2})
  - Land: 1.93 sq mi (4.99 km^{2})
  - Water: 0 sq mi (0.00 km^{2})
- Elevation: 3,051 ft (930 m)

Population (2020)
  - Total: 2,046
  - Density: 1,060/sq mi (410/km^{2})
- Time zone: UTC-6 (CST)
  - Summer (DST): UTC-5 (CDT)
- ZIP Code: 67748
- Area code: 785
- FIPS code: 20-51825
- GNIS ID: 2395293
- Website: cityofoakleyks.gov

Oakley is a city in Gove, Logan, and Thomas counties in the U.S. state of Kansas. It is the county seat of Logan County. As of the 2020 census, the population of the city was 2,046.

== History ==
The area that would later become Oakley was settled in the 1870s and 1880s by travelers from the Smoky Hill Trail. Oakley was founded in 1884 by Judge Fredman and David D. Hoag. Originally named Carlyle, its name was changed to Cleveland, before settling on its final name of Oakley in 1885, named after Hoag's mother, Elizabeth Oakley Gardner Hoag.

== Geography ==
Oakley lies roughly 1 mile (1.6 km) south of the South Fork of the Saline River in the High Plains region of the Great Plains.

The city is located at the intersection of Interstate 70, U.S. Route 40, and U.S. Route 83 in northwestern Kansas. It is in the northeastern corner of Logan County, and portions of it extend into Gove County (between 8th and 9th Streets) and Thomas County (from the northeastern corner of Oakley Municipal Airport (FAA: OEL; ICAO: KOEL)). Oakley is approximately 211 miles (340 km) northwest of Wichita, 227 miles east-southeast of Denver, and 335 miles (539 km) west of Kansas City.

According to the United States Census Bureau, the city has a total area of 1.94 square miles (5.02 km^{2}), all land.

=== Climate ===
The climate in this area is characterized by hot, humid summers and generally mild to cool winters. According to the Köppen Climate Classification system, Oakley has a humid continental climate, abbreviated "Dfa" on climate maps.

Climate data for Oakley, Kansas, 1991–2020 normals, extremes 1920–present
Month	Jan	Feb	Mar	Apr	May	Jun	Jul	Aug	Sep	Oct	Nov	Dec	Year
Record high °F (°C)	82 (28)	85 (29)	92 (33)	96 (36)	103 (39)	111 (44)	111 (44)	108 (42)	105 (41)	96 (36)	87 (31)	84 (29)	111 (44)
Mean maximum °F (°C)	66.0 (18.9)	70.9 (21.6)	80.6 (27.0)	87.0 (30.6)	93.9 (34.4)	101.2 (38.4)	103.3 (39.6)	101.4 (38.6)	98.0 (36.7)	90.3 (32.4)	77.1 (25.1)	66.8 (19.3)	104.6 (40.3)
Mean daily maximum °F (°C)	42.4 (5.8)	45.3 (7.4)	55.9 (13.3)	64.5 (18.1)	74.2 (23.4)	86.3 (30.2)	91.6 (33.1)	89.0 (31.7)	81.4 (27.4)	68.0 (20.0)	53.9 (12.2)	43.5 (6.4)	66.3 (19.1)
Daily mean °F (°C)	28.9 (−1.7)	31.5 (−0.3)	40.6 (4.8)	49.2 (9.6)	59.6 (15.3)	71.4 (21.9)	76.7 (24.8)	74.4 (23.6)	66.0 (18.9)	52.5 (11.4)	39.5 (4.2)	30.2 (−1.0)	51.7 (11.0)
Mean daily minimum °F (°C)	15.5 (−9.2)	17.6 (−8.0)	25.3 (−3.7)	33.9 (1.1)	45.0 (7.2)	56.5 (13.6)	61.8 (16.6)	59.7 (15.4)	50.5 (10.3)	37.0 (2.8)	25.1 (−3.8)	16.9 (−8.4)	37.1 (2.8)
Mean minimum °F (°C)	−2.4 (−19.1)	0.0 (−17.8)	8.0 (−13.3)	20.1 (−6.6)	31.4 (−0.3)	44.0 (6.7)	52.9 (11.6)	50.9 (10.5)	36.4 (2.4)	20.8 (−6.2)	9.1 (−12.7)	−1.2 (−18.4)	−8.4 (−22.4)
Record low °F (°C)	−20 (−29)	−27 (−33)	−19 (−28)	−2 (−19)	23 (−5)	33 (1)	41 (5)	41 (5)	22 (−6)	2 (−17)	−10 (−23)	−21 (−29)	−27 (−33)
Average precipitation inches (mm)	0.36 (9.1)	0.52 (13)	1.02 (26)	1.79 (45)	3.03 (77)	2.66 (68)	3.75 (95)	2.93 (74)	1.76 (45)	1.58 (40)	0.76 (19)	0.51 (13)	20.67 (524.1)
Average snowfall inches (cm)	4.5 (11)	6.6 (17)	4.2 (11)	1.8 (4.6)	0.4 (1.0)	0.0 (0.0)	0.0 (0.0)	0.0 (0.0)	0.0 (0.0)	1.2 (3.0)	2.5 (6.4)	4.5 (11)	25.7 (65)
Average precipitation days (≥ 0.01 in)	3.1	3.9	4.8	7.1	9.7	8.8	9.1	8.8	6.2	5.6	3.2	3.0	73.3
Average snowy days (≥ 0.1 in)	2.6	3.2	1.9	1.0	0.1	0.0	0.0	0.0	0.0	0.5	1.4	2.7	13.4
Source 1: NOAA
Source 2: National Weather Service

== Demographics ==
Historical population
Census	Pop.	Note	%±
1890	176		—
1900	269		52.8%
1910	681		153.2%
1920	768		12.8%
1930	1,159		50.9%
1940	1,138		−1.8%
1950	1,915		68.3%
1960	2,190		14.4%
1970	2,327		6.3%
1980	2,343		0.7%
1990	2,045		−12.7%
2000	2,173		6.3%
2010	2,045		−5.9%
2020	2,046		0.0%
U.S. Decennial Census

=== 2020 census ===
As of the 2020 census, Oakley had a population of 2,046, with 896 households and 540 families. The population density was 1,064.0 per square mile (410.8/km^{2}). There were 1,006 housing units at an average density of 523.1 per square mile (202.0/km^{2}).

The median age was 40.1 years. 24.5% of residents were under the age of 18, 6.3% were from 18 to 24, 24.8% were from 25 to 44, 23.6% were from 45 to 64, and 20.8% were 65 years of age or older. For every 100 females there were 98.6 males, and for every 100 females age 18 and over there were 95.7 males age 18 and over.

Of Oakley's households, 29.1% had children under the age of 18 living in them. 48.8% were married-couple households, 20.5% were households with a male householder and no spouse or partner present, and 26.5% were households with a female householder and no spouse or partner present. About 34.4% of all households were made up of individuals, and 16.3% had someone living alone who was 65 years of age or older. The average household size was 2.3 and the average family size was 2.9.

Of the 1,006 housing units, 10.9% were vacant. The homeowner vacancy rate was 3.9% and the rental vacancy rate was 6.9%. 0.0% of residents lived in urban areas, while 100.0% lived in rural areas.

Racial composition as of the 2020 census
Race	Number	Percent
White	1,841	90.0%
Black or African American	2	0.1%
American Indian and Alaska Native	1	0.0%
Asian	11	0.5%
Native Hawaiian and Other Pacific Islander	2	0.1%
Some other race	79	3.9%
Two or more races	110	5.4%
Hispanic or Latino (of any race)	170	8.3%

Education

The percent of those with a bachelor's degree or higher was estimated to be 11.8% of the population.

Income and poverty

The 2016–2020 5-year American Community Survey estimates show that the median household income was $46,042 (with a margin of error of +/- $7,884) and the median family income was $60,179 (+/- $13,943). Males had a median income of $35,641 (+/- $5,149) versus $21,122 (+/- $4,807) for females. The median income for those above 16 years old was $26,514 (+/- $3,763). Approximately, 6.5% of families and 11.4% of the population were below the poverty line, including 18.2% of those under the age of 18 and 3.8% of those ages 65 or over.

=== 2010 census ===
As of the census of 2010, there were 2,045 people, 920 households, and 562 families residing in the city. The population density was 1,054.1 inhabitants per square mile (407.0/km^{2}). There were 1,035 housing units at an average density of 533.5 per square mile (206.0/km^{2}). The racial makeup of the city was 96.6% White, 0.4% African American, 0.6% Native American, 0.4% Asian, 0.7% from other races, and 1.4% from two or more races. Hispanic or Latino of any race were 2.8% of the population.

There were 920 households, of which 25.9% had children under the age of 18 living with them, 49.9% were married couples living together, 7.6% had a female householder with no husband present, 3.6% had a male householder with no wife present, and 38.9% were non-families. 35.0% of all households were made up of individuals, and 16.7% had someone living alone who was 65 years of age or older. The average household size was 2.18 and the average family size was 2.78.

The median age in the city was 44.8 years. 22.1% of residents were under the age of 18; 6.3% were between the ages of 18 and 24; 21.8% were from 25 to 44; 27.3% were from 45 to 64; and 22.6% were 65 years of age or older. The gender makeup of the city was 48.0% male and 52.0% female.

== Museums ==
The Fick Fossil and History Museum is a museum that displays large dinosaur fossils from Kansas, many old tools, mineral specimens, and shell and mineral folk art. The museum is free (donations) and open seven days a week in the summer, with shorter hours during the winter.

== Education ==
The community is served by Oakley USD 274 public school district, which operates three schools in the city:

- Oakley Elementary School (Grades Pre-K-5)
- Oakley Middle School (6-8)
- Oakley High School (9-12)

There is also one Catholic school in Oakley, St. Joseph School (Pre-K-5).

The Oakley Plainsmen have won the following Kansas State High School championships:

- 1974 Wrestling - Class 2-1A
- 1970, 1971 Cross Country Boys - Class 2-1A
- 1976 Boys Basketball - Class 2A
- 2005 Girls Cross Country - Class 2A
- 2007 Girls Basketball - Class 2A
- 1981, 1982, 1983, 1984, 1993 Volleyball - Class 3A
- 2000 Speech and Drama - Class 3A
- 1998 Two Speaker Debate - Class 3-2-1A

== Media ==
Oakley has a weekly newspaper, The Oakley Graphic, the first edition of which was published on November 22, 1889.

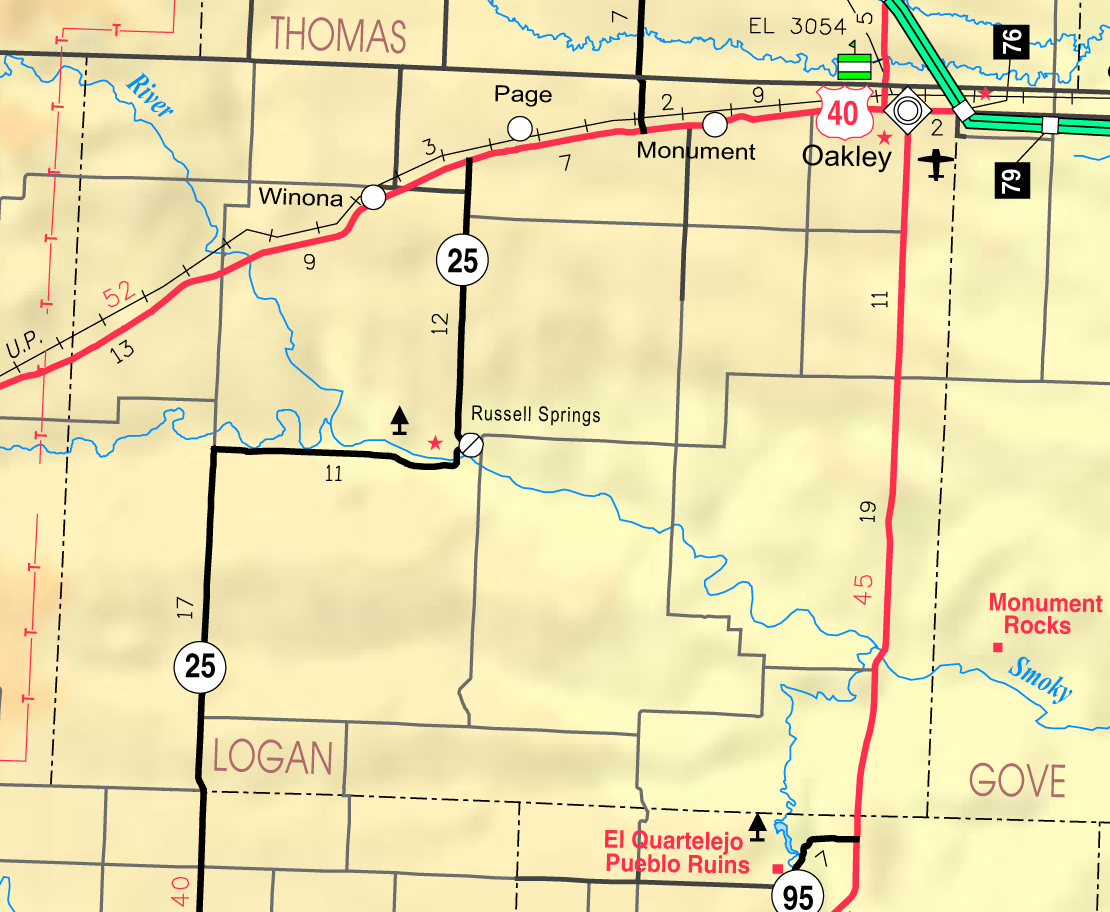
KDOT map of Logan County (legend)

== Transportation ==
U.S. Route 40 runs east–west along the southern edge of the city. U.S. Route 83, which runs north–south, intersects U.S. 40 south of the city, runs concurrently with it for one mile going west, then turns north, running along the western edge of the city. East of the city, U.S. 40 merges with Interstate 70, which approaches from the northwest, and continues east.

Oakley Municipal Airport, located southeast of the city, hosts general aviation.

The Kansas Pacific (KP) Line of the Union Pacific Railroad runs east–west through town. A branch line splits off to the northwest toward Colby.

== In popular culture ==
- Oakley, Kansas, is the site of an Earth Federation base in Mobile Suit Gundam 0083: Stardust Memory, located near the impact site of a destructive colony drop. In the show, the town name is transliterated as "Oakly."
