= Driftwood Township, Kansas =

Township in Rawlins County, Kansas, U.S.

Driftwood Township
- Township
- Location within Rawlins County
- Coordinates: 39.965409°N 101.083249°W
- Country: United States
- State: Kansas
- County: Rawlins

Government
  - District 3 County Commissioner: Lincoln Pochop

Area
  - Total: 71.684 sq mi (185.66 km^{2})
  - Land: 71.668 sq mi (185.62 km^{2})
  - Water: 0.016 sq mi (0.041 km^{2}) 0.02%

Population (2020)
  - Total: 85
  - Density: 1.2/sq mi (0.46/km^{2})
- Time zone: UTC-6 (CST)
  - Summer (DST): UTC-5 (CDT)
- Area code: 785
- GNIS feature ID: 470902

Driftwood Township is a township in Rawlins County, Kansas, United States. As of the 2020 census, its population was 85.

== Geography ==
Dirftwood Township covers an area of 71.684 square miles (185.66 square kilometers).

=== Adjacent townships ===
Hitchcock County, Nebraska
		north
Rocewood Township, Rawlins County	west	self	east	Herl Township, Rawlins County
		south	southeast	Ludell Township, Rawlins County
Center Township, Rawlins County

== Transportation ==
=== Major highways ===
- K-25
