= Atwood Township, Kansas =

Township in Rawlins County, Kansas, U.S.

Atwood Township
- Township
- Location within Rawlins County
- Coordinates: 39.814184°N 101.041865°W
- Country: United States
- State: Kansas
- County: Rawlins

Government
  - District 1 County Commissioner: Alan Solko

Area
  - Total: 6.973 sq mi (18.06 km^{2})
  - Land: 6.912 sq mi (17.90 km^{2})
  - Water: 0.061 sq mi (0.16 km^{2}) 0.87%

Population (2020)
  - Total: 1,326
  - Density: 191.8/sq mi (74.07/km^{2})
- Time zone: UTC-6 (CST)
  - Summer (DST): UTC-5 (CDT)
- Area code: 785
- GNIS feature ID: 470906

Atwood Township is a township in Rawlins County, Kansas, United States. As of the 2020 census, its population was 1,326.

== History ==
Achilles Township is home to the ghost town of Beaverton. Another extinct town, Sappa, had its post office in operation from 1881 to 1883.

== Geography ==
Atwood Township covers an area of 6.973 square miles (18.06 square kilometers).

=== Communities ===
- Atwood

=== Adjacent townships ===
The township is completely surrounded by Center Township, Rawlins County.

== Transportation ==
Atwood–Rawlins County City–County Airport is located within the township. It serves Atwood and Rawlins County as a whole.

=== Major highways ===
- US-36
- K-25
