= Barrett Township, Kansas =

Township in Thomas County, Kansas, U.S.

Barrett Township
- Township
- Location within Thomas County
- Coordinates: 39.508298°N 101.271381°W
- Country: United States
- State: Kansas
- County: Thomas

Government
  - Trustee: Lyman Bear

Area
  - Total: 106.646 sq mi (276.21 km^{2})
  - Land: 106.637 sq mi (276.19 km^{2})
  - Water: 0.009 sq mi (0.023 km^{2}) 0.01%

Population (2020)
  - Total: 109
  - Density: 1.02/sq mi (0.395/km^{2})
- Time zone: UTC-6 (CST)
  - Summer (DST): UTC-5 (CDT)
- Area code: 785
- GNIS feature ID: 471187

Barrett Township is a township in Thomas County, Kansas, United States. As of the 2020 census, its population was 109.

== Geography ==
Barrett Township covers an area of 106.646 square miles (276.21 km^{2}), 0.01% of it water.

=== Adjacent townships ===
Mirage Township, Rawlins County
Rocewood Township, Rawlins County	northwest	north	northeast	Center Township, Rawlins County
Llanos Township, Sherman County	west	self	east	Rovohl Township, Thomas County
West Hale Township, Thomas County	southwest	south	southeast	Morgan Township, Thomas County
East Hale Township, Thomas County

== Demographics ==
As of the 2020 census, the township had a population of 109, giving a population density of 1.02 people per square mile (0.39 people/km^{2}). The racial makeup of the township was 95.4% White, 1.8% Native American, 0.9% Black or African American, and 1.8% from two or more races. Hispanics or Latinos of any race were 2.8% of the population.

The 2020–2024 American Community Survey estimated that the township contained 9 households and 10 housing units.
