= Achilles Township, Kansas =

Township in Rawlins County, Kansas, U.S.

Achilles Township
- Township
- Location within Rawlins County
- Coordinates: 39.679731°N 100.828821°W
- Country: United States
- State: Kansas
- County: Rawlins

Government
  - District 1 County Commissioner: Alan Solko

Area
  - Total: 51.118 sq mi (132.40 km^{2})
  - Land: 51.108 sq mi (132.37 km^{2})
  - Water: 0.01 sq mi (0.026 km^{2}) 0.02%

Population (2020)
  - Total: 41
  - Density: 0.80/sq mi (0.31/km^{2})
- Time zone: UTC-6 (CST)
  - Summer (DST): UTC-5 (CDT)
- Area code: 785
- GNIS feature ID: 471055

Achilles Township is a township in Rawlins County, Kansas, United States. As of the 2020 census, its population was 41.

== History ==
Achilles Township is home to the ghost town of Achilles, whose post office was in operation from 1879 to 1951. The Battle at Sappa Creek took place in the township in 1875. The township and extinct town was named after the father of Armstead Morris, who established the post office, Achilles Morris.

== Geography ==
Achilles Township covers an area of 51.118 square miles (132.40 square kilometers).

=== Adjacent townships ===
Herl Township, Rawlins County
Union Township, Rawlins County	northwest	north	northeast	Sappa Township, Decatur County
		self	east	Bassettville Township, Decatur County
Herl Township, Rawlins County	southwest	south	southeast	Cook Township, Decatur County
Jefferson Township, Rawlins County
