= Jefferson Township, Rawlins County, Kansas =

Township in Rawlins County, Kansas, U.S.

Jefferson Township
- Township
- Location within Rawlins County
- Coordinates: 39.607051°N 100.81221°W
- Country: United States
- State: Kansas
- County: Rawlins

Government
  - District 1 County Commissioner: Alan Solko

Area
  - Total: 47.672 sq mi (123.47 km^{2})
  - Land: 47.655 sq mi (123.43 km^{2})
  - Water: 0.017 sq mi (0.044 km^{2}) 0.04%

Population (2020)
  - Total: 33
  - Density: 0.69/sq mi (0.27/km^{2})
- Time zone: UTC-6 (CST)
  - Summer (DST): UTC-5 (CDT)
- Area code: 785
- GNIS feature ID: 471056

Jefferson Township is a township in Rawlins County, Kansas, United States. As of the 2020 census, its population was 33.

== History ==
The extinct town of Laing was located in Jefferson Township. Its post office was in operation from 1879–1881.

== Geography ==
Jefferson Township covers an area of 47.672 square miles (123.47 square kilometers).

=== Adjacent townships ===
Achilles Township, Rawlins County
		north	northeast	Bassettville Township, Decatur County
Herl Township, Rawlins County	west	self	east	Cook Township, Decatur County
		south
Wendell Township, Thomas County
