= Wendell Township, Kansas =

Township in Thomas County, Kansas, U.S.

Wendell Township
- Township
- Location within Thomas County
- Coordinates: 39.517777°N 100.822472°W
- Country: United States
- State: Kansas
- County: Thomas

Government
  - Trustee: Chase Cersovsky

Area
  - Total: 70.861 sq mi (183.53 km^{2})
  - Land: 70.848 sq mi (183.50 km^{2})
  - Water: 0.013 sq mi (0.034 km^{2}) 0.18%

Population (2020)
  - Total: 48
  - Density: 0.68/sq mi (0.26/km^{2})
- Time zone: UTC-6 (CST)
  - Summer (DST): UTC-5 (CDT)
- Area code: 785
- GNIS feature ID: 471100

Wendell Township is a township in Thomas County, Kansas, United States. As of the 2020 census, its population was 48.

== Geography ==
Wendell Township covers an area of 70.861 square miles (183.53 km^{2}), 0.18% of it water.

=== Adjacent townships ===
Jefferson Township, Rawlins County
Herl Township, Rawlins County	northwest	north	northeast	Cook Township, Decatur County
Rovohl Township, Thomas County	west	self	east	Prairie Dog Township, Sheridan County
Lacey Township, Thomas County	southwest	south	southeast	Bloomfield Township, Sheridan County
Smith Township, Thomas County

== Demographics ==
As of the 2020 census, the township had a population of 48, giving a population density of 0.68 people per square mile (0.26 people/km^{2}). The racial makeup of the township was 93.8% White, 2.1% Native American, and 4.2% from two or more races. Hispanics or Latinos of any race were 4.2% of the population.

The 2020–2024 American Community Survey estimated that the township contained 31 households and 70 housing units.
