= KADT =

KADT may refer to:

- KADT-LD, a low-power television station (channel 16) licensed to Killeen, Texas, United States
- Atwood-Rawlins County City-County Airport (ICAO code KADT)
