= Blakeman =

Blakeman is a surname. Notable people with the surname include:

- Adam Blakeman (1596–1665), English-born American preacher
- Adam Blakeman (footballer) (born 1991), English footballer
- Alec Blakeman (1936–1994), English footballer
- Bruce Blakeman (born 1955), American politician
- Clete Blakeman (born 1964), American National Football League official
- Helen Blakeman (born 1971), English playwright and screenwriter
- Jennifer Blakeman, American musician and music industry executive
- Laura Blakeman (born 1979), British slalom canoeist
- Laurie Blakeman (born 1958), Canadian politician

Fictional characters

- Natasha Blakeman, a character from the UK television ITV soap opera, Coronation Street

== Other uses ==
- Blakeman, Kansas
