= K-117 (Kansas highway) =

State highway in Kansas, U.S.

K-117
- K-117 highlighted in red

Route information
- Maintained by KDOT
- Length: 11.977 mi (19.275 km)
- Existed: May 16, 1937–present

Major junctions
- South end: US-36 in Midway
- North end: N-17 at the Nebraska border near Herndon

Location
- Country: United States
- State: Kansas
- Counties: Rawlins

Highway system
- Kansas State Highway System; Interstate; US; State; Spurs
← K-116	→ K-119

K-117 is an approximately 11.98-mile-long (19.28 km) state highway in the U.S. state of Kansas. K-117's southern terminus is at U.S. Route 36 (US-36) in Midway, which is between Atwood and Oberlin. The highway heads north and passes by Herndon before reaching the Nebraska border, where it continues as Nebraska Highway 17 (N-17). K-117 is a two-lane highway its entire length.

In January 1937, it was approved to add the highway to the State Highway System when the Nebraska Department of Transportation (NDOT) had finished their portion of the highway. K-117 was first designated as a state highway on May 26, 1937, to connect to the new highway that was completed by NDOT. K-117's alignment has not changed since it was designated. At times, sections of the highway have had to be closed due to flooding from Beaver Creek.

== Route description ==
K-117 begins at an intersection with US-36 in the unincorporated community of Midway and begins traveling north. The highway continues through rural farmlands for about two miles (3.2 km) then crosses an unnamed creek. The roadway continues another 1.7 miles (2.7 km) then begins to proceed through rolling hills. The highway passes by an electrical substation and a large fuel pumping station, then approximately one mile (1.6 km) later crosses over Beaver Creek, as the landscape flattens out. The roadway continues through flat farmland for about .4 miles (0.64 km) then reaches an at-grade crossing with a BNSF Railway track. The highway continues north along the east side of the city of Herndon and after about .6 miles (0.97 km) intersects County Route 314 (CR-314), which connects to Herndon. K-117 advances north through rural farmland for about six miles (9.7 km) and reaches the Nebraska border where it continues as Nebraska Highway 17 (N-17).

The Kansas Department of Transportation (KDOT) tracks the traffic levels on its highways, and in 2017, they determined that on average the traffic varied from 215 vehicles per day slightly north of Herndon to 265 vehicles per day south of Herndon. K-117 isn't included in or connected to the National Highway System. (Note: The National Highway System is a system of highways important to the nation's defense, economy, and mobility.)

== History ==
In the early 1930s, the Nebraska Department of Transportation (NDOT) began to build a new state highway from US-6 in Culbertson, Nebraska, southward to the Kansas border north of Herndon. In a meeting on January 6, 1937, the Kansas State Highway Commission approved that when Nebraska completes the highway to the state line, that Kansas would add their proposed highway from US-36 northward to the state border to connect to the new highway. By the meeting on March 20, 1937, the Kansas State Highway Commission received a letter from Nebraska, stating that they had completed their section of the highway. Then in a resolution passed on May 26, 1937, the Kansas State Highway Commission added the highway to the state highway system as K-117. The section of K-117 between US-36 and Herndon was graveled by 1940, with the remaining section north of there being graveled by 1941. The entire road was paved by 1952. K-117's alignment has not been changed since it was commissioned.

In June 1951, a section of K-117 just south of Herndon was closed due to high water covering the highway. In 1954, a 2.5-mile (4.0 km) section was closed south of Herndon, for the building of a new bridge and grading. On June 28, 1989, roughly 9 inches (23 cm) of rain fell over neighboring Sherman and Cheyenne counties. KDOT had to close a 0.5-mile (0.80 km) section of K-117 by Herndon due to high water from the Beaver River flooding. In June 2002, a tornado knocked down powerlines along the highway between Ludell and Herndon, also 2-inch (5.1 cm) sized hail fell on the highway around Herndon.

== Major intersections ==
The entire route is in Rawlins County.

Location	mi	km	Destinations	Notes
Midway	0.000	0.000	US-36 – Oberlin, Atwood	Southern terminus
Richland Township	11.977	19.275	N-17 north – Culbertson	Continuation at the Nebraska border
1.000 mi = 1.609 km; 1.000 km = 0.621 mi
