= Ludell Township, Kansas =

Township in Rawlins County, Kansas, U.S.

Ludell Township
- Township
- Location within Rawlins County
- Coordinates: 39.867392°N 100.938658°W
- Country: United States
- State: Kansas
- County: Rawlins

Government
  - District 1 County Commissioner: Alan Solko

Area
  - Total: 35.333 sq mi (91.51 km^{2})
  - Land: 35.329 sq mi (91.50 km^{2})
  - Water: 0.004 sq mi (0.010 km^{2}) 0.01%

Population (2020)
  - Total: 91
  - Density: 2.6/sq mi (0.99/km^{2})
- Time zone: UTC-6 (CST)
  - Summer (DST): UTC-5 (CDT)
- Area code: 785
- GNIS feature ID: 470910

Ludell Township is a township in Rawlins County, Kansas, United States. As of the 2020 census, its population was 91.

== Geography ==
Ludell Township covers an area of 35.333 square miles (91.51 square kilometers).

=== Communities ===
- Ludell

=== Adjacent townships ===
Driftwood Township, Rawlins County	northwest		northeast	Herl Township, Rawlins County
		self
Center Township, Rawlins County	southwest	south
Union Township, Rawlins County
