= Burntwood (disambiguation) =

Burntwood is a town and civil parish in Lichfield District in Staffordshire, England,

Burntwood may also refer to:

- Burntwood, Kansas, small settlement in Rawlins County, Kansas, United States
- Burntwood River, river in Canada
