= 1930 All-Pro Team =

Official list of the best NFL players in 1930

The 1930 All-Pro Team consisted of American football players chosen by various selectors for the All-Pro team of the National Football League (NFL) for the 1930 NFL season. Teams were selected by, among others, the Green Bay Press-Gazette (GB), based on the returns of ballots sent to the league's coaches, club officials, sports writers and officials, and Collyer's Eye (CE).

== Team ==
Position	Player	Team	Selector(s)
Quarterback	Benny Friedman	New York Giants	GB-1, CE-1
Quarterback	Red Dunn	Green Bay Packers	GB-2, CE-2
Quarterback	Carl Brumbaugh	Chicago Bears	GB-3
Halfback	Red Grange	Chicago Bears	GB-1, CE-1
Halfback	Ken Strong	Staten Island Stapletons	GB-1, CE-1
Halfback	Stumpy Thomason	Brooklyn Dodgers	GB-2
Halfback	Father Lumpkin	Portsmouth Spartans	GB-2
Halfback	Johnny Blood	Green Bay Packers	GB-3, CE-2
Halfback	Bill Glassgow	Portsmouth Spartans	CE-2
Halfback	Chuck Bennett	Portsmouth Spartans	GB-3
Fullback	Ernie Nevers	Chicago Cardinals	GB-1, CE-1
Fullback	Bronko Nagurski	Chicago Bears	GB-2, CE-2
Fullback	Jack McBride	Brooklyn Dodgers	GB-3
End	LaVern Dilweg	Green Bay Packers	GB-1, CE-1
End	Luke Johnsos	Chicago Bears	GB-1, CE-1
End	Tom Nash	Green Bay Packers	GB-2, CE-2
End	Chuck Kassel	Chicago Cardinals	GB-3, CE-2
End	Red Badgro	New York Giants	GB-2
End	Tony Kostos	Minneapolis Red Jackets; Frankford Yellow Jackets	GB-3
Tackle	Jap Douds	Portsmouth Spartans	GB-1
Tackle	Bill Owen	New York Giants	CE-1
Tackle	Link Lyman	Chicago Bears	GB-1, CE-1
Tackle	Jim Mooney	Brooklyn Dodgers	GB-2
Tackle	Duke Slater	Chicago Cardinals	GB-3, CE-2
Tackle	Bill Kern	Green Bay Packers	GB-2
Tackle	Cal Hubbard	Green Bay Packers	GB-3
Guard	Mike Michalske	Green Bay Packers	GB-1, CE-1
Guard	Walt Kiesling	Chicago Cardinals	GB-1, CE-1
Guard	Hal Hanson	Frankford Yellow Jackets	GB-2
Guard	Rudy Comstock	New York Giants	GB-2
Guard	Zuck Carlson	Chicago Bears	CE-2
Guard	George Gibson	Frankford Yellow Jackets; Minneapolis Red Jackets	CE-2
Guard	Al Graham	Portsmouth Spartans; Providence Steam Roller	GB-3
Guard	Les Caywood	New York Giants	GB-3
Center	Swede Hagberg	Brooklyn Dodgers	GB-1
Center	Nate Barragar	Minneapolis Red Jackets; Frankford Yellow Jackets	GB-3, CE-1
Center	Joe Wostoupal	New York Giants	GB-2, CE-2
