= K117 =

K117 or K-117 may refer to:

- K-117 (Kansas highway), a state highway in Kansas
- Russian submarine Bryansk (K-117), a Russian submarine
