= Union Township, Rawlins County, Kansas =

Township in Rawlins County, Kansas, U.S.

Union Township
- Township
- Location within Rawlins County
- Coordinates: 39.774413°N 100.910589°W
- Country: United States
- State: Kansas
- County: Rawlins

Government
  - District 1 County Commissioner: Alan Solko

Area
  - Total: 43.04 sq mi (111.5 km^{2})
  - Land: 43.04 sq mi (111.5 km^{2})
  - Water: 0 sq mi (0 km^{2}) 0%

Population (2020)
  - Total: 27
  - Density: 0.63/sq mi (0.24/km^{2})
- Time zone: UTC-6 (CST)
  - Summer (DST): UTC-5 (CDT)
- Area code: 785
- GNIS feature ID: 470999

Union Township is a township in Rawlins County, Kansas, United States. As of the 2020 census, its population was 27.

== Geography ==
Union Township covers an area of 43.04 square miles (111.5 square kilometers).

=== Adjacent townships ===
Ludell Township, Rawlins County
		north	northeast	Herl Township, Rawlins County
Center Township, Rawlins County	west	self
		south	southeast	Achilles Township, Rawlins County
Herl Township, Rawlins County

== Transportation ==
=== Major highways ===
- US-36
