= Rotate (disambiguation) =

Rotate is to move an object around an axis.

It may also refer to:

- "Rotate", a song
- Rotate, Kansas, a ghost town
