= Nebraska Highway 17 =

State highway in Nebraska, U.S.

State Highway 17

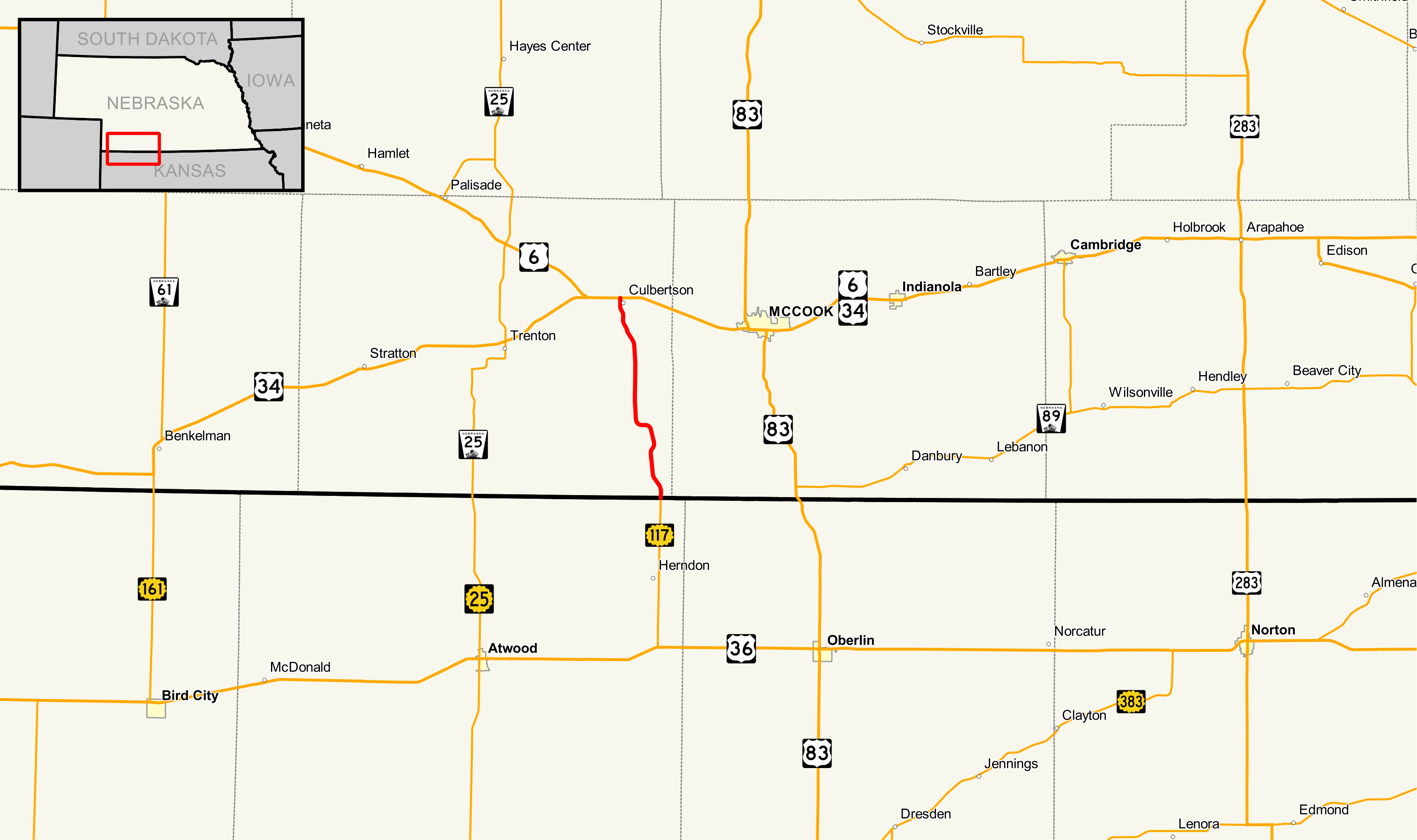
- Nebraska Highway 17 highlighted in red

Route information
- Maintained by NDOT
- Length: 17.43 mi (28.05 km)
- Existed: 1936–present

Major junctions
- South end: K-117 at the Kansas border near Herndon, KS
- North end: US 6 / US 34 in Culbertson

Location
- Country: United States
- State: Nebraska
- Counties: Hitchcock

Highway system
- Nebraska State Highway System; Interstate; US; State; Link; Spur; State Spurs; Recreation
← N-16	→ N-18

Nebraska Highway 17 is a highway in southwestern Nebraska. It has a southern terminus at the Kansas border south of Culbertson and a northern terminus in Culbertson at an intersection with U.S. Highway 6 and U.S. Highway 34. The highway extends into Kansas at its southern terminus via K-117.

== Route description ==
Nebraska Highway 17 begins at the Kansas state border, continuing from K-117. It heads northward with some slight turns along the way. There are no major intersections along its route. It continues northward into Culbertson where it ends at an intersection with US 6 and US 34.

== Major intersections ==
The entire route is in Hitchcock County.

Location	mi	km	Destinations	Notes
	0.00	0.00	K-117 south	Continuation into Kansas
Culbertson	17.43	28.05	US 6 / US 34	Northern terminus
1.000 mi = 1.609 km; 1.000 km = 0.621 mi
