= Uhlaender =

Uhlaender is a surname. Notable people with the surname include:

- Katie Uhlaender (born 1984), American skeleton racer
- Ted Uhlaender (1939–2009), American baseball player
