= Achilles, Kansas =

Ghost town in Rawlins County, Kansas

- Ghost town
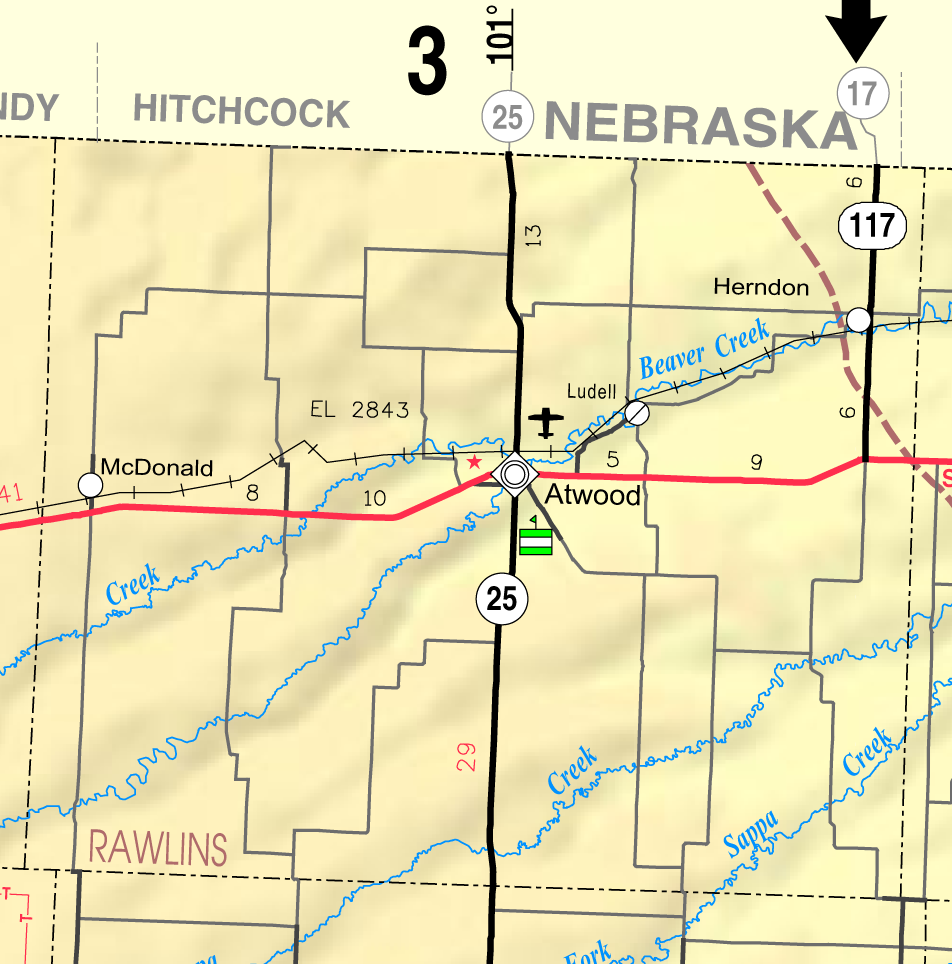
- KDOT map of Rawlins County (legend)

- Location within Kansas Location within the United States
- Coordinates: 39°42′43″N 100°50′11″W
- Country: United States
- State: Kansas
- County: Rawlins
- Elevation: 2,844 ft (867 m)

Population
  - Total: 0
- Time zone: UTC-6 (CST)
  - Summer (DST): UTC-5 (CDT)
- Area code: 785
- GNIS ID: 484547

Achilles (/əˈtʃɪləs/ ə-CHIL-əs) is a ghost town in Rawlins County, Kansas, United States, on Sappa Creek, about fifteen miles southeast of Atwood.

== History ==
Its heyday began in the 1870s and ended in roughly 1915 when the railroad bypassed Achilles and with more use of the automobile, Achilles declined. Most of the businesses were defunct by the mid- to late-1930s. There was a legendary incident on April 24, 1875, referred to as the "battle of Achilles" that was a fight between a band of 20 hunters and some Indians at a water hole about five miles south of the village.

A post office was opened in Achilles in 1879, and remained in operation until it was discontinued in 1951. The money order post office was connected by stage at one point with Colby, where it received a daily mail. The population was 70 in 1910, and was a principal trading point in the southwestern part of the county.

Over the years business in Achilles supported two general stores, including Hill General Store; a variety store; a blacksmith shop; a barbershop; a mechanics garage; and a creamery. These were lined along Main Street. These buildings are all gone. The blacksmith shop burned in 1922, and the hardware store was moved into Atwood and is used now for an antique shop. Several buildings were either moved or the wood was sold from the buildings. In about 1999 the last skeletal frame of a general store was burned, erasing all signs of Main Street. Now "Main Street" is part family garden, crop field, weeds, and overgrowth.

There were two houses actually in Achilles: Pearl (Hill) and Frank Bacon home and the Fields house. The Fields house remains; the Bacon home was moved. Off of Main Street stood a Methodist church, later moved to Atwood and used for a home. Also off Main Street stood the Achilles one-room schoolhouse, which is still standing and used for community events. Nearby Achilles Cemetery acknowledges many of the pioneers who settled the area.

In 1993 Achilles was still marked on Kansas State maps, but by 2001 it was no longer acknowledged on newly published maps.

== Geography ==
=== Climate ===
Climate data for Achilles, Kansas
Month	Jan	Feb	Mar	Apr	May	Jun	Jul	Aug	Sep	Oct	Nov	Dec	Year
Mean daily maximum °F (°C)	43.2 (6.2)	40.3 (4.6)	57.5 (14.2)	66.2 (19.0)	74.9 (23.8)	82.7 (28.2)	91.8 (33.2)	91.2 (32.9)	80.8 (27.1)	73.4 (23.0)	58.6 (14.8)	46.0 (7.8)	67.2 (19.6)
Mean daily minimum °F (°C)	11.5 (−11.4)	9.2 (−12.7)	24.5 (−4.2)	34.2 (1.2)	44.5 (6.9)	53.5 (11.9)	58.6 (14.8)	57.2 (14.0)	44.9 (7.2)	36.1 (2.3)	22.3 (−5.4)	13.2 (−10.4)	34.1 (1.2)
Average precipitation inches (mm)	0.4 (10)	0.7 (18)	1.0 (25)	1.8 (46)	3.0 (76)	3.0 (76)	3.1 (79)	2.5 (64)	1.9 (48)	1.0 (25)	0.4 (10)	0.5 (13)	19.2 (490)
Source: Weatherbase
