= Rocewood Township, Kansas =

Township in Rawlins County, Kansas, U.S.

Rocewood Township
- Township
- Location within Rawlins County
- Coordinates: 39.821848°N 101.319057°W
- Country: United States
- State: Kansas
- County: Rawlins

Government
  - District 3 County Commissioner: Lincoln Pochop

Area
  - Total: 286.47 sq mi (742.0 km^{2})
  - Land: 286.443 sq mi (741.88 km^{2})
  - Water: 0.027 sq mi (0.070 km^{2}) 0.01%

Population (2020)
  - Total: 311
  - Density: 1.09/sq mi (0.419/km^{2})
- Time zone: UTC-6 (CST)
  - Summer (DST): UTC-5 (CDT)
- Area code: 785
- GNIS feature ID: 1729738

Rocewood Township is a township in Rawlins County, Kansas, United States. As of the 2020 census, its population was 311.

== Geography ==
Rocewood Township covers an area of 286.47 square miles (742 square kilometers).

=== Communities ===
- McDonald

=== Adjacent townships ===
Hitchcock County, Nebraska
Dundy County, Nebraska	northwest	north	northeast	Driftwood Township, Rawlins County
Bird City Township, Cheyenne County	west	self	east	Center Township, Rawlins County
Llanos Township, Sherman County	southwest	south	southeast	Mirage Township, Rawlins County
Barrett Township, Thomas County

== Transportation ==
=== Major highways ===
- US-36
