= Center Township, Rawlins County, Kansas =

Township in Rawlins County, Kansas, U.S.

Center Township
- Township
- Location within Rawlins County
- Coordinates: 39.726405°N 101.119678°W
- Country: United States
- State: Kansas
- County: Rawlins

Government
  - Districts 2 and 3 County Commissioners: Mark Mosley and Lincoln Pochop

Area
  - Total: 266.316 sq mi (689.76 km^{2})
  - Land: 266.303 sq mi (689.72 km^{2})
  - Water: 0.013 sq mi (0.034 km^{2}) 0%

Population (2020)
  - Total: 308
  - Density: 1.16/sq mi (0.447/km^{2})
- Time zone: UTC-6 (CST)
  - Summer (DST): UTC-5 (CDT)
- Area code: 785
- GNIS feature ID: 471053

Center Township is a township in Rawlins County, Kansas, United States. As of the 2020 census, its population was 308.

== Geography ==
Center Township covers an area of 266.316 square miles (689.76 square kilometers).

=== Adjacent townships ===
Driftwood Township, Rawlins County
Rocewood Township, Rawlins County	northwest	north	northeast	Ludell Township, Rawlins County
Mirage Township, Rawlins County	west	self	east	Union Township, Rawlins County
Barrett Township, Thomas County	southwest	south	southeast	Herl Township, Rawlins County
Rovohl Township, Thomas County

The township also completely surrounds Atwood Township, Rawlins County.

== Transportation ==
=== Major highways ===
- US-36
- K-25
