= Greshamton, Kansas =

Ghost town in Rawlins County, Kansas

- Ghost town
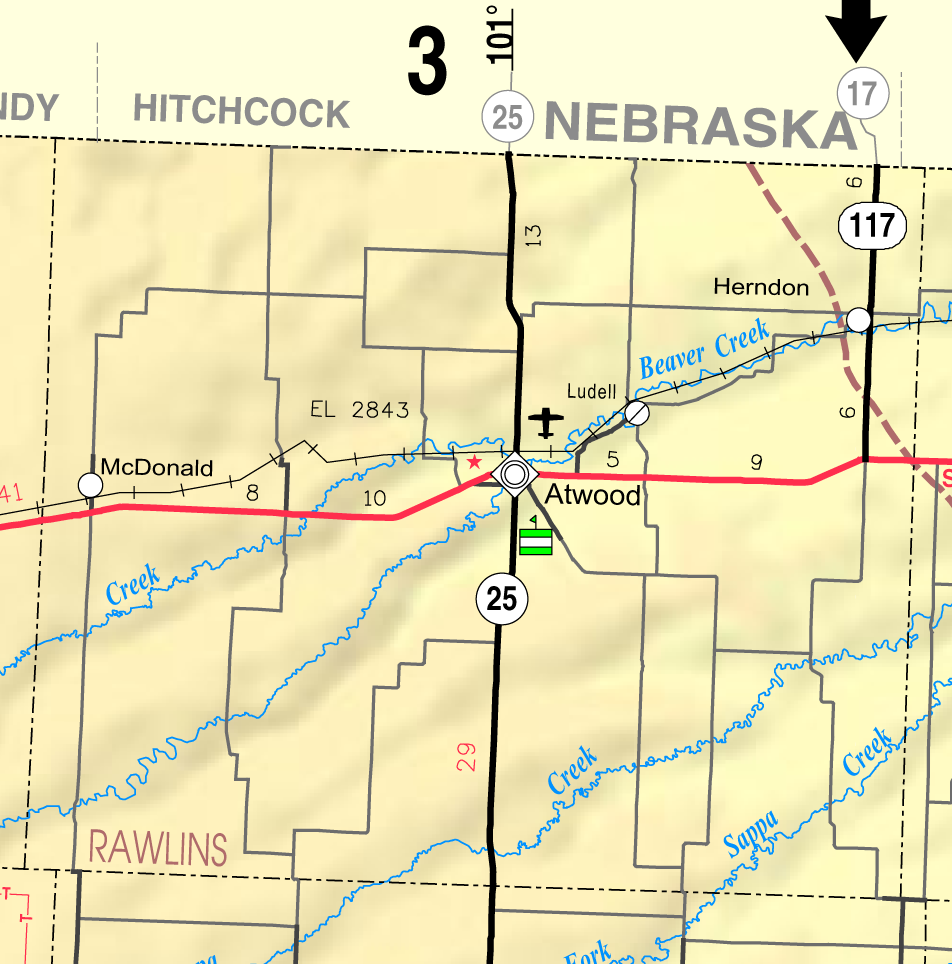
- KDOT map of Rawlins County (legend)

- Location within Kansas Location within the United States
- Coordinates: 39°47′35″N 101°13′22″W
- Country: United States
- State: Kansas
- County: Rawlins
- Elevation: 3,110 ft (950 m)

Population
  - Total: 0
- Time zone: UTC-6 (CST)
  - Summer (DST): UTC-5 (CDT)
- Area code: 785
- GNIS ID: 482484

Greshamton is a ghost town in Rawlins County, Kansas, United States.

== History ==
Greshamton was issued a post office in 1883. The post office was moved to Beardsley in 1889.
