= Herl Township, Kansas =

Township in Rawlins County, Kansas, U.S.

Herl Township
- Township
- Location within Rawlins County
- Coordinates: 39.860186°N 100.838071°W
- Country: United States
- State: Kansas
- County: Rawlins

Government
  - District 1 County Commissioner: Alan Solko

Area
  - Total: 189.524 sq mi (490.86 km^{2})
  - Land: 189.511 sq mi (490.83 km^{2})
  - Water: 0.013 sq mi (0.034 km^{2}) 0.01%

Population (2020)
  - Total: 284
  - Density: 1.50/sq mi (0.579/km^{2})
- Time zone: UTC-6 (CST)
  - Summer (DST): UTC-5 (CDT)
- Area code: 785
- GNIS feature ID: 470911

Herl Township is a township in Rawlins County, Kansas, United States. As of the 2020 census, its population was 284.

== Geography ==
Herl Township covers an area of 189.524 square miles (490.86 square kilometers). The township is unique in shape as it has an exclave.

=== Communities ===
- Herndon

=== Adjacent townships ===
Hitchcock County, Nebraska
Driftwood Township, Rawlins County	northwest	north	northeast	Red Willow County, Nebraska; Finley Township, Decatur County
Ludell Township, Rawlins County	west	self	east	Logan Township, Decatur County
Union Township, Rawlins County	southwest	south	southeast	Sappa Township, Decatur County; Bassettville Township, Decatur County
Achilles Township, Rawlins County

== Transportation ==
=== Major highways ===
- US-36
- K-117
