= Link Lyman =

American football player and coach (1898–1972)

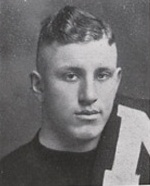

No. 14, 2, 77, 12, 11
- Position: Tackle

Personal information
- Born: November 30, 1898; Table Rock, Nebraska, U.S.
- Died: December 28, 1972 (aged 74); Barstow, California, U.S.
- Listed height: 6 ft 2 in (1.88 m)
- Listed weight: 233 lb (106 kg)

Career information
- High school: McDonald (McDonald, Kansas)
- College: Nebraska

Career history

Playing
- Canton Bulldogs (1922–1923); Cleveland Bulldogs (1924); Canton Bulldogs (1925); Frankford Yellow Jackets (1925); Chicago Bears (1926–1928, 1930–1931, 1933–1934)

Coaching
- Nebraska (1934–1941) Offensive Line coach; Creighton (1942) Offensive Line coach

Awards and highlights
- 4× NFL champion (1922-1924, 1933); 2× First-team All-Pro (1930, 1934); 3× Second-team All-Pro (1924, 1928, 1931); 100 greatest Bears of All-Time
- Stats at Pro Football Reference
- Pro Football Hall of Fame

William Roy "Link" Lyman (November 30, 1898 – December 28, 1972), also sometimes known as Roy Lyman, was an American professional football player.

Lyman was born in Nebraska and raised in Kansas. He played college football for the Nebraska Cornhuskers football team in 1918, 1919, and 1921. He played professional football as a tackle in the National Football League (NFL) for the Canton/Cleveland Bulldogs (1922–1925), the Frankford Yellow Jackets (1925), and the Chicago Bears (1926–1928, 1930–1932, and 1933–1934). He won four NFL championships (1922, 1923, and 1924 with the Bulldogs and 1933 with the Bears) and was selected five times as a first-team All-Pro player (1923, 1924, 1925, 1930, and 1934).

Lyman was an assistant football coach at Nebraska from 1935 to 1941 and at Creighton University in 1942. He later had a career in the insurance business. He was inducted into the Pro Football Hall of Fame in 1964. He died in an automobile crash in 1972 while driving to Las Vegas.

== Early life ==
Lyman was born in 1898 in Table Rock, Nebraska. As an infant, his family moved to Rawlins County, Kansas, where his father, Edwin Lyman, was a farmer, raised stock and engaged in the real estate business. Lyman had four younger brothers (Edwin, Richard, Albert, and Louis) and three younger sisters (Anna, Margret, and Mildred).

Lyman attended high school in McDonald, Kansas, but he did not play football as there was no team with only "six or seven boys in the whole school".

== College career ==
Lyman enrolled at the University of Nebraska in 1917 where he was a member of the Sigma Alpha Epsilon fraternity. After playing freshman football in 1917, he played at the tackle position for the Nebraska Cornhuskers football team in 1918, 1919, and 1921. Lyman was married shortly after the end of the 1919 football season and did not return to the university in the fall of 1920. He returned in February 1921 to establish his eligibility to play in the fall of 1921.

Lyman later recalled: "From the first day, I just loved the game, and we had some pretty good teams, too." The 1921 Nebraska team compiled a 7–1 record, lost a close game against Knute Rockne's Notre Dame team, outscored opponents by a combined total of 283 to 17, and won the Missouri Valley Conference championship. The 1922 Nebraska yearbook noted the following about Lyman: "Lyman was, without doubt, our fastest lineman. Roy is a big man, weighing 200 pounds, and could get down under punts almost as quickly as the ends. Roy proved to be a ground gainer on tackle-around plays before the season was over."

== Professional football ==
=== Canton/Cleveland Bulldogs ===
In September 1922, Lyman left Lincoln, Nebraska, to play professional football for the Canton Bulldogs. The Bulldogs were coached by Guy Chamberlin, an All-American out of Nebraska, who invited Lyman to join the team. With Lyman and Pete Henry as its star tackles, the 1922 Canton Bulldogs compiled a 10–0–2 record, shut out nine of twelve opponents, outscored all opponents 184 to 15, and won the NFL championship.

Lyman returned to the Bulldogs the following year. The 1923 team had another undefeated season (11–0–1), shut out eight of twelve opponents, outscored all opponents by a combined total of 246 to 19, and won its second consecutive NFL championship. After the season, Lyman was selected as a first-team All-Pro player by the Canton Daily News and a second-team All-Pro by Collyer's Eye magazine.

In August 1924, Cleveland jeweler Samuel Deutsch bought the Canton Bulldogs and moved the team to Cleveland where they became the Cleveland Bulldogs during the 1924 NFL season. The Bulldogs compiled a 7–1–1 record, outscored opponents by a total of 229 to 60, and won their third consecutive NFL championship. After the 1924 season, Lyman was selected as a first-team All-Pro by Collyer's Eye and a second-team All-Pro by the Green Bay Press-Gazette.

In July 1925, Lyman and four of his teammates (Pete Henry, Rudy Comstock, Ben Jones, and Harry Robb) bought the team for $3,500 and moved it back to Canton. Lyman played seven games for the 1925 Bulldogs and then finished the season playing four games for the Frankford Yellow Jackets. Lyman was reunited with Guy Chamberlain who was then Frankford's head coach. After the 1925 season, Lyman was selected as a first-team All-Pro on the team selected by NFL Commissioner Joseph Carr; he was also selected as a second-team All-Pro by Collyer's Eye.

=== Chicago Bears ===
In December 1925, Lyman joined the Chicago Bears and took part in a winter barnstorming tour that featured football player Red Grange. He joined the Bears again in the fall of 1926. The 1926 Bears team featured five players who were later inducted into the Pro Football Hall of Fame (Lyman, Paddy Driscoll, George Halas, Ed Healey, and George Trafton), posted a 12–1–3 record, and finished second in the NFL.

Lyman remained with the Bears for the 1927 and 1928 seasons. He retired after the 1928 season but returned to the Bears in the fall of 1930. The 1930 Bears compiled a 9–4–1 and finished third in the NFL. Lyman was selected as a first-team All-Pro by Collyer's Eye magazine and the Green Bay Press-Gazette.

Lyman again retired from playing football after the 1931 season. During his two retirements from the Bears, Lyman played semipro ball in Texas and worked in the ranching business.

Lyman returned to the Bears in 1933. The 1933 Bears featured six future Pro Football Hall of Fame players (Lyman, Bronko Nagurski, Red Grange, George Musso, and George Trafton), and posted a 10–2–1 record, winning a place in the NFL's first ever Championship play-off. Lyman started at left tackle for Chicago in that game, with the Bears emerging victorious over the New York Giants, 23–21.

Lyman played his final year of professional football as a member of the 1934 Bears team that compiled a perfect 13–0 record in the regular season and won the NFL Western Division championship, but lost to the Giants in the 1934 NFL Championship Game. After the 1934 season, Lyman was selected as a first-team All-Pro by the United Press, Green Bay Press-Gazette, and Collyer's Eye. Bears' coach George Halas later observed that Lyman was "stronger and tougher during his last two seasons than when he first joined the team eight years earlier."

=== Shifting on defense ===
Lyman was a pioneer in the use of shifting maneuvers to disrupt the blocking assignments of offensive linemen. According to his biography at the Pro Football Hall of Fame, "the constant shifting by defensive players before each play in modern professional football can be traced back to Lyman, who regularly resorted to similar ploys. His sliding, shifting style of defensive line play confused his opponents and made him one of the most respected players of his time. Lyman explained that the idea of shifting was an instinctive move to fool a blocker. He had a unique ability to diagnose a play and many times he would make his move just as the ball was snapped."

Steve Owen, who played with Lyman in 1925 and later served as coach of the Giants, recalled: "Link was the first lineman I ever saw who moved from the assigned defensive position before the ball was snapped. It was difficult to play against him because he would vary his moves and no matter how you reacted, you could be wrong."

=== Career accomplishments and honors ===
Lyman received many honors for his contributions to the game, including being inducted into the Helms Foundation major league football Hall of Fame (January 1961) and the Nebraska Sports Hall of Fame and receiving the University of Nebraska's Distinguished Alumni Award in June 1961. His greatest honor came in February 1964 when he was elected to the Pro Football Hall of Fame as part of the second class of inductees.

During his 11 years in the NFL, Lyman won four NFL championships and never had a losing season. (In 1929, following Lyman's first retirement, the Bears posted a 4–9–2 record.) He was selected five times as a first-team All-Pro and appeared in 133 official NFL games. He was known as one of the true "iron men" of iron man era. Counting unofficial games, he appeared in a total of 286 professional games and played 211-1/2 hours in those games. At the time of his retirement and for many years thereafter, he held the NFL records for games and playing time logged.

== Coaching career ==
In December 1934, Lyman was hired as an assistant football coach under Dana X. Bible with the Nebraska Cornhuskers. He was the line coach at Nebraska from 1935 to 1941 under coaches Bible and Biff Jones. During his seven years as line coach at Nebraska, he was the position coach for All-American linemen Bernie Scherer, Fred Shirey, Elmer Dohmann, Ted Doyle, Charley Brock, Forrest Behm and Warren Alfson. In December 1941, the Nebraska Athletic Board voted not to renew Lyman as the football team's line coach. In 1942, he served as the line coach for the Creighton Bluejays football.

== Family and later years ==
Lyman was married in June 1920 to Grace "Dolly" Godwin (1901–1967). They had two daughters, Joanne and Ardis Mary. In 1942, Lyman accepted a job with the Equitable Life Assurance Society. He became an agency manager for the company in San Antonio, Texas, in 1948. Through the 1950s and 1960s, he worked as an insurance executive in Los Angeles.

His wife died in 1967 at a hospital in Pasadena, California. After his wife's death, Lyman lived with his daughter in San Gabriel, California.

Lyman died in 1972 at age 74 in an automobile crash. He was driving to Las Vegas on I-15 when his automobile crashed into the back of a semi-trailer truck 12 miles south of Baker. He was dead upon arrival at the Barstow Community Hospital. Lyman was buried at the Rose Hills Memorial Park in Whittier, California.
