= Mirage Township, Kansas =

Township in Rawlins County, Kansas, U.S.

Mirage Township
- Township
- Location within Rawlins County
- Coordinates: 39.654999°N 101.243636°W
- Country: United States
- State: Kansas
- County: Rawlins

Government
  - District 3 County Commissioner: Lincoln Pochop

Area
  - Total: 71.449 sq mi (185.05 km^{2})
  - Land: 71.449 sq mi (185.05 km^{2})
  - Water: 0 sq mi (0 km^{2}) 0%

Population (2020)
  - Total: 55
  - Density: 0.77/sq mi (0.30/km^{2})
- Time zone: UTC-6 (CST)
  - Summer (DST): UTC-5 (CDT)
- Area code: 785
- GNIS feature ID: 471051

Mirage Township is a township in Rawlins County, Kansas, United States. As of the 2020 census, its population was 55.

== Geography ==
Mirage Township covers an area of 71.449 square miles (185.05 square kilometers).

=== Adjacent townships ===
Rocewood Township, Rawlins County	northwest
		self	east	Center Township, Rawlins County
		south
Barrett Township, Thomas County
