= Chardon, Kansas =

Ghost town in Rawlins County, Kansas

Coordinates: 39°39′17″N 101°03′26″W

Chardon is a ghost town in Rawlins County, Kansas, United States.

== History ==
A post office was opened in Chardon in the 1880s, and remained in operation until being discontinued in 1939.
