= Ludell, Kansas =

Unincorporated community in Rawlins County, Kansas

- Unincorporated community and CDP
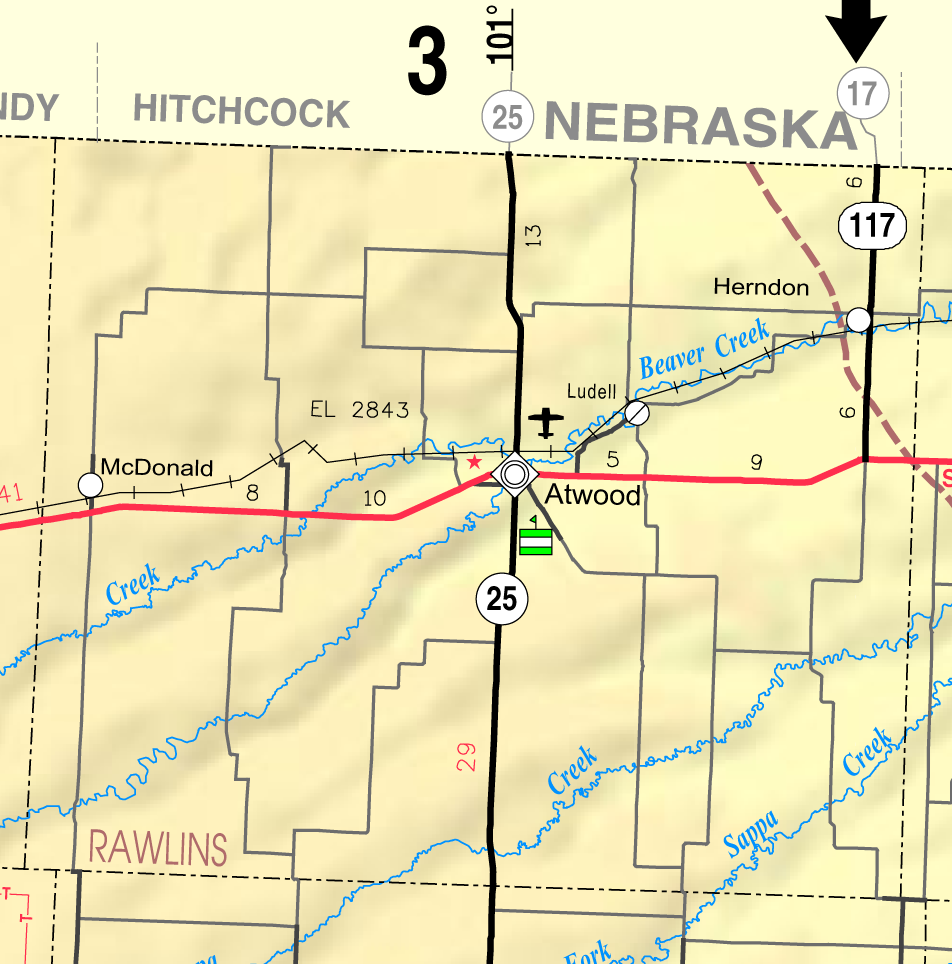
- KDOT map of Rawlins County (legend)

- Location within Kansas Location within the United States
- Coordinates: 39°51′20″N 100°57′36″W
- Country: United States
- State: Kansas
- County: Rawlins
- Elevation: 2,782 ft (848 m)

Population (2020)
  - Total: 41
- Time zone: UTC-6 (CST)
  - Summer (DST): UTC-5 (CDT)
- ZIP Code: 67744
- Area code: 785
- FIPS code: 20-43175
- GNIS ID: 470997

Ludell is an unincorporated community and census-designated place (CDP) in Rawlins County, Kansas, United States. As of the 2020 census, the population was 41. It is 5.5 miles (8.9 km) northeast of Atwood.

== History ==
Ludell had a post office with ZIP Code 67744. The first post office in Ludell was established in 1876. From the years 1876 until 1881, the post office was called either Danube, Kelso, or Prag for some time.

== Demographics ==
Historical population
Census	Pop.	Note	%±
2020	41		—
U.S. Decennial Census

The 2020 United States census counted 41 people, 15 households, and 9 families in Ludell. The population density was 108.8 per square mile (42.0/km^{2}). There were 31 housing units at an average density of 82.2 per square mile (31.7/km^{2}). The racial makeup was 92.68% (38) white or European American (92.68% non-Hispanic white), 0.0% (0) black or African-American, 0.0% (0) Native American or Alaska Native, 0.0% (0) Asian, 0.0% (0) Pacific Islander or Native Hawaiian, 2.44% (1) from other races, and 4.88% (2) from two or more races. Hispanic or Latino of any race was 2.44% (1) of the population.

Of the 15 households, 20.0% had children under the age of 18; 46.7% were married couples living together; 6.7% had a female householder with no spouse or partner present. 40.0% of households consisted of individuals and 20.0% had someone living alone who was 65 years of age or older. The average household size was 2.1 and the average family size was 2.1.

34.1% of the population was under the age of 18, 2.4% from 18 to 24, 22.0% from 25 to 44, 19.5% from 45 to 64, and 22.0% who were 65 years of age or older. The median age was 36.8 years. For every 100 females, there were 70.8 males. For every 100 females ages 18 and older, there were 80.0 males.

== Education ==
The community is served by Rawlins County USD 105 public school district.
