= Burntwood, Kansas =

Ghost town in Rawlins County, Kansas

- Ghost town
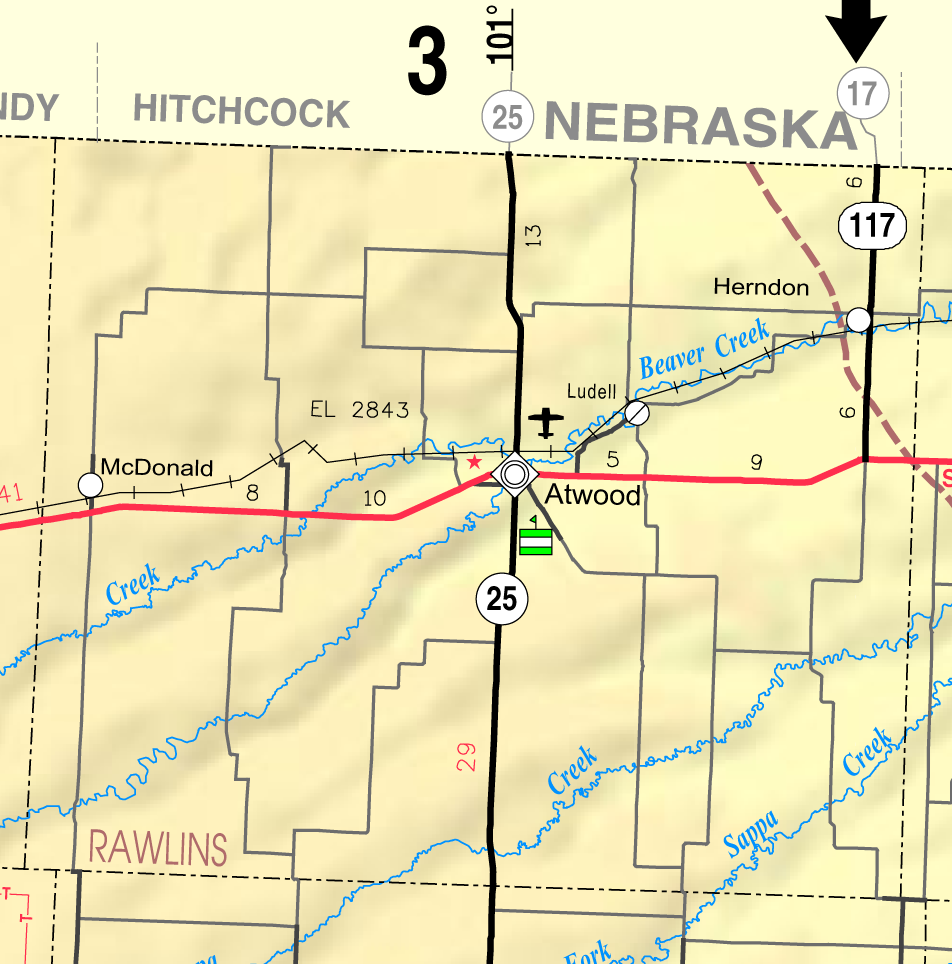
- KDOT map of Rawlins County (legend)

- Location within Kansas Location within the United States
- Coordinates: 39°58′37″N 101°18′00″W
- Country: United States
- State: Kansas
- County: Rawlins
- Elevation: 3,261 ft (994 m)

Population
  - Total: 0
- Time zone: UTC-6 (CST)
  - Summer (DST): UTC-5 (CDT)
- Area code: 785
- GNIS ID: 482481

Burntwood is a ghost town in Rawlins County, Kansas, United States.

== History ==
Burntwood was issued a post office in 1886. The post office was discontinued in 1899, reissued in 1903, then permanently discontinued in 1907.
