= Atwood–Rawlins County City–County Airport =

- IATA: none; ICAO: KADT; FAA LID: ADT

Summary
- Airport type: Public
- Owner: City of Atwood & Rawlins County
- Serves: Rawlins County
- Location: Atwood, Kansas
- Elevation AMSL: 2,991 ft (912 m)
- Coordinates: 39°50′24″N 101°02′31″W
- Interactive map of Atwood–Rawlins County; City–County Airport

Runways
Direction	Length		Surface
Direction	ft	m	Surface
16/34	5,000	1,524	Asphalt
3/21	2,400	732	Turf

Statistics (2006)
- Aircraft operations: 12,300
- Source: Federal Aviation Administration

Atwood–Rawlins County City–County Airport (ICAO: KADT, FAA LID: ADT) is a public airport located two miles (3 km) north of the central business district of Atwood, in Rawlins County, Kansas, United States. It is owned by the City of Atwood & Rawlins County.

Although most U.S. airports use the same three-letter location identifier for the FAA and IATA, Atwood–Rawlins County City–County Airport is assigned ADT by the FAA but has no designation from the IATA.

== Facilities and aircraft ==
Atwood–Rawlins County City–County Airport covers an area of 250 acres (100 ha) which contains two runways: one is asphalt paved (runway 16/34 measuring 5,001 x 75 ft) and one is a turf surface (runway 3/21 at 2,400 x 100 ft). For the 12-month period ending June 9, 2006, the airport had 12,300 aircraft operations, an average of 33 per day: 98% general aviation and 2% air taxi.

== See also ==
- List of airports in Kansas
