= Rawlins County USD 105 =

Public school district in Atwood, Kansas

Address
- 205 N. 4th St. Suite 1 Atwood, Kansas, 67730; United States
- Coordinates: 39°48′32″N 101°2′33″W

District information
- Type: Public
- Grades: K to 12
- Schools: 2

Other information
- Website: usd105.org

Rawlins County USD 105 is a public unified school district headquartered in Atwood, Kansas, United States. The district includes the communities of Atwood, Herndon, Blakeman, Ludell, and nearby rural areas.

== Schools ==
The school district operates the following schools:

- Rawlins County Junior-Senior High School. Its mascot is Buffaloes.
- Rawlins County Elementary School

== History ==
In 1945 (after World War II), the School Reorganization Act in Kansas caused the consolidation of thousands of rural school districts in Kansas.

In 1963, the School Unification Act in Kansas caused the further consolidatation of thousands of tiny school districts into hundreds of larger Unified School Districts.

It was formed in 2003 by the consolidation of Herndon USD 317 and Atwood USD 318.

On June 5, 2023, a fire was intentionally set at the Rawlins County Junior-Senior High School, causing extensive damage and injuring 10 firefighters. Following the fire, an engineer deemed the building unsafe, leading to its demolition, which began on June 10, 2024. Two juveniles were convicted of arson related to the incident. In an August 2024, voters in Rawlins County approved a $29.9 million bond issue and a 1% countywide sales tax to finance the construction of a new K-12 school building and improvements to district facilities. The total project cost is estimated at $39.9 million, with plans to complete the 7-12 grade portion by January 2026.

== See also ==
- Kansas State Department of Education
- Kansas State High School Activities Association
- List of high schools in Kansas
- List of unified school districts in Kansas
