= Tony Kostos =

American football player (1905–1984)

Profile
- Positions: End, center, guard, tackle

Personal information
- Born: June 12, 1905; Mount Carmel, Pennsylvania, U.S.
- Died: November 16, 1984 (aged 79); New Brunswick, New Jersey, U.S.
- Listed height: 5 ft 11 in (1.80 m)
- Listed weight: 191 lb (87 kg)

Career information
- College: Bucknell

Career history
- Frankford Yellow Jackets (1927–1931); Minneapolis Red Jackets (1930)
- Stats at Pro Football Reference

Anthony Joseph Kostos (June 12, 1905 – November 16, 1984) was an American football player. He was born in Mount Carmel, Pennsylvania, in 1905 and attended Mount Carmel High School. He played college football for Bucknell from 1923 to 1925. He later played professional football in the National Football League (NFL) for six years as an end, center, guard, and tackle for the Frankford Yellow Jackets (1927–1931) and Minneapolis Red Jackets (1930). He appeared in 66 NFL games, 47 as a starter. He also played for the Senandoah Presidents, and later worked as a football coach at Albright College. He died in 1984 in New Brunswick, New Jersey.
