= Blakeman, Kansas =

Unincorporated community in Rawlins County, Kansas

Coordinates: 39°49′20″N 101°07′02″W

Blakeman is an unincorporated community in Rawlins County, Kansas, United States. It is located west of Atwood.

== History ==
A post office was opened in Blakeman in 1887, and remained in operation until being discontinued in 1952.

== Education ==
The community is served by Rawlins County USD 105 public school district.
