= McDonald, Kansas =

City in Rawlins County, Kansas

- City
- Location within Rawlins County and Kansas

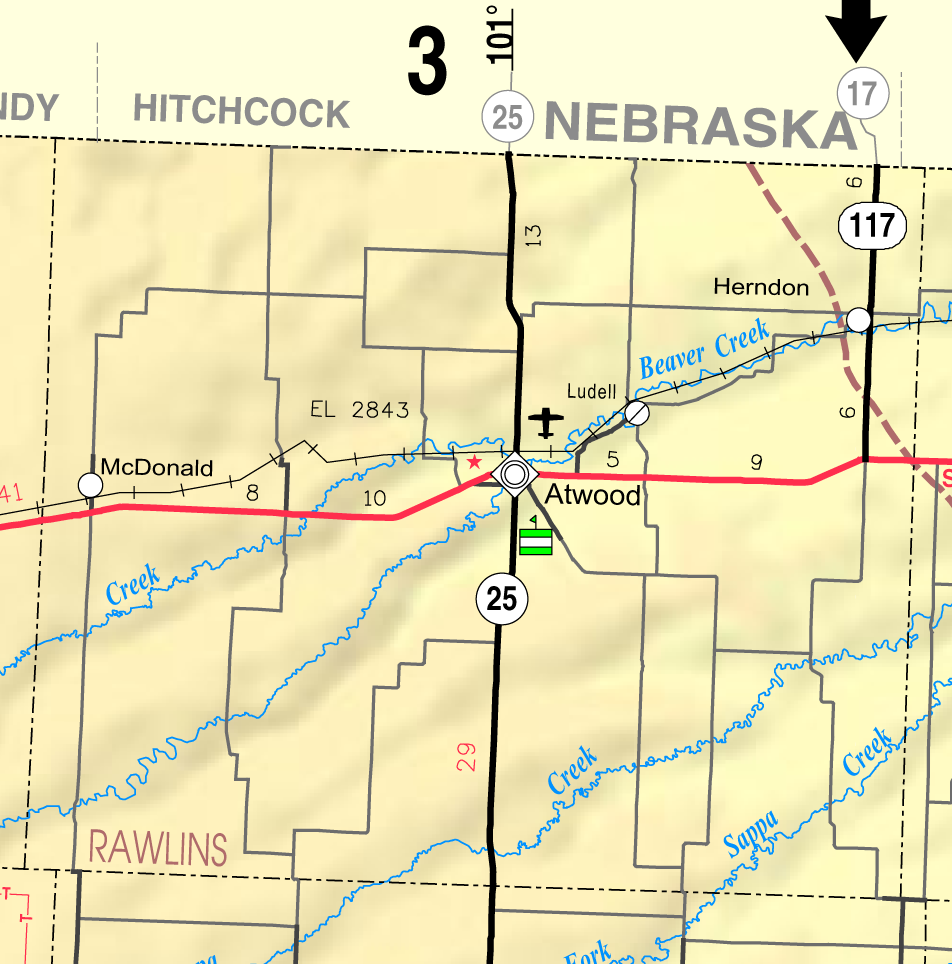
- KDOT map of Rawlins County (legend)
- Coordinates: 39°47′05″N 101°22′14″W
- Country: United States
- State: Kansas
- County: Rawlins
- Founded: 1880s
- Incorporated: 1919
- Named for: Rice McDonald

Area
  - Total: 0.22 sq mi (0.57 km^{2})
  - Land: 0.22 sq mi (0.57 km^{2})
  - Water: 0 sq mi (0.00 km^{2})
- Elevation: 3,366 ft (1,026 m)

Population (2020)
  - Total: 113
  - Density: 510/sq mi (200/km^{2})
- Time zone: UTC-6 (CST)
  - Summer (DST): UTC-5 (CDT)
- ZIP Code: 67745
- Area code: 785
- FIPS code: 20-43750
- GNIS ID: 2395064

McDonald is a city in Rawlins County, Kansas, United States. As of the 2020 census, the population of the city was 113.

== History ==
A post office was opened in Celia (an extinct town) in 1880, but it was moved to McDonald in 1888. McDonald was named for Rice McDonald, a landowner.

== Geography ==
According to the United States Census Bureau, the city has a total area of 0.22 square miles (0.57 km^{2}), all land.

=== Climate ===
According to the Köppen Climate Classification system, McDonald has a semi-arid climate, abbreviated "BSk" on climate maps.

According to weather data tallied between July 1, 1985 and June 30, 2015 for every location in the National Oceanic and Atmospheric Administration's official climate database, McDonald, Kansas, is the snowiest place in the state of Kansas with an average of 37.6 inches of snow per year.

Climate data for McDonald, Kansas (1991–2020)
Month	Jan	Feb	Mar	Apr	May	Jun	Jul	Aug	Sep	Oct	Nov	Dec	Year
Mean daily maximum °F (°C)	42.2 (5.7)	45.0 (7.2)	55.8 (13.2)	64.0 (17.8)	73.8 (23.2)	85.6 (29.8)	90.9 (32.7)	88.8 (31.6)	81.5 (27.5)	67.8 (19.9)	53.7 (12.1)	43.4 (6.3)	66.0 (18.9)
Daily mean °F (°C)	29.5 (−1.4)	31.9 (−0.1)	41.1 (5.1)	49.2 (9.6)	59.6 (15.3)	71.0 (21.7)	76.4 (24.7)	74.4 (23.6)	66.3 (19.1)	52.9 (11.6)	40.0 (4.4)	30.8 (−0.7)	51.9 (11.1)
Mean daily minimum °F (°C)	16.8 (−8.4)	18.9 (−7.3)	26.4 (−3.1)	34.4 (1.3)	45.3 (7.4)	56.4 (13.6)	61.9 (16.6)	60.0 (15.6)	51.1 (10.6)	38.0 (3.3)	26.4 (−3.1)	18.3 (−7.6)	37.8 (3.2)
Average precipitation inches (mm)	0.46 (12)	0.56 (14)	1.08 (27)	2.22 (56)	3.02 (77)	2.95 (75)	3.29 (84)	3.03 (77)	1.31 (33)	1.59 (40)	0.74 (19)	0.55 (14)	20.8 (528)
Average snowfall inches (cm)	5.8 (15)	5.6 (14)	5.4 (14)	4.1 (10)	0.0 (0.0)	0.0 (0.0)	0.0 (0.0)	0.0 (0.0)	0.7 (1.8)	2.1 (5.3)	4.7 (12)	5.2 (13)	33.6 (85.1)
Source: NOAA

== Demographics ==
Historical population
Census	Pop.	Note	%±
1920	341		—
1930	442		29.6%
1940	425		−3.8%
1950	426		0.2%
1960	225		−47.2%
1970	269		19.6%
1980	239		−11.2%
1990	184		−23.0%
2000	159		−13.6%
2010	160		0.6%
2020	113		−29.4%
U.S. Decennial Census

=== 2020 census ===
The 2020 United States census counted 113 people, 63 households, and 40 families in McDonald. The population density was 516.0 per square mile (199.2/km^{2}). There were 91 housing units at an average density of 415.5 per square mile (160.4/km^{2}). The racial makeup was 88.5% (100) white or European American (88.5% non-Hispanic white), 1.77% (2) black or African-American, 0.0% (0) Native American or Alaska Native, 0.0% (0) Asian, 0.0% (0) Pacific Islander or Native Hawaiian, 0.0% (0) from other races, and 9.73% (11) from two or more races. Hispanic or Latino of any race was 2.65% (3) of the population.

Of the 63 households, 15.9% had children under the age of 18; 47.6% were married couples living together; 30.2% had a female householder with no spouse or partner present. 31.7% of households consisted of individuals and 22.2% had someone living alone who was 65 years of age or older. The average household size was 2.1 and the average family size was 2.1. The percent of those with a bachelor's degree or higher was estimated to be 6.2% of the population.

18.6% of the population was under the age of 18, 1.8% from 18 to 24, 17.7% from 25 to 44, 28.3% from 45 to 64, and 33.6% who were 65 years of age or older. The median age was 59.8 years. For every 100 females, there were 98.2 males. For every 100 females ages 18 and older, there were 109.1 males.

The 2016–2020 5-year American Community Survey estimates show that the median household income was $40,417 (with a margin of error of +/- $16,401) and the median family income was $43,281 (+/- $15,330). Males had a median income of $31,250 (+/- $8,281) versus $9,688 (+/- $3,095) for females. The median income for those above 16 years old was $19,375 (+/- $10,149). Approximately, 14.9% of families and 33.3% of the population were below the poverty line, including 80.0% of those under the age of 18 and 17.9% of those ages 65 or over.

=== 2010 census ===
As of the census of 2010, there were 160 people, 77 households, and 48 families residing in the city. The population density was 727.3 inhabitants per square mile (280.8/km^{2}). There were 98 housing units at an average density of 445.5 per square mile (172.0/km^{2}). The racial makeup of the city was 97.5% White, 0.6% Native American, 0.6% from other races, and 1.3% from two or more races. Hispanic or Latino of any race were 11.3% of the population.

There were 77 households, of which 16.9% had children under the age of 18 living with them, 50.6% were married couples living together, 7.8% had a female householder with no husband present, 3.9% had a male householder with no wife present, and 37.7% were non-families. 32.5% of all households were made up of individuals, and 16.9% had someone living alone who was 65 years of age or older. The average household size was 2.08 and the average family size was 2.63.

The median age in the city was 53.5 years. 18.1% of residents were under the age of 18; 6.3% were between the ages of 18 and 24; 14.5% were from 25 to 44; 35.7% were from 45 to 64; and 25.6% were 65 years of age or older. The gender makeup of the city was 50.0% male and 50.0% female.

== Education ==
McDonald is served by Cheylin USD 103. School unification consolidated Bird City and McDonald schools in 1975 creating USD 103. The Cheylin High School mascot is Cheylin Cougars.

McDonald High School was closed through school unification. The McDonald High School mascot was the Tigers.

== Notable people ==
- Link Lyman (1898–1972) - football player and coach.
