= Ted Uhlaender =

American baseball player (1939–2009)

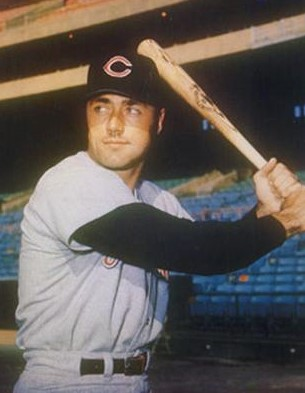
- Outfielder
- Born: October 21, 1939; Chicago Heights, Illinois, U.S.
- Died: February 12, 2009 (aged 69); Atwood, Kansas, U.S.
- Batted: Left Threw: Right

MLB debut
- September 4, 1965, for the Minnesota Twins

Last MLB appearance
- September 30, 1972, for the Cincinnati Reds

MLB statistics
- Batting average: .263
- Home runs: 36
- Runs batted in: 285
- Stats at Baseball Reference

Teams
- As player: Minnesota Twins (1965–1969); Cleveland Indians (1970–1971); Cincinnati Reds (1972); As coach: Cleveland Indians (2000–2001)

Theodore Otto Uhlaender (/ˈjuːlændər/ YOO-lan-dər; October 21, 1939 – February 12, 2009) was an American Major League Baseball outfielder for the Minnesota Twins, Cleveland Indians and Cincinnati Reds from 1965–1972. He is also the father of Olympic women's skeleton competitor Katie Uhlaender.

Signed by the Twins out of Baylor University in 1961, he made his major league debut four years later. He was ineligible for the 1965 World Series because his promotion occurred after the August 31 deadline. He became the team's starting center fielder for the next four seasons. Despite the 1968 campaign being totally dominated by pitchers, he managed to finish with a .283 batting average, fifth in the American League . He followed that up with his most productive season, establishing career highs with 152 games played, 93 runs scored, 151 hits and 62 runs batted in (RBI). His first playoff experience was in the 1969 American League Championship Series, with one hit in six at-bats.

He was traded along with Graig Nettles, Dean Chance and Bob Miller to the Indians for Luis Tiant and Stan Williams on December 10, 1969. He started in center in 1970, before being shifted to left field the next season.

After he was acquired by the Reds for Milt Wilcox on December 6, 1971, Uhlaender spent his last year as a player in the majors strictly as a reserve outfielder. He served as a pinch hitter during the postseason, going 1-for-2 in the National League Championship Series and getting a double out of four at-bats in the 1972 World Series.

Years after his playing career ended, Uhlaender returned to the Indians in 2000, spending two seasons as the first-base coach under manager Charlie Manuel. He was a scout for the San Francisco Giants from 2002 until learning he had multiple myeloma in 2008.

Uhlaender died of a heart attack at his ranch in Atwood, Kansas on February 12, 2009, just before his daughter Katie finished second in the women's skeleton World Cup season finale at Utah Olympic Park. Uhlaender's wife, Karen, stated that Katie did not know he had died until after the competition was finished. In memory of her father, she wears around her neck his ring from the 1972 season in which the Reds won the National League pennant.
