= Bassettville Township, Kansas =

Bassettville Township
- Township
- Location in Decatur County
- Coordinates: 39°41′55″N 100°41′07″W
- Country: United States
- State: Kansas
- County: Decatur

Area
  - Total: 35.82 sq mi (92.77 km^{2})
  - Land: 35.82 sq mi (92.77 km^{2})
  - Water: 0 sq mi (0 km^{2}) 0%
- Elevation: 2,790 ft (850 m)

Population (2020)
  - Total: 18
  - Density: 0.50/sq mi (0.19/km^{2})
- GNIS feature ID: 0471061

Bassettville Township is a township in Decatur County, Kansas, United States. As of the 2020 census, its population was 18.

== Geography ==
Bassettville Township covers an area of 35.82 square miles (92.8 km^{2}) and contains no incorporated settlements. According to the USGS, it contains one cemetery, Bassettville.

== History ==
Bassettville was issued a post office in 1879. The post office was discontinued in 1908.
