= Herndon, Kansas =

City in Rawlins County, Kansas

- City
- Location within Rawlins County and Kansas

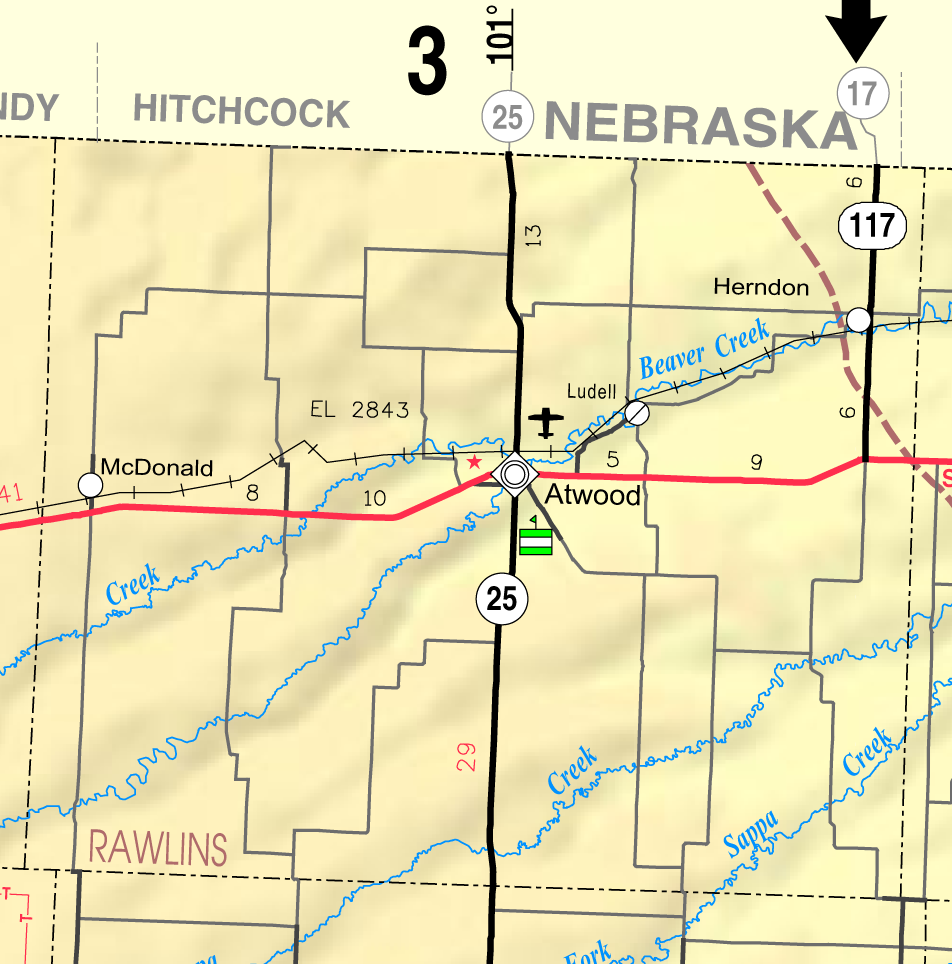
- KDOT map of Rawlins County (legend)
- Coordinates: 39°54′33″N 100°47′11″W
- Country: United States
- State: Kansas
- County: Rawlins
- Founded: 1878
- Incorporated: 1906
- Named for: William Herndon

Area
  - Total: 0.32 sq mi (0.82 km^{2})
  - Land: 0.32 sq mi (0.82 km^{2})
  - Water: 0 sq mi (0.00 km^{2})
- Elevation: 2,671 ft (814 m)

Population (2020)
  - Total: 119
  - Density: 380/sq mi (150/km^{2})
- Time zone: UTC-6 (CST)
  - Summer (DST): UTC-5 (CDT)
- ZIP Code: 67739
- Area code: 785
- FIPS code: 20-31475
- GNIS ID: 2394363
- Website: City website

Herndon is a city in Rawlins County, Kansas, United States. As of the 2020 census, the population of the city was 119. It is located approximately 12.5 miles (20.1 km) south of the Kansas-Nebraska state border.

== History ==
Herndon was originally called Pesth (named after Pest, Hungary, which later merged to become Budapest) and under the latter name was laid out in 1878. It was renamed Herndon in 1879, in honor of William H. Herndon, law partner of Abraham Lincoln. Herndon was incorporated as a city in 1906.

== Geography ==
According to the United States Census Bureau, the city has a total area of 0.26 square miles (0.67 km^{2}), all land.

== Demographics ==
Historical population
Census	Pop.	Note	%±
1910	273		—
1920	411		50.5%
1930	430		4.6%
1940	443		3.0%
1950	321		−27.5%
1960	339		5.6%
1970	268		−20.9%
1980	220		−17.9%
1990	170		−22.7%
2000	149		−12.4%
2010	129		−13.4%
2020	119		−7.8%
U.S. Decennial Census

=== 2020 census ===
The 2020 United States census counted 119 people, 55 households, and 30 families in Herndon. The population density was 377.8 per square mile (145.9/km^{2}). There were 93 housing units at an average density of 295.2 per square mile (114.0/km^{2}). The racial makeup was 94.96% (113) white or European American (94.96% non-Hispanic white), 0.0% (0) black or African-American, 0.0% (0) Native American or Alaska Native, 0.0% (0) Asian, 0.0% (0) Pacific Islander or Native Hawaiian, 0.0% (0) from other races, and 5.04% (6) from two or more races. Hispanic or Latino of any race was 0.84% (1) of the population.

Of the 55 households, 21.8% had children under the age of 18; 41.8% were married couples living together; 32.7% had a female householder with no spouse or partner present. 45.5% of households consisted of individuals and 25.5% had someone living alone who was 65 years of age or older. The average household size was 1.6 and the average family size was 2.3. The percent of those with a bachelor's degree or higher was estimated to be 7.6% of the population.

15.1% of the population was under the age of 18, 9.2% from 18 to 24, 26.1% from 25 to 44, 19.3% from 45 to 64, and 30.3% who were 65 years of age or older. The median age was 44.5 years. For every 100 females, there were 120.4 males. For every 100 females ages 18 and older, there were 119.6 males.

The 2016–2020 5-year American Community Survey estimates show that the median household income was $33,125 (with a margin of error of +/- $13,223) and the median family income was $48,333 (+/- $24,603). Males had a median income of $50,000 (+/- $24,508). Approximately, 2.6% of families and 14.0% of the population were below the poverty line, including 20.0% of those under the age of 18 and 17.5% of those ages 65 or over.

=== 2010 census ===
As of the census of 2010, there were 129 people, 66 households, and 33 families residing in the city. The population density was 496.2 inhabitants per square mile (191.6/km^{2}). There were 103 housing units at an average density of 396.2 per square mile (153.0/km^{2}). The racial makeup of the city was 94.6% White, 2.3% African American, and 3.1% from two or more races. Hispanic or Latino of any race were 1.6% of the population.

There were 66 households, of which 18.2% had children under the age of 18 living with them, 40.9% were married couples living together, 1.5% had a female householder with no husband present, 7.6% had a male householder with no wife present, and 50.0% were non-families. 42.4% of all households were made up of individuals, and 13.6% had someone living alone who was 65 years of age or older. The average household size was 1.95 and the average family size was 2.70.

The median age in the city was 51.1 years. 17.8% of residents were under the age of 18; 7% were between the ages of 18 and 24; 16.4% were from 25 to 44; 33.4% were from 45 to 64; and 25.6% were 65 years of age or older. The gender makeup of the city was 51.2% male and 48.8% female.

== Area events ==
- Herndon Ox Roast - is held every five years. Ox Roast kicks off the day with a parade followed by a lunch of pit smoked beef, live music, cow patty bingo, and an outhouse race in the afternoon. To end the day of events, a street dance is held on the Main Street of Herndon. Thousands attend this day long event.

== Education ==
The community is served by Rawlins County USD 105 public school district, formed in 2003 by the consolidation of Herndon USD 317 and Atwood USD 318. Residents attend school in Atwood: Rawlins County Elementary School and Rawlins County Junior-Senior High School.

Herndon schools were closed in 2004 through school unification. The Herndon High School mascot was Herndon Beavers.

== Notable people ==
- Rudolph Wendelin, Forest Service artist behind Smokey Bear.
