= Atwood, Kansas =

City in Rawlins County, Kansas

- City and County seat
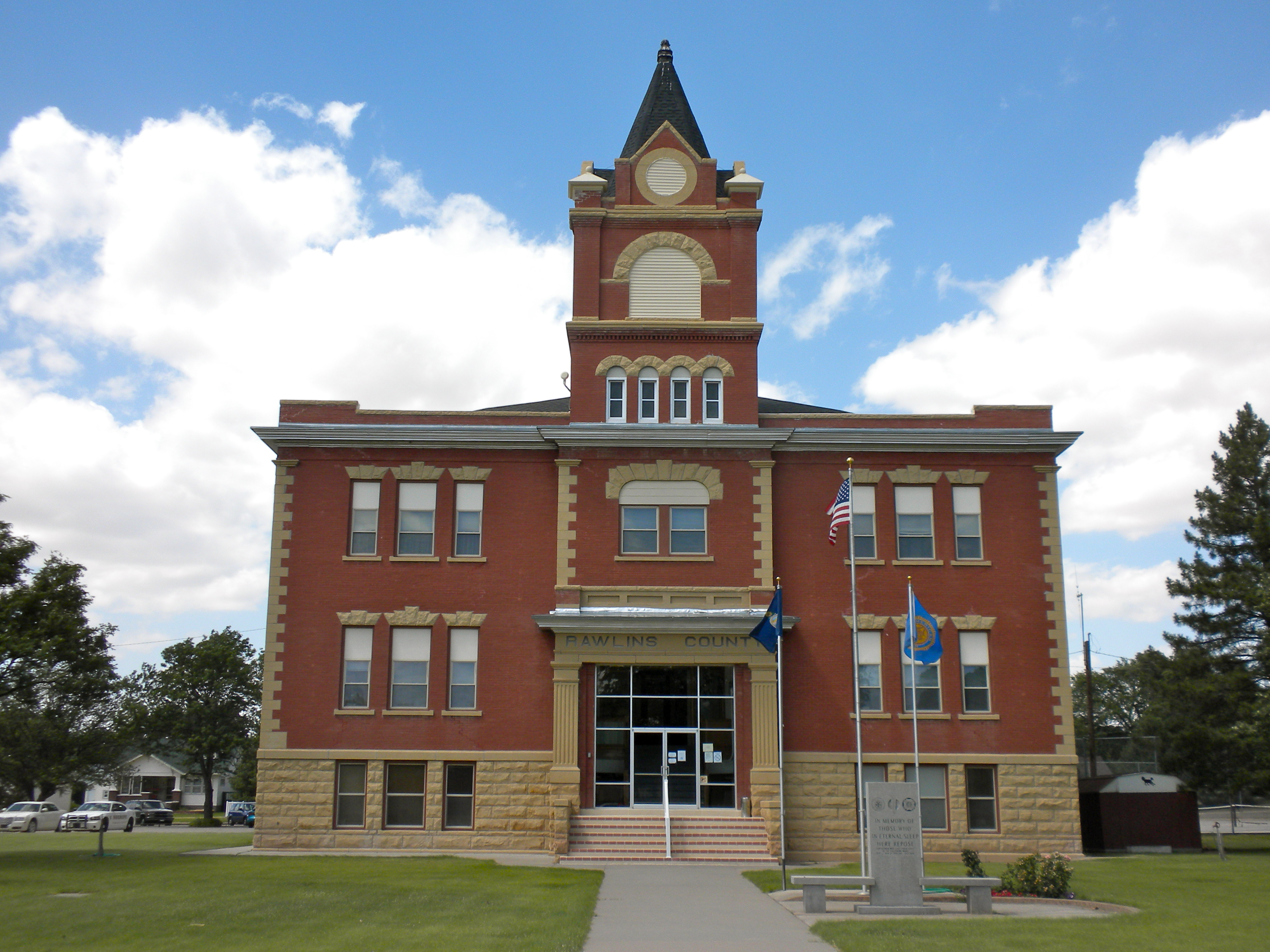
- Rawlins County Courthouse (2010)

- Location within Rawlins County and Kansas

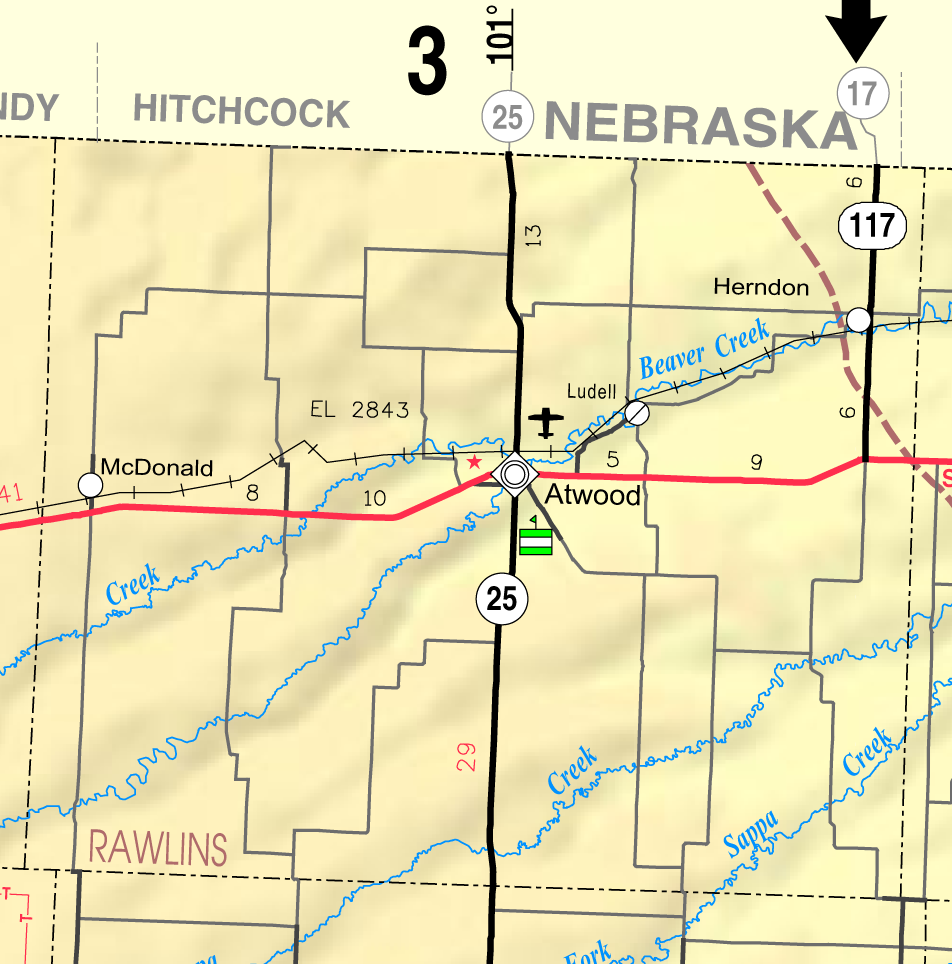
- KDOT map of Rawlins County (legend)
- Coordinates: 39°48′36″N 101°02′31″W
- Country: United States
- State: Kansas
- County: Rawlins
- Founded: 1875
- Incorporated: 1885
- Named for: Attwood Matheny

Area
  - Total: 1.12 sq mi (2.91 km^{2})
  - Land: 1.06 sq mi (2.75 km^{2})
  - Water: 0.062 sq mi (0.16 km^{2})
- Elevation: 2,854 ft (870 m)

Population (2020)
  - Total: 1,290
  - Density: 1,210/sq mi (469/km^{2})
- Time zone: UTC-6 (CST)
  - Summer (DST): UTC-5 (CDT)
- ZIP Code: 67730
- Area code: 785
- FIPS code: 20-03150
- GNIS ID: 2394021
- Website: cityofatwoodks.com

Atwood is a city in and the county seat of Rawlins County, Kansas, United States. As of the 2020 census, the population of the city was 1,290.

== History ==
In 1875, T.A. Andrews and J.M. Matheny traveled to Rawlins County and started a town site about two miles east of the current city. The city of Attwood (with two t's) was named after Attwood Matheny, the 14-year-old son who accompanied his father on the journey. In 1882, the U.S. Post Office requested permission to drop one "t" thus becoming Atwood. In 1881, Atwood became the county seat of Rawlins County.

== Geography ==
According to the United States Census Bureau, the city has a total area of 1.10 square miles (2.85 km^{2}), of which 1.04 square miles (2.69 km^{2}) is land and 0.06 square miles (0.16 km^{2}) is water.

=== Climate ===
According to the Köppen Climate Classification system, Atwood has a semi-arid climate, abbreviated "BSk" on climate maps.

Climate data for Atwood, Kansas, 1991–2020 normals, extremes 1908–present
Month	Jan	Feb	Mar	Apr	May	Jun	Jul	Aug	Sep	Oct	Nov	Dec	Year
Record high °F (°C)	82 (28)	84 (29)	92 (33)	98 (37)	104 (40)	113 (45)	118 (48)	110 (43)	107 (42)	101 (38)	87 (31)	82 (28)	118 (48)
Mean maximum °F (°C)	65.8 (18.8)	71.0 (21.7)	82.1 (27.8)	88.8 (31.6)	95.3 (35.2)	101.8 (38.8)	104.3 (40.2)	102.5 (39.2)	98.1 (36.7)	89.7 (32.1)	77.8 (25.4)	67.6 (19.8)	106.0 (41.1)
Mean daily maximum °F (°C)	42.6 (5.9)	45.5 (7.5)	56.8 (13.8)	65.5 (18.6)	75.1 (23.9)	87.1 (30.6)	92.4 (33.6)	89.7 (32.1)	81.8 (27.7)	67.6 (19.8)	54.2 (12.3)	43.6 (6.4)	66.8 (19.4)
Daily mean °F (°C)	28.9 (−1.7)	31.4 (−0.3)	41.1 (5.1)	49.9 (9.9)	60.4 (15.8)	71.8 (22.1)	77.3 (25.2)	75.0 (23.9)	66.1 (18.9)	51.8 (11.0)	39.3 (4.1)	30.0 (−1.1)	51.9 (11.1)
Mean daily minimum °F (°C)	15.1 (−9.4)	17.2 (−8.2)	25.4 (−3.7)	34.4 (1.3)	45.6 (7.6)	56.6 (13.7)	62.2 (16.8)	60.3 (15.7)	50.3 (10.2)	36.1 (2.3)	24.3 (−4.3)	16.4 (−8.7)	37.0 (2.8)
Mean minimum °F (°C)	−3.9 (−19.9)	−1.0 (−18.3)	8.4 (−13.1)	19.5 (−6.9)	30.7 (−0.7)	43.0 (6.1)	51.3 (10.7)	49.6 (9.8)	34.8 (1.6)	19.1 (−7.2)	7.6 (−13.6)	−2.1 (−18.9)	−10.0 (−23.3)
Record low °F (°C)	−33 (−36)	−27 (−33)	−22 (−30)	1 (−17)	15 (−9)	31 (−1)	39 (4)	35 (2)	18 (−8)	1 (−17)	−17 (−27)	−34 (−37)	−34 (−37)
Average precipitation inches (mm)	0.44 (11)	0.60 (15)	1.05 (27)	2.30 (58)	3.23 (82)	3.21 (82)	3.40 (86)	3.20 (81)	1.69 (43)	1.57 (40)	0.81 (21)	0.58 (15)	22.08 (561)
Average snowfall inches (cm)	5.0 (13)	6.1 (15)	4.5 (11)	3.1 (7.9)	0.6 (1.5)	0.0 (0.0)	0.0 (0.0)	0.0 (0.0)	0.0 (0.0)	1.6 (4.1)	3.8 (9.7)	4.0 (10)	28.7 (72.2)
Average precipitation days (≥ 0.01 in)	2.5	3.6	4.7	6.9	9.5	8.6	8.4	7.7	5.1	5.6	3.6	2.8	69.0
Average snowy days (≥ 0.1 in)	1.9	2.3	1.8	0.3	0.1	0.0	0.0	0.0	0.0	0.6	1.6	1.9	10.5
Source: NOAA

== Demographics ==
Historical population
Census	Pop.	Note	%±
1890	450		—
1900	486		8.0%
1910	680		39.9%
1920	919		35.1%
1930	1,106		20.3%
1940	1,408		27.3%
1950	1,613		14.6%
1960	1,906		18.2%
1970	1,658		−13.0%
1980	1,665		0.4%
1990	1,388		−16.6%
2000	1,279		−7.9%
2010	1,194		−6.6%
2020	1,290		8.0%
U.S. Decennial Census

=== 2020 census ===
The 2020 United States census counted 1,290 people, 557 households, and 324 families in Atwood. The population density was 1,213.5 per square mile (468.6/km^{2}). There were 648 housing units at an average density of 609.6 per square mile (235.4/km^{2}). The racial makeup was 87.21% (1,125) white or European American (84.11% non-Hispanic white), 1.01% (13) black or African-American, 0.16% (2) Native American or Alaska Native, 0.31% (4) Asian, 0.0% (0) Pacific Islander or Native Hawaiian, 3.64% (47) from other races, and 7.67% (99) from two or more races. Hispanic or Latino of any race was 9.46% (122) of the population.

Of the 557 households, 28.0% had children under the age of 18; 43.4% were married couples living together; 27.5% had a female householder with no spouse or partner present. 37.5% of households consisted of individuals and 18.5% had someone living alone who was 65 years of age or older. The average household size was 2.1 and the average family size was 2.5. The percent of those with a bachelor's degree or higher was estimated to be 12.9% of the population.

23.3% of the population was under the age of 18, 5.9% from 18 to 24, 22.7% from 25 to 44, 21.6% from 45 to 64, and 26.4% who were 65 years of age or older. The median age was 42.4 years. For every 100 females, there were 106.7 males. For every 100 females ages 18 and older, there were 108.2 males.

The 2016–2020 5-year American Community Survey estimates show that the median household income was $65,063 (with a margin of error of +/- $12,385) and the median family income was $75,987 (+/- $3,553). Males had a median income of $37,381 (+/- $8,708) versus $31,181 (+/- $5,889) for females. The median income for those above 16 years old was $35,152 (+/- $3,951). Approximately, 3.0% of families and 5.8% of the population were below the poverty line, including 7.8% of those under the age of 18 and 6.5% of those ages 65 or over.

=== 2010 census ===
As of the census of 2010, there were 1,194 people, 568 households, and 299 families residing in the city. The population density was 1,148.1 inhabitants per square mile (443.3/km^{2}). There were 666 housing units at an average density of 640.4 per square mile (247.3/km^{2}). The racial makeup of the city was 97.2% White, 0.2% African American, 0.3% Native American, 0.1% Asian, 1.0% from other races, and 1.3% from two or more races. Hispanic or Latino of any race were 2.9% of the population.

There were 568 households, of which 20.2% had children under the age of 18 living with them, 43.0% were married couples living together, 6.2% had a female householder with no husband present, 3.5% had a male householder with no wife present, and 47.4% were non-families. 44.7% of all households were made up of individuals, and 23.2% had someone living alone who was 65 years of age or older. The average household size was 2.03 and the average family size was 2.84.

The median age in the city was 50.9 years. 20.3% of residents were under the age of 18; 4.7% were between the ages of 18 and 24; 17% were from 25 to 44; 29.5% were from 45 to 64; and 28.6% were 65 years of age or older. The gender makeup of the city was 47.4% male and 52.6% female.

== Area attractions ==
- Rawlins County Historical Museum, 308 State Street.
- Shirley Opera House (NRHP), 503 Main Street.

== Area events ==
- Rawlins County Fair, held in July.

== Education ==
The community is served by Rawlins County USD 105 public school district, formed in 2003 by the consolidation of Herndon USD 317 and Atwood USD 318. The district has two schools in Atwood:

- Rawlins County Junior/Senior High School
- Rawlins County Elementary School

== Infrastructure ==
=== Transportation ===
==== Highway ====
US-36 and K-25 highways intersect in Atwood.

==== Rail ====
Nebraska Kansas Colorado Railway passes through Atwood.

==== Airport ====
- Atwood-Rawlins County City-County Airport (ICAO: KADT)

== Notable people ==
- Mike Argabright - Kansas State Senator
- Mike Hayden - 41st governor of Kansas 1987–1990.
- Ted Uhlaender - Major League Baseball outfielder for the Minnesota Twins, Cleveland Indians and Cincinnati Reds from 1965–1972.

== See also ==
- National Register of Historic Places listings in Kansas
