= Rawlins County, Kansas =

County in Kansas, United States

- County
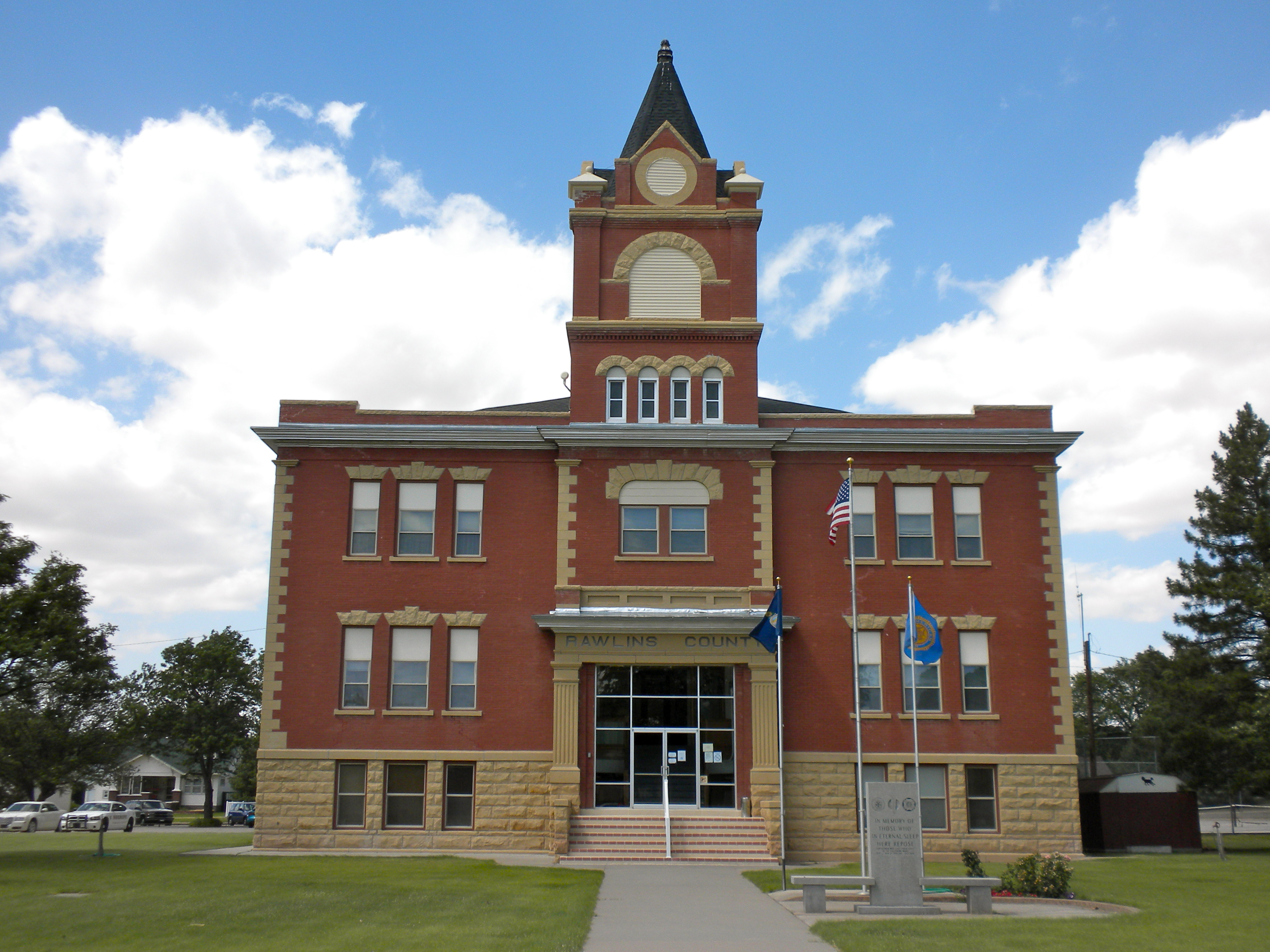
- Rawlins County Courthouse in Atwood (2010)

- Location within the U.S. state of Kansas
- Coordinates: 39°48′N 101°06′W
- Country: United States
- State: Kansas
- Founded: March 20, 1873
- Named for: John Aaron Rawlins
- Seat: Atwood
- Largest city: Atwood

Area
  - Total: 1,070 sq mi (2,800 km^{2})
  - Land: 1,069 sq mi (2,770 km^{2})
  - Water: 0.2 sq mi (0.52 km^{2}) 0.01%

Population (2020)
  - Total: 2,561
  - Estimate (2025): 2,431 ▼
  - Density: 2.4/sq mi (0.93/km^{2})
- Time zone: UTC−6 (Central)
  - Summer (DST): UTC−5 (CDT)
- Area code: 785
- Congressional district: 1st
- Website: rawlinscounty.org

Rawlins County is a county located in the U.S. state of Kansas. Its county seat and largest city is Atwood. As of the 2020 census, the county population was 2,561. It was named after John Rawlins, a general in the American Civil War.

== History ==
=== Early history ===
For many millennia, the Great Plains of North America were inhabited by nomadic Native Americans. From the 16th century to 18th century, the Kingdom of France claimed ownership of large parts of North America. In 1762, after the French and Indian War, France secretly ceded New France to Spain, per the Treaty of Fontainebleau.

=== 19th century ===
In 1802, Spain returned most of the land to France, but keeping title to about 7,500 square miles. In 1803, most of the land for modern day Kansas was acquired by the United States from France as part of the 828,000 square mile Louisiana Purchase for 2.83 cents per acre.

In 1854, the Kansas Territory was organized, then in 1861 Kansas became the 34th U.S. state. In 1873, Rawlins County was established.

=== The Battle of Sappa Creek ===
The Battle of Sappa Creek, Battle at Sappa Creek also known as the Massacre at Cheyenne Hole, was fought on April 23, 1875, between Company H of the Sixth United States Cavalry under the command of Second lieutenant Austin Henley and a group of Cheyenne Indians led by Little Bull. The conflict took place in modern-day Rawlins County, Kansas, and was both the final and the deadliest battle in the Red River War.

While camped on the banks of the Sappa Creek, 40 men of the Sixth U.S. Cavalry from Fort Wallace, accompanied by several buffalo hunters, attacked a group of Cheyenne Indians. The battle turned into a massacre. Henley reported two soldiers were killed, along with Indian casualties of 19 warriors, eight women, and eight children. However, hunters who visited the site days later said they found approximately 70 dead Indians with at least 27 being partially buried, as if to hide the bodies.

After the battle, the soldiers burned the camp and captured 134 horses. Only two Cheyenne reportedly survived. One had no family in the camp, but the other did. When safely out of rifle range, the one with the family told the other to go on while he went back to die with his family.

Other accounts shed more doubt on Henley's report. Henley said only three buffalo hunters were at the battle. However, other accounts suggest three groups of between 20 and 30 hunters per group were there. Historian E.S. Sutton suggested the buffalo hunters started the battle, shooting down several Indians under a flag of truce. Sutton said 30 to 40 Indians escaped, and Henley was demoted for his handling.

=== The Last Indian Raid in Kansas ===
The Last Indian Raid in Kansas, a part of the Northern Cheyenne Exodus, also called Dull Knife's Raid, the Cheyenne War, or the Cheyenne Campaign, occurred on September 30 through October 1, 1878, when Northern Cheyenne warriors, led by Little Wolf and Dull Knife, killed around 30 settlers along the Beaver Creek in Rawlins County and the Sappa Creek in Decatur County over a two‑day period.

==== Confinement in Oklahoma ====
Following confirmation from Washington D.C., the Cheyenne started their move with 972 people; upon reaching the Cheyenne Arapaho reservation on August 5, 1877, there were only 937 people. Some elderly had perished along the way and some young men crept away and headed back north. After reaching the reservation, the Northern Cheyenne noticed how poverty-stricken it was, and began to fall sick in the late summer of 1877. When conditions did not improve after a federal investigation into reservation conditions, the Cheyenne were given authorization to hunt.

When the Cheyenne attempted to hunt game, they found none and by the winter of 1877–78 the territory was just a wasteland of dead buffalo remains, as the U.S. Army had sanctioned and actively endorsed the wholesale slaughter of bison herds. Through the past decade the federal government had promoted bison hunting for various reasons, to allow ranchers to range their cattle without competition from other bovines, but primarily to weaken the North American Indian population by removing their main food source and to pressure them onto the Indian reservations during times of conflict. Unfortunately, in 1878 there was also a measles outbreak that struck the Northern Cheyenne, and in August 1878 the Cheyenne chiefs began preparations to move back north. On September 9, 1878, Little Wolf, Dull Knife, Wild Hog, and Left Hand told their people to organize to leave. The runaways totaled 353 in all: 92 were men of fighting age, while the remaining 261 were women, children and elderly. During their journey they were able to elude military pursuers, largely by traveling at night and hiding during the day. Their journey was slowed because of frequent encounters with the U.S. Cavalry and raids on fresh meat and horses.

===== Last Indian Raid =====
In their trek towards their home, the Northern Cheyenne moved through Kansas, raided cattle camps south of Dodge City and encountered Army troops near Scott City, but managed to escape capture. On Sept. 30, 1878, the Northern Cheyenne arrived in Decatur County, plundering the countryside and killing some 18 settlers. The next day, they killed about a dozen settlers in Rawlins County and headed over to Nebraska where they eventually surrendered.

A group of people encountered Cheyenne camped on Prairie Dog Creek in northwestern Kansas on September 29 and lost 80 cattle. Between September 30 and October 1, in present-day Decatur County and Rawlins County near Oberlin, Kansas small parties of Cheyenne foraging for horses, cattle and supplies fell on isolated settlers who had recently homesteaded along Sappa and Beaver Creeks. Some of the settlers, recent immigrants from eastern Europe, had never seen an Indian before.

==== Cheyenne Aftermath ====
The Northern Cheyenne split into two groups. Little Wolf's band eventually reached Montana and was allowed to stay. Dull Knife's band was captured in Nebraska; many were killed during the tragic Fort Robinson breakout in January 1879. Ultimately, the U.S. government allowed surviving Northern Cheyenne to establish a reservation in Montana which was their homeland.

===== The Indian Boy =====
For six weeks, a young Cheyenne Indian boy, around nineteen years of age, lived among rocks now known as "Hundred Head Draw." Dragging a crushed leg behind him, he survived on the meat of slaughtered cattle. He had been left behind when his Northern Cheyenne tribe came through the area on its journey north, locally known as the Last Indian Raid in Kansas. His injured leg would have only slowed down the tribe that was already being closely perused by the U.S. Army. So, he stayed behind, living off the land for six weeks until he was discovered

He was discovered by Arthur Abbott, whose young cousin George Harrison Abbott had been killed during the raid, and a friend named Harney. They were herding cattle near the draw when they saw something move among the rocks. After shooting at it, they rode closer and discovered it was an Indian boy. The boy, they thought was pointing a gun at them. Riding to the rear, one man fired the shot that killed the young boy. The gun the Cheyenne teenager was pointing was actually just a stick. The men left the Cheyenne's body in the sandstone crevice where it fell. No body was found, and it is believed the boy was eaten by coyotes.

In 1903, C. E. Perkin, president of the Chicago, Burlington, and Quincy Railroad erected a monument near the site where the boy died. The worn inscription reads:

"A party of Cheyennes from the Indian Territory crossed the Beaver in their way north between what is now Atwood and Watts, now Herndon. They killed 12 whites on the Beaver, went north to the Union Pacific railroad where some of them were captured near Ogallala. An Indian boy about 19 years old was wounded and left behind in what has since been known as Hundred Head Draw, near where this stone stands. He was killed on this spot Nov. 16, 1878, by Abbott and Harney, who were herding cattle there. The body was never recovered except by the coyotes."

=== The Last Lynching in Kansas ===
The last lynching in Kansas took place on April 18, 1932, and was referred to by newspapers across the country as 'justice' for the brutal murder of a young girl. 53-year-old Richard Read from Thomas County was lynched on the Ed Lymann ranch in Rawlins County, by a mob of around 200 people, none of which have ever officially been identified.

On April 14, 1942, eight-year-old Dorothy Hunter of Selden, Kansas, was kidnapped by Richard Read while walking home from the rural school she attended. Read held Dorothy for 24 hours, during which he assaulted her, and then killed her using a subsoiler, stashing her in a haystack south of Herndon. Read then returned to Colby, Kansas, where he told Thomas County Sheriff Ed McGinley that he had been kidnapped by two armed men near Seldon, but had made an escape near Atwood. The officers, aware of the missing child in Selden, began questioning Read, who finally confesses to the kidnapping and murder of Dorothy. Read also confessed he was intoxicated at the time of the kidnapping.

Word of the arrest of Read reached Seldon, and 100 angry men went to Colby and surrounded the jail where Read was held. However, Read had not yet disclosed where the girl's body was, so the sheriff had to plead to the crowd that the body would never be found if Read was released to the crowd. After the crowd dispersed in early morning, Read confessed the body was located in a haystack south of Herndon.

Authorities feared Read would not be safe in the Thomas County jail since people knew of his location, so they transferred him to the Cheyenne County jail in St. Francis. On April 17, Dorothy was buried in Hoxie, after which vengeance flared up once again for Read.

On April 18, word of Read's location had spread, and a mob of about 200 people soon gathered. Around 40 men went to the Cheyenne County Courthouse where the jail was located, to grab Read. Outside of the courthouse was county sheriff A.A. Bacon, who was overpowered by the group, who then took his keys. The group then dragged a pleading Read from his cell into a car. Bacon was put into another car and then was released about four miles east of St. Francis.

The group found an isolated spot between McDonald and Atwood on the Ed Lymann ranch, where they then lynched Read. Meanwhile, Sheriff Bacon had returned to St. Francis where he called nearby county officers and told them the mob was en route back to Selden. Before the officers could organize, word had gotten to them that Read had been hanged. To this day, no members of the mob have ever been officially identified.

== Notable people ==
- Mike Argabright - Member of the Kansas Senate.
- Bill Bearley - Football, baseball, and tennis coach. Coached baseball at the University of Wyoming and coached football at Fort Hays State.
- Mike Hayden - 41st governor of Kansas 1987–1990.
- Dan Lankas - Hall of Fame football player for Kansas State University. NFL player for the St. Louis Cardinals.
- Link Lyman - NFL football player for the Canton/Cleveland Bulldogs, the Frankford Yellow Jackets, and the Chicago Bears. Four Time NFL Champion and five time first-team All-Pro player. College football player and coach for the Nebraska Cornhuskers and coach at Creighton University.
- Katie Uhlander - Six-time Olympic skeleton racer and six-time placer at IBSF World Championship.
- Ted Uhlander - Major League Baseball outfielder for the Minnesota Twins, Cleveland Indians and Cincinnati Reds from 1965 to 1972.
- Rudolph Wendelin - Forest Service artist behind Smokey Bear.

== Geography ==
According to the U.S. Census Bureau, the county has a total area of 1,070 square miles (2,800 km^{2}), of which 1,069 square miles (2,770 km^{2}) is land and 0.2 square miles (0.52 km^{2}) (0.1%) is water.

=== Major highways ===
- U.S. Highway 36
- Kansas Highway 25
- Kansas Highway 117

=== Adjacent counties ===
- Hitchcock County, Nebraska (north)
- Red Willow County, Nebraska (northeast)
- Decatur County (east)
- Thomas County (south)
- Sherman County (southwest/Mountain Time border)
- Cheyenne County (west)
- Dundy County, Nebraska (northwest/Mountain Time border)

== Demographics ==
Historical population
Census	Pop.	Note	%±
1880	1,623		—
1890	6,756		316.3%
1900	5,241		−22.4%
1910	6,380		21.7%
1920	6,799		6.6%
1930	7,362		8.3%
1940	6,618		−10.1%
1950	5,728		−13.4%
1960	5,279		−7.8%
1970	4,393		−16.8%
1980	4,105		−6.6%
1990	3,404		−17.1%
2000	2,966		−12.9%
2010	2,519		−15.1%
2020	2,561		1.7%
2025 (est.)	2,431	▼	−5.1%
U.S. Decennial Census; 1790-1960 1900-1990; 1990-2000 2010-2020

=== 2020 census ===
As of the 2020 census, the county had a population of 2,561. The median age was 46.3 years. 22.6% of residents were under the age of 18 and 27.5% of residents were 65 years of age or older. For every 100 females there were 102.6 males, and for every 100 females age 18 and over there were 99.5 males age 18 and over.

The racial makeup of the county was 89.1% White, 0.7% Black or African American, 0.1% American Indian and Alaska Native, 0.4% Asian, 0.0% Native Hawaiian and Pacific Islander, 2.9% from some other race, and 6.7% from two or more races. Hispanic or Latino residents of any race comprised 6.2% of the population.

0.0% of residents lived in urban areas, while 100.0% lived in rural areas.

There were 1,129 households in the county, of which 27.1% had children under the age of 18 living with them and 22.5% had a female householder with no spouse or partner present. About 32.4% of all households were made up of individuals and 16.8% had someone living alone who was 65 years of age or older.

There were 1,364 housing units, of which 17.2% were vacant. Among occupied housing units, 71.9% were owner-occupied and 28.1% were renter-occupied. The homeowner vacancy rate was 1.4% and the rental vacancy rate was 9.6%.

=== 2000 census ===
As of the census of 2000, there were 2,966 people, 1,269 households, and 846 families residing in the county. The population density was 3 people per square mile (1.2 people/km^{2}). There were 1,565 housing units at an average density of 2 per square mile (0.77/km^{2}). The racial makeup of the county was 98.52% White, 0.30% Black or African American, 0.30% Native American, 0.10% Asian, 0.07% from other races, and 0.71% from two or more races. 0.81% of the population were Hispanic or Latino of any race.

There were 1,269 households, out of which 27.50% had children under the age of 18 living with them, 59.50% were married couples living together, 4.90% had a female householder with no husband present, and 33.30% were non-families. 31.40% of all households were made up of individuals, and 17.60% had someone living alone who was 65 years of age or older. The average household size was 2.29 and the average family size was 2.88.

In the county, the population was spread out, with 24.00% under the age of 18, 3.80% from 18 to 24, 21.50% from 25 to 44, 25.10% from 45 to 64, and 25.60% who were 65 years of age or older. The median age was 45 years. For every 100 females there were 99.90 males. For every 100 females age 18 and over, there were 95.10 males.

The median income for a household in the county was $32,105, and the median income for a family was $40,074. Males had a median income of $26,719 versus $19,750 for females. The per capita income for the county was $17,161. About 7.90% of families and 12.50% of the population were below the poverty line, including 18.00% of those under age 18 and 8.90% of those age 65 or over.

== Government ==
=== Presidential elections ===
Presidential election results

United States presidential election results for Rawlins County, Kansas
Year	Republican		Democratic		Third party(ies)	
Year	No.	%	No.	%	No.	%
1888	1,023	57.31%	633	35.46%	129	7.23%
1892	592	43.79%	0	0.00%	760	56.21%
1896	439	41.77%	609	57.94%	3	0.29%
1900	577	45.90%	668	53.14%	12	0.95%
1904	749	61.14%	405	33.06%	71	5.80%
1908	719	47.36%	732	48.22%	67	4.41%
1912	220	16.63%	568	42.93%	535	40.44%
1916	803	35.05%	1,271	55.48%	217	9.47%
1920	1,236	64.81%	495	25.96%	176	9.23%
1924	1,213	45.79%	742	28.01%	694	26.20%
1928	1,668	57.78%	1,164	40.32%	55	1.91%
1932	1,064	31.08%	2,245	65.59%	114	3.33%
1936	1,364	40.07%	2,029	59.61%	11	0.32%
1940	1,758	58.02%	1,247	41.16%	25	0.83%
1944	1,569	61.72%	955	37.57%	18	0.71%
1948	1,389	55.08%	1,095	43.42%	38	1.51%
1952	2,120	75.82%	670	23.96%	6	0.21%
1956	1,668	69.88%	711	29.79%	8	0.34%
1960	1,560	61.73%	951	37.63%	16	0.63%
1964	1,292	57.14%	959	42.41%	10	0.44%
1968	1,438	65.90%	553	25.34%	191	8.75%
1972	1,553	70.46%	560	25.41%	91	4.13%
1976	1,148	53.87%	903	42.37%	80	3.75%
1980	1,524	73.41%	427	20.57%	125	6.02%
1984	1,625	78.05%	412	19.79%	45	2.16%
1988	1,318	66.46%	612	30.86%	53	2.67%
1992	1,023	52.87%	393	20.31%	519	26.82%
1996	1,393	73.78%	335	17.74%	160	8.47%
2000	1,349	77.53%	306	17.59%	85	4.89%
2004	1,414	82.21%	289	16.80%	17	0.99%
2008	1,247	80.50%	273	17.62%	29	1.87%
2012	1,223	84.70%	190	13.16%	31	2.15%
2016	1,220	82.88%	163	11.07%	89	6.05%
2020	1,261	83.84%	214	14.23%	29	1.93%
2024	1,194	85.10%	176	12.54%	33	2.35%

The county is part of the highly Republican Kansas's 1st congressional district. It has favored the Republican candidate for president in each of the last eighteen elections. The last Democrat to carry the county was Franklin D. Roosevelt in 1936, when the GOP standard bearer was Kansas Governor Alf Landon. As of 2024, Bill Clinton in 1992 remains the last Democratic nominee to exceed even 20% of the county's vote.

=== Law ===
Following amendment to the Kansas Constitution in 1986, the county remained a prohibition, or "dry", county until 2002, when voters approved the sale of alcoholic liquor by the individual drink with a 30% food sales requirement.

== Education ==
=== Unified school districts ===
- Rawlins County USD 105

== Communities ==
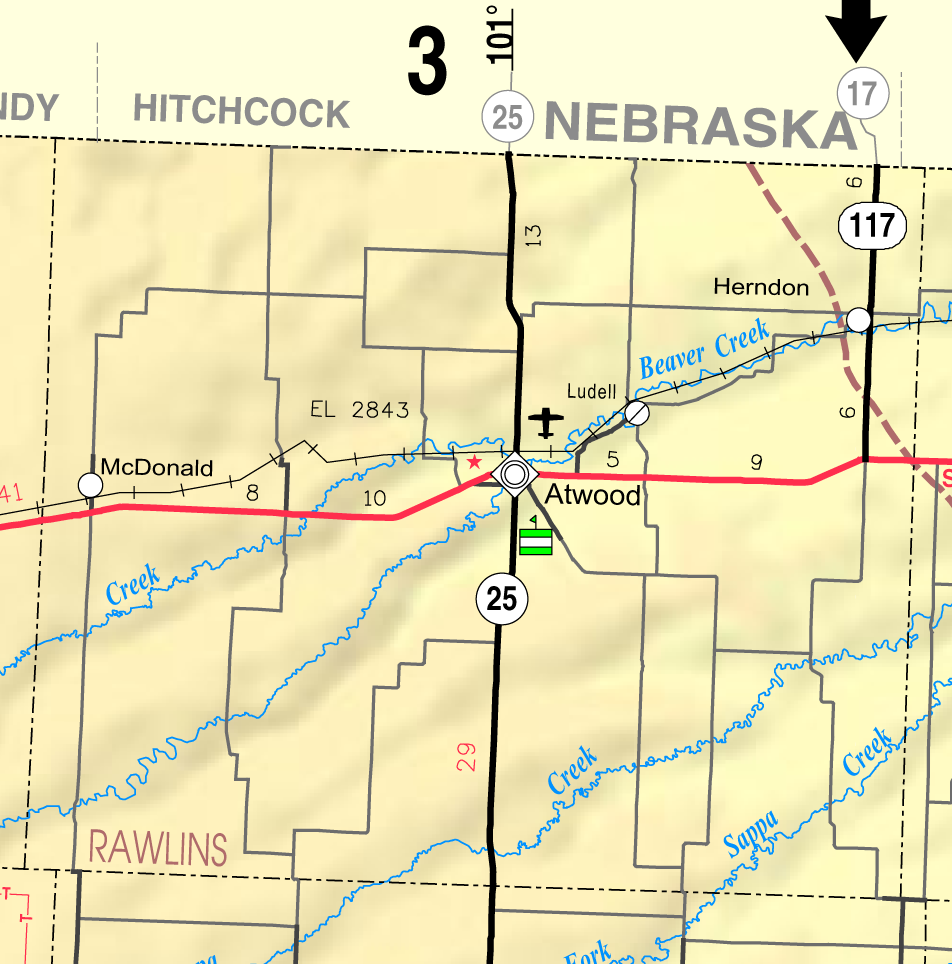
2005 map of Rawlins County (map legend)

List of townships / incorporated cities / unincorporated communities / extinct former communities within Rawlins County.
† means a community is designated a Census-Designated Place (CDP) by the United States Census Bureau.

=== Cities ===
- Atwood (county seat)
- Herndon
- McDonald

=== Unincorporated communities ===
- Blakeman
- Ludell†

=== Ghost towns ===
- Achilles
- Beardsley
- Beaverton
- Burntwood
- Celia
- Chardon
- Gladstone
- Greshamton
- Mirage
- Rawlins
- Rotate

=== Townships ===
Old maps show that Rawlins County had twenty townships in 1906, with no boundary changes as of 1928: Burntwood, Driftwood, Elk, Richland, Beaver, Ludell, Herndon, Celia, Logan, Atwood, Union, Laing, Rotate, Mirage, Mikesell, Arbor, Achilles, Grant, Clinton, Jefferson.

The county is currently divided into ten townships. None of the cities within the county are considered governmentally independent, and all figures for the townships include those of the cities. In the following table, the population center is the largest city (or cities) included in that township's population total, if it is of a significant size.

Sources: 2000 U.S. Gazetteer from the U.S. Census Bureau.
Township	FIPS	Population center	Population	Population density /km^{2} (/sq mi)	Land area km^{2} (sq mi)	Water area km^{2} (sq mi)	Water %	Geographic coordinates
Achilles	00175		83	1 (2)	132 (51)	0 (0)	0.02%	39°42′13″N 100°48′38″W
Atwood	03175		1,330	74 (192)	18 (7)	0 (0)	0.88%	39°48′38″N 101°2′34″W
Center	12037		363	1 (1)	690 (266)	0 (0)	0%	39°43′11″N 101°3′56″W
Driftwood	18675		84	0 (1)	185 (72)	0 (0)	0%	39°57′56″N 101°4′59″W
Herl	31462		386	1 (2)	491 (190)	0 (0)	0%	39°49′24″N 100°49′54″W
Jefferson	35300		34	0 (1)	124 (48)	0 (0)	0.04%	39°36′42″N 100°48′31″W
Ludell	43200		136	1 (4)	92 (35)	0 (0)	0.01%	39°51′30″N 100°57′1″W
Mirage	47175		43	0 (1)	185 (71)	0 (0)	0%	39°38′53″N 101°14′2″W
Rocewood	60362		448	1 (2)	742 (287)	0 (0)	0%	39°48′17″N 101°18′59″W
Union	72275		59	1 (1)	111 (43)	0 (0)	0%	39°46′51″N 100°53′55″W

== See also ==
Community information for Kansas

- Kansas locations by per capita income
- List of counties in Kansas
- List of townships in Kansas
- List of cities in Kansas
- List of unincorporated communities in Kansas
- List of ghost towns in Kansas
