= Kansas Turnpike Bridges =

- Coordinates: 38.9920°N 95.2393°W
- Carries: 6 lanes of I-70 / Kansas Turnpike
- Crosses: Kansas River
- Locale: Lawrence, Kansas
- Maintained by: KTA

Characteristics
- Design: 2 Deck Truss Bridges (original spans), 2 multi-beam girder bridges (current span)

History
- Opened: 1956 (original spans); 2009 (current westbound span); 2010 (current eastbound span)

Location
- Interactive map of Kansas Turnpike Bridges

The Kansas Turnpike Bridges are a pair of multi-beam girder bridge that carry the Kansas Turnpike and Interstate 70 over the Kansas River at Lawrence, Kansas.

The first bridges were a pair of deck trusses, each carrying two lanes of traffic. The bridges were the site of the groundbreaking of the Turnpike on December 31, 1954. The bridges, along with the rest of the Turnpike, was opened for a day of free travel on October 20, 1956, between 6 a.m. and 2pm., then opened for regular traffic on October 25 at 10 a.m.

The bridge was widened and rebuilt sometime after 1973.

By 2007, the bridges were considered to be at the end of their design life, and a project to replace the bridges was begun. The first of the two new bridge was opened to traffic in October 2009, carrying 2 lanes in each direction., with the demolition of the old bridge occurring with several blasts, the first of which occurred on November 15, 2009 and the last on January 13, 2010. The second bridge was completed in late 2010, with traffic moved onto the new bridge on November 29.
