= K-tag =

The term "K-tag" may refer to:

- K-TAG, a toll collection transponder for the Kansas Turnpike
- K-tag, a recognized colloquial term for a United States Forest Service Location Poster, a rural navigational aid

== See also ==
- Kansas Turnpike
- Electronic toll collection
- United States Forest Service
- Public Land Survey System
- Bearing Tree
