= Interstate 70 in Kansas =

Interstate highway located primarily in the state of Kansas

Interstate 70
- I-70 highlighted in red

Route information
- Maintained by KDOT and KTA
- Length: 424.15 mi (682.60 km)
- Existed: 1956–present
- NHS: Entire route

Major junctions
- West end: I-70 / US 24 at the Colorado state line in Kanorado
- I-135 / US-81 in Salina; I-470 / US-75 in Topeka; I-470 / Kansas Turnpike / US-40 / K-4 near Topeka; I-435 in Kansas City; I-635 in Kansas City; I-670 in Kansas City
- East end: I-70 / US 24 / US 40 / US 169 at the Missouri state line in Kansas City, MO

Location
- Country: United States
- State: Kansas
- Counties: Sherman, Thomas, Logan, Gove, Trego, Ellis, Russell, Ellsworth, Lincoln, Saline, Dickinson, Geary, Riley, Wabaunsee, Shawnee, Douglas, Leavenworth, Wyandotte

Highway system
- Interstate Highway System; Main; Auxiliary; Suffixed; Business; Future; Kansas State Highway System; Interstate; US; State; Spurs
← US-69	→ K-71

Interstate 70 (I-70) is a mainline route of the Interstate Highway System in the United States connecting Cove Fort, Utah, to Baltimore, Maryland. In the US state of Kansas, I-70 extends just over 424 miles (682 km) from the Colorado border near the town of Kanorado to the Missouri border in Kansas City. I-70 in Kansas contains the first segment in the country to start being paved and to be completed in the Interstate Highway System. The route passes through several of the state's principal cities in the process, including Kansas City, Topeka, and Salina. The route also passes through the cities of Lawrence, Junction City, and Abilene.

The section of I-70 from Topeka to the Missouri border is co-designated as the Kansas Turnpike; only the section between Topeka and just west of Kansas City is tolled.

== Route description ==
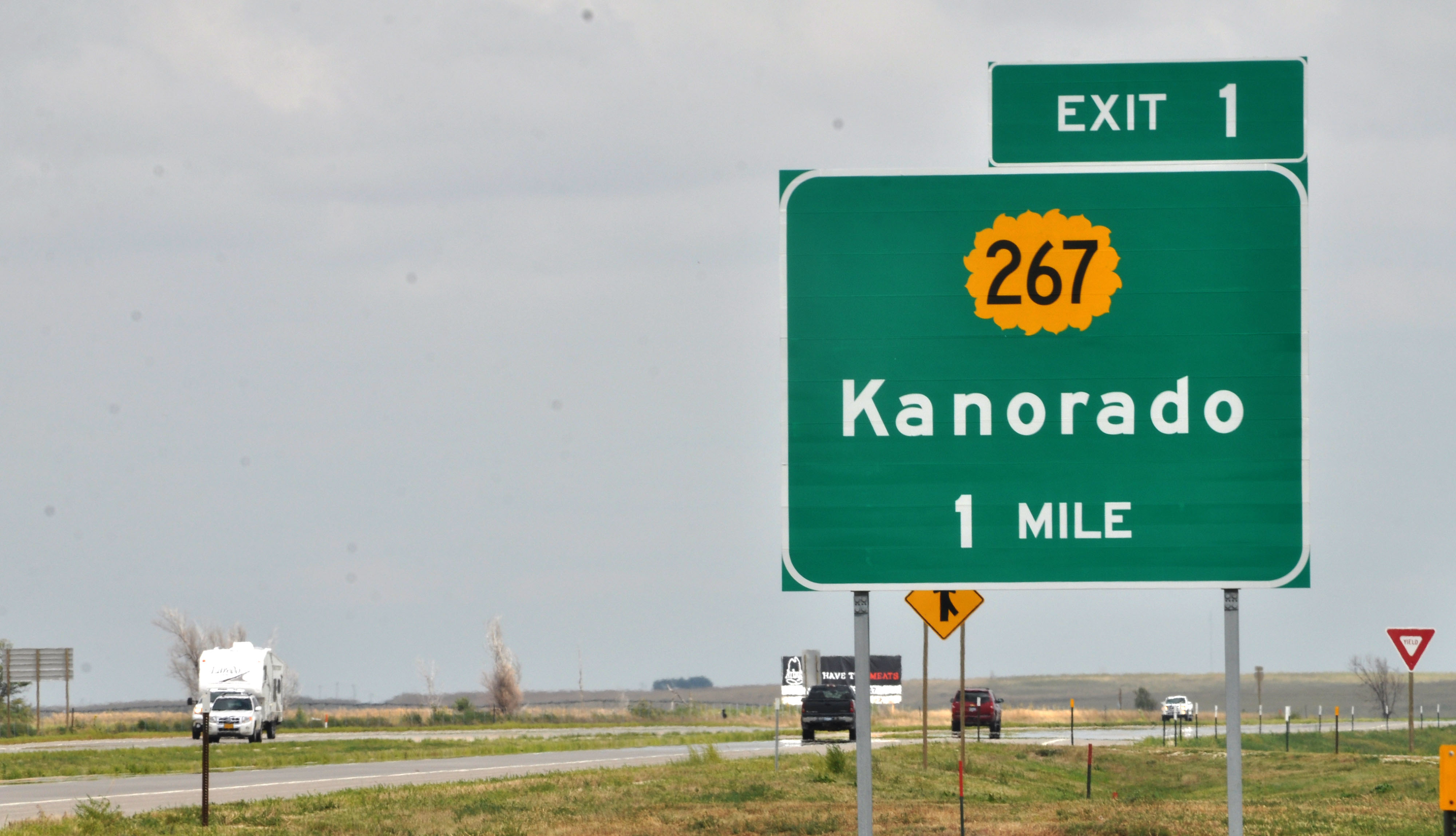
I-70 exit 1 in Kanorado

I-70 runs concurrently with U.S. Highway 24 (US 24) from the Colorado state line until US 24 splits at Levant and runs north of I-70. At Colby, I-70 begins to turn southeast until it reaches Oakley, where US 40 joins with I-70 for a concurrent journey through most of the state. Initially, the route remains high and unusually level as it follows a projection of the High Plains into the state. From exit 140 (Riga Road), the route lowers from the High Plains into the Blue Hills region, as indicated by gentle undulations in the road and the unusual appearance of stone posts in the countryside. Approaching Russell, the route passes over three active sinkholes, the largest being the Crawford Sinkhole at mile 179. Past Russell, the route follows a ridge between the Smoky Hill River and its tributary, the Saline River, where the highway passes through the Smoky Hills Wind Farm. Reaching the county line between Russell and Ellsworth counties, the road begins to traverse the Smoky Hills.

At Salina, I-135 begins its journey southward toward Wichita, and I-70 continues through Abilene and Junction City, where the road begins to run through the Flint Hills.

In Topeka, I-70 intersects an auxiliary route, I-470 before continuing into the city center where the freeway briefly shrinks into a two-lane roadway (one lane in each direction), making it a violation of the interstate standards. The second time the highway intersects Interstate 470, the Kansas Turnpike merges, making I-70 into a toll road. This is one of only two sections of I-70 that are tolled (the other is along the Pennsylvania Turnpike); as of 2024, the maximum toll for cars with K-TAG on this section of I-70 is $2.74. I-70 and the turnpike are concurrent from Topeka to Bonner Springs, the turnpike's eastern terminus. From Bonner Springs to 18th Street and extending on to the Kansas eastern border, the highway is free.

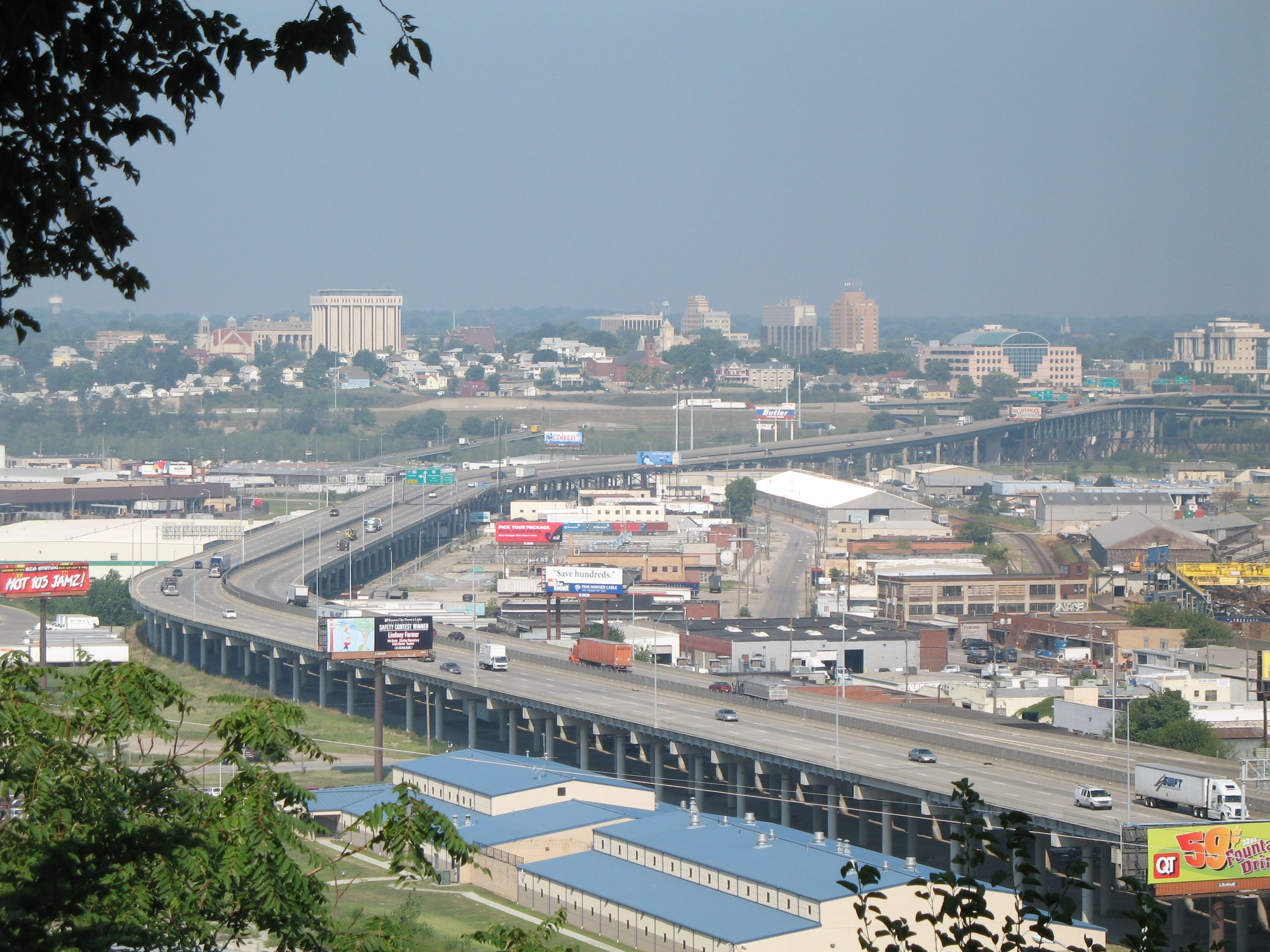
I-70 crossing on the Lewis and Clark Viaduct over the Kansas River from Kansas to Missouri in Kansas City, as seen from Quality Hill

I-70 enters Missouri via a main northern route on the Lewis and Clark Viaduct above the confluence of the Kansas River and Missouri River and a route designated "Alternate I-70" which has signs for I-70 as well as I-670 just south of Kansas City main downtown area.

From exit 275 at Abilene to the Missouri state line, the road is named the Dwight D. Eisenhower–Harry S. Truman Presidential Highway. It retains the designation until exit 16 in Missouri at Independence, the location of Truman's presidential library.

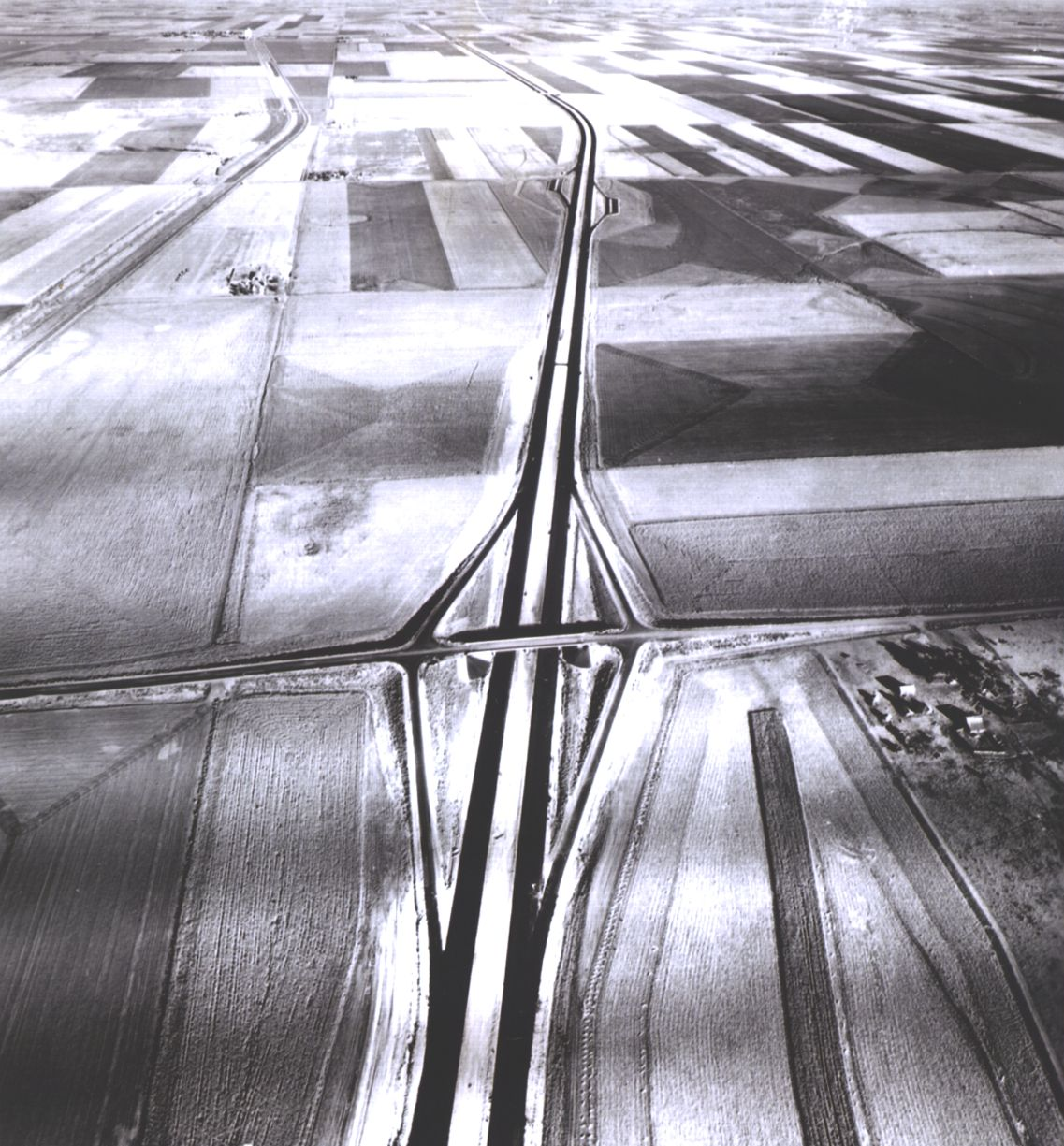
Aerial view of exit 95 east of Grainfield, Kansas, circa 1963

== History ==
The section of I-70 that is the Kansas Turnpike was finished by 1956 and opened to traffic. West of Topeka, the freeway was constructed from Topeka west to Salina at its junction with US 81, as well as from Ogallah to Grainfield. From Salina, the freeway was completed through Wilson the next year. On October 9, 1959, the section of I-70 opened from Junction City west to Abilene through a ribbon-cutting ceremony. A segment of I-70 from Levant through Ogallah was finished by 1965. Another section was built the following year connecting Wilson to Grainfield. The freeway was completed through Kansas with a last section near the Colorado border in 1970.

The Kansas Department of Transportation temporarily closed the Polk-Quincy Viaduct beginning in 2026 for a period of about six months, and I-70 was closed in downtown Topeka between MacVicar Avenue and 6th Street for both directions to convert the viaduct from four to six lanes; all traffic exited at 8th Avenue (westbound) or Topeka Boulevard (eastbound). During the closure, through traffic was diverted to I-470.

In the 2020s, the entire I-70 corridor was designated as an Alternative Fuel Corridor for electric vehicles.

== Exit list ==
Exit numbers correspond to the mileposts where they are located (numbered east from the Colorado border), except for those between Topeka and Kansas City, which are part of the Kansas Turnpike and use its mileposts (numbered nominally north from the Oklahoma border) instead.

County	Location	mi	km	Exit	Destinations	Notes
Sherman	Stateline Township	0.00	0.00		I-70 west / US 24 west – Denver	Continuation into Colorado
Sherman	Stateline Township	1.35	2.17	1	K-267 – Kanorado	
Sherman	Lincoln Township	9.32	15.00	9	County Road 11	
Sherman	Logan Township	12.27	19.75	12	County Road 14	
Sherman	Goodland	17.27	27.79	17	US 24 Bus. east / K-27 – Sharon Springs, St. Francis	
Sherman	Goodland	19.25	30.98	19	US 24 Bus. west – Goodland	
Sherman	Washington Township	27.22	43.81	27	K-253 – Edson	
Thomas	West Hale Township	36.34	58.48	36	K-184 – Brewster	
Thomas	East Hale Township	45.83	73.76	45	US-24 east – Levant	Eastern end of US-24 concurrency
Thomas	Colby	53.81	86.60	53	K-25 – Leoti, Atwood	
Thomas	Morgan Township	54.80	88.19	54	Country Club Drive	
Thomas	North Randall Township	62.73	100.95	62	County Road K	
Thomas	South Randall Township	70.01	112.67	70	US-83 – Oakley, Rexford	
Logan	No major junctions					
Gove	Oakley	75.87	122.10	76	US-40 west – Oakley, Sharon Springs	Western end of US-40 concurrency
Gove	Grinnell Township	79.80	128.43	79	Campus Road	
Gove	Grinnell Township	85.75	138.00	85	K-216 – Grinnell	
Gove	Grainfield Township	93.72	150.83	93	K-23 – Grainfield, Gove	
Gove	Grainfield Township	95.68	153.98	95	K-23 north – Hoxie	Access via unsigned K-23 Spur
Gove	Payne Township	99.67	160.40	99	K-211 – Park	
Gove	Quinter	107.31	172.70	107	Castle Rock Road – Quinter	Former K-212
Trego	Collyer Township	114.93	184.96	115	K-198 north – Collyer	
Trego	Collyer Township	119.84	192.86	120	Voda Road	
Trego	WaKeeney	126.89	204.21	127	US 40 Bus. east / US-283 – WaKeeney, Ness City	
Trego	WaKeeney	127.93	205.88	128	US 40 Bus. west to US-283 north – WaKeeney, Hill City	
Trego	Ogallah Township	135.11	217.44	135	K-147 – Ogallah	
Trego	Ogallah Township	140.23	225.68	140	Riga Road	
Ellis	Ellis	145.29	233.82	145	K-247 – Ellis	
Ellis	Big Creek Township	152.68	245.71	153	Yocemento Avenue	
Ellis	Hays	156.80	252.35	157	US 183 Byp. – Hays, La Crosse	
Ellis	Hays	159.00	255.89	159	US-183 – Hays, Stockton	
Ellis	Big Creek Township	161.31	259.60	161	Commerce Parkway	
Ellis	Big Creek Township	163.35	262.89	163	Toulon Avenue	
Ellis	Herzog Township	168.34	270.92	168	K-255 – Victoria	
Ellis	Herzog Township	172.56	277.71	172	Walker Avenue	
Russell	Big Creek Township	175.56	282.54	175	176th Street – Gorham	Former K-257
Russell	Big Creek–Grant township line	180.56	290.58	180	181st Street	
Russell	Russell	184.54	296.99	184	US-281 – Russell, Hoisington	Former US 40 Bus.
Russell	Grant Township	188.56	303.46	189	189th Street	Former US 40 Bus.
Russell	Center Township	192.56	309.90	193	193rd Street	
Russell	Dorrance	199.09	320.40	199	Dorrance	Former K-231
Ellsworth	Wilson Township	205.48	330.69	206	K-232 – Wilson, Lucas	
Ellsworth	Wilson Township	209.50	337.16	209	Sylvan Grove	
Ellsworth	Columbia Township	215.52	346.85	216	Vesper	
Ellsworth	Sherman Township	218.54	351.71	219	K-14 south – Ellsworth	Western end of K-14 overlap
Ellsworth	Sherman Township	221.44	356.37	221	K-14 north – Lincoln	Eastern end of K-14 overlap
Ellsworth	Garfield Township	224.87	361.89	225	K-156 – Ellsworth, Great Bend	
Lincoln	Madison Township	232.96	374.91	233	Beverly, Carneiro	
Saline	Glendale Township	237.96	382.96	238	Brookville, Tescott	
Saline	Pleasant Valley Township	243.97	392.63	244	Hedville, Culver	
Saline	Elm Creek Township	248.99	400.71	249	Halstead Road	
Saline	Elm Creek Township	250.24	402.72	250A-B	I-135 south / US-81 – Wichita, Concordia	I-135 exits 95A-B
Saline	Salina	252.02	405.59	252	K-143 (Ninth Street)	
Saline	Cambria Township	253.09	407.31	253	Ohio Street	
Saline	Cambria–Dayton township line	259.49	417.61	260	Niles Road	
Dickinson	Solomon	265.94	427.99	266	Solomon Road	Former K-221
Dickinson	Lincoln–Grant township line	272.00	437.74	272	Fair Road	
Dickinson	Abilene	274.54	441.83	275	K-15 – Abilene, Clay Center	
Dickinson	Grant Township	277.09	445.93	277	Jeep Road	
Dickinson	Center Township	280.30	451.10	281	K-43 – Enterprise	
Dickinson	Noble Township	285.54	459.53	286	K-206 – Chapman	
Geary	Smoky Hill Township	289.85	466.47	290	Milford Lake Road	
Geary	Junction City	294.34	473.69	295	US-77 / K-18 west – Marysville, Herington	Western end of K-18 overlap
Geary	Junction City	295.92	476.24	296	US 40 Bus. east (Washington Street)	
Geary	Junction City	297.29	478.44	298	East Street / Chestnut Street	
Geary	Grandview Plaza	298.28	480.04	299	Flinthills Boulevard ( US 40 Bus. / K-57) / J Hill Road	
Geary	Grandview Plaza	299.18	481.48	300	US 40 Bus. west / K-57 – Council Grove	No westbound entrance
Geary	Jefferson Township	300.33	483.33	301	Fort Riley, Marshall Field	
Geary	Jefferson Township	302.28	486.47	303	K-18 east – Manhattan	Eastern end of K-18 overlap
Geary	Jefferson Township	303.42	488.31	304	Humboldt Creek Road	
Geary	Wingfield Township	306.87	493.86	307	McDowell Creek Road	
Geary	Jackson Township	311.22	500.86	311	Moritz Road	
Geary	Jackson Township	313.26	504.14	313	K-177 – Council Grove, Manhattan	
Riley	Zeandale Township	315.44	507.65	316	Deep Creek Road	
Riley	Zeandale Township	317.61	511.14	318	Frontage Road	
Wabaunsee	Wabaunsee Township	321.76	517.82	322	Tallgrass Road	
Wabaunsee	Wabaunsee Township	323.25	520.22	324	Wabaunsee Road	
Wabaunsee	Wabaunsee Township	326.73	525.82	328	K-99 – Wamego, Alma	
Wabaunsee	Wabaunsee–Newbury township line	329.26	529.89	330	K-185 – McFarland	
Wabaunsee	Newbury Township	331.19	533.00	332	Spring Creek Road	
Wabaunsee	Newbury Township	332.18	534.59	333	K-138 – Paxico	
Wabaunsee	Newbury Township	334.28	537.97	335	Snokomo Road	
Wabaunsee	Newbury–Maple Hill township line	337.24	542.74	338	Vera Road	
Wabaunsee	Maple Hill Township	340.22	547.53	341	K-30 – Maple Hill	
Wabaunsee	Maple Hill Township	341.23	549.16	342	Keene-Eskridge Road	
Wabaunsee	Maple Hill Township	342.21	550.73	343	Ranch Road	Private interchange put in for the Brethour Ranch
Shawnee	Dover Township	345.20	555.55	346	Carlson Road	
Shawnee	Dover Township	346.70	557.96	347	West Union Road	
Shawnee	Dover Township	349.22	562.02	350	Valencia Road	
Shawnee	Dover Township	350.24	563.66	351	Frontage Road	Eastbound exit and westbound entrance
Shawnee	Mission Township	352.26	566.91	353	K-4 west (Auburn Road)	Western end of K-4 overlap
Shawnee	Topeka	354.65	570.75	355	I-470 east / US-75 south – Topeka	Western end of US-75 overlap; I-470 exit 1A to 70 east westbound.
Shawnee	Topeka	355.24	571.70	356	Wanamaker Road	
Shawnee	Topeka	356.38– 356.85	573.54– 574.29	357A	Fairlawn Road	Signed as exit 357 eastbound
Shawnee	Topeka	356.38– 356.85	573.54– 574.29	357B	Danbury Lane	Westbound exit only
Shawnee	Topeka	357.16– 357.54	574.79– 575.40	358A	US-75 north - Holton	Eastern end of US-75 overlap; signed as exit 358 eastbound
Shawnee	Topeka	357.16– 357.54	574.79– 575.40	358B	Gage Boulevard	Signed as exit 358 eastbound
Shawnee	Topeka	358.56	577.05	359	MacVicar Avenue	
Shawnee	Topeka	360.23– 360.94	579.73– 580.88	361A	1st Avenue	I-70 closed eastbound to 8th Avenue; all eastbound traffic must use Topeka Boulevard exit; provides access to Topeka Boulevard; eastbound exit and westbound entrance
Shawnee	Topeka	360.23– 360.94	579.73– 580.88	361B	3rd Street / Monroe Street	Eastbound exit and westbound entrance
Shawnee	Topeka	361.04– 361.66	581.04– 582.04	362A	4th Street	Westbound exit and eastbound entrance
Shawnee	Topeka	361.04– 361.66	581.04– 582.04	362B	8th Avenue	I-70 closed westbound to Topeka Boulevard; all westbound traffic must use 8th Avenue exit; signed as exit 362 eastbound
Shawnee	Topeka	361.04– 361.66	581.04– 582.04	362C	10th Avenue / Madison Street	Westbound exit and eastbound entrance
Shawnee	Topeka	362.11	582.76	363	Adams Street / Branner Trafficway	
Shawnee	Topeka	363.08– 363.82	584.32– 585.51	364A	California Avenue	
Shawnee	Topeka	363.08– 363.82	584.32– 585.51	364B	Carnahan Avenue / Deer Creek Trafficway	
Shawnee	Topeka	364.58	586.73	365	Rice Road	
Shawnee	Topeka	365.39	588.04	366	I-470 west / Kansas Turnpike west / US-40 east / K-4 east – Wichita	Eastern end of US-40/K-4 overlap; last eastbound exit before toll
Shawnee	Topeka	366.29	589.49	183	I-470 west / Kansas Turnpike west to I-335 south – South Topeka, Wichita	Western end of Kansas Turnpike overlap; eastern terminus of I-470; westbound exit and eastbound entrance
Shawnee	Tecumseh Township	370.90	596.91	Topeka Service Area		
Douglas	Kanwaka Township	379.96	611.49	197	K-10 east – Lawrence; CR 438 – Lecompton	Access to Lecompton provided by CR-438 (North 1800 Road); to be rebuilt into a system-to-system interchange
Douglas	Lawrence	384.71	619.13	202	To US-59 south – Lawrence	
Douglas	Lawrence	386.25	621.61	204	US-40 / US-59 to US-24 – Lawrence	
Leavenworth	Reno Township	391.71	630.40	Lawrence Service Area		
Leavenworth	Tonganoxie	394.55	634.97	212	Tonganoxie, Eudora	
Wyandotte	Bonner Springs	406.29	653.86	224	US-24 west / US-40 west / US-73 north / K-7 – Bonner Springs, Leavenworth	Western end of US-24/US-40 overlap; westbound exits signed as exit 224A (south) and 224B (north); last westbound exit before toll
Wyandotte	Kansas City	409.19	658.53	410	110th Street – Kansas Speedway	Exit numbers correspond to I-70
Wyandotte	Kansas City	410.48	660.60	411	I-435	I-435 exits 12A-B; signed as exits 411A (south) and 411B (north)
Wyandotte	Kansas City	413.20	664.98	414	78th Street	
Wyandotte	Kansas City	414.35	666.83	415	Turner Diagonal / College Parkway	Diverging Diamond Interchange
Wyandotte	Kansas City	415.93	669.37	417	57th Street	
Wyandotte	Kansas City	417.57	672.01	418	I-635 – St Joseph, Wichita	Signed as exits 418A (north) and 418B (south) eastbound; I-635 exits 4A-B
Wyandotte	Kansas City	418.04	672.77	419	Park Drive / 38th Street	westbound access is part of exit 418
Wyandotte	Kansas City	419.32	674.83	420	US-69 south (18th Street Expressway) / 18th Street north Kansas Turnpike ends	Signed as exits 420A (south) and 420B (north); eastern terminus of Kansas Turnpike
Wyandotte	Kansas City	421.12	677.73	421A	Railroad Yard – No outlet, railroad use only	Westbound exit and eastbound entrance
Wyandotte	Kansas City	421.12	677.73	421B	I-670 east (I-70 Alt.) to I-35 south – St. Louis	Eastbound left exit and westbound entrance
Wyandotte	Kansas City	420.68– 421.33	677.02– 678.06	422A	US-69 north (7th Street Trafficway)	Eastern end of US-69 overlap
Wyandotte	Kansas City	420.68– 421.33	677.02– 678.06	422B	US-169 south (7th Street Trafficway)	Western end of US-169 overlap
Wyandotte	Kansas City	420.68– 421.33	677.02– 678.06	422C	Pacific Avenue	
Wyandotte	Kansas City	420.68– 421.33	677.02– 678.06	422D	Central Avenue	
Wyandotte	Kansas City	421.68– 422.26	678.63– 679.56	423A	5th Street	Eastbound left exit and westbound entrance
Wyandotte	Kansas City	421.68– 422.26	678.63– 679.56	423B	James Street / 3rd Street	Eastbound exit and westbound entrance
Wyandotte	Kansas City	421.68– 422.26	678.63– 679.56	423C	Minnesota Avenue / Washington Boulevard / Lewis and Clark Trail	Westbound exit and eastbound entrance
Wyandotte	Kansas City	421.68– 422.26	678.63– 679.56	423D	Fairfax District	Westbound exit and eastbound entrance
Wyandotte	Kansas City	422.82	680.46		I-70 east / US 24 east / US 40 east / US 169 north / Lewis and Clark Trail – Kansas City, St. Louis	Continuation into Missouri
1.000 mi = 1.609 km; 1.000 km = 0.621 mi: Closed/former; Concurrency terminus; Electronic toll collection; Incomplete access

== Auxiliary routes ==
I-70 has two auxiliary routes in Kansas. I-470 is a loop around the southern side of Topeka that is signed as the Dr. Martin Luther King Jr. Memorial Highway and overlaps the Kansas Turnpike on the southeast side of town. I-670 is an alternate route for I-70 travelers through downtown Kansas City that is signed as the Dillingham Freeway and as Alternate I-70.

Interstate 70
Previous state: Colorado	Kansas	Next state: Missouri
