= K53 =

K53 or K-53 may refer to:

- K-53 (Kansas highway)
- K-53 truck, an American military truck
- Junkers K53, a German military trainer aircraft
- Kushiro Station (Hokkaido)
- Potassium-53, an isotope of potassium
