= Interstate 470 (Kansas) =

Highway in Kansas

Interstate 470
- Dr. Martin Luther King Jr. Memorial Highway
- I-470 highlighted in red

Route information
- Auxiliary route of I-70
- Maintained by KDOT and KTA
- Length: 13.72 mi (22.08 km)
- Existed: October 21, 1960–present
- NHS: Entire route

Major junctions
- West end: I-70 / US-40 / US-75 / K-4 in Topeka
- US-75 in Topeka; I-335 / Kansas Turnpike in Topeka
- East end: I-70 / Kansas Turnpike / US-40 / K-4 in Tecumseh

Location
- Country: United States
- State: Kansas
- Counties: Shawnee

Highway system
- Interstate Highway System; Main; Auxiliary; Suffixed; Business; Future; Kansas State Highway System; Interstate; US; State; Spurs
← I-435	→ I-635

Interstate 470 (I-470) is a 13.72-mile (22.08 km) loop highway that bypasses the downtown area of Topeka, Kansas. I-470 begins at an interchange with I-70 in western Topeka and heads generally southeast, running concurrent with U.S. Highway 75 (US-75). The concurrency with US-75 ends 5.74 miles (9.24 km) later at the Burlingame Road interchange. I-470 becomes part of the Kansas Turnpike at its junction with I-335. From there, the highway heads generally northeast through the southeastern sections of Topeka. After traveling 7.03 miles (11.31 km) as the Kansas Turnpike, I-470 reaches its eastern terminus at I-70. The highway has annual average daily traffic (AADT) values as high as 43,000 west of Gage Boulevard to as low as 10,370 near the eastern terminus. As an Interstate Highway, I-470 is a part of the National Highway System. The non-turnpike portions of the highway are maintained by the Kansas Department of Transportation (KDOT), while the turnpike portion is maintained by the Kansas Turnpike Authority (KTA).

The Kansas Turnpike was opened in the 1950s, comprising the eastern portion of the route. In the late 1950s, construction began on the western portion of I-470, and, on October 21, 1960, the western section of I-470 was dedicated and opened to traffic. In 1982, I-470 was designated as "Martin Luther King Jr. Memorial Highway". The routing of I-470 has not changed since the completion of the highway.

== Route description ==
=== Free segment ===
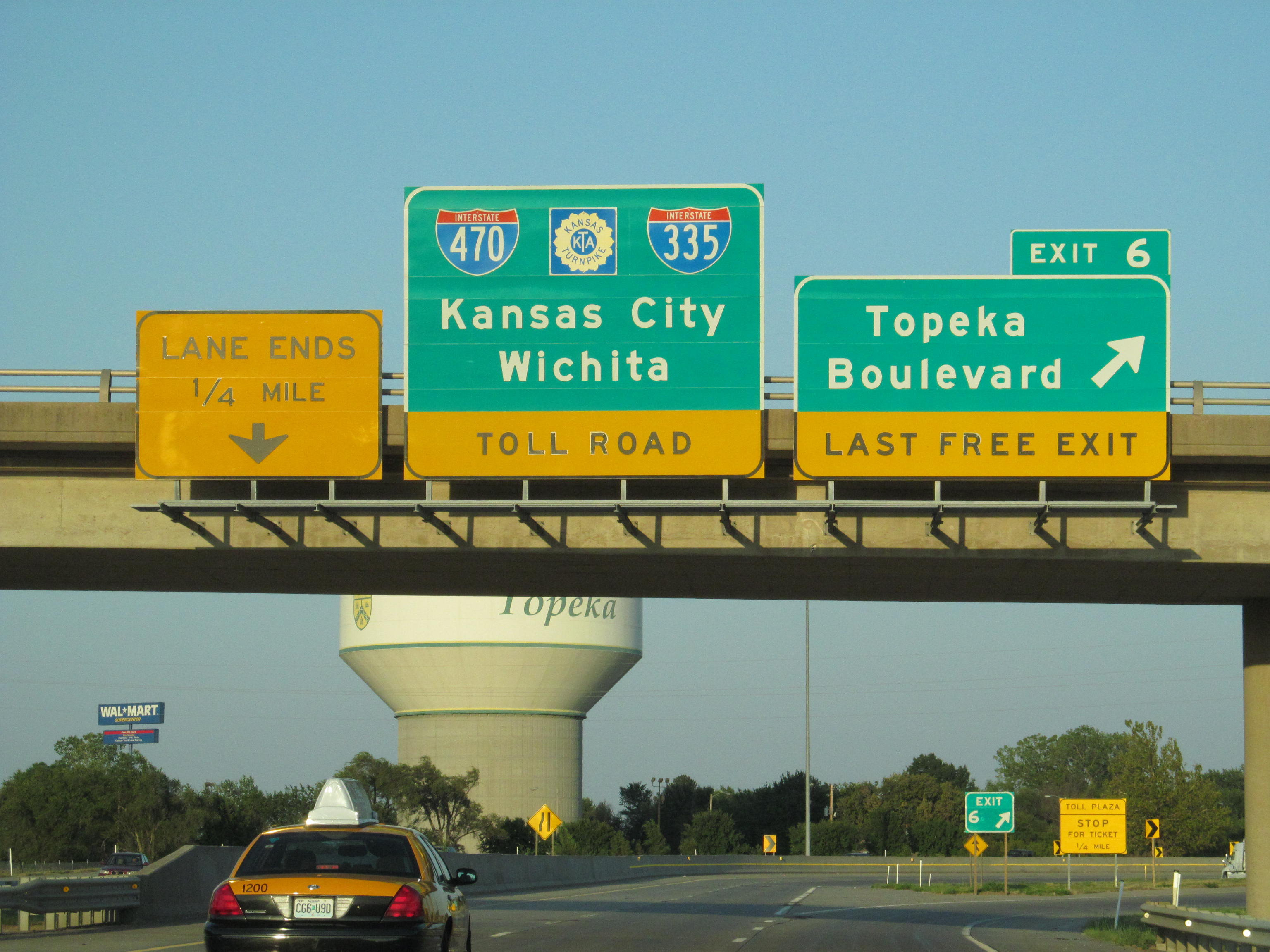
I-470 eastbound at Topeka Boulevard interchange

I-470 begins on the west side of Topeka at a directional T interchange with I-70, US-40, and K-4. US-75 approaches the interchange from the east and joins I-470. The two routes head southeastward along the western edge of the city. Along this stretch of the Interstate, there are three interchanges; Huntoon Street/Wanamaker Road, 21st Street, and 29th Street/Fairlawn Road. Because of both the southeast–northwest alignment of the road and the proximity of two cross-streets, the Huntoon Street/Wanamaker Road and 29th Street/Fairlawn Road interchanges are each made up of two half diamond interchanges, with entrances and exits on two different streets depending on direction. At the Huntoon Street/Wanamaker Road interchange, traffic leaving eastbound I-470 is deposited onto Huntoon Street. Vehicles merging onto eastbound I-470 must access the entrance ramp from Wanamaker Road. The intersection of Huntoon Street and Wanamaker Road is adjacent to the freeway. The 29th Street/Fairlawn Road interchange is constructed similarly to the Huntoon Street/Wanamaker Road interchange, while the 21st Street interchange is a standard diamond interchange. Through southern Topeka, I-470/US-75 curve to the east-southeast where they intersect Gage Boulevard. Further southeast, US-75 splits away from I-470 at a complex interchange with Burlingame Road. Just east of the US-75 interchange, a trumpet interchange provides access to Topeka Boulevard.

=== Kansas Turnpike ===
The highway then merges onto the Kansas Turnpike, starting the tolled portion of the highway. This junction also marks the northern end of I-335. I-470 and the Kansas Turnpike head northeast toward I-70. The tollway continues northeastward through southeastern Topeka, passing near to Lake Shawnee and eventually reaching I-470's terminus at I-70, which the turnpike carries east.

== Maintenance ==
The non-turnpike portion of the freeway is maintained by KDOT. As part of this role, KDOT surveys traffic on Kansas highways in terms of AADT. In 2011, KDOT calculated that as few as 10,400 vehicles used I-470 daily along the Kansas Turnpike near the I-70 interchange and as many as 41,300 vehicles used I-470 daily between the Gage Boulevard interchange and the 29th Street interchange. The portions of I-470 that are part of the Kansas Turnpike fall under the purview of the KTA, which is responsible for operating and maintaining the Kansas Turnpike. Being part of the Interstate Highway System, the entirety of I-470 is listed on the National Highway System, a system of roads that are important to the nation's economy, defense, and mobility.

== History ==
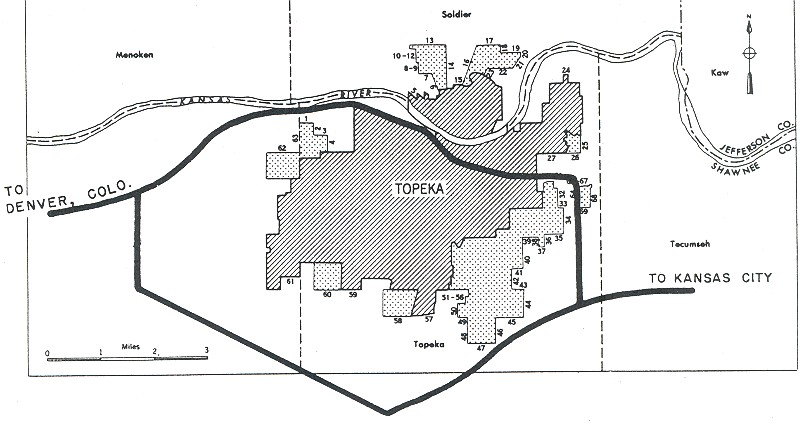
1955 map showing planned Interstate Highways through Topeka

The section of I-470 that now runs along the Kansas Turnpike was opened in 1956 and was the first part of I-470 to be built. After the founding of the Interstate Highway System that same year, several Interstate freeways were planned through Topeka, including I-70 and I-470. Construction began on I-470 after I-70's completion to Topeka. The segment of the I-470 freeway from the I-70 interchange to the Kansas Turnpike, most of which is concurrent with US-75, was built by Koss Construction Company and was under construction until 1960. On October 21, 1960, the western section of I-470 was dedicated by the state highway department and the KTA and opened to traffic. Since completion of the freeway, the route has not been changed. In 1982, I-470 was dedicated as "Martin Luther King Jr. Memorial Highway".

== Exit list ==
The exits on the Kansas Turnpike portion of I-470 follow the Turnpike's mileposts. The entire route is in Topeka, Shawnee County.

mi	km	Exit	Destinations	Notes
0.00	0.00	1A	I-70 / US-40 / K-4 / US-75 – Salina, Kansas City	Western terminus; exit 355 on I-70; exit 1A is for 70 east; western end of US-75 concurrency
1.05	1.69	1B	Huntoon Street / Wanamaker Road	
2.22	3.57	2	21st Street	
3.35	5.39	3	29th Street / Fairlawn Road	
4.30	6.92	4	Gage Boulevard	Access to Discovery Center and VA Medical Center
5.74	9.24	5	US-75 south / Burlingame Road	Eastern end of US-75 concurrency; access to Washburn University and Mulvane Art Museum
6.6	10.6	6	Topeka Boulevard	Last free exit eastbound; former US-75; also provides access to Kansas Avenue; access to Kansas Expocenter
6.69	10.77	177	I-335 south / Kansas Turnpike south – Emporia, Wichita	Western end of Kansas Turnpike concurrency; northern terminus of I-335
13.72	22.08	182	I-70 west / US-40 / K-4 – Topeka, Valley Falls	Eastbound exit and westbound entrance
13.72	22.08		I-70 east / Kansas Turnpike east – Lawrence, Kansas City	Eastern terminus; eastern end of Kansas Turnpike concurrency
1.000 mi = 1.609 km; 1.000 km = 0.621 mi: Concurrency terminus; Incomplete access; Tolled
