= K-53 (Kansas highway) =

State highway in Kansas, U.S.

K-53
- K-53 highlighted in red

Route information
- Maintained by KDOT and the city of Mulvane
- Length: 6.177 mi (9.941 km)
- Existed: 1927–present

Major junctions
- West end: US-81 south of Wichita
- I-35 / Kansas Turnpike near the Kansas Star Casino
- East end: K-15 by Mulvane

Location
- Country: United States
- State: Kansas
- Counties: Sumner

Highway system
- Kansas State Highway System; Interstate; US; State; Spurs
← K-52	→ US-54

K-53 is a 6.177-mile-long (9.941 km) state highway in the U.S. state of Kansas. Located entirely within Sumner County, K-53's western terminus is at U.S. Route 81 (US-81) south of Wichita and the eastern terminus is at an interchange with K-15 by Mulvane. Along the way, K-53 intersects Interstate 35 (I-35), also known as the Kansas Turnpike, at exit 33. The highway travels mostly through farmlands with the exception of inside Mulvane and is a two-lane road its entire length.

Before state highways were numbered in Kansas there were auto trails. The western terminus follows the former Meridian Highway and Southwest Trail. K-53 was designated a state highway by the Kansas State Highway Commission by 1927. Its alignment has remained the same since, except for minor realignments near the crossing of the Arkansas River. Between 1986 and 1987, an interchange was built to provide access to the Kansas Turnpike and I-35.

== Route description ==
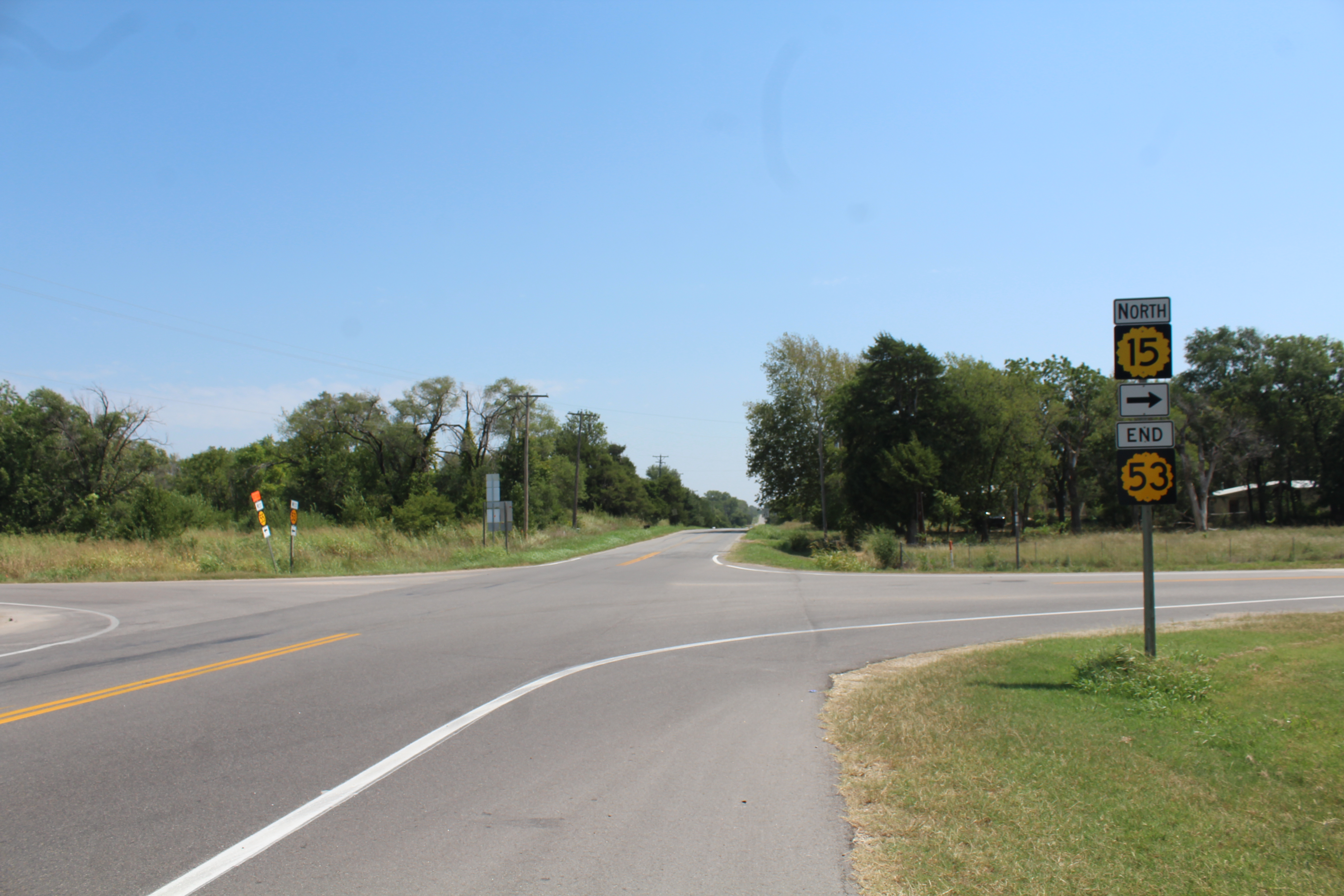
The Eastern terminus of K-53 at K-15 in Mulvane

K-53 begins at US-81 on the Sedgwick–Sumner county line. It travels east through flat rural farmlands and after about 0.53 miles (0.85 km) passes under I-35 and Kansas Turnpike. The highway continues about 0.1 miles (0.16 km) then intersects a road that connects to exit 33 of I-35 and the Kansas Turnpike. K-53 continues for 0.42 miles (0.68 km) then crosses Cowskin Creek and becomes surrounded by trees. The highway then passes to the north of a group of houses then transitions back to flat open farmlands. It continues to straddle the county line until it crosses the Arkansas River about 1.9 miles (3.1 km) later. K-53 then turns southeast into Sumner County, remaining there the remainder of its length. The highway then curves east and enters the city of Mulvane becoming West Bridge Street. It continues another 0.3 miles (0.48 km) to an at-grade crossing with a BNSF Railway track then curves north and becomes 1st Street. K-53 continues for about 0.2 miles (0.32 km) then turns east onto Main Street. The highway continues for 0.73 miles (1.17 km) where it passes under a BNSF Railway track and exits Mulvane. The road continues a short distance and reaches a partial cloverleaf interchange with K-15.

The Kansas Department of Transportation (KDOT) tracks the traffic levels on its highways. On K-53 in 2017, they determined that on average the traffic varied from 1,900 vehicles per day near the eastern terminus to 4,470 vehicles per day in Mulvane. K-53 is not included in the National Highway System. The National Highway System is a system of highways important to the nation's defense, economy, and mobility. K-53 is connected to the National Highway System at its intersection with I-35 and at its eastern terminus at K-15. The entire route is paved with partial design bituminous pavement. The entire 1.278-mile (2.057 km) section of K-53 within Mulvane is maintained by the city.

== History ==
=== Early roads ===
Before state highways were numbered in Kansas, there were auto trails, which were an informal network of marked routes that existed in the United States and Canada in the early part of the 20th century. K-53's western terminus was part of the South West Trail, which ran from El Paso, Texas to Chicago, Illinois; it was also part of the Meridian Highway, which ran from Laredo, Texas north to Pembina, North Dakota. The Meridian Highway was formed in 1911 in Kansas.

=== Establishment and realignments ===
K-53 was designated as a state highway by the Kansas State Highway Commission by 1927, to a highway extending from US-81 east to K-15 in Mulvane. In an August 24, 1949, resolution, it was approved to slightly realign K-53 near the crossing of the Arkansas River. Then in an August 13, 1952, resolution, K-53 was realigned again by the Arkansas River due to a new bridge being built across the river.

K-15, with which K-53 intersects at its eastern terminus, originally entered Mulvane from the east along East Main Street, then turned north at K-53 onto North Second Avenue and exited the city. In an October 28, 1953, resolution, it was approved to build a new alignment of K-15, from where it turned west towards Mulvane (East 119th Street), north to Derby. In early February 1954, the State Highway Commission approved a bid of $78,210 (equivalent to $937,648 in 2025) for grading to T.F. Marbut of Emporia and a bid of $69,965 (equivalent to $838,800 in 2025) for building of bridges to E.W. Geiger of Topeka for a roughly four-mile (6.4 km) section of K-15 from Derby southeast towards Mulvane. Then, on November 29, the commission approved a bid of $34,040 (equivalent to $408,100 in 2025) for grading to Harry Henery of Ottawa and a bid of $67,875 (equivalent to $813,743 in 2025) for building of three bridges to O.G. Brommer of Belleville for the remaining 1.3-mile (2.1 km) section of K-15 toward Mulvane. By 1956, the new alignment of K-15 was complete, and at that time, K-53 was extended east along the former section of K-15 (East Main Street) to the new alignment. When the Kansas Turnpike was completed in 1956, there was no connection with K-53; between 1986 and 1987, exit 33 was completed along the turnpike to provide a connection between the two highways.

== Major junctions ==
County	Location	mi	km	Destinations	Notes
Sedgwick–Sumner county line	Salem–Belle Plain township line	0.000	0.000	US-81 – Wellington, Wichita	Western terminus; road continues west as 119th Street South
Sedgwick–Sumner county line	Salem–Belle Plain township line	0.658	1.059	To I-35 / Kansas Turnpike	Access via connector road; exit 33 on I-35/Kansas Tpke.
Sumner	Mulvane	6.177	9.941	K-15 – Wichita, Winfield	Eastern terminus; partial cloverleaf interchange; road continues east as 119th Street South
1.000 mi = 1.609 km; 1.000 km = 0.621 mi: Tolled
