= Kansas Highway Patrol =

Law enforcement agency in Kansas, U.S.

- Patch of the Kansas Highway Patrol

- Logo of the Kansas Highway Patrol

- Badge of the Kansas Highway Patrol

- Flag of Kansas
- Abbreviation: KHP
- Motto: Service · Courtesy · Protection

Agency overview
- Formed: 1937; 89 years ago
- Preceding agency: Kansas Motor Vehicle Inspectors
- Employees: 738 (2023)
- Annual budget: $110,457,688 (2023)
- Legal personality: State agency

Jurisdictional structure
- Operations jurisdiction: Kansas, US
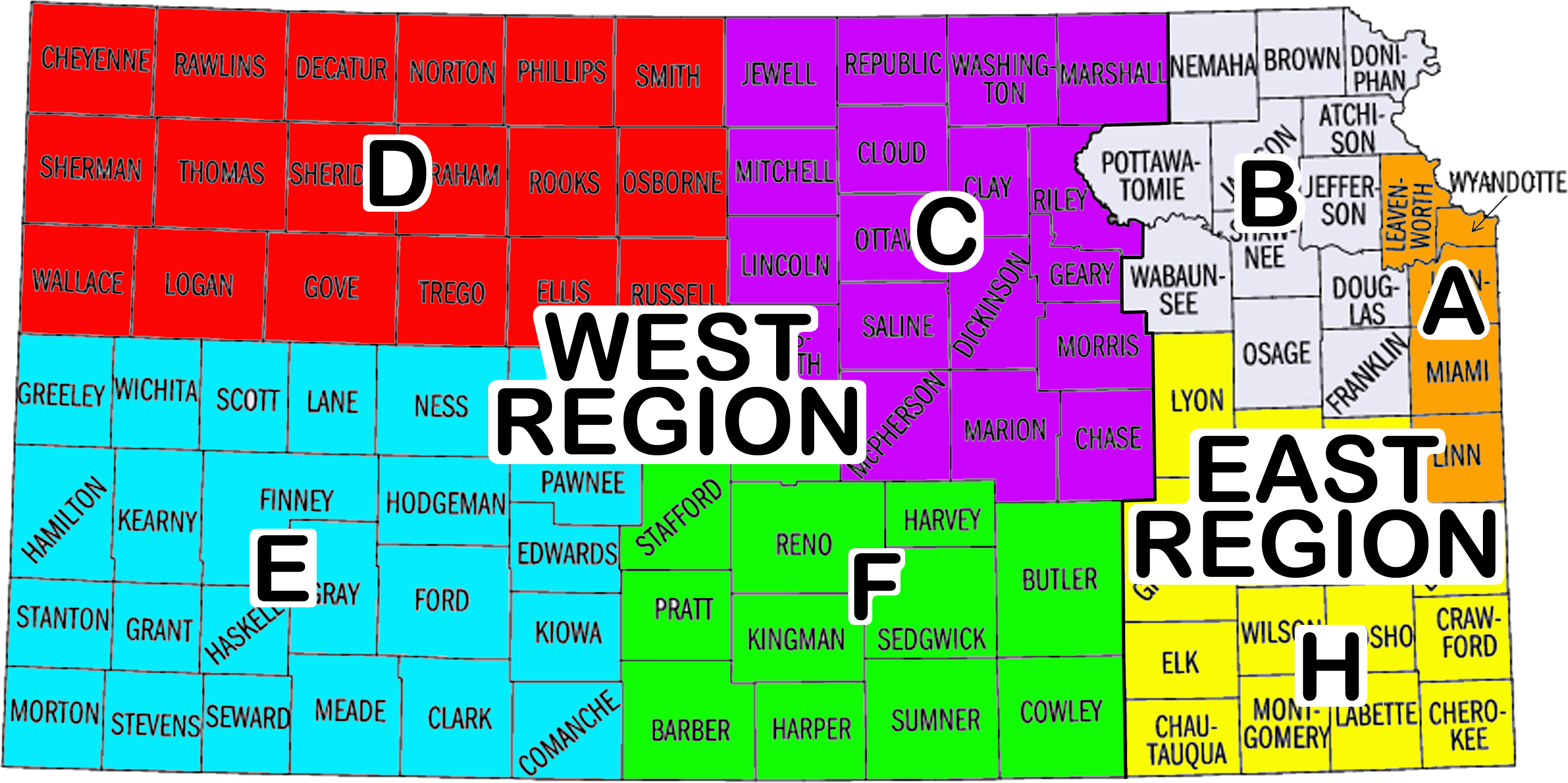
- Kansas Highway Patrol Troop Map
- Area: 82,277 square miles (213,100 km^{2})
- Population: 2,937,150 (2022 est.)
- Legal jurisdiction: (Kansas) Statewide
- Primary governing body: Government of Kansas
- Secondary governing body: Governor of Kansas
- Constituting instrument: K.S.A. Ch. 74, Art. 21

Operational structure
- Headquarters: Topeka, Kansas
- Sworn members: 478 (authorised, as of 2023)
- Civilian members: 271 Civilian members (2023)
- Agency executive: Colonel Erik Smith, Superintendent

Facilities
- Troops / Units: 27

Notables
- Award: CALEA TRI-ARC Award

Website
- kansashighwaypatrol.org

The Kansas Highway Patrol (KHP) is the highway patrol agency for the U.S. state of Kansas. While the patrol's primary focus is maintaining the safety of State, Federal and Interstate highways, it also is charged with providing support for county agencies when tactical, aerial or other specialized services are needed. The Kansas Highway Patrol has statewide jurisdiction, and frequently assists other agencies with emergency calls for service.

== History ==
In 2011, the KHP purchased the last-produced Ford Crown Victoria Police Interceptor for its fleet.

=== Morale controversy ===
In 2014, amidst many allegations of abuse of power and inconsistent work practices resulting in overall low morale, the University of Kansas School of Business proctored a thorough survey of all KHP Employees that were willing to participate. The results of the survey revealed that the majority held great loyalty to the agency, but believed upper-level command staff needlessly doled out disciplinary actions to those they personally disliked, showed favoritism during promotional processes, and were generally incompetent when it came to making important decisions regarding the overall direction of the patrol. Colonel Ernest Garcia and Lieutenant Colonel Alan Stoecklein were both mentioned by name multiple times in an open-ended section at the end of the survey where employees could comment freely. Kansas State Troopers Association President Mitch Mellick said that the survey revealed concerns that had long been held by troopers across the state regarding labor practices and benefits. Lieutenant Colonel Stoecklein soon thereafter announced his retirement, effective September 15, 2014 and Colonel Ernest Garcia announced he was leaving the agency on January 5, 2015.

== Organization ==
The Kansas Highway Patrol is under the direction of the superintendent, who holds the rank of colonel. The superintendent is appointed by the Governor of Kansas. The superintendent appoints an assistant superintendent who holds the rank of lieutenant colonel to assist them. Under the assistant superintendent are five executive commanders who hold the rank of major. These officers comprise the executive command staff of the Patrol.

The Patrol is organized into several divisions, and each are overseen by an executive commander. Each division or region is further divided by its geographical area of responsibility (known as a "troop") or its function. Each troop or functional group is overseen by a commander who holds the rank of captain. Administrative groups are overseen by a civilian director. Each troop is further divided into "zones" of one or several counties. Each zone is overseen by a field supervisor who holds the rank of lieutenant.

Kansas Highway Patrol Organization
Division	Troop	Headquarters	Major Duties	Areas of Responsibility
East Region	Troop A	Olathe, Kansas	Law enforcement	Kansas City Metropolitan Area: Johnson County, Leavenworth County, Miami County, and Wyandotte County
East Region	Troop B	Topeka, Kansas	Law enforcement	Northeast Kansas: Atchison County, Brown County, Doniphan County, Douglas County, Franklin County, Jackson County, Jefferson County, Nemaha County, Osage County, Pottawatomie County, Shawnee County, and Wabaunsee County
East Region	Troop K	Topeka, Kansas	Capitol Police	Kansas State Capitol, Kansas Governor's Mansion, and state properties in Topeka
East Region	Fleet Operations	Topeka, Kansas	Vehicle procurement, issue, maintenance, and sales	Statewide
North Region	Troop C	Salina, Kansas	Law enforcement	North central Kansas: Chase County, Clay County, Cloud County, Dickinson County, Ellsworth County, Geary County, Jewell County, Lincoln County, Marion County, Marshall County, McPherson County, Mitchell County, Morris County, Ottawa County, Republic County, Riley County, Saline County, and Washington County
North Region	Troop D	Hays, Kansas	Law enforcement	Northwest Kansas: Cheyenne County, Decatur County, Ellis County, Gove County, Graham County, Logan County, Norton County, Osborne County, Phillips County, Rawlins County, Rooks County, Russell County, Sheridan County, Sherman County, Smith County, Thomas County, Trego County, and Wallace County
North Region	Troop G	Wichita, Kansas	Law enforcement on the Kansas Turnpike	I-35 from the Oklahoma state line to Emporia, I-335 from Emporia to Topeka, I-470 in southeastern Topeka, and I-70 from Topeka to Kansas City
North Region	Troop I	Topeka, Kansas	Motor Carrier Safety Assistance Program (MCSAP) and Critical Highway Accident Response Team (CHART)	Statewide
South Region	Troop E	Garden City, Kansas	Law enforcement	Southwest Kansas: Clark County, Comanche County, Edwards County, Finney County, Ford County, Grant County, Gray County, Greeley County, Hamilton County, Haskell County, Hodgeman County, Kearny County, Kiowa County, Lane County, Meade County, Morton County, Ness County, Pawnee County, Rush County, Scott County, Seward County, Stanton County, Stevens County, and Wichita County
South Region	Troop F	Wichita, Kansas	Law enforcement	South central Kansas: Barber County, Barton County, Butler County, Cowley County, Harper County, Harvey County, Kingman County, Pratt County, Reno County, Rice County, Sedgwick County, Stafford County, and Sumner County
South Region	Troop H	Chanute, Kansas	Law enforcement	Southeast Kansas: Allen County, Anderson County, Bourbon County, Chautauqua County, Cherokee County, Coffey County, Crawford County, Elk County, Greenwood County, Labette County, Linn County, Lyon County, Montgomery County, Neosho County, Wilson County, and Woodson County
South Region	Emergency Operations / Homeland Security	Topeka, Kansas	Administration of the agency's Homeland Security Grant Program	Statewide
South Region	Public and Governmental Affairs	Topeka, Kansas	Public information, recruiting, research, and legislative representation	Statewide
South Region	Accreditation	Topeka, Kansas	Establishing CALEA accreditation and maintaining compliance	Statewide
Training Center	Troop J	Salina, Kansas	Intra-agency training, inter-agency training, and recruit academy	Statewide
Special Operations	Troop S	Topeka, Kansas	Special Response Team (SRT) and Police Service Dog Unit (PSDU)	Statewide
Special Operations	Troop N	Topeka, Kansas	Domestic Highway Enforcement Team (DHET), DEA Task Force, Joint Terrorism Task Force (JTTF), Kansas Intelligence Fusion Center (KIFC), and evidence management	Statewide
Special Operations	Troop T	Topeka, Kansas	Aircraft operations	Statewide
Communications	Troop M	Salina, Kansas	Communications and CJIS	Statewide
Administrative Services	Troop V	Topeka, Kansas	Motor vehicle enforcement	Statewide
Administrative Services	Fiscal Management	Topeka, Kansas	Budgeting and accounting	Statewide
Administrative Services	Human Resources	Topeka, Kansas	Human resource management	Statewide
Administrative Services	Information Technology	Topeka, Kansas	Information technology management	Statewide
Administrative Services	Records	Topeka, Kansas	Records management	Statewide
Assistant Superintendent's Office	Legal Counsel	Topeka, Kansas	Legal affairs	Statewide
Superintendent's Office	Professional Standards Unit	Topeka, Kansas	Internal affairs	Statewide
Superintendent's Office	Troop L	Topeka, Kansas	Protective Services Unit	Statewide

== Rank structure ==
Title	Insignia	Description
Superintendent (Colonel)		The Superintendent holds the Rank of colonel and is appointed by the Governor of Kansas to be the professional head of the Department
Assistant Superintendent (Lieutenant Colonel)		The Assistant Superintendent holds the Rank of lieutenant colonel and is second-in-command of Patrol.The Assistant Superintendent is appointed by the Superintendent
Major		Majors are Regional and Division Commanders
Captain		Captains are Troop Commanders
Lieutenant		Lieutenants are First Line Supervisors
Technical Trooper		Rank held by veteran Troopers assigned to a technical specialty (e.g. Bomb Technicians, Aircraft Pilots, Canine Handlers, Task Force Officers, Commercial Vehicle Enforcement troopers, etc.).
Master Trooper		Rank attained by Trooper after completion of 5 years of service and completion of advanced professional training.
Trooper		Rank attained by Recruits upon successful completion of the training academy, responsible for field law enforcement patrol.
Trooper Trainee (Recruit)		This rank is held by law enforcement officers while attending the KHP training academy.

== Pay and pensions ==
Officers of the Kansas Highway Patrol begin their career as trooper trainees in the training academy at a base hourly rate. Upon graduation, a pay increase occurs, followed by another the beginning of their fourth year. Upon their fifth year, troopers are eligible for promotion to Master or Technical Trooper with an accompanying increase in pay. Additional years of service and experience qualify troopers for promotion to lieutenant (pay grade 38), captain (pay grade 40), and major (pay grade 42).

Kansas Highway Patrol Trooper Pay Structure
Rank	Time in Rank	Pay	Pay Grade	Pay Step
Trooper Trainee	During academy training	$25.68 per hour	27	14
Trooper	0-3 Years	$28.31 per hour	30	12
Trooper	4-5 Years	$29.73 per hour	30	14
Master/Technical Trooper	0-3 Years	$31.22 per hour	35	6
Master/Technical Trooper	4-5 Years	$32.78 per hour	35	8
Master/Technical Trooper	6-8 Years	$34.42 per hour	35	10
Master/Technical Trooper	9-10 Years	$36.13 per hour	35	12
Master/Technical Trooper	11-13 Years	$37.95 per hour	35	14
Master/Technical Trooper	14-15 Years	$39.84 per hour	35	16
Master/Technical Trooper	16+ Years	$41.81 per hour	35	18

Troopers' retirement is administered by the Kansas Public Employees Retirement System (KPERS) which provides a defined benefit plan, the Kansas Police and Firemen's Retirement System (KP&F). Contributions are made on a pre-tax basis each pay period, with 7.15% of gross earnings withdrawn automatically. Tier I retirees (those employees who were enrolled in KP&F before July 1, 1989 and did not choose Tier II coverage) and Tier II retirees (all employees hired on or before July 1, 1989 or those who were hired earlier and chose Tier II coverage) may retire and are vested at different times.

KP&F Retirement Service and Age Requirements
Tier I	Tier II	Tier I Transfer	Tier II Transfer
Age 55 with 20 years of service	Age 50 with 25 years of service	Age 50 with 25 years of service	Age 50 with 25 years of service
Any age with 32 years of service	Age 55 with 20 years of service		Age 55 with 20 years of service
	Age 60 with 15 years of service		Age 60 with 15 years of service

In addition to the provided pension, employees are eligible to enroll in the Kansas Public Employees Retirement System (KPERS) 457(b) deferred compensation plan, known as KPERS 457.

== Officers of the agency ==
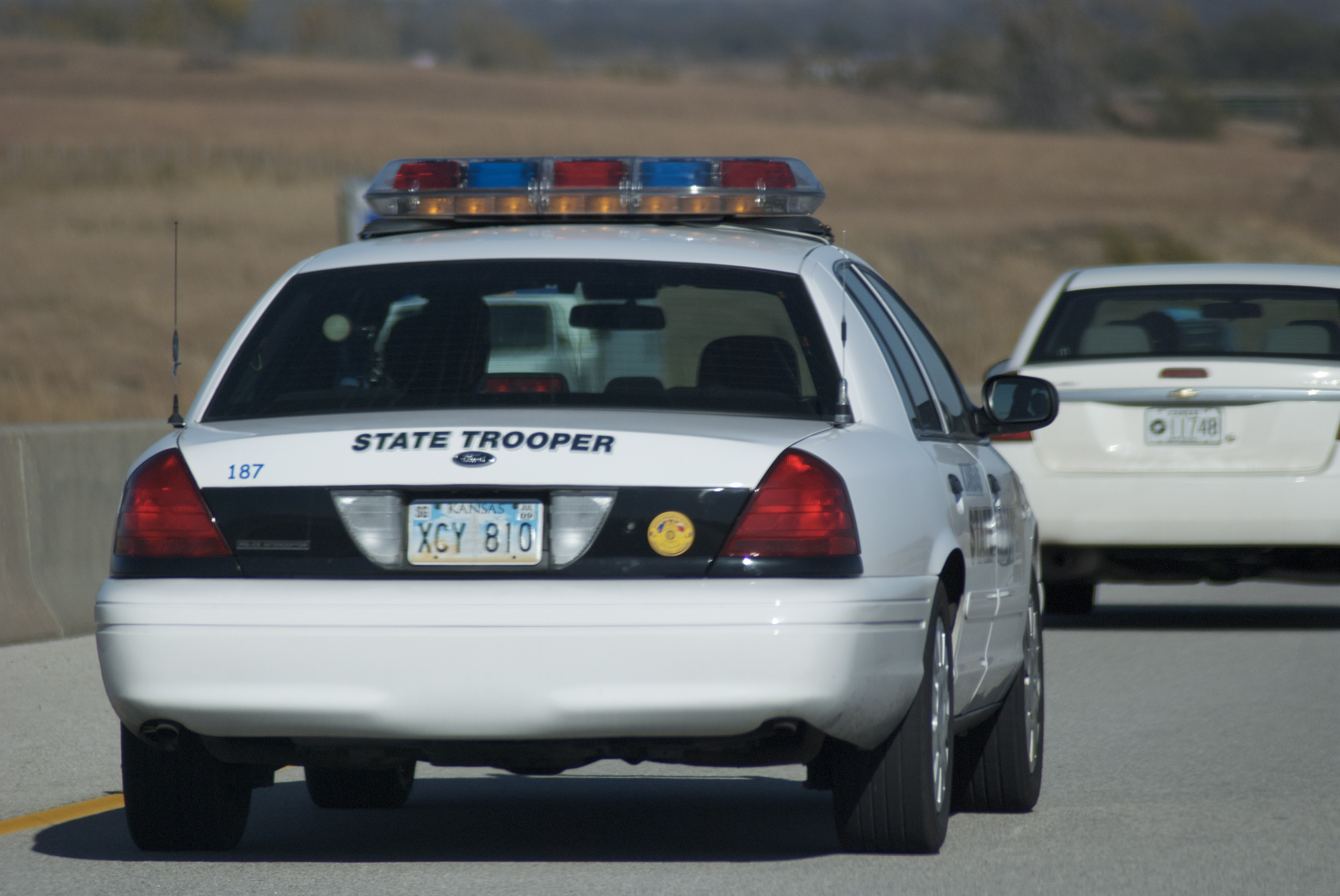
Kansas Trooper in a Ford Crown Victoria

Kansas Highway Patrol Bell 407

=== State Troopers ===
State troopers are certified law enforcement officers who enforce Kansas laws. Troopers have law enforcement jurisdiction throughout the state.

=== Kansas Capitol Police ===
The Kansas Capitol Police, Kansas Highway Patrol TROOP K, as they are known today, are members of a specialty Troop of the Kansas Highway Patrol. The Capitol Police originally became part of the Kansas Highway Patrol in 1976, under the designation of Capitol Area Security Patrol, or C.A.S.P.

In the early days of C.A.S.P. in 1955 the Kansas Department of administration authorized a police force to patrol the downtown state complex area in Topeka Kansas, the police officers of this special unit were statutorily only allowed to enforce laws on or about state property; leaving them powerless to act on a violation of the law when traveling from one property to another. Thru the years some officers came to Troop K from the Highway Patrol academy, but many were trained thru KLETC or with the Topeka Police Department.

In 1995 The Kansas Legislature gave county wide law enforcement jurisdiction to the Capitol Area Security Patrol, and several years thereafter full statewide jurisdiction. With this added responsibility and jurisdiction and the expanding role of the C.A.S.P. in the Capitol Complex and across the state, legislation was also passed to officially change the name of the unit from C.A.S.P. to the Kansas Capitol Police.

During this time all Capitol Police Officers were held to the same high standards as all uniformed Troopers of the Kansas Highway Patrol. Officers were issued the same equipment, firearms, vehicles, and required to follow all KHP policies and procedures along with promoting and presenting the professionalism of the Kansas Highway Patrol.

Capitol Police Officers were giving safety training across the state in Crime Prevention, Women's Self Defense, Emergency Evacuation Training, Active Shooter Training, and providing agency security reviews and recommendations on security upgrades. Capitol Police Officers were assisting with training classes at the KHP academy for yearly in-service, Cadet Law, collegiate law, and new Trooper recruit training.

The same standards were followed in hiring of new Capitol Police Officers. All Troop K Officers attended required in-service and scheduled yearly training hours at the KHP academy, along with Troop training and firearms training.

In 2025 all remaining KHP designated full time LEO 1,2, and 3 Officers from the Motor Carrier and Capitol Police ranks were Re-designated to the Trooper ranks.

Troop K, and the Kansas Turnpike Authority ( KTA Troop G ) are the only two Kansas Highway Patrol Troops, that provide 24-hour, 7-day-a-week Dispatch and law Enforcement coverage. These Troops have their own separate Dispatchers, for the Troops individual mission. Both Troops work with Central Dispatch, ( Troop M ) Central Communications in Salina, for any additional assistance or coordination.

The coverage for Troop K currently entails answering calls for service/patrolling over 100 state properties in Shawnee County Kansas, assisting other law enforcement agencies, criminal investigations, traffic accidents, intervening in crimes in progress, and traffic enforcement. The Capitol Police are also empowered with providing uniformed protection at the governor's mansion, the statehouse, the insurance building, and the judicial center, along with several additional areas of responsibility.

== Equipment ==
Current Firearms
Name	Type	Caliber	Origin	Notes
Glock 17 Gen 5	Pistol	9mm	Austria	Standard Issue
Glock 19	Pistol	9mm	Austria	Executive Protection Detail & Task Force Troopers
SIG Sauer P226	Pistol	.40 S&W	Germany	Kansas Turnpike (Troop G) Troopers
Remington 870	Shotgun	12 Gauge	United States	Standard Issue
Mossberg 500	Shotgun	12 Gauge	United States	Kansas Turnpike (Troop G) Troopers
Colt M4	Patrol Rifle	5.56mm	United States	Standard Issue to all law enforcement officers
H&K 416	Tactical Rifle	5.56mm	Germany	Special Response Team (SRT)
SIG Sauer MPX	Submachine Gun	9mm	Germany	Executive Protection Detail
H&K MP5SD	Submachine Gun	9mm	Germany	Special Response Team (SRT)

=== Previous firearms ===
The last revolver issued was the Smith & Wesson Model 686 .357 Magnum revolver. In 1991, the SIG Sauer P220 .45 ACP was the first semi-automatic pistol carried by the agency until it was replaced in 1998 by the Glock 21 .45 ACP pistol. In 2009, the agency was one of the first in the United States to adopt the Glock 21SF (Short Frame) series sidearms (the other state agency to adopt the Glock 21SF shortly after would be the Nebraska State Patrol who still uses them). The Glock 21SF was first issued with a standard Level 1 or Level 2 high gloss leather holster, but the agency would later adopt the Safariland 6360 Level 3 holsters in around 2013–2014. In late 2018, the Patrol transitioned to 9mm with the Glock 17 Gen 5 carried in a Safariland 6360 Level 3 holster. The transition to 9mm was based upon Federal Bureau of Investigation testing which demonstrated a marked ballistic improvement upon earlier technology.

- Current Vehicles
  Vehicle Make	Vehicle Model
  Dodge	Charger
  Dodge	Durango
  Ford	Explorer
  Ford	F-150
  Chevrolet	Tahoe
  Ford	Expedition
  Lenco	BearCat
- Current Aircraft
  Aircraft Make	Aircraft Model	Number in Use
  Bell	407	1
  Cessna	R182 Skylane RG	1
  Cessna	206	3
  Beechcraft	Super King Air 350	1

=== Vehicle issuance and retirement ===
Each trooper is issued their own patrol vehicle. Patrol vehicles are retired before reaching 50,000 miles and are subsequently resold to other governmental agencies at a reduced price.

== Fallen officers ==
Since the establishment of the Kansas Highway Patrol, 10 officers have died in the line of duty.

Officer	Date of death	Details
Trooper Maurice R. Plummer	Saturday, December 16, 1944	Automobile accident
Trooper Jimmie D. Jacobs	Tuesday, October 6, 1959	Automobile accident
Trooper John B. McMurray	Wednesday, December 9, 1964	Vehicular assault
Lieutenant Bernard C. Hill	Sunday, May 28, 1967	Automobile accident
Sergeant Eldon K. Miller	Friday, January 19, 1968	Gunfire
Trooper James Donald Thornton	Tuesday, October 2, 1973	Gunfire
Trooper Conroy G. O'Brien	Wednesday, May 24, 1978	Gunfire
Trooper Ferdinand Frederick Pribbenow	Saturday, July 11, 1981	Gunfire
Master Trooper Larry Lee Huff	Friday, November 26, 1993	Automobile accident
Master Trooper Dean Allen Goodheart	Wednesday, September 6, 1995	Struck by vehicle

== See also ==
- List of law enforcement agencies in Kansas
- State police
- Highway patrol
- Kansas Bureau of Investigation
