= Kansas Turnpike =

Highway in Kansas

Kansas Turnpike
- Kansas Turnpike highlighted in red

Route information
- Maintained by Kansas Turnpike Authority
- Length: 236 mi (380 km)
- Existed: October 1956–present
- Component highways: I-35 from the Oklahoma state line to Emporia; I-335 from Emporia to Topeka; I-470 in southeastern Topeka; I-70 from Topeka to Kansas City

Major junctions
- South end: I-35 at the Oklahoma state line
- I-135 / I-235 / US-81 in Wichita; I-35 / US-50 in Emporia; I-470 / US-75 in Topeka; I-70 / US-40 / K-4 in Topeka
- East end: I-70 / US-24 / US-40 / US-69 in Kansas City

Location
- Country: United States
- State: Kansas
- Counties: Sumner, Sedgwick, Butler, Chase, Lyon, Wabaunsee, Osage, Shawnee, Douglas, Leavenworth, Wyandotte

Highway system
- Kansas State Highway System; Interstate; US; State; Spurs
← US-283	I-335	→ US-383

The Kansas Turnpike is a 236-mile (380 km) controlled-access toll road that lies entirely within the US state of Kansas. It runs in a general southwest–northeast direction from the Oklahoma border to Kansas City. It passes through several major Kansas cities, including Wichita, Topeka, and Lawrence. The turnpike is owned and maintained by the Kansas Turnpike Authority (KTA), which is headquartered in Wichita.

The Kansas Turnpike was built from 1954 to 1956, predating the Interstate Highway System. While not part of the system's early plans, the turnpike was eventually incorporated into the Interstate System in late 1956 and is designated today as four different Interstate Highway routes: Interstate 35 (I-35), Interstate 335 (I-335), I-470, and I-70. The turnpike also carries a piece of two U.S. Highways: U.S. Highway 24 (US-24) and US-40 in Kansas City.

Because it predates the Interstate Highway System, the road is not engineered to current Interstate Highway standards and notably lacks a regulation-width median. To reduce the risk of head-on collisions, the Kansas Turnpike now has a continuous, permanent Jersey barrier in the median over its entire length. On opening, there was no fixed speed limit on the highway; drivers were merely asked to keep to a "reasonable and proper" limit, although, shortly afterward, signs were erected in certain stretches indicating a maximum speed of 80 mph (130 km/h). From 1970 to 1974 and again since 2011, the turnpike's speed limit has been set at 75 mph (121 km/h); that limit during the earlier period applied only during daytime hours.

Around 120,000 drivers use the turnpike daily. The road features numerous services, including a travel radio station and six service areas. One of these service areas is notable for the presence of a memorial to University of Notre Dame football coach Knute Rockne, who died near the current highway's route.

Since July 1, 2024, the turnpike has utilized open road tolling, with all tolls payable with a K-TAG transponder or via license plate recognition. The turnpike is self-sustaining; it derives its entire revenue from the tolls collected and requires no additional tax money for maintenance or administration.

== History ==
=== Early history ===
Early federal plans for a nationwide system of interregional highways did not include a route along or near the present turnpike, instead connecting Oklahoma City and Kansas City via southeastern Kansas and US-69. By the mid-1940s, this route had shifted to roughly the present I-35 alignment, serving Wichita. The only major difference from the present route was between Wichita and Emporia, where the highway ran north to Newton before turning northeast along US-50.

In the early 1950s, toll roads were gaining in popularity as a mechanism for funding new superhighways. This trend started with the Pennsylvania Turnpike in 1940, which was mimicked by other toll roads in New York, New Jersey, several New England states, West Virginia, Ohio, and Colorado. In October 1951, the Highway Council of the Kansas Chamber of Commerce researched the possibility of integrating the state into a potential cross-country turnpike system. Eastern Kansas was also included in an interstate turnpike system stretching from Galveston, Texas, to Saint Louis, Missouri, via Kansas City, that was proposed by Oklahoma Governor Johnston Murray. Many firms from construction industries, as well as those concerned about the state's economic development, worked to have legislation passed to allow the turnpike to be constructed. Governor Ed Arn and Gale Moss, the State Highway Director, were two major proponents of the turnpike concept.

The turnpike idea was an attractive one because initial construction was to be financed by the private sector via sales of revenue bonds, allowing state highway funds to be used for other important projects. The new toll road would also reduce traffic, and thus maintenance costs, on existing roads. There was also a concern that if Kansas lagged behind in turnpike construction, it might be bypassed by toll roads in other states, leaving it at an economic disadvantage. The toll concept also had the benefit of ultimately putting the financial burden on the drivers who actually used the road, instead of using tax revenue that had been collected from residents statewide. There was some opposition to the plan from both government officials and citizens due to concerns that the toll revenue might not cover the repayments to investors, bankrupting the turnpike authority and burdening the state government with the remaining debt. There were also worries about the possibility of the turnpike requiring maintenance before the bonds had been repaid. Some critics also felt that the high speeds typical of turnpike driving were unsafe. As right-of-way for the project was obtained, the turnpike drew additional opposition from farmers and ranchers, who objected to the turnpike bisecting their property, making it difficult to access disjointed parcels of land.

The Kansas Chamber of Commerce held "turnpike clinics" in several locations across Kansas in 1952, reporting an overwhelmingly positive reception from the public. The Kansas Turnpike Act, defining a turnpike from Oklahoma to Kansas City, became effective April 7, 1953. It created the KTA, with Gale Moss selected as its first chairman. With a budget of only $25,000 (equivalent to $233,408 in 2024), the KTA's first office was a former barbershop in the Kansas State Capitol.

Given Oklahoma's plans to build a turnpike north from Oklahoma City to the Kansas state line, and taking into account traffic flow maps prepared by the highway department, a preliminary route was chosen connecting the proposed Oklahoma turnpike to Kansas City via Wichita and Topeka. A second route extending from Topeka to Salina and further west to the Colorado state line (the modern-day I-70 corridor) was also studied. Over 173,000 drivers were surveyed to determine how many of them would be willing to use the two proposed routes in order to establish their profitability. While the western Kansas route was determined not to be feasible, the Oklahoma–Kansas City route was projected to generate a total revenue of $9 million in 1957 (equivalent to $76.6 million in 2024). After considering a number of different alignments, including one bypassing Topeka via the present route of I-35, the state decided on an "airline" route between Wichita and Topeka. From Wichita south, the turnpike was to parallel US-81, continuing into Oklahoma; the interchange with US-166 at South Haven was included to provide an outlet if Oklahoma lagged in its construction. The turnpike was to parallel US-40 from Topeka to Kansas City. The Kansas City end was set at 18th Street and Muncie Boulevard, which was to be extended and upgraded to a freeway (the Muncie Expressway) to the Intercity Viaduct by the state.

After a ruling from the state supreme court that found that the KTA could issue bonds and oversee the construction and administration of the turnpike, the turnpike authority sold $160 million (equivalent to $1.36 billion in 2024) in revenue bonds in September 1954. KTA bonds were quickly bought by investors, who were attracted by the Kansas Turnpike's low construction costs—only one-third of that of turnpikes in other states—and projections showing that enough tolls would be collected to pay off investors after 19 years.

Ground was broken on December 31, 1954, at the Kansas River bridge near Lawrence. Construction of the entire length of the turnpike was scheduled to take place all at once, with the turnpike partitioned into 14 parts, and the overall length also divided into 43 smaller portions. The KTA sent out letters en masse to the affected landowners, offering a price and referring appeals to the local district court, which typically valued the land at a lesser amount; this methodology was not without criticism. During the construction period, the state highway department suffered a "brain drain" as many staffers resigned to take up KTA jobs, which paid better salaries (Chairman Moss's KTA salary was three times that of his salary as director of highways) and offered more exciting challenges.

In June 1956, the Federal Aid Highway Act of 1956 was signed into law, granting funding to the nationwide Interstate Highway System. Without its Oklahoma link, the Kansas Turnpike was in danger of being bypassed by the Interstate System entirely. At the end of 1956, however, the Bureau of Public Roads and the state of Kansas agreed to route I-35 along the turnpike south of Emporia and I-70 along the piece east of Topeka. The state insisted on a separate Emporia–Kansas City alignment, and the mileage that would have been used to build I-35 from Wichita to Emporia via Newton was instead used for I-35W (now I-135) from Wichita via Newton to Salina.

After almost 22 months of construction, the road was opened for a day of free travel on October 20, 1956, between 6:00 am and 2:00 pm. An estimated 12,000 to 15,000 cars traveled on the turnpike. Many of those motorists traveled to Lawrence for a football game between the University of Kansas and University of Oklahoma. Official opening ceremonies were held at interchanges in each of the three major cities on October 25. The Kansas City celebration included Gene Autry jumping his horse through a large paper map of the turnpike. John Masefield, the British Poet Laureate, wrote a tribute to commemorate the occasion. On the first day after the official opening, 7,197 vehicles traveled the turnpike, with 81 toll collectors and 50 maintenance workers on duty. The turnpike originally had 14 interchanges; by 2012, there were 22.

=== Southern terminus ===
Despite Oklahoma's role in instigating the construction of the Kansas Turnpike, its plans for a connecting turnpike fell through. The Oklahoma Turnpike Authority (OTA) had not performed a traffic study, as the KTA had, to prove that the proposed Oklahoma turnpike would be profitable. Oklahoma also suffered from a poorer credit rating than did Kansas. Additionally, by this time, many states' turnpike authorities were competing in the bond markets for investor dollars. All of these issues combined made it difficult for OTA to issue bonds for its toll road. When funding had been obtained, political issues stalled the proposed toll road further.

With no counterpart to the south, the Kansas Turnpike ended at the state line, at an at-grade intersection with E0010 Road. (Note: The National Bridge Inventory lists the bridge at the state line (CO RD 3604C) as 1958, which matches the other two bridges in Oklahoma north of U.S. Highway 177 (US-77), while the nearby bridges in Kansas are all from 1956. The bridges at and immediately south of US-177 are from 1959.) Just across the state line was an oat field, into which many inattentive motorists crashed. This abrupt end became nationally famous after Wyoming Governor Milward L. Simpson and his wife crashed in mid-1957. The oat farmer plowed the field to provide a safer landing, and the KTA was persuaded to install a huge wooden barrier at the end of the highway. Within a day, three more drivers had crashed and destroyed the barrier, so the KTA closed the turnpike south of the South Haven interchange. The KTA provided the state of Oklahoma with financial aid to construct its portion of a temporary road leading to the interchange. The lack of continuity in the highway was one of the primary reasons that the road generated little revenue in its first years; another reason was a lack of education on the part of motorists as to the concept of a toll road.

Although Oklahoma's plans to construct a toll road from the southern end of the Kansas Turnpike at the state line to Oklahoma City did not materialize, a year and a half after the opening of the turnpike, a five-mile (8.0 km) connection to US 177 at Braman was put into service on April 22, 1958. (Note: The 1958 Oklahoma State Highway Map, the first to show the turnpike, shows the freeway ending at US-177. The 1959 map is the first to place an I-35 shield on the road.) Eventually, I-35 was completed south to Oklahoma City.

=== Later history ===
While the initial turnpike was still being built, the KTA authorized four feasibility studies in October 1954. Three of them—a spur to Leavenworth and Saint Joseph, Missouri; a spur from Wichita to Hutchinson, Great Bend, and Hays; and a new Intercity Viaduct to Kansas City, Missouri—did not go anywhere. But the fourth proposal, a toll bridge on 18th Street in Kansas City, was pushed through, and the KTA agreed to build the turnpike in early 1956. The 18th Street Expressway, running south from the turnpike's east end over the Kansas River, opened in 1959, improving access to northeast Johnson County.

As the turnpike did not use any state tax revenue for maintenance, the pavement began to deteriorate rapidly, and crews faced difficulty keeping up with the snow in winter conditions in a winter storm during 1960. In the early 1960s, many senior positions in the KTA were cut, and, thanks to this and other austerity measures, such as targeting maintenance to save costs in the future, the turnpike slowly became profitable. By 1966, it was clear that the turnpike had not been built to the higher standards of the Interstate Highway System; the roadway had developed ruts and other issues due to deferred maintenance. To temporarily fix the problem, a layer of asphalt oil and a layer of sand and asphalt was used to fill in the ruts, and graded rock coated with asphalt was used to seal the road. Since the road had been originally constructed at the same time, and not built in segments over a period of time, similar maintenance issues appeared along the whole length of the road at the same time. Bridges and pavement were repaired on a rotating basis, to stagger the cost of needed repairs. The bridge over the Kansas River was widened and replaced after 1973. As economic conditions improved for the Authority, equipment was slowly replaced, and workers were given pay increases, both of which were badly needed.

The East Topeka interchange was completely rebuilt in the late 1990s, with a goal of rerouting I-70 and improving access to the turnpike. The design was completed in 1997, and the project was finished in 2001 at a cost of $98.6 million in 1999 (equivalent to $174 million in 2024).

On the evening of April 6, 2002, a grease fire broke out in the Hardee's restaurant at the Belle Plaine service plaza. Exacerbated by heavy winds, the fire destroyed the building, which also contained a travel information center. Four fire departments responded to the scene. The assistant fire chief and fire chief of the Wellington Fire Department gave conflicting statements on whether the unavailability of the Wellington water tower, which had been emptied while it was being repainted, had hampered efforts to extinguish the blaze. The fire burned for three hours, with hot spots still smoldering the following day. No injuries were reported. The fire caused $2 million (equivalent to $3.32 million in 2024) in damages. The service plaza was rebuilt, with a reopening celebration occurring on July 24, 2003.

A 390-year flood event took place on the night of August 30, 2003, at the Kansas Turnpike's crossing of Jacobs Creek, a tributary of the Cottonwood River 11 miles (18 km) southwest of Emporia (turnpike milepost 116). A thunderstorm that evening dropped large amounts of rain in the area, with a gauge at Plymouth reporting 7.1 inches (18 cm) of rainfall in a 24-hour period. The culvert carrying Jacobs Creek under the turnpike quickly exceeded its capacity, and water rose onto the turnpike. A pool of water four feet (1.2 m) deep formed on the northbound lanes; the concrete median barrier initially prevented most of the water from crossing to the southbound lanes. Seven cars, all headed northbound, stalled in the floodwater. The median barrier then gave way, sweeping the stalled cars across the southbound lanes and down the creek as far as 1.5 miles (2.4 km) from the highway. Six people died in the flood.

Another flooding event, this one a 100-year flood, caused a portion of the Kansas Turnpike to close in 2019. In the early morning hours of May 8, rain gauges in Rose Hill registered over 10 inches (25 cm) of rainfall in a 24-hour period. Flash flooding along Slate Creek caused that tributary of the Arkansas River to inundate the turnpike four miles (6.4 km) south of the Wellington exit. As a result, just after midnight, the KTA made the decision to close the turnpike between Wellington and the Oklahoma state line. The turnpike reopened on May 10.

In the 2020s, the entire Kansas Turnpike was designated as an Alternative Fuel Corridor for electric vehicles.

== Tolls ==
The Kansas Turnpike uses all-electronic tolling since July 1, 2024. Cash is no longer accepted. Tolls are instead paid using K-TAG (or compatible transponder) or via license plate recognition, which sends a bill to the vehicle's registered owner. As of 2024, motorists driving two-axle vehicles (such as cars and motorcycles) pay 4.8¢ per mile driven if using a K-TAG, for a total of $11.36 to drive the entire length of the turnpike from the Oklahoma state line to Kansas City. Motorists using license plate recognition to pay their toll pay double the K-TAG rate, currently 9.6¢ per mile for a two-axle vehicle (or $22.72 for the entire length). Vehicles with more than two axles, such as semi-trucks, pay higher tolls; five-axle vehicles are charged 13.8¢ per mile with K-TAG or 27.6¢ per mile with license plate tolling and nine-axle vehicles pay 33.4¢ per mile with K-TAG or 66.8¢ per mile with license plate tolling.

Flat-rate tolls are collected at 21 open road tolling gantries located on the turnpike. Each gantry is assigned to a segment of turnpike, usually between two adjacent interchanges. Motorists passing each gantry pay the per-mile fare for the distance of that segment. The total fare for any given trip may be calculated by adding the tolls charged at each gantry along one's route.

The Kansas Turnpike is completely self-sustaining and operated on a cash surplus of nearly $600 million (equivalent to $753 million in 2024) at end of fiscal year 2017. All costs are paid for by the tolls collected; no tax money is used for construction, maintenance, or administration. The KTA estimates that 120,000 drivers use the turnpike each day.

=== K-TAG ===
K-TAG is the electronic toll collection system operated by the Kansas Turnpike. The system makes use of transponder stickers, which are affixed to the vehicle's windshield. Each account may receive up to two free K-TAG stickers. External bumper mounted transponders are alternatively available for purchase, intended for motorcycles and vehicles with specialty windshields that preclude proper functioning of the sticker tag. Accounts are free to open and require no monthly service fees, but do require a credit card or bank account on file, from which accrued tolls are automatically billed each month. K-TAG was introduced in 1995; the system was internally designed and is internally run instead of being contracted to another company, saving additional overhead costs.

As of 2024, K-TAG is compatible with NationalPass, used in several other states; PikePass, in neighboring Oklahoma; ExpressToll, in neighboring Colorado; and TxTag, EZ TAG, and TollTag in Texas. It is compatible with the SunPass system in Florida as of February 2023, but not currently on roads maintained by the Central Florida Expressway Authority. K-TAG is also compatible with the BestPass and PrePass commercial toll transponders, but it is not compatible with any additional systems, including the E-ZPass system in the eastern United States.

=== Tolling History ===
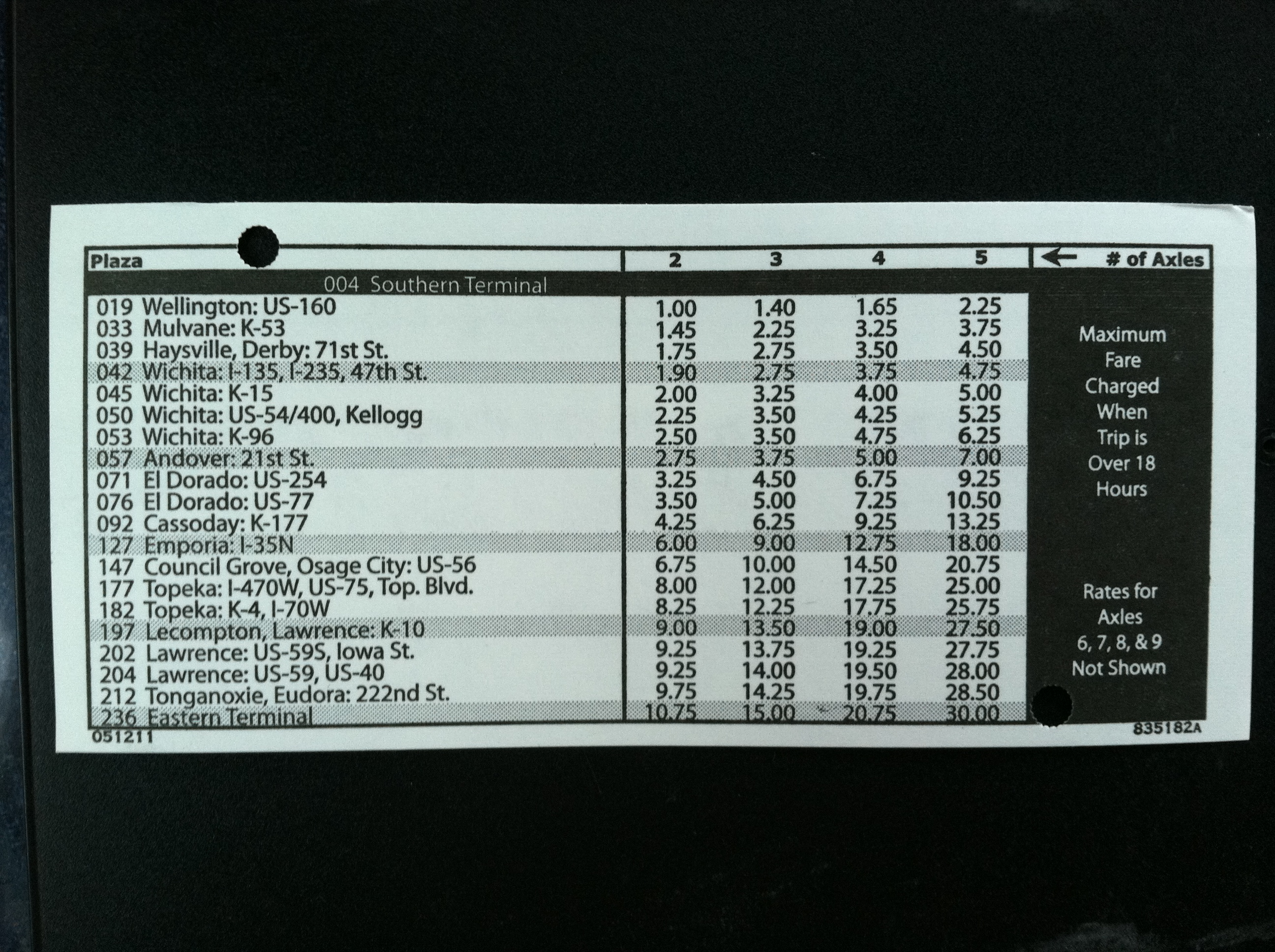
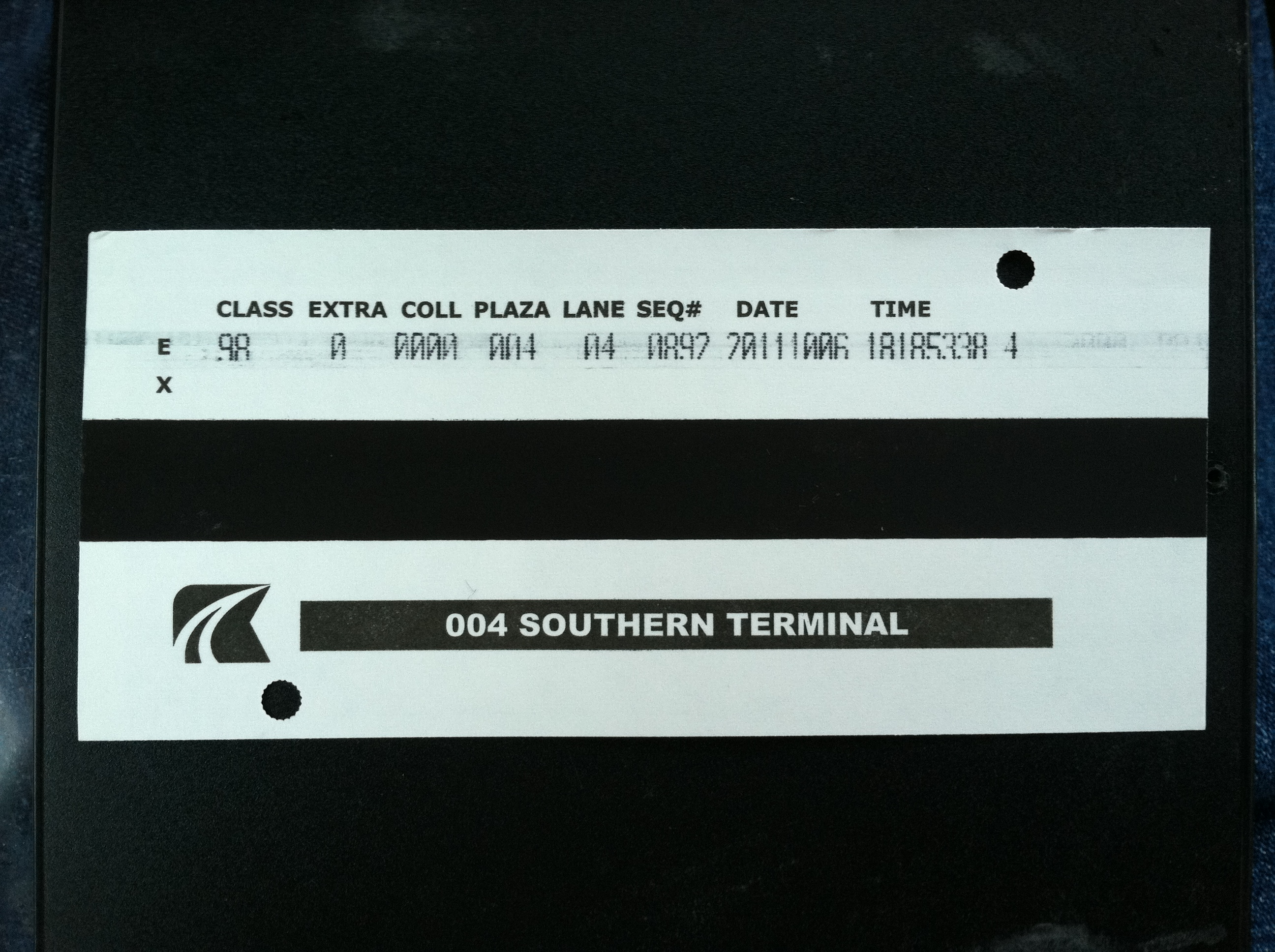
The front and back of a ticket from the Kansas Turnpike, issued at the Southern Terminal on October 6, 2011.

Prior to 2024, the turnpike used a ticket-based collection system. When entering the turnpike, either at one of the termini or at an interchange, a driver was issued a ticket that indicated the toll plaza at which they entered. When leaving the turnpike, this ticket was used to determine the amount of the toll. If a motorist presented a ticket at the same toll plaza it was issued from, the KTA charged a "per-minute" fare if the trip was more than 15 minutes. If the ticket was lost, or if the trip took over 18 hours to complete, the driver was charged the highest possible toll for that exit.

Exit 53A in Wichita, which opened in 2021, was the first cashless interchange on the turnpike system. The turnpike had a toll gantry on the exit ramp in lieu of a traditional toll plaza. Until the remainder of the turnpike went cashless in 2024, this interchange operated as a special cashless interchange within an otherwise cash-based ticketed system. Drivers without a K-TAG were asked to pay their toll online at the standard cash rates. If the toll was not paid after 10 days, a bill was mailed to the vehicle's registered owner at a slightly higher "video rate". If the mailed bill fell delinquent, the highest "violation rate" was charged along with late fees.

In July 2023, the KTA announced that all existing toll booths would be replaced with cashless tolling gantries by the following year. At these toll gantries, a vehicle without K-TAG would have a picture taken of its license plate, and a bill for the toll would be mailed to its owner. In early 2024, the date for the conversion to cashless tolling was officially set to July 1, 2024.

== Route description ==
Map of the Kansas Turnpike

The Kansas Turnpike is 236 miles (380 km) long. As of 2014, the Kansas Turnpike has 22 interchanges and two barrier toll plazas. Many of the interchanges are designed as trumpet interchanges with a connector road to the crossroad, for easy placement of a single toll plaza on the connector.

Exit numbers were originally sequential but are assigned today by mileage from south to east, the same numbering system used by the majority of US states for their Interstate Highways as well. After passing the Bonner Springs interchange, exit numbers change to match the mileage of I-70 east from the Colorado border, which is also used on I-70 west of the turnpike. This results in discontinuous exit numbers on I-70.

=== Oklahoma state line to Emporia ===
The first 127 miles (204 km) of the highway, between its southern terminus at the Oklahoma border and Emporia, Kansas, are designated as I-35. The Kansas Turnpike is the only tolled section on this Interstate. The turnpike runs due north and south between its southern terminus and Wichita. This stretch of the highway runs parallel to US-81, which lies to the west of the turnpike.

The Kansas Turnpike begins at the Oklahoma state line north of Braman, Oklahoma. This is also the point at which I-35 crosses from Kay County to Sumner County. The turnpike proceeds due north from the state line, with no interchanges for its first four miles (6.4 km) in Kansas. The southernmost interchange on the turnpike is exit 4 (South Haven), which serves US-166. US-166 heads east to Arkansas City and west to US-81 at South Haven. This interchange is a four-ramp folded diamond with ramps in the southeast and northwest quadrants. It has no toll plazas, as it lies south of the southern barrier toll. Northbound traffic must exit at US-166 to avoid paying a toll. Initially, the interchange provided only a southbound exit and northbound entrance, forcing drivers who did not wish to pay a toll to leave I-35 in Oklahoma. By 1976, the other two ramps had been added.

From exit 4, the turnpike continues on a due north course, crossing Slate Creek, before coming to the Southern Terminal barrier toll plaza, where tickets are issued for all northbound traffic, and fares are collected from southbound traffic. The next interchange north of the toll plaza is exit 19 (Wellington), serving US-160, which heads west to Wellington, the county seat of Sumner County, and east to Winfield, the seat of adjoining Cowley County. It is the first of many trumpet interchanges serving the surface road via a connector road with a toll plaza. When the turnpike first opened, the US-160 interchange was a reverse diamond with four loop ramps, so that all traffic using the interchange had to pass under the bridge and thus through the toll plaza. The new configuration was built c. 1988.

The freeway takes a brief jog to the northeast before crossing over a Burlington Northern Santa Fe rail line southeast of Riverdale. In the median at mile 26 is the Belle Plaine Service Area. North of the service plaza, the highway bridges the Ninnescah River and then K-55/East 90th Avenue North. No interchange is present to allow turnpike travelers to connect to the K-55.

The turnpike's next interchange is exit 33 (Mulvane), which connects to K-53/East 119th Street South via a trumpet ramp, just east of the west end of K-53 at US-81. The interchange was built c. 1985. It was reconstructed in 2011 to serve the Kansas Star Casino with roundabouts on each side of the flyover. The east roundabout directs traffic to K-53. The west roundabout directs traffic to the casino. There is now a toll booth on the casino side of the intersection as well as the one on the entrance to K-53. This interchange straddles the Sumner–Sedgwick county line.

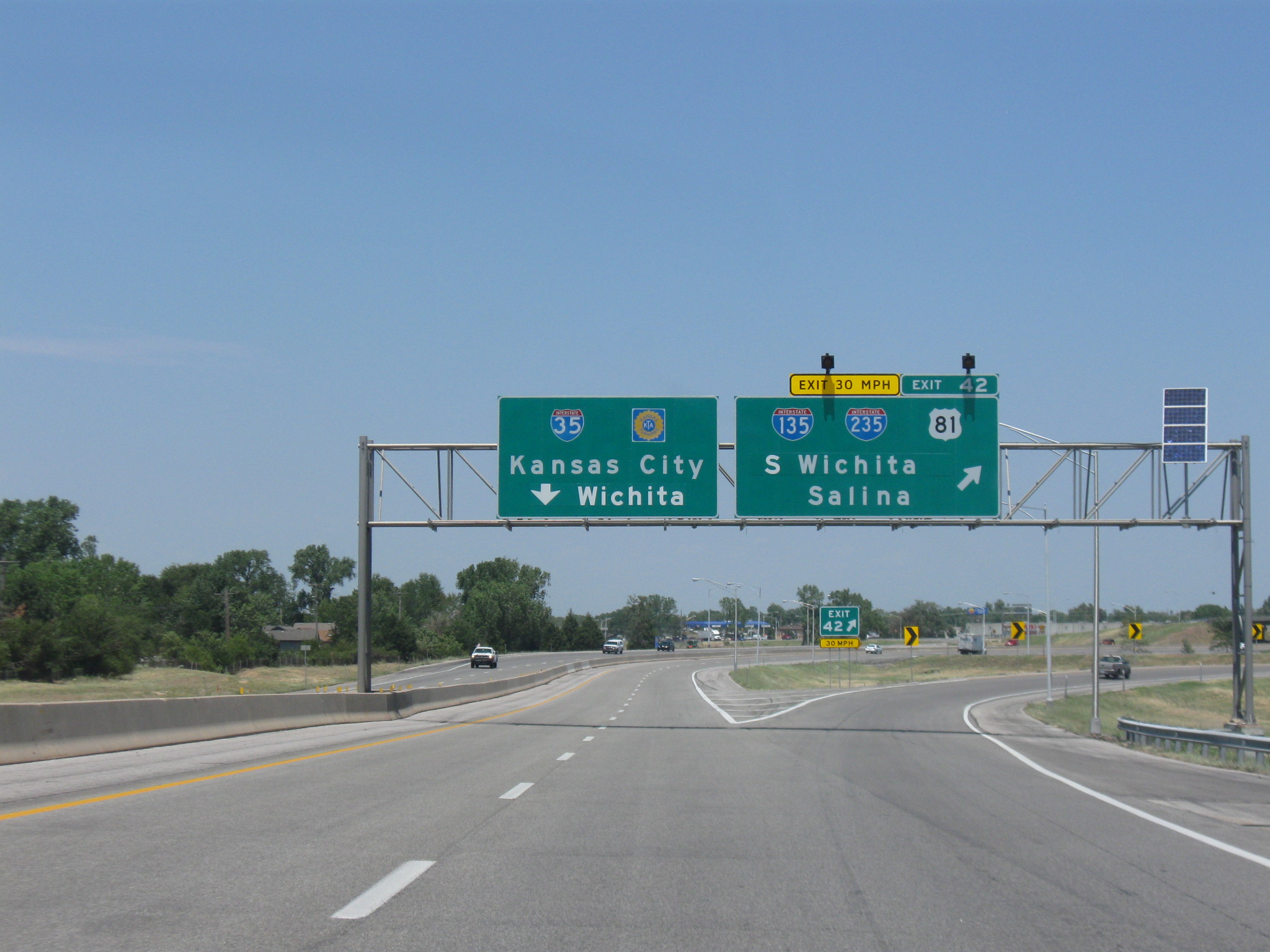
Northbound at exit 42 where I-135 begins while the turnpike turns more northeast

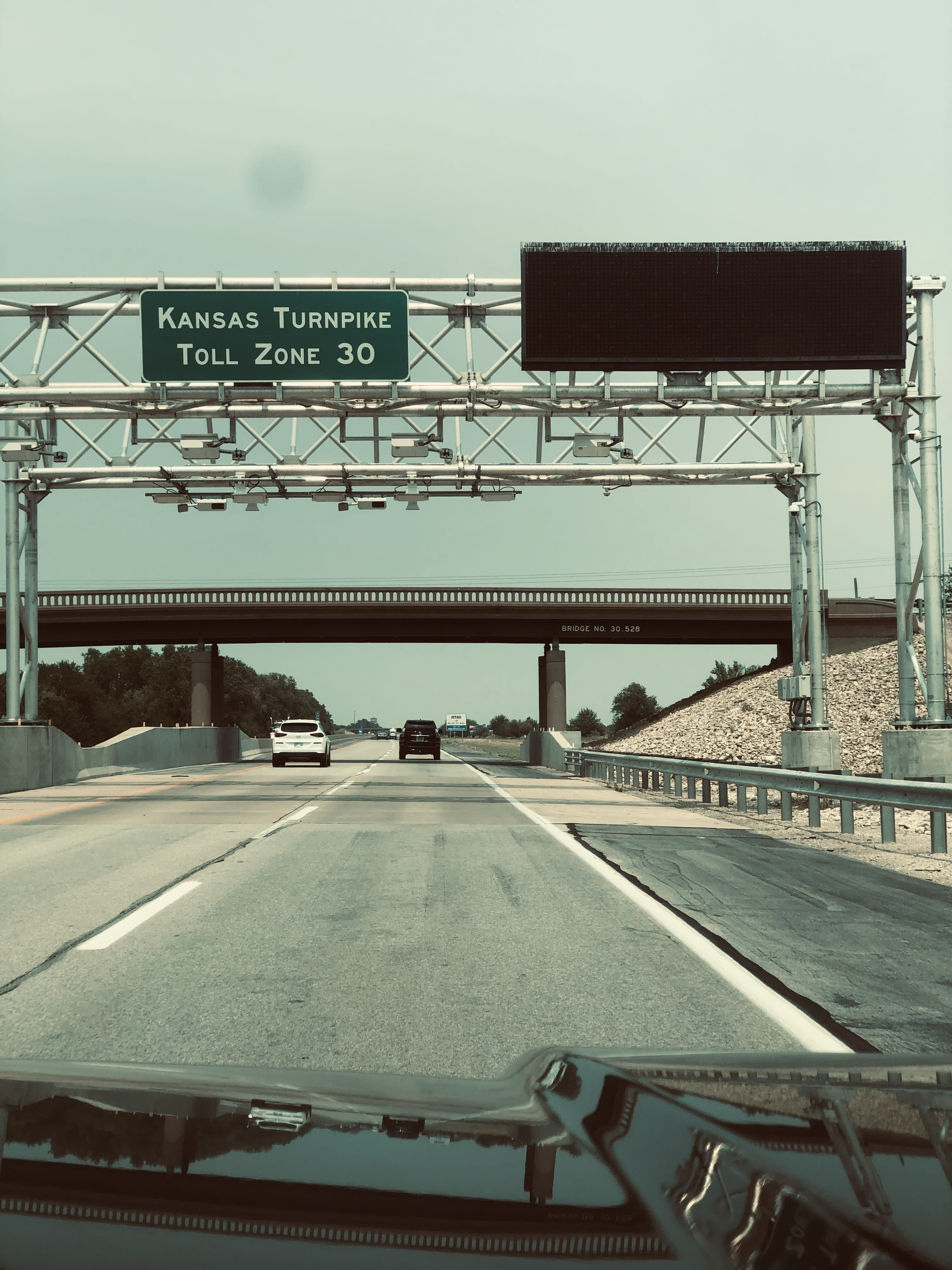
Kansas Turnpike Toll Zone 30, located at Mile Marker 30 on I-35 at the Sumner and Sedgwick county borders

In southern Sedgwick County, the Kansas Turnpike enters the Wichita metropolitan area. Exit 39 (Haysville) serves two of Wichita's southern suburbs. This exit is a diamond interchange with a connector road (South Mead Drive) to East 71st Street South, which runs west to US-81 and Haysville and east to Derby. It was built c. 1989. Now in Wichita proper, the highway reaches exit 42 (South Wichita), which is the south end of I-135. I-135 heads north through Wichita, the largest city in Kansas, toward Salina; US-81 joins at the first interchange and I-235 begins at the second. The interchange is a simple trumpet with I-135, and opened in 1956 with the turnpike, but the connector ended at 47th Street (now US-81) until c. 1961.

After passing exit 42, the turnpike curves away from US-81, turning northeast toward El Dorado and Emporia. It crosses the Arkansas River between exits 42 and 45. Exit 45 (Wichita) is a trumpet connection to K-15/Southeast Boulevard and Turnpike Drive in southern Wichita. It opened in 1956 as one of the original interchanges. As the highway continues northeast through Wichita, it comes to exit 50 (East Wichita), a double-trumpet connection to the parallel Kellogg Avenue, which carries US-54 and US-400. It is one of the original 1956 interchanges. Exit 53, the final Wichita exit, is a trumpet connection to the K-96 freeway. The connector road junctions K-96 at a four-ramp partial cloverleaf interchange and ends at North 127th Street East. The interchange opened c. 1994 along with the nearby piece of K-96.

East of exit 53, the turnpike passes into Butler County. Exit 57 (Andover) connects to East 21st Street northeast of downtown Andover, an eastern suburb of Wichita. The turnpike uses a diamond interchange with the connector road (Southwest Cross Road) to East 21st Street. This interchange opened c. 1985. The turnpike then crosses the Whitewater River southwest of the Towanda Service Area in the median at mile 65. From the service area, the highway proceeds northeast to exit 71 (El Dorado), a trumpet connection to K-254 just east of its junction with K-196. The connector originally directly intersected K-254, but it now ends between K-254/West Central Avenue and West 6th Avenue at Boyer Road just north of K-254. Exit 71 opened with the original turnpike in 1956. North of El Dorado, exit 76 (El Dorado) connects the Kansas Turnpike to US-77/North Main Street via a trumpet ramp. It opened c. 1986.

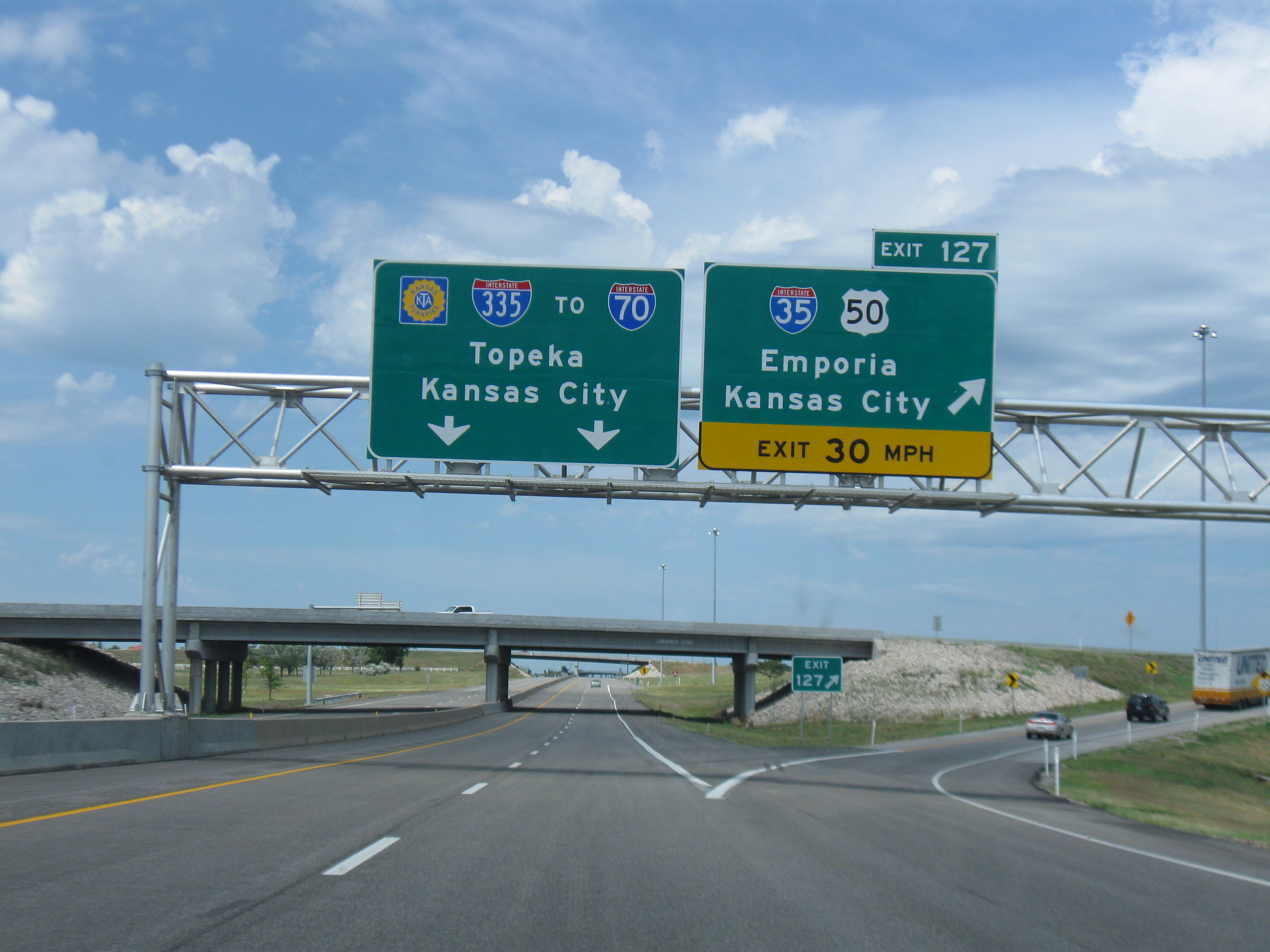
Exit 127, the Emporia interchange, marking the beginning of the I-335 designation and the departure of I-35 from the Turnpike

After passing through El Dorado, the Kansas Turnpike crosses the northernmost arms of El Dorado Lake. This marks the turnpike's entry into the Flint Hills, a band of hills in eastern Kansas. The turnpike does not leave this region completely until it reaches Topeka. As the highway continues northeast past El Dorado Lake, it runs roughly parallel to the Walnut River to the west, which feeds the reservoir, and K-177 to the east. Northwest of the town of Cassoday, K-177 finally crosses the turnpike, with exit 92 (Cassoday), a diamond interchange, providing a connector to the state highway. The interchange was not present when the turnpike opened in 1956 but was built soon after as an east-facing folded diamond with two separate toll plazas. The present configuration was built c. 1995. Near this interchange, the turnpike crosses the Walnut River.

Northeast of the Cassoday interchange, the Kansas Turnpike enters Chase County. In the median at mile 97, just north of the county line, is the Matfield Green Service Area. Approximately 13.7 miles (22.0 km) northeast of the service area, an interchange provides access to a set of cattle pens southeast of Bazaar. Other than these two service exits, there are no interchanges within Chase County; upon leaving it, the turnpike passes into Lyon County.

The next interchange along the turnpike is exit 127 (Emporia). At this trumpet interchange, I-35 leaves the turnpike to head east through Emporia, the county seat of Lyon County, on its way northeast to Kansas City via Ottawa. The interchange, as opened in 1956 with the original turnpike, connected directly to US-50 at Overlander Street; a different configuration opened c. 1966 along with the connecting piece of I-35. In 2005, the KTA approved reconstruction of the Emporia interchange to improve connections to US-50, I-35, and the city of Emporia, resulting in the present configuration. This project, funded by the KTA, the Kansas Department of Transportation (KDOT), and the city of Emporia, was completed in 2008.

=== Emporia to Topeka ===
Interstate 335
- Location: Emporia–Topeka
- Length: 50.28 mi (80.92 km)
- Existed: 1987–present

After the split with I-35, the Kansas Turnpike continues northeast as I-335. Nevertheless, its exits are numbered as if I-35 had continued along it. This highway exists entirely as a part of the Kansas Turnpike. In fact, until 1987, this stretch of the turnpike was designated solely as the Kansas Turnpike without an Interstate number. It was only after a change in the National Maximum Speed Law, when state legislators were given the authority to raise the speed limits on rural Interstate Highways to 65 mph (105 km/h), that this segment of the Kansas Turnpike was given the I-335 designation so that it could fall under the new law.

Northeast of Emporia, the Emporia Service Area is in the median at mile 132. The turnpike continues northeast through the northern reaches of the Flint Hills, coming to an interchange with US 56 near Admire. This interchange, exit 147, is the only interchange along the I-335 section of the turnpike other than the two end junctions. It is a trumpet connection to US 56, which heads west to Council Grove and east to Osage City, and was one of the original 1956 interchanges.

From the Admire exit, the Kansas Turnpike continues northeast, passing through the southeast corner of Wabaunsee County and the northwestern part of Osage County. The turnpike enters Shawnee County and continues through rural land before it heads into the Topeka area. Here, the roadway has an interchange that serves I-470 and US 75 at exit 177. At this point, I-335 ends and I-470 joins the turnpike as it passes through suburban development in the southeastern part of Topeka. In the eastern portion of the city, the highway reaches an interchange with I-70, US 40, and K-4 at exits 182 and 183.

=== Topeka to Kansas City ===
The remainder of the turnpike runs on I-70 from Topeka to the turnpike's eastern terminus in Kansas City. This is one of only two tolled sections of I-70. (Note: The other is on the Pennsylvania Turnpike, where I-70 is concurrent with I-76.) The turnpike continues east along I-70 and crosses Tecumseh Creek. The Topeka Service Area is located on the north side of the road east of here at mile 188. It is accessed by ramps on the right side of the highway in both directions. Just east of the service area, the turnpike enters Douglas County while passing over US 40 without an interchange. The route then curves to the southeast and runs roughly parallel to US 40. A series of curves takes the turnpike farther east as it reaches exit 197 (Lecompton), a folded diamond interchange with the western terminus of K-10. After this, the highway continues farther east and enters the city of Lawrence, where it shares a diamond interchange with McDonald Drive at exit 202 (West Lawrence). McDonald Drive leads to US 59 south of the turnpike. East of here, the highway bends east-northeasterly, crosses the Kansas River, and then intersects US 40 and US 59, which run concurrently, at exit 204 (East Lawrence).

The Kansas Turnpike then leaves Lawrence and bends to the northeast before leaving Douglas County and entering Leavenworth. It overpasses Mud Creek before passing under K-32. Northeast of here at mile 209, the Lawrence Service Area is in the median. Afterward, the turnpike has a diamond interchange with 222nd Street, which is signed as Leavenworth County Road 1, at exit 212 (Tonganoxie/Eudora). The highway then travels northeast and passes through it eastern terminal toll booth. This is the final toll booth on the route traveling east, and all vehicles must pay their final toll before continuing. The turnpike then enters Bonner Springs. It crosses Wolf Creek before leaving Leavenworth County and entering Wyandotte County. In Bonner Springs, the turnpike intersects K-7, westbound US 24, westbound US 40, and the southern terminus of US 73 at exit 224 (Bonner Springs, formerly exit 223) with a trumpet interchange. This is the first free exit eastbound. The mileposts on the route switch to match those of I-70 after this interchange.

US 24 and US 40 run concurrently with I-70 and the Kansas Turnpike as it heads east toward Kansas City. Exit 410 on the turnpike is a diamond interchange with North 110th Street. This interchange is located just south of the Kansas Speedway. Just east of here, the route intersects I-435 at exit 411. This exit uses a cloverleaf interchange with one directional ramp and collector–distributor roads to avoid issues with traffic exiting immediately north of the turnpike. After this interchange, the highway enters Kansas City.

The turnpike's first exit in the city is exit 414, a diamond interchange with North 78th Street. Next, the highway curves slightly to the northeast and intersects the Turner Diagonal at exit 415, an interchange consisting of a half-cloverleaf interchange for the western ramps and a Y-interchange for the eastern ramps that intersects the Turner Diagonal at a trumpet interchange north of the turnpike. East of here, the route has a diamond interchange with North 57th Street at exit 417. Directly east of North 57th Street, the turnpike crosses Brenner Heights Creek. After this, the turnpike continues due east to a fully directional interchange with I-635 at exit 418.

After this interchange, the freeway bends in a southeastern direction and reaches its final exit, exit 420. This exit is a cloverleaf interchange with US 69, which is also known as the 18th Street Expressway. At this interchange, US 69 turns east to overlap I-70, US 40, and US 24, and the highways continue east of exit 420 toward Kansas City, Missouri.

== Design ==
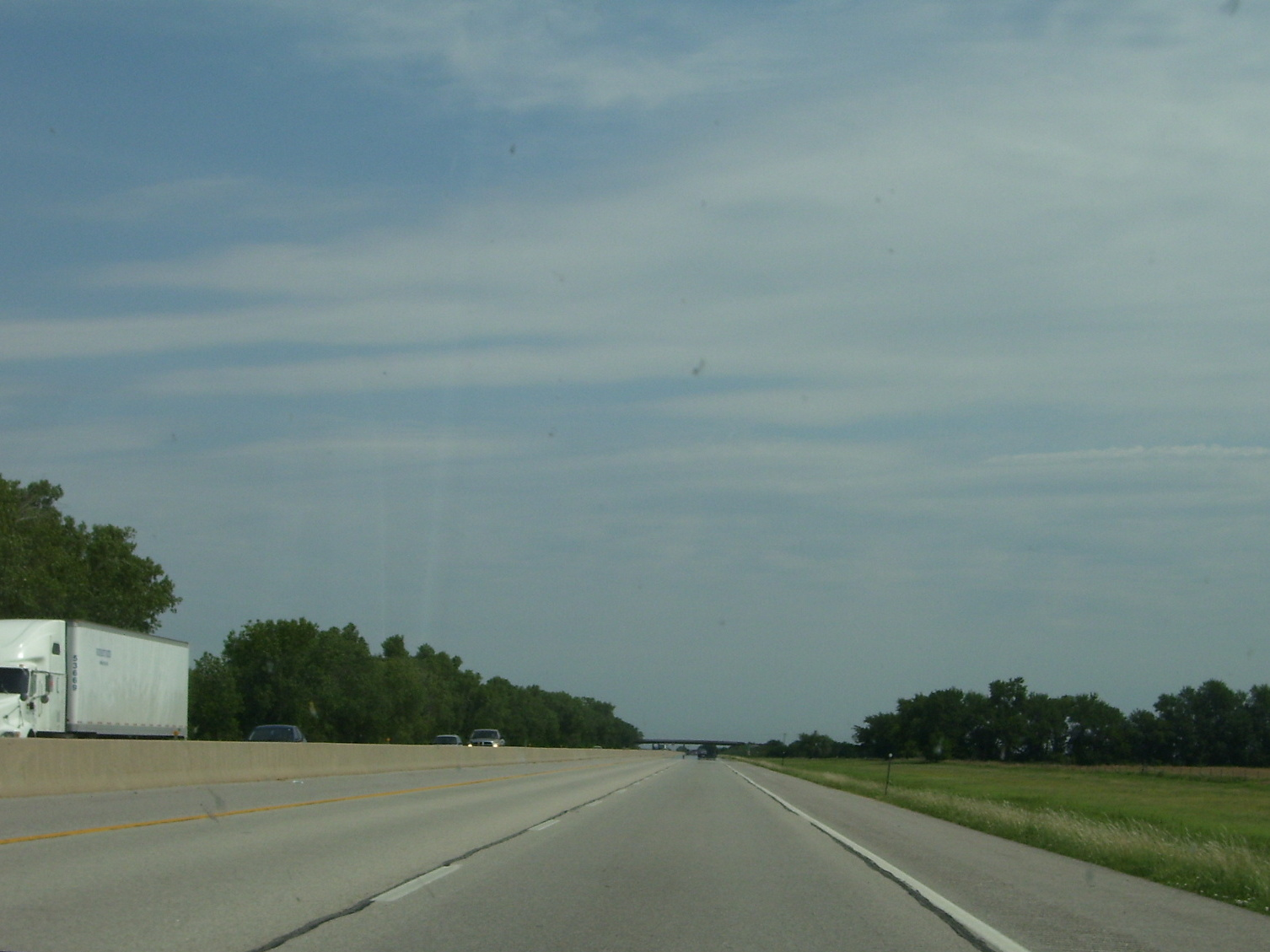
A view from the I-35 portion of the turnpike, between mileposts 29 and 30

Because the Kansas Turnpike was built before the Interstate Highway System, it is not engineered to current Interstate Highway standards; as with all other toll roads that predated the Interstate Highway System, however, the highway was grandfathered to Interstate standards. The turnpike was originally constructed with lanes only 12 feet (3.7 m) wide. Notably, the turnpike was built without a 36-foot (11 m) median. When it opened, the central reservation was a 20-foot (6.1 m) depressed median. Starting in 1985, Jersey barriers were installed along its entire length.

Kansas Turnpike mileposts are continuous along the entire length of the turnpike. Originally, milepost numbering began with 0 at the junction of the 18th Street Expressway and counted up as one traveled west then south, with milepost 236 appearing at the southern terminus. Then, in 1973, the KTA completely reversed the numbering, and now milemarkers begin at the point where I-35 enters Kansas at the southern border. These numbers are continued along the other three Interstates that make up the turnpike, rather than numbering each Interstate individually, leading to discontinuous numbering on I-70—the exit numbers on tolled I-70 are much lower than those on free I-70.

The majority of the Kansas Turnpike, from the Oklahoma state line to Topeka, was constructed with four-inch-thick (10 cm) asphalt. The 55 miles (89 km) from Topeka to Kansas City was built with Portland cement concrete. Curves along the turnpike are limited to 3° and grades limited to 3%. Early reports said that curves were designed to accommodate speeds of 70 to 75 mph (113 to 121 km/h). When built, the turnpike was designed to allow 18,000-pound (8,200 kg) axle loads. Minimum sight distances were kept at 725 feet (221 m). The 300-foot (91 m) right-of-way featured fenced edges to prevent cattle from entering the roadway and to discourage toll evasion.

=== Speed limits ===
When the turnpike was originally opened, it had no posted speed limit. Nonetheless, "drivers [would] be 'hailed down' if they exceed[ed] 80 miles per hour [130 km/h]". In 1970, the speed limit was reduced to 75 mph (121 km/h) during the day and 70 mph (110 km/h) at night; authorities cited accidents caused by excess speed. Nationwide, the speed limit was reduced to 55 mph (89 km/h) on January 2, 1974; Kansas delayed implementing the reduction until the deadline on March 2, 1974.

When Congress allowed states to increase their speed limits to 65 mph (105 km/h), Kansas increased the speed limit on most of the turnpike; the Emporia–Topeka segment did not have an Interstate designation to allow for an increase there. Other sections through urban areas remained at the lower limits as well. KDOT requested an Interstate designation for the Emporia–Topeka segment of the turnpike by May 1987, which they received on October 23, 1987, when that section was given the I-335 designation to allow for a 65 mph (105 km/h) speed limit. Later, in November 1995, Congress repealed the National Maximum Speed Limit; Kansas initially left its limits alone after the repeal. Legislation that raised the speed limits to 70 mph (110 km/h) took effect on March 22, 1996.

On July 1, 2011, the speed limit on most of the Kansas Turnpike was raised once again to 75 mph (121 km/h) as part of a set of speed limit increases affecting several rural Interstates and U.S. Highways throughout Kansas. The minimum speed is 40 mph (64 km/h).

== Services ==
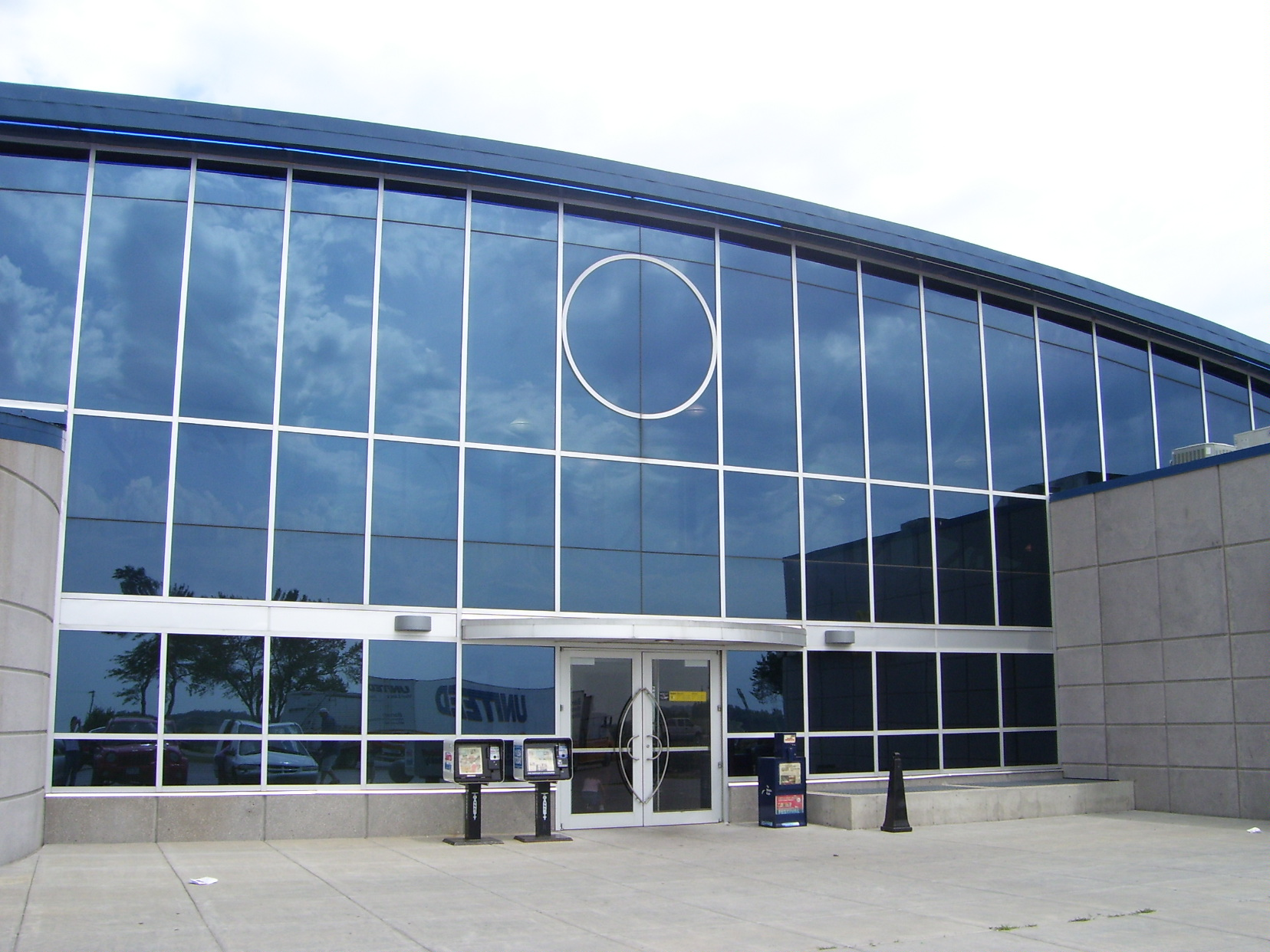
The Towanda Service Area

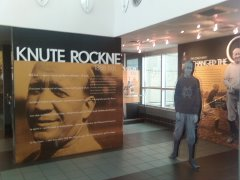
Knute Rockne memorial at Matfield Green rest stop (2009)

The KTA provides a number of services to help motorists and provide incentives for using the turnpike. KTA broadcasts a travel radio station at 1610 AM from Wellington, Wichita, El Dorado, Cassoday, Emporia, Admire, East Topeka, and West Lawrence. Law enforcement is provided by a separate Turnpike Division of the Kansas Highway Patrol. Motorists needing assistance can use a roadside assistance hotline by dialing *KTA (*582) on a mobile phone. Statewide weather and traffic conditions can be accessed by dialing 511. The KTA also provides weather and traffic information on their website. The original service areas were spaced 45 miles (72 km) apart.

There are six service areas located along the highway:

- The Belle Plaine Service Area (mile 26) opened on July 24, 2003, replacing a previous structure at the site that had been destroyed by a grease fire. It contains a 24-hour gas station and convenience store (Love's), a fast food restaurant (McDonald's), a weather kiosk, a Kansas Travel Information Center, and a gift shop.
- The Towanda Service Area (mile 65, six miles south of El Dorado) provides a 24-hour gas station and convenience store and a weather kiosk.
- The Matfield Green Service Area (mile 97) shares the design of the Towanda service area, and also provides a 24-hour gas station and convenience store, and a weather kiosk. The service area at Matfield Green also contains a 175-square-foot (16.3 m^{2}) memorial to Notre Dame football coach Knute Rockne, who died in a 1931 plane crash near Bazaar, a few miles north of the service area.
- The Emporia Service Area (mile 132), like the two service areas to the south, includes a 24-hour gas station and convenience store and two fast food restaurants. Additionally, the facility provides an outdoor exercise area and playground for children.
- The Topeka Service Area (mile 188) opened in May 2002. This service plaza features a gift shop and a 24-hour gas station and Love's convenience store. Previously, five restaurants (including Hardee's, Taco Bell, Pizza Hut and Dunkin Donuts) operated in the plaza, but all closed on April 14, 2023. A McDonald's opened in that space in September 2023. Godfather's Pizza has also opened an outlet, with individual-sized pizzas and breadsticks available. Prior to this plaza's opening, a service area was in the median between exits 182 and 183. It closed in May 2002 when the present Topeka Service Area opened.
- The Lawrence Service Area (mile 209) consists of a 24-hour gas station and Love's convenience store, in addition to a 24-hour McDonald's.

== Exit list ==
County	Location	mi	km	Exit	Destinations	Notes
Sumner	Guelph Township	0.00	0.00		I-35 south – Oklahoma City	Continuation into Oklahoma; southern end of I-35 concurrency
Sumner	Guelph Township	4.07	6.55	4	US-166 to US-81 – Arkansas City, South Haven	
Sumner	Avon Township	19.21	30.92	19	US-160 – Winfield, Wellington	
Sumner	Harmon Township	26	42	Belle Plaine service area		
Sumner–Sedgwick county line	Belle Plaine–Salem township line	33.41	53.77	33	K-53 to US-81 – Mulvane	
Sedgwick	Salem Township	38.31	61.65	39	To US-81 – Haysville, Derby	
Sedgwick	Wichita	43.38	69.81	42	I-135 to I-235 / US-81 – South Wichita, Salina	
Sedgwick	Wichita	45.86	73.80	45	K-15 – Wichita	
Sedgwick	Wichita	49.66	79.92	50	Webb Road	Access via Kellogg Avenue frontage roads
Sedgwick	Wichita	51.4	82.7		127th Street East	Southbound entrance only
Sedgwick	Wichita	52– 52.67	84– 84.76	53	US-54 / US-400 / K-96	Signed as exits 53A (west) and 53B (east) southbound; cashless toll gantry at exit 53A
Butler	Bruno Township			57	Andover	
Butler	Towanda Township	65	105	Towanda service area		
Butler	El Dorado	71.71	115.41	71	K-254 to K-196 – El Dorado	
Butler	El Dorado	76.72	123.47	76	US-77 – El Dorado	
Butler	Cassoday	93.45	150.39	92	K-177 – Cassoday	
Chase	Matfield Township	97	156	Matfield Green service area		
Lyon	Emporia	127.89	205.82	127	I-35 north / US-50 – Emporia, Wichita, Kansas City I-335 begins	Northern end of I-35 concurrency; southern terminus of I-335
Lyon	Fremont Township	132	212	Emporia service area		
Lyon	Waterloo Township	148.00	238.18	147	US-56 – Council Grove, Osage City	
Wabaunsee	No major junctions					
Osage	No major junctions					
Shawnee	Topeka	178.09	286.61	177	I-470 west to US-75 – Topeka, Salina I-335 ends	Western end of I-470 concurrency; northern terminus of I-335
Shawnee	Topeka	182.95	294.43	182 (EB); 183 (WB)	I-70 west / US-40 / K-4 – Topeka, Valley Falls, Salina I-470 ends	Western end of I-70 concurrency; eastern terminus of I-470
Shawnee	Tecumseh Township	188	303	Topeka service area		
Douglas	Kanwaka Township	198.51	319.47	197	K-10 east – Lawrence; CR 438 – Lecompton	To be rebuilt into a system-to-system interchange
Douglas	Lawrence	203.14	326.92	202	To US-59 south – West Lawrence	
Douglas	Lawrence	204.47	329.06	204	US-40 / US-59 to US-24 – East Lawrence	
Leavenworth	Reno Township	209	336	Lawrence service area		
Leavenworth	Reno Township			212	Tonganoxie, Eudora	
Wyandotte	Bonner Springs	225.11	362.28	224	US-73 north / US-24 west / US-40 west / K-7 – Leavenworth, Bonner Springs	Western end of US-24/US-40 concurrency
Wyandotte	Kansas City			410	110th Street	Exit numbers correspond to I-70; Access to Kansas Speedway
Wyandotte	Kansas City	229.03	368.59	411	I-435	Signed as exits 411A (south) and 411B (north)
Wyandotte	Kansas City			414	78th Street	
Wyandotte	Kansas City	232.94	374.88	415	Turner Diagonal / College Parkway	Diverging diamond interchange
Wyandotte	Kansas City	234.47	377.34	417	57th Street	
Wyandotte	Kansas City	236.08	379.93	418	I-635	Signed as exits 418A (north) and 418B (south) eastbound; westbound access is part of exit 419
Wyandotte	Kansas City	236.59	380.75	419	Park Drive / 38th Street	
Wyandotte	Kansas City	237.88– 237.98	382.83– 382.99	420	US-69 south (18th Street Expressway) / 18th Street north	Signed as exits 420A (south) and 420B (north)
Wyandotte	Kansas City	237.88– 237.98	382.83– 382.99		I-70 east / US-24 east / US-40 east / US-69 north – Kansas City	Continuation east; eastern end of I-70/US-24/US-40 concurrency
1.000 mi = 1.609 km; 1.000 km = 0.621 mi: Concurrency terminus; Incomplete access
