= Grant Township, Dickinson County, Kansas =

Grant Township
- Township
- Location in Dickinson County
- Coordinates: 38°54′55″N 097°12′16″W
- Country: United States
- State: Kansas
- County: Dickinson

Area
  - Total: 32.31 sq mi (83.69 km^{2})
  - Land: 31.80 sq mi (82.37 km^{2})
  - Water: 0.51 sq mi (1.32 km^{2}) 1.58%
- Elevation: 1,150 ft (350 m)

Population (2020)
  - Total: 916
  - Density: 28.8/sq mi (11.1/km^{2})
- GNIS feature ID: 0476667

Grant Township is a township in Dickinson County, Kansas, United States. As of the 2020 census, its population was 916.

== Geography ==
Grant Township covers an area of 32.31 square miles (83.7 km^{2}) and surrounds the incorporated settlement of Abilene. According to the USGS, it contains one cemetery, Saint Joseph.

The streams of Holland Creek, Mud Creek and Turkey Creek run through this township.

== Transportation ==
Grant Township contains one airport or landing strip, Wright Airpark.
