= List of Interstate Highways in Kansas =

- Highway markers for Interstate 70 and Interstate 135
- Interstate Highways highlighted in red

Highway names
- Interstates: Interstate nn (I-nn)
- US Highways: U.S. Highway nn (US-nn)
- State: K-nn

System links
- Kansas State Highway System; Interstate; US; State; Spurs

The Interstate Highways in Kansas are the segments of the Dwight D. Eisenhower National System of Interstate and Defense Highways within the U.S. state of Kansas.

== Primary highways ==
Number	Length (mi)	Length (km)	Southern or western terminus	Northern or eastern terminus	Formed	Removed	Notes
I-35	235.5	379.0	Oklahoma state line south of South Haven	Missouri state line in Kansas City	1956	current	Concurrent with the Kansas Turnpike for 127 miles from the Oklahoma state line to the junction with I-335 and US-50 in Emporia.
I-35W	95.7	154.0	I-35 / Kansas Turnpike in Wichita	I-70 / US-40 / US-81 in Salina	1971	1976	Renumbered I-135
I-66	—	—	Wichita, Kansas	Missouri State line	1991	2015	Cancelled proposed interstate that was planned to run from Wichita to the junction with I-73/I-74/US 52 in West Virginia as part of the East–West TransAmerica Corridor.
I-70	424.2	682.7	Colorado state line west of Kanorado	Missouri state line in Kansas City	1956	current	Concurrent with the Kansas Turnpike from the junction with I-470, US-40 and K-4 in East Topeka to the Turnpike's eastern terminus in the Kansas City area.

== Auxiliary highways ==
Number	Length (mi)	Length (km)	Southern or western terminus	Northern or eastern terminus	Formed	Removed	Notes
I-135	95.7	154.0	I-35 / Kansas Turnpike in Wichita	I-70 / US-40 / US-81 in Salina	1976	current	Originally signed as I-35W
I-235	16.5	26.6	I-135 / US-81 in Wichita	I-135 / US-81 / K-15 / K-96 / K-254 in Wichita	1962	current	
I-335	50.1	80.6	I-35 / Kansas Turnpike / US-50 in Emporia	I-470 / Kansas Turnpike / US-75 in Topeka	1987	current	Overlaps Kansas Turnpike for its entire length
I-435	28.17	45.34	Missouri state line in Kansas City	Missouri state line in Leawood (State Line Road)	1965	current	Kansas City beltway
I-470	13.72	22.08	I-70 / US-40 / K-4 / US-75 in Topeka	I-70 / Kansas Turnpike / US-40 / K-4 east of Topeka	1960	current	Concurrent with the Kansas Turnpike from the junction with I-335 in South Topeka to the junction with I-70, US-40 and K-4 in East Topeka.
I-635	8.9	14.3	I-35 / US-69 in Overland Park	Missouri state line in Kansas City	1975	current	
I-670	1.64	2.64	I-70 / US-24 / US-40 / US-69 in Kansas City	Missouri state line in Kansas City	1968	current	
