= Kansas Turnpike Authority =

Agency overview
- Formed: 1953
- Preceding agency: Kansas Highway Department (dissolved)
- Headquarters: 9401 East Kellogg Wichita, Kansas 67207
- Agency executives: David Lindstrom, Chair of the Authority Board; Steve Hewitt, Chief Executive Officer
- Website: ksturnpike.com

The Kansas Turnpike Authority (KTA) is the organization that owns and maintains the Kansas Turnpike.

== Authority board ==
The KTA is headed by a board of five members, two of which are appointed by the governor of the state. In addition, the Chairman of the Kansas Senate Transportation Committee as well as a member of the Kansas House Transportation Committee also serve on the board. The current secretary of the Kansas Department of Transportation is the fifth member of the board and also serves as the director of operations.

One board member is elected as the chairman of the board by the other four members. The current chairman is David Lindstrom, a Kansas City-area businessman and former Johnson County Commissioner and Kansas City Chiefs defensive end.

The KTA board consults with the CEO in approving major contracts, policies and the annual budget. Board members, as listed on the KTA web site, are below:

- David Lindstrom, Chairman
- Sen. Mike Petersen
- Rep. Richard J. Proehl
- Sen. Ty Masterson
- Richard Carlson, Secretary of Transportation

== Organization ==
The KTA employs over 400 people who are charged with maintaining, preserving, and redesigning the 236-mile (380 km) roadway and improving its function as a vital corridor to move people and goods in Kansas. These employees are led by the KTA's Chief Executive Officer, who reports to the KTA board, and a nine-member leadership team.

- Authority Board
  - Chief Executive Officer
    - Director of Engineering
    - Director of Technology
    - Director of Finance
    - KTA General Counsel
    - Director of Roadway Operations
    - Director of Business Services and Customer Relations
    - Commander of Kansas Highway Patrol Troop G
    - Human Resources Manager
    - Executive Assistant
