= U.S. Route 183 in Kansas =

Segment of American highway

U.S. Highway 183
- US-183 highlighted in red

Route information
- Maintained by KDOT
- Existed: c. 1931–present

Major junctions
- South end: US 183 at the Oklahoma state line near Buffalo, OK
- US-160 from Ashland to Coldwater; US-54 / US-400 west of Greensburg; US-50 / US-56 in Kinsley; K-156 east of Rozel; K-96 in Rush Center; K-4 east of Ransom; I-70 / US-40 in Hays; US-24 in Stockton; US-36 in Phillipsburg; K-383 east of Woodruff
- North end: US 183 at the Nebraska state line near Woodruff

Location
- Country: United States
- State: Kansas
- Counties: Clark, Comanche, Kiowa, Edwards, Pawnee, Rush, Ellis, Rooks, Phillips

Highway system
- United States Numbered Highway System; List; Special; Divided; Kansas State Highway System; Interstate; US; State; Spurs
← K-182	→ K-184

U.S. Route 183 (US-183) is a part of the U.S. Highway System that runs from US-77 in Refugio, Texas north to Interstate 90 (I-90) in Presho, South Dakota. In the U.S. state of Kansas, US-183 is a main north–south highway that runs from the Oklahoma border north to the Nebraska border.

Between 1930 and 1931, US-183 was extended south into Kansas to US-83 in Dresden. Then between July 1938 and 1939, US-183 was altered to follow US-36 east to K-1 in Phillipsburg, then south along K-1 to US-160. Then continued west along US-160 to K-34 in Sitka, which it followed south from Sitka to the Oklahoma border. Between 1941 and 1944, US-183 and US-83 were swapped within Nebraska and a small portion into Kansas, which straightened their alignment and eliminated the overlap between the two in Norton. The former alignment of US-83 from northeast of Selden to east of Woodruff became US-383, now K-383.

== Route description ==
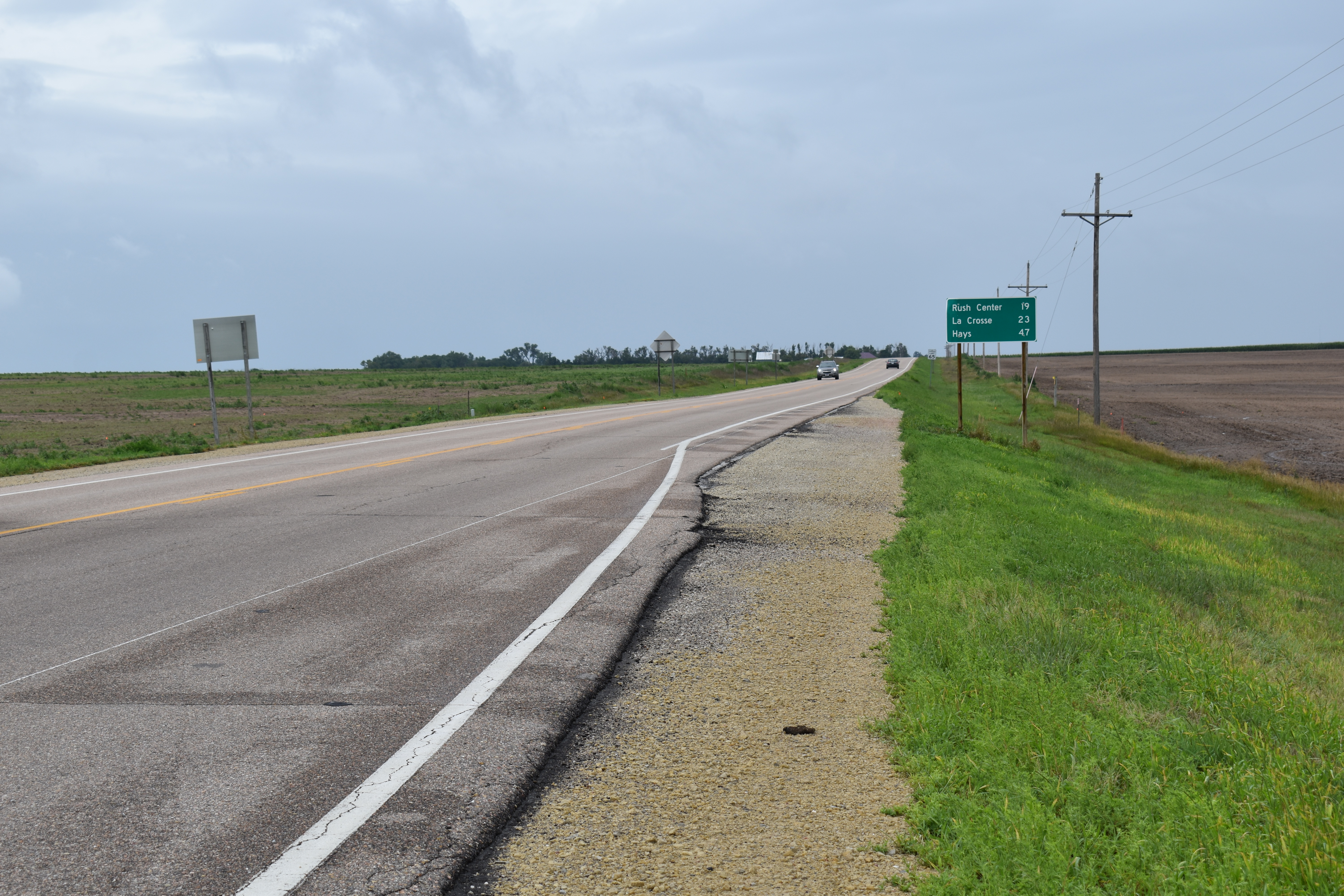
US-183 northbound from K-156

US-183 enters Kansas in Clark County and turns east at Sitka, where it overlaps US-160, entering Comanche County, where it passes through Protection. The highways stay paired as it turns north to pass through the Comanche County seat, Coldwater. At Coldwater, US-160 turns back to the east, and US-183 continues its northerly track.

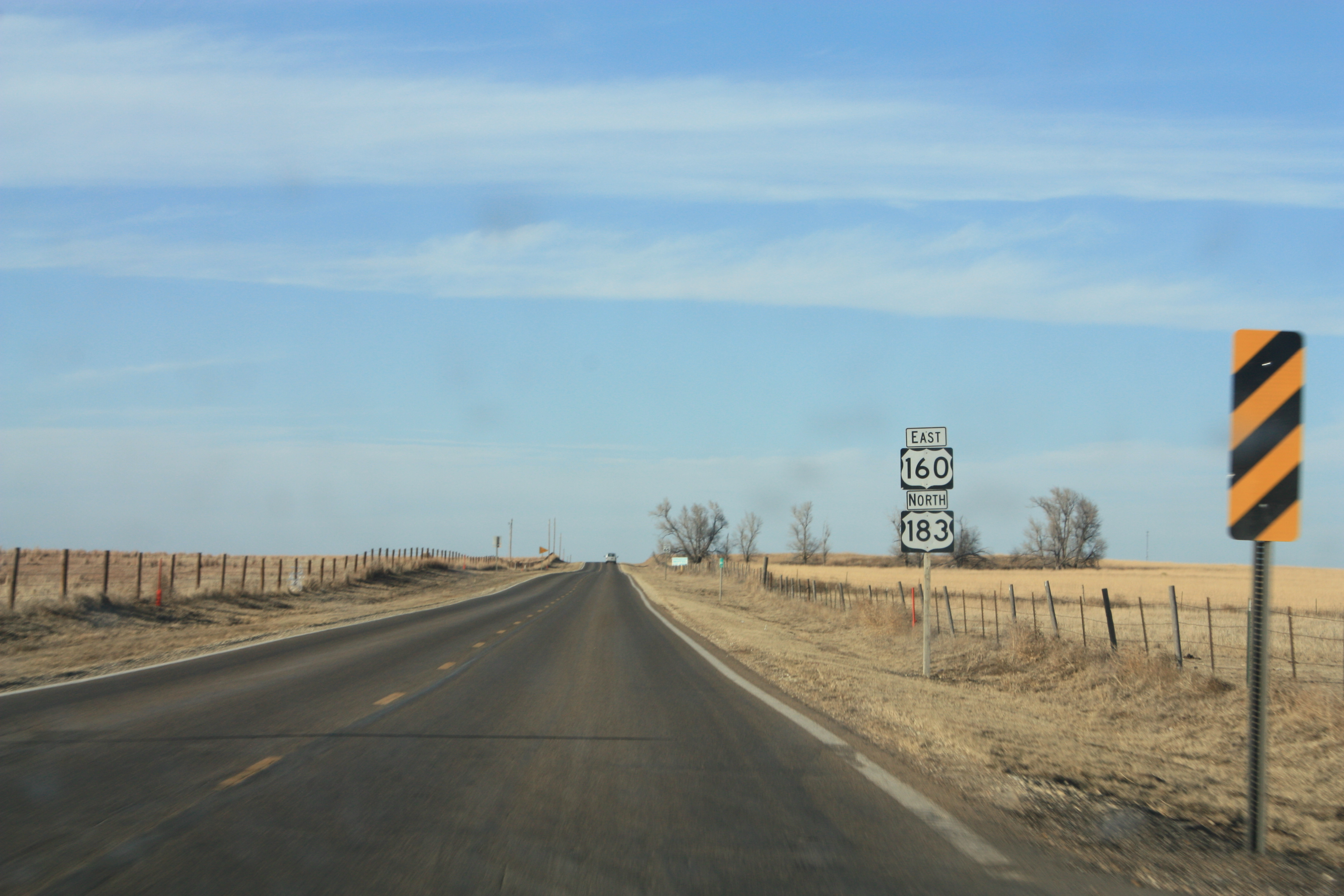
US-183 running concurrently with US-160 in southern Comanche County.

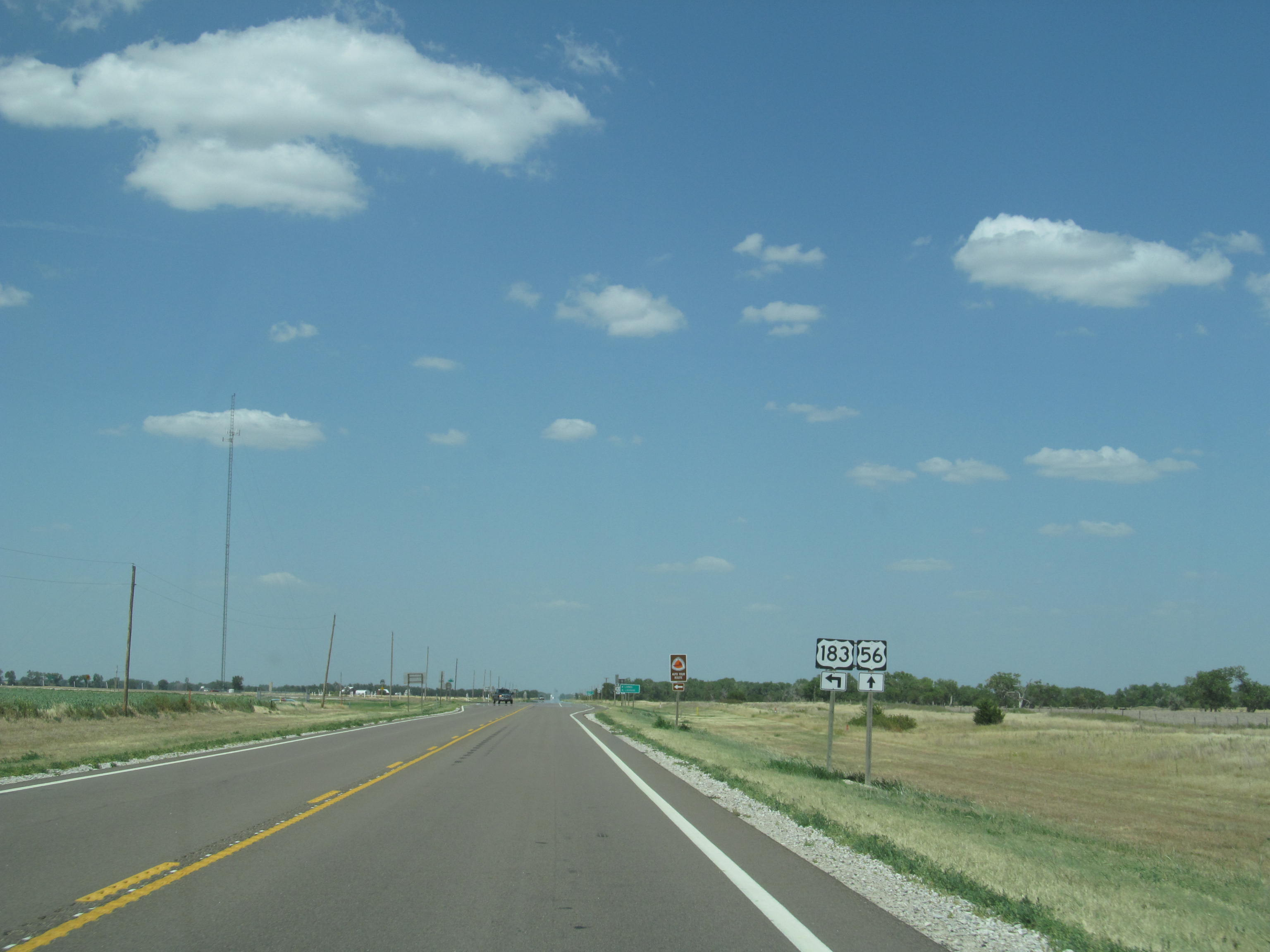
US-183 at north end of overlap with US-56 northeast of Kinsley

Entering Kiowa County, US-183 reaches a junction with US-54 and US-400, where it passes through Greensburg. In southern Edwards County, the highway makes a brief turn to the west before meeting up with US-56 in Kinsley, the Edwards County seat. US-56 and US-183 turn northeast before the highways split after entering Pawnee County. US-56 continues northeast toward Larned, and US-183 straightens out to pass through largely unpopulated areas in Edwards County.

In Rush County, US-183 intersects two primary east–west Kansas state highways, K-96 in Rush Center and K-4 in LaCrosse.

US-183 reaches the largest city along its route in Kansas, Hays, where a western bypass of the highway provides direct access to Gross Memorial Coliseum and Fort Hays State University. US-183 is known as Vine Street in Hays and contains numerous businesses. US-183 runs through town for three miles (5 km) before crossing Interstate 70, which is heavily traveled in Hays with traffic between Denver and Kansas City. The interchange of US-183 and I-70 has been designated as the CW2 Bryan J. Nichols Fallen Veterans Memorial Interchange.

North of Hays, the highway has been resurfaced and realigned for 23 miles (37 km) to Plainville, one of two towns in Rooks County US-183 serves. At Plainville, US-183 has a junction with K-18. US-183 continues 15 miles (24 km) north to Stockton, the Rooks County seat, where US-24 crosses.

The highway enters Phillips County approximately 12 miles (19 km) north of Stockton. US-183 meets US-36 west, and the highways join for a concurrency through the city of Phillipsburg. The highways split in downtown Phillipsburg, and US-183 has one last junction with K-383 before exiting the state south of Alma, Nebraska.

US-183 is two-laned throughout Kansas, except for the portion which runs through Hays.

== History ==
Between 1930 and 1931, US-183 was extended south into Kansas, across US-36, to US-83 in Dresden. Between July 1938 and 1939, US-183 was altered to follow US-36 east to K-1 in Phillipsburg, then south along K-1 to US-160. It then continued west along US-160 to K-34 in Sitka, which it followed south from Sitka to the Oklahoma border. Between 1941 and 1944, US-183 and US-83 were swapped within Nebraska and a small portion into Kansas, which straightened their alignment and eliminated the overlap between the two in Norton. The former alignment of US-83 from northeast of Selden to east of Woodruff became US-383, now K-383.

== Major intersections ==
County	Location	mi	km	Destinations	Notes
Clark		0.000	0.000	US 183 south	Continuation into Oklahoma
Clark				US-160 west / K-34 north – Bucklin, Ashland	Southern end of US-160 overlap; southern terminus of K-34
Comanche				K-1 south – Freedom OK	Northern terminus of K-1
Comanche				US-160 east (Gypsum Hills Scenic Byway) – Medicine Lodge	Northern end of US-160 overlap
Kiowa				US-54 / US-400 – Meade, Greensburg	
Edwards	Kinsley			US-50 – Dodge City, Hutchinson	
Edwards	Kinsley			US-56 – Dodge City	Southern end of US-56 overlap
Pawnee				US-56 east – Larned	Northern end of US-56 overlap
Pawnee				K-156 – Jetmore, Larned	Former US-156
Rush	Rush Center			K-96 (Union Street) – Ness City, Great Bend	
Rush	La Crosse			K-4 – McCracken, Hoisington	
Ellis	Hays			US 183 Byp. north – Ellis, Old Fort Hays	Southern terminus of US-183 Byp.
Ellis	Hays			I-70 / US-40 – Salina, Denver	I-70 exit 159
Rooks	Plainville			K-18 – Hill City, Lincoln	
Rooks	Stockton			US-24 – Hill City, Osborne	
Phillips	Glade			K-9 – Logan, Kirwin	
Phillips	Phillipsburg			US-36 east – Smith Center	Southern end of US-36 overlap
Phillips	Phillipsburg			US-36 west (State Street west) – Norton	Northern end of US-36 overlap
Phillips				K-383 south – Almena, Norton	Northern terminus of K-383; former US-383 south
Phillips				US 183 north – Alma	Continuation into Nebraska; former US 383 north
1.000 mi = 1.609 km; 1.000 km = 0.621 mi: Concurrency terminus

== Bypass ==
U.S. Highway 183 Bypass
- Location: Hays

U.S. Route 183 Bypass (US-183 Bypass) is a bypass route in Hays. It begins at US-183 and runs north and ends at I-70 and US-40.

U.S. Route 183
Previous state: Oklahoma	Kansas	Next state: Nebraska
