= Loretto, Kansas =

Unincorporated community in Rush County, Kansas

- Unincorporated community
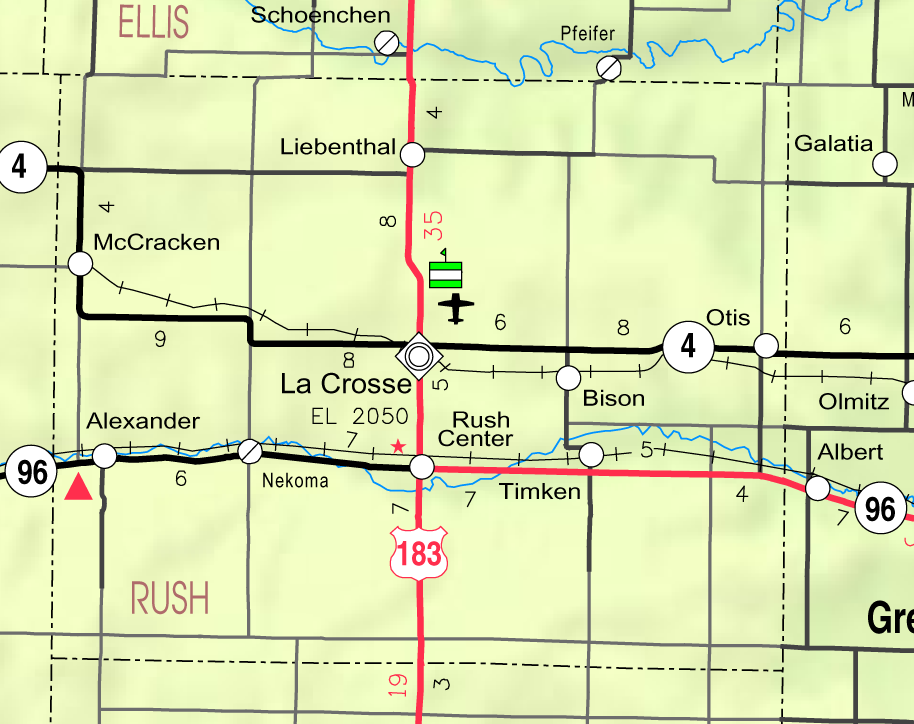
- KDOT map of Rush County (legend)

- Location within Kansas Location within the United States
- Coordinates: 38°39′13″N 99°10′50″W
- Country: United States
- State: Kansas
- County: Rush
- Township: Illinois
- Founded: 1876
- Elevation: 2,001 ft (610 m)
- Time zone: UTC-6 (CST)
  - Summer (DST): UTC-5 (CDT)
- Area code: 785
- FIPS code: 20-42750
- GNIS ID: 475395

Loretto is an unincorporated community in Rush County, Kansas, United States. It is located 7.5 miles (12.1 km) east of Liebenthal, and 3.5 miles (5.6 km) south of Pfeifer.

== History ==
The community was founded in 1876, and named with the same name as the Illinois township where it was located. Its name evolved over time from Illinois to Marienfeld to Loretto.

== Education ==
The community is served by Otis–Bison USD 403 public school district.
