= Nekoma, Kansas =

Unincorporated community in Rush County, Kansas

- Unincorporated community
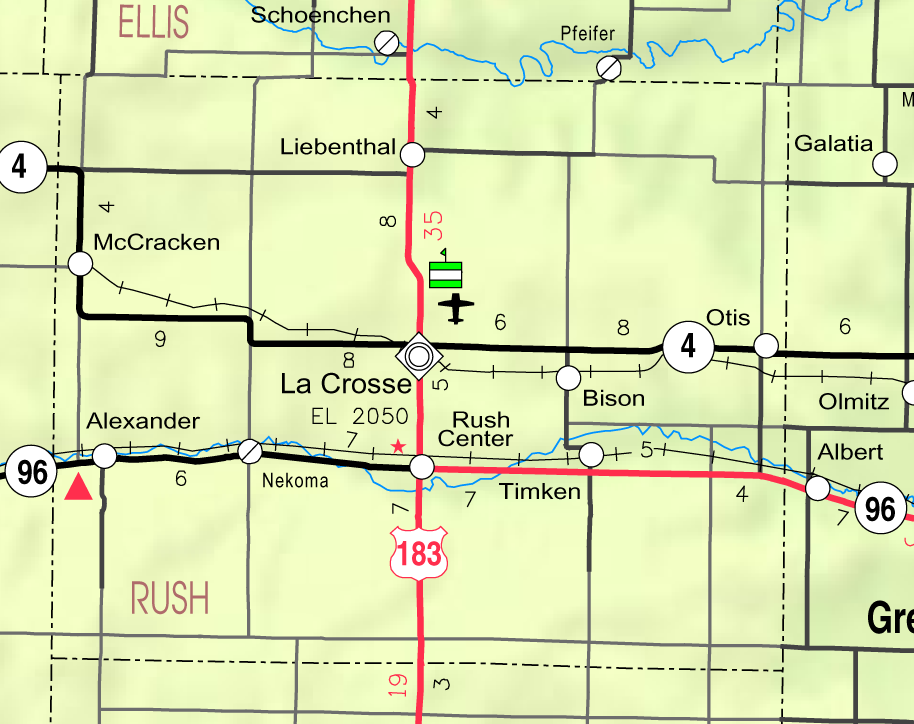
- KDOT map of Rush County (legend)

- Location within Kansas Location within the United States
- Coordinates: 38°28′25″N 99°26′31″W
- Country: United States
- State: Kansas
- County: Rush
- Elevation: 2,034 ft (620 m)
- Time zone: UTC-6 (CST)
  - Summer (DST): UTC-5 (CDT)
- ZIP Code: 67559
- Area code: 785
- FIPS code: 20-49575
- GNIS ID: 475606

Nekoma is an unincorporated community in Rush County, Kansas, United States. It lies along K-96 southwest of the city of La Crosse.

== History ==
Nekoma was platted in 1884 by the railroad. The first post office in Nekoma was established in 1890.

It has a post office with the ZIP Code 67559.

== Education ==
The community is served by La Crosse USD 395 public school district.
