= Hargrave, Kansas =

Unincorporated community in Rush County, Kansas

- Unincorporated community
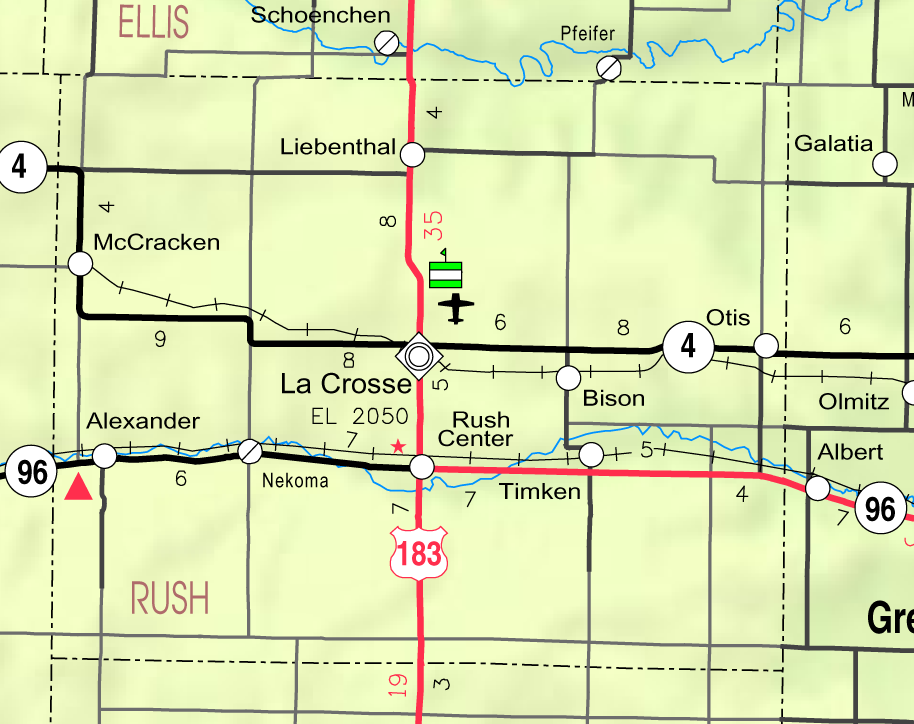
- KDOT map of Rush County (legend)

- Location within Kansas Location within the United States
- Coordinates: 38°33′23″N 99°26′42″W
- Country: United States
- State: Kansas
- County: Rush
- Elevation: 2,182 ft (665 m)
- Time zone: UTC-6 (CST)
  - Summer (DST): UTC-5 (CDT)
- Area code: 785
- FIPS code: 20-30025
- GNIS ID: 484735

Hargrave is an unincorporated community in Rush County, Kansas, United States. It is located approximately seven miles west of La Crosse on the north side of K-4 highway next to the Kansas and Oklahoma Railroad.

== History ==
Hargrave had a post office between the 1890s and 1950.

== Education ==
The community is served by La Crosse USD 395 public school district.
