= Hampton, Kansas =

Ghost town in Rush County, Kansas

- Ghost town
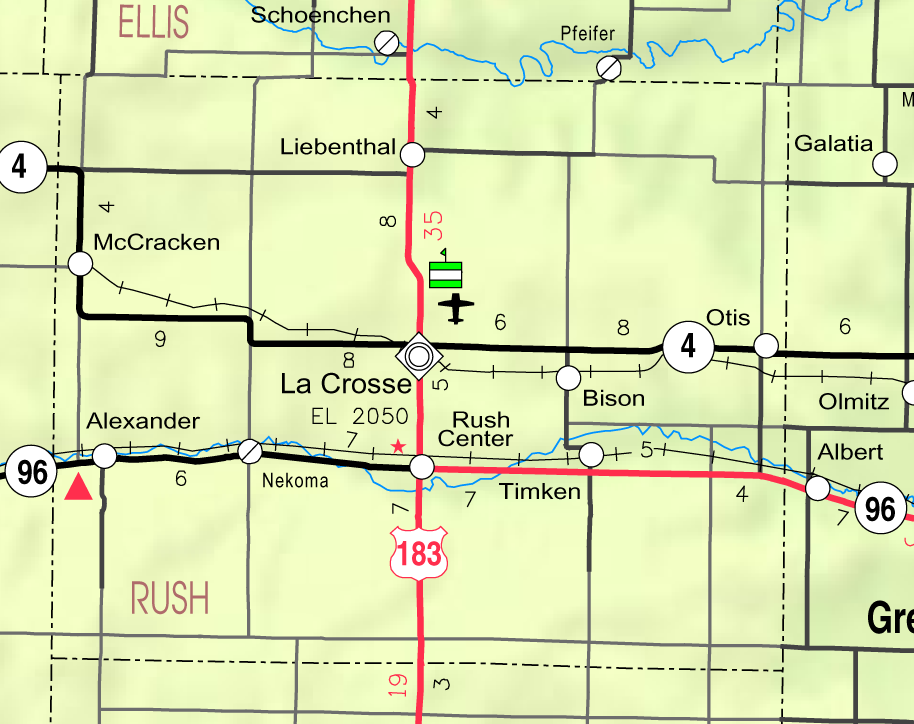
- KDOT map of Rush County (legend)

- Location within Kansas Location within the United States
- Coordinates: 38°35′42″N 99°28′46″W
- Country: United States
- State: Kansas
- County: Rush
- Founded: 1876
- Elevation: 2,070 ft (630 m)

Population
  - Total: 0
- Time zone: UTC-6 (CST)
  - Summer (DST): UTC-5 (CDT)
- Area code: 785
- GNIS ID: 482541

Hampton is a ghost town in Rush County, Kansas, United States.

== History ==
Established in 1876, Hampton took its name from its first settler, Joe Hampton. Within a few years, it would grow to a population of 35, gaining a hotel, a blacksmith shop, a school, and for a brief time a stagecoach service. Hampton begin to decline in the mid 1880's, mostly due to the nearby town of McCracken being established along a new rail line. In 1910, Hampton's post office closed. All that remains of the town is the foundation of the schoolhouse and a cemetery.
