= Bison, Kansas =

City in Rush County, Kansas

- City
- Location within Rush County and Kansas

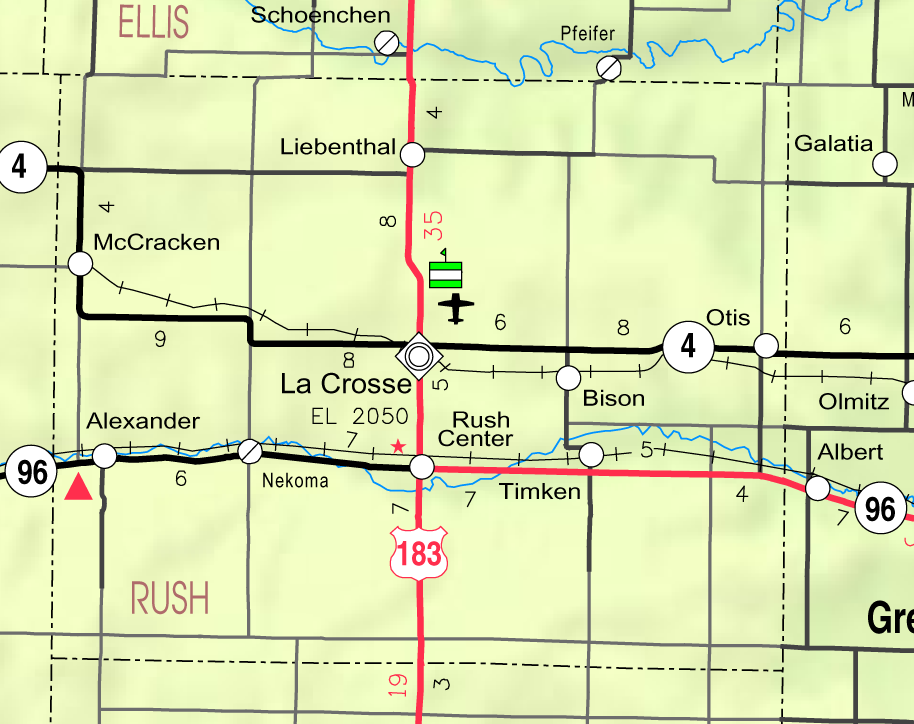
- KDOT map of Rush County (legend)
- Coordinates: 38°31′12″N 99°11′52″W
- Country: United States
- State: Kansas
- County: Rush
- Founded: 1880s
- Platted: 1888
- Incorporated: 1912
- Named for: American bison

Area
  - Total: 0.27 sq mi (0.69 km^{2})
  - Land: 0.27 sq mi (0.69 km^{2})
  - Water: 0 sq mi (0.00 km^{2})
- Elevation: 2,015 ft (614 m)

Population (2020)
  - Total: 179
  - Density: 670/sq mi (260/km^{2})
- Time zone: UTC-6 (CST)
  - Summer (DST): UTC-5 (CDT)
- ZIP Code: 67520
- Area code: 785
- FIPS code: 20-06950
- GNIS ID: 2394177

Bison is a city in Rush County, Kansas, United States. As of the 2020 census, the population of the city was 179.

== History ==
The community was platted in 1888 by the Missouri Pacific Railroad. It was named for the American bison, which once grazed there.

The first post office in Bison was established in May 1888.

In 1912 one of the worst tornadoes on record to hit Kansas struck the town of Bison, leaving two dead and 11 injured.

== Geography ==
According to the United States Census Bureau, the city has a total area of 0.26 square miles (0.67 km^{2}), all land.

=== Climate ===
The climate in this area is characterized by hot, humid summers and generally mild to cool winters. According to the Köppen Climate Classification system, Bison has a humid subtropical climate, abbreviated "Cfa" on climate maps.

== Demographics ==
Historical population
Census	Pop.	Note	%±
1920	357		—
1930	397		11.2%
1940	366		−7.8%
1950	326		−10.9%
1960	291		−10.7%
1970	285		−2.1%
1980	279		−2.1%
1990	252		−9.7%
2000	235		−6.7%
2010	255		8.5%
2020	179		−29.8%
U.S. Decennial Census

=== 2020 census ===
The 2020 United States census counted 179 people, 85 households, and 53 families in Bison. The population density was 675.5 per square mile (260.8/km^{2}). There were 109 housing units at an average density of 411.3 per square mile (158.8/km^{2}). The racial makeup was 93.3% (167) white or European American (92.74% non-Hispanic white), 0.0% (0) black or African-American, 0.0% (0) Native American or Alaska Native, 0.0% (0) Asian, 0.0% (0) Pacific Islander or Native Hawaiian, 1.12% (2) from other races, and 5.59% (10) from two or more races. Hispanic or Latino of any race was 6.15% (11) of the population.

Of the 85 households, 21.2% had children under the age of 18; 45.9% were married couples living together; 22.4% had a female householder with no spouse or partner present. 31.8% of households consisted of individuals and 12.9% had someone living alone who was 65 years of age or older. The average household size was 1.9 and the average family size was 2.1. The percent of those with a bachelor's degree or higher was estimated to be 10.1% of the population.

15.6% of the population was under the age of 18, 6.1% from 18 to 24, 19.0% from 25 to 44, 35.8% from 45 to 64, and 23.5% who were 65 years of age or older. The median age was 51.5 years. For every 100 females, there were 82.7 males. For every 100 females ages 18 and older, there were 86.4 males.

The 2016–2020 5-year American Community Survey estimates show that the median household income was $53,056 (with a margin of error of +/- $19,993) and the median family income was $55,156 (+/- $4,014). Males had a median income of $36,875 (+/- $5,096) versus $20,417 (+/- $6,555) for females. The median income for those above 16 years old was $24,000 (+/- $13,525). Approximately, 5.1% of families and 9.3% of the population were below the poverty line, including 33.3% of those under the age of 18 and 0.0% of those ages 65 or over.

=== 2010 census ===
As of the census of 2010, there were 255 people, 104 households, and 72 families residing in the city. The population density was 980.8 inhabitants per square mile (378.7/km^{2}). There were 118 housing units at an average density of 453.8 per square mile (175.2/km^{2}). The racial makeup of the city was 97.6% White, 0.8% Native American, 0.4% from other races, and 1.2% from two or more races. Hispanic or Latino of any race were 0.4% of the population.

There were 104 households, of which 31.7% had children under the age of 18 living with them, 58.7% were married couples living together, 6.7% had a female householder with no husband present, 3.8% had a male householder with no wife present, and 30.8% were non-families. 20.2% of all households were made up of individuals, and 6.7% had someone living alone who was 65 years of age or older. The average household size was 2.45 and the average family size was 2.85.

The median age in the city was 40.9 years. 23.5% of residents were under the age of 18; 9.8% were between the ages of 18 and 24; 20.8% were from 25 to 44; 34.5% were from 45 to 64; and 11.4% were 65 years of age or older. The gender makeup of the city was 48.2% male and 51.8% female.

== Education ==
The community is served by Otis–Bison USD 403 public school district. School unification consolidated Bison and Otis schools forming USD 403. The Otis-Bison High School mascot is Cougars.

Bison schools were closed through school unification. The Bison High School mascot was Buffaloes.
