= The Best Thing Ever =

American punk band

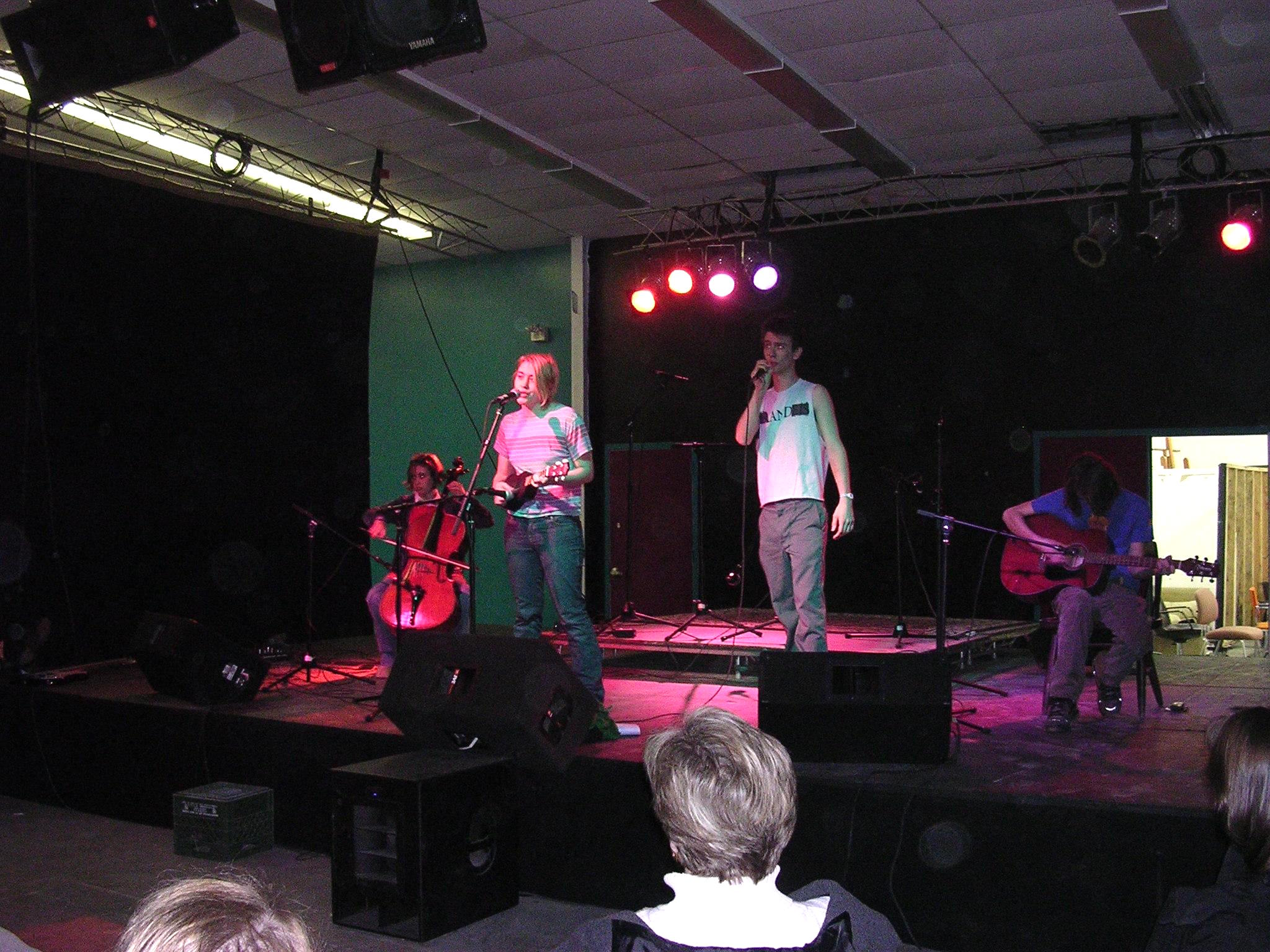
- The Best Thing Ever's original lineup performing at SUNY Purchase. (L to R) Jen Page, Emilyn Brodsky, Noah Britton, and Alex Billig

Background information
- Origin: Boston & Westchester, U.S.
- Genre: Punk
- Years active: 2003-present
- Label: HIG Records
- Members: Noah Britton; Alex Billig; Jen Page
- Past members: Emilyn Brodsky
- Website: http://www.thebestthingever.org

The Best Thing Ever is a punk band/performance art group formed by autistic singer/songwriter Noah Britton in the summer of 2003. The label "punk" is adequate to describe the band's influences and ethics, but their songs and sound varied drastically from show to show, including singer-songwriter, hardcore punk, opera, twee, rap, classical, noise, a cappella, synth-pop, musical theater, rock, spoken word, experimental, and country..

== Biography ==
The Best Thing Ever's original lineup consisted of Noah Britton, Alex Billig, Jennifer Page, and Emilyn Brodsky. Although the band officially consisted of four people, they played in various incarnations. Britton was the only constant member.

In 2004, Brodsky decided to leave The Best Thing Ever to make it on her own.

On May 1, 2006, Britton, Billig, and Page officially revived The Best Thing Ever moniker before embarking on The Bathroom Tour. For twelve straight days, The Best Thing Ever invaded bathrooms across New England to perform their music for unsuspecting audiences.

The Bathroom Tour DVD, which documents the events of the tour, was released in April 2007. Most of it was filmed by Eric Williams of The Eskalators but part of it was filmed by Josh Safdie. It was edited by Jon Rotberg.

In the summer of 2007, the band reunited for The Surprise Tour, playing exclusively unbooked shows all over the country with acts including Andrew Bird and Gravy Train!!!!. Venues included the Kansas Barbed Wire Museum, the Mall of America, Corn Palace, and Rock and Roll Hall of Fame, where they put up their own exhibit as inductees for the class of 2007. A film documenting the tour was released on April 1, 2011, shot by Eric Williams of The Eskalators and edited by Benny Safdie and Laura Meoli.

During the last week of June 2008, the band went on what they claimed would be their last tour, The Retirement Tour, a tour of retirement-related venues. However, in April, 2009, they played a surprise show at a donut shop in Allston, Massachusetts. They now claim that The Retirement Tour never happened, and that they will continue to perform occasionally.

In February 2010, the band went on The Animals Tour, performing exclusively for animals in the New York City area, including surprise shows at a zoo and an aquarium, and a booked show at a dog shelter, which was filmed and edited by Benny Safdie.

On April 1, 2011, The Best Thing Ever premiered The Surprise Tour DVD at UnionDocs in Brooklyn, NY. They decided to only screen this film every April 1 in a different state, and continue to do so annually. Screenings so far have been 2011 in NY, 2012 in MA, 2013 in PA, 2014 in WA, 2015 in OH, 2016 in RI, in 2017 Vancouver, Canada, 2018 in CA, 2019 in CO, 2020 in HI, 2021 in AK, 2022 in NM, 2023 in ND, 2024 in MT, 2025 in MO, and 2026 in NJ.

In April, 2024, The Best Thing Ever performed a 20th anniversary reunion concert in Cambridge, Massachusetts, backed with a choir, as well as a performance in Northampton, Massachusetts where they were backed by Young@Heart Chorus.

In May, 2026, in honor of the 20th anniversary of The Bathroom Tour, The Best Thing Ever traveled to New York City and performed "The Shortest Tour Ever" by sneaking into the single-person bathroom at Alice Tully Hall at Lincoln Center and playing one note for an audience they brought with them.

== Filmography ==
DVDs

Year	Title	Label
2007	The Bathroom Tour	HIG Records
2011	The Surprise Tour	HIG Records
