= La Crosse USD 395 =

Public school district in La Crosse, Kansas

Address
- 616 Main St. La Crosse, Kansas, 67548; United States
- Coordinates: 38°31′45″N 99°18′33″W

District information
- Type: Public
- Grades: K to 12
- Schools: 2

Other information
- Website: usd395.org

La Crosse USD 395 is a public unified school district headquartered in La Crosse, Kansas, United States. The district includes the communities of Alexander, La Crosse, Liebenthal, McCracken, Rush Center, Hargrave, Nekoma, and nearby rural areas. Most of the district is in Rush County, the remainder spread across Ellis, Ness, and Trego counties.

== Schools ==
The school district operates the following schools:

- La Crosse Junior-Senior High School.
- La Cross Elementary School.

== See also ==
- Kansas State Department of Education
- Kansas State High School Activities Association
- List of high schools in Kansas
- List of unified school districts in Kansas
