= Eskalators =

- Origin: Brooklyn, New York, United States
- Genre: Punk
- Years active: 2007 – Present
- Label: Never Break Down

The Eskalators are an American Brooklyn-based steampunk and vegan musical collective, puppeteering ensemble, and experimental street mime troupe, formed by Eric Williams in the summer of 2007. The group is known for holding elaborate, public performances, fire poi artistry, and flash mobs on New York City Subway cars without formal written consent from the subway's operator, the MTA.

== Founding ==
Eric Williams was driving cross-country with the members of The Best Thing Ever to film a documentary about them. During the middle of the trip, he decided to start his own band to open shows for The Best Thing Ever, and was soon joined by Alec Billig and Jennifer Page of The Best Thing Ever. They played their first show on an escalator at the Mall of America.

The Eskalators released their first recording, Never Break Down, in April 2008. Shortly after, New York City promoter Joe Ahearn approached the band about performing on a subway car before one of his upcoming shows. The Eskalators agreed, and have continued to play subway shows, each centered on a different Subway station and train line.

== Members ==
Active members include:

- Vocals, Fire Poi – Eric Williams
- Violin – Wen-Jay Ying
- Flute – Amanda Rodi
- Flute – Marie Miller
- Melodica – Sanji Moore
- Glockenspiel – Guia Adiao
- Electric guitar – Peter Naddeo
- Air guitar – Mark Storella
- Clarinet – Ahuro Nina
- Bass guitar – Dan Byer
- Djembe – Davide Pivi
- Keyboard – Melissa "Bostian" Frost
- Saxophone – Janelle Jones
- Trumpet – Alec Billig
- Drums – Chris Parker
- Musical Saw – Annmarie Nye, Nina Hazen
- Accordion – Ben Morse
- Washboard – Matt Bennett

== Discography ==
EPs

Year	Title	Label
2008	Never Break Down	Never Break Down Records
2009	Cats & Dogs Living Together	Never Break Down Records
