= Schaffer, Kansas =

Unincorporated community in Rush County, Kansas

Coordinates: 38°28′17″N 99°05′19″W

Schaffer is an unincorporated community in Rush County, Kansas, United States.

== History ==
Schaffer had a post office between 1892 and 1948.

== Education ==
The community is served by Otis–Bison USD 403 public school district.
