= Ryan, Kansas =

Ghost town in Rush County, Kansas

- Ghost town
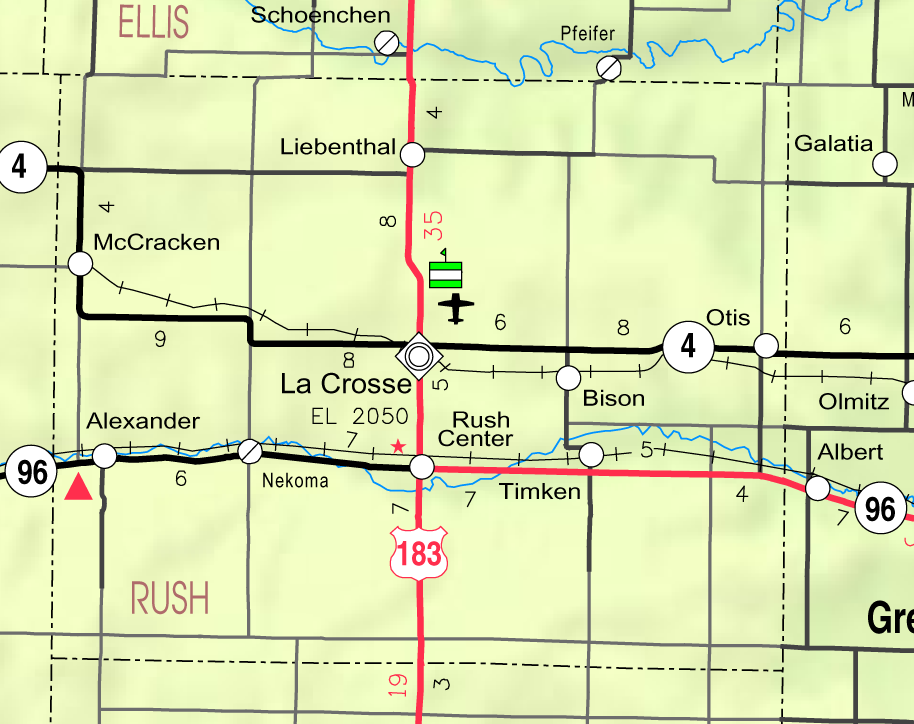
- KDOT map of Rush County (legend)

- Location within Kansas Location within the United States
- Coordinates: 38°21′30″N 99°05′15″W
- Country: United States
- State: Kansas
- County: Rush
- Elevation: 2,031 ft (619 m)

Population
  - Total: 0
- Time zone: UTC-6 (CST)
  - Summer (DST): UTC-5 (CDT)
- Area code: 785
- GNIS ID: 482552

Ryan is a ghost town in Rush County, Kansas, United States.

== History ==
Ryan was issued a post office in 1878. The post office was discontinued in 1908.
