= Alexander, Kansas =

City in Rush County, Kansas

- City
- Location within Rush County and Kansas

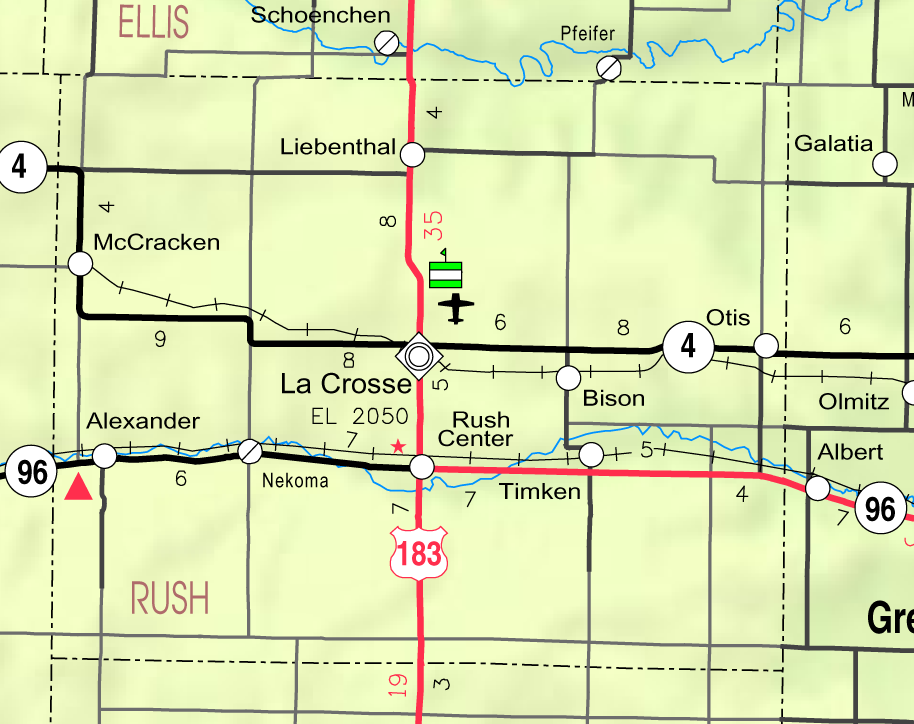
- KDOT map of Rush County (legend)
- Coordinates: 38°28′10″N 99°33′11″W
- Country: United States
- State: Kansas
- County: Rush
- Founded: 1869
- Incorporated: 1926
- Named for: Alexander Harvey

Area
  - Total: 0.26 sq mi (0.67 km^{2})
  - Land: 0.26 sq mi (0.67 km^{2})
  - Water: 0 sq mi (0.00 km^{2})
- Elevation: 2,077 ft (633 m)

Population (2020)
  - Total: 54
  - Density: 210/sq mi (81/km^{2})
- Time zone: UTC-6 (CST)
  - Summer (DST): UTC-5 (CDT)
- ZIP Code: 67513
- Area code: 785
- FIPS code: 20-01050
- GNIS ID: 2393916

Alexander is a city in Rush County, Kansas, United States. As of the 2020 census, the population of the city was 54.

== History ==
=== 19th century ===
Alexander is the oldest city in Rush County, Kansas. It was established in 1869 after becoming an important stopping point on the Fort Hays/Fort Dodge Trail (officially a part of the Santa Fe Trail). The name of the town originated from Alexander Harvey a Scottish emigrant who operated a stockaded trading post on the trail crossing of the Wet Walnut Creek. Harvey was a prominent and connected figure in western settlement. He was a friend of renown trapper, trader, and Indian Agent William Bent who established Bent's Fort in Eastern Colorado. Harvey's daughter Adaline at age 20 married the 60 year-old Bent.

In its early days, Alexander was a trading post for trappers, buffalo hunters, wild horse wranglers, and other early Westerners. Buffalo Bill Cody, George Custer, and other prominent figures in American western settlement traveled through the community. Alexander Harvey himself was a former member of the 6th Cavalry.

The first post office in Alexander was established in February 1874.

At its peak in the late 1800s, the community included a bank, hospital, newspaper, lumberyard, a Santa Fe Railroad Depot, hotel, multiple churches, multiple grocery and general stores. At varying times, the community's commercial activity has included cream and egg buying stations, a railroad stockyard for shipping cattle and sheep to eastern markets, and multiple grain elevators.

=== 21st century ===
Today, Alexander's abandoned three story brick school building is a landmark on K-96 highway. The former Alexander State Bank Building has been re-built and is now the operations and maintenance building for NJR Clean Energy. The community still has the largest grain elevator in Rush County. The elevator is a farmer's cooperative elevator owned by area farmers. Grumbine's Metal Scrap Yard is the other commercial entity in the community.

In 2015, the "Alexander Wind Farm" was constructed south of Alexander. It cost about $85 million and generates 48 Megawatt of power. The Alexander Wind Farm became commercially operative on January 1, 2016.

== Geography ==
According to the United States Census Bureau, the city has a total area of 0.25 square miles (0.65 km^{2}), all land.

=== Climate ===
The climate in this area is characterized by hot, humid summers and generally mild to cool winters. According to the Köppen Climate Classification system, Alexander has a humid subtropical climate, abbreviated "Cfa" on climate maps.

== Demographics ==
Historical population
Census	Pop.	Note	%±
1930	202		—
1940	171		−15.3%
1950	188		9.9%
1960	153		−18.6%
1970	129		−15.7%
1980	116		−10.1%
1990	85		−26.7%
2000	75		−11.8%
2010	65		−13.3%
2020	54		−16.9%
U.S. Decennial Census

=== 2020 census ===
The 2020 United States census counted 54 people, 29 households, and 16 families in Alexander. The population density was 208.5 per square mile (80.5/km^{2}). There were 32 housing units at an average density of 123.6 per square mile (47.7/km^{2}). The racial makeup was 90.74% (49) white or European American (74.07% non-Hispanic white), 1.85% (1) black or African-American, 0.0% (0) Native American or Alaska Native, 1.85% (1) Asian, 0.0% (0) Pacific Islander or Native Hawaiian, 0.0% (0) from other races, and 5.56% (3) from two or more races. Hispanic or Latino of any race was 20.37% (11) of the population.

Of the 29 households, 24.1% had children under the age of 18; 37.9% were married couples living together; 24.1% had a female householder with no spouse or partner present. 41.4% of households consisted of individuals and 27.6% had someone living alone who was 65 years of age or older. The average household size was 1.4 and the average family size was 2.5. The percent of those with a bachelor's degree or higher was estimated to be 5.6% of the population.

18.5% of the population was under the age of 18, 5.6% from 18 to 24, 16.7% from 25 to 44, 25.9% from 45 to 64, and 33.3% who were 65 years of age or older. The median age was 58.7 years. For every 100 females, there were 86.2 males. For every 100 females ages 18 and older, there were 76.0 males.

The 2016–2020 5-year American Community Survey estimates show that the median household income was $20,313 (with a margin of error of +/- $14,782) and the median family income was $63,250 (+/- $40,020). Approximately, 0.0% of families and 21.7% of the population were below the poverty line, including 0.0% of those under the age of 18 and 46.7% of those ages 65 or over.

=== 2010 census ===
As of the census of 2010, there were 65 people, 31 households, and 20 families residing in the city. The population density was 260.0 inhabitants per square mile (100.4/km^{2}). There were 42 housing units at an average density of 168.0 per square mile (64.9/km^{2}). The racial makeup of the city was 100.0% White.

There were 31 households, of which 16.1% had children under the age of 18 living with them, 54.8% were married couples living together, 6.5% had a female householder with no husband present, 3.2% had a male householder with no wife present, and 35.5% were non-families. 35.5% of all households were made up of individuals, and 19.4% had someone living alone who was 65 years of age or older. The average household size was 2.10 and the average family size was 2.70.

The median age in the city was 53.3 years. 13.8% of residents were under the age of 18; 7.7% were between the ages of 18 and 24; 12.2% were from 25 to 44; 41.6% were from 45 to 64; and 24.6% were 65 years of age or older. The gender makeup of the city was 40.0% male and 60.0% female.

== Education ==
The community is served by La Crosse USD 395 public school district.

Alexander High School was closed in 1966 through school unification. The Alexander High School mascot was Whippets.
