= Kansas Barbed Wire Museum =

Museum in La Crosse, Kansas

Coordinates: 38°31′29″N 99°18′41″W

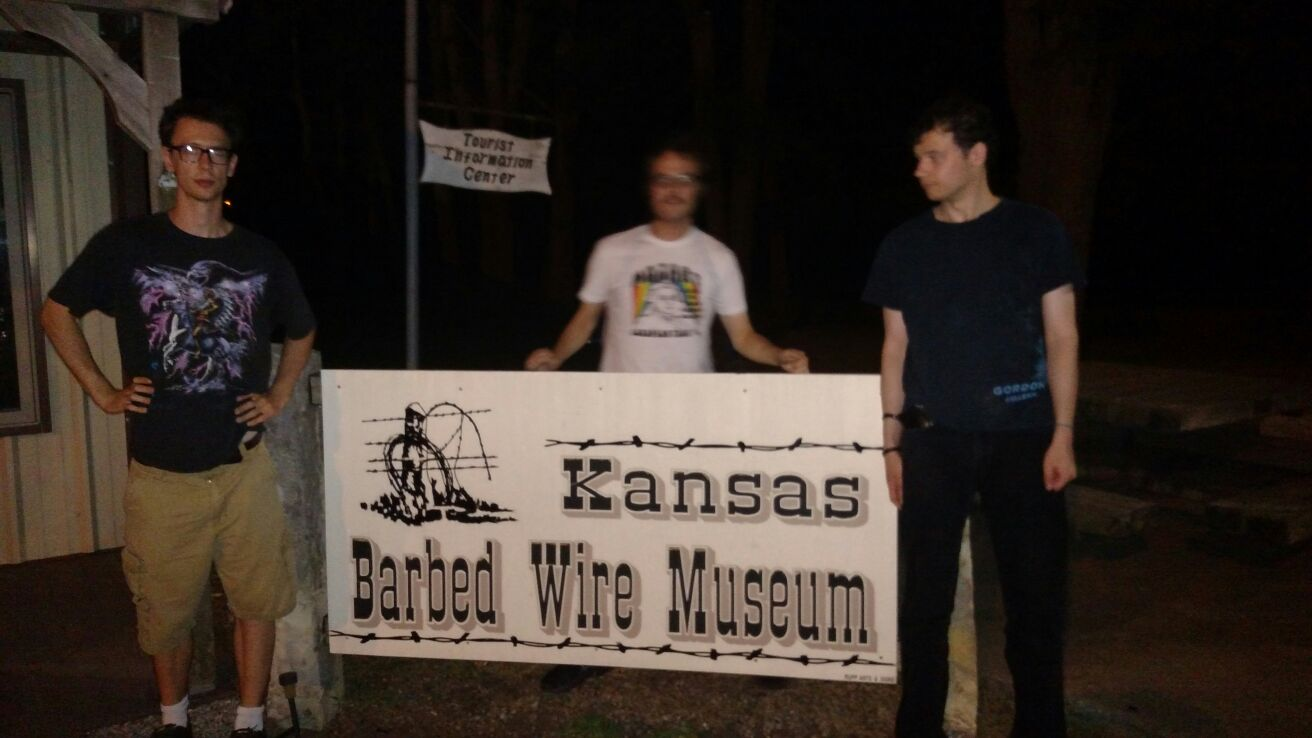
- Asperger's Are Us at Kansas Barbed Wire Museum

The Kansas Barbed Wire Museum is a barbed wire museum located in La Crosse, Kansas, United States, a city known as the “Barbed Wire Capital of the World.” The museum focuses on barbed wire, displaying over 2,400 different forms of the wire and telling its history.

== Collections ==
The museum hosts a vast collection of barbed wire varieties, dating back as far as the 1870s, as well as dioramas illustrating barbed wire history, and other memorabilia including liniments to cure barbed wire injuries. The exhibits also display 500 varieties of tools used for producing barbed wire. The museum is home to a "Barbed Wire Hall of Fame", an archive and a theatre.

== History ==
Barbed wire played a significant role in the history of the settlement of the United States and forever changed the face of the prairie.

The museum was established in 1970 in a small storefront on Main Street in downtown La Crosse, Kansas. By 1990, the collections had grown so much that a new building was constructed adjacent to the Post Rock Museum and Rush County Historical Museum in Grass Park at the south edge of the community. In 2004, an addition was constructed on the building to house the headquarters of the Antique Barbed Wire Society and the Larry Greer Research Center. The Antique Barbed Wire Society is an international organization “committed to collecting, preserving, exhibiting, and interpreting the historical heritage of barb wire and barbed wire related items.” The Larry Greer Research Center houses collections of publications related to the history of barbed wire and a complete collection of patents related to barbed wire and related items.
