= Otis, Kansas =

City in Rush County, Kansas

- City
- Location within Rush County and Kansas

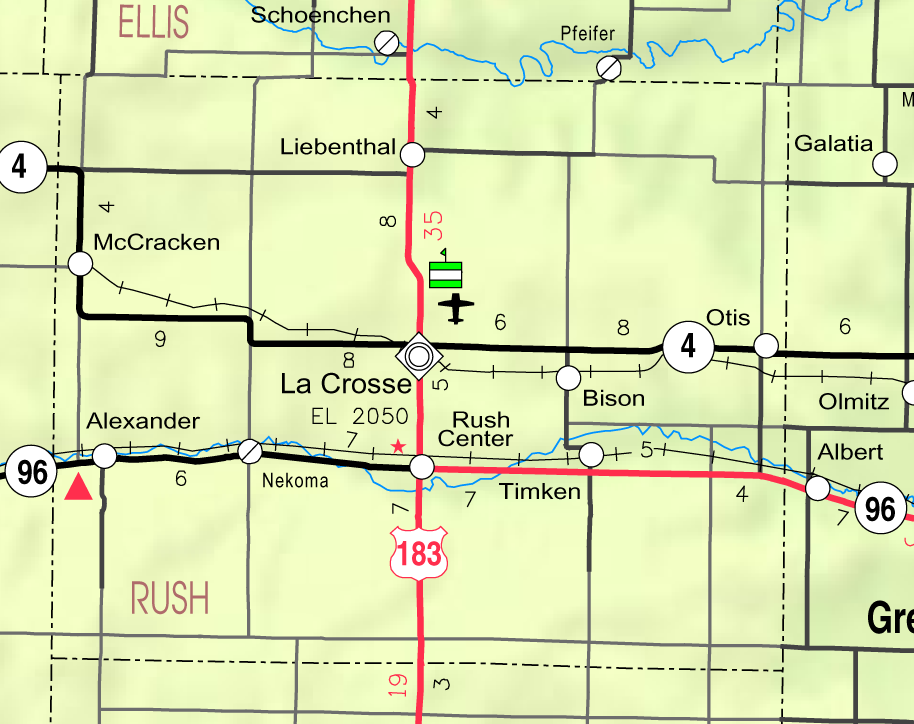
- KDOT map of Rush County (legend)
- Coordinates: 38°32′05″N 99°03′13″W
- Country: United States
- State: Kansas
- County: Rush
- Founded: 1886
- Incorporated: 1911
- Named for: Otis Modderwell

Area
  - Total: 0.31 sq mi (0.81 km^{2})
  - Land: 0.31 sq mi (0.81 km^{2})
  - Water: 0 sq mi (0.00 km^{2})
- Elevation: 2,038 ft (621 m)

Population (2020)
  - Total: 296
  - Density: 950/sq mi (370/km^{2})
- Time zone: UTC-6 (CST)
  - Summer (DST): UTC-5 (CDT)
- ZIP Code: 67565
- Area code: 785
- FIPS code: 20-53525
- GNIS ID: 2396103

Otis is a city in Rush County, Kansas, United States. As of the 2020 census, the population of the city was 296.

== History ==
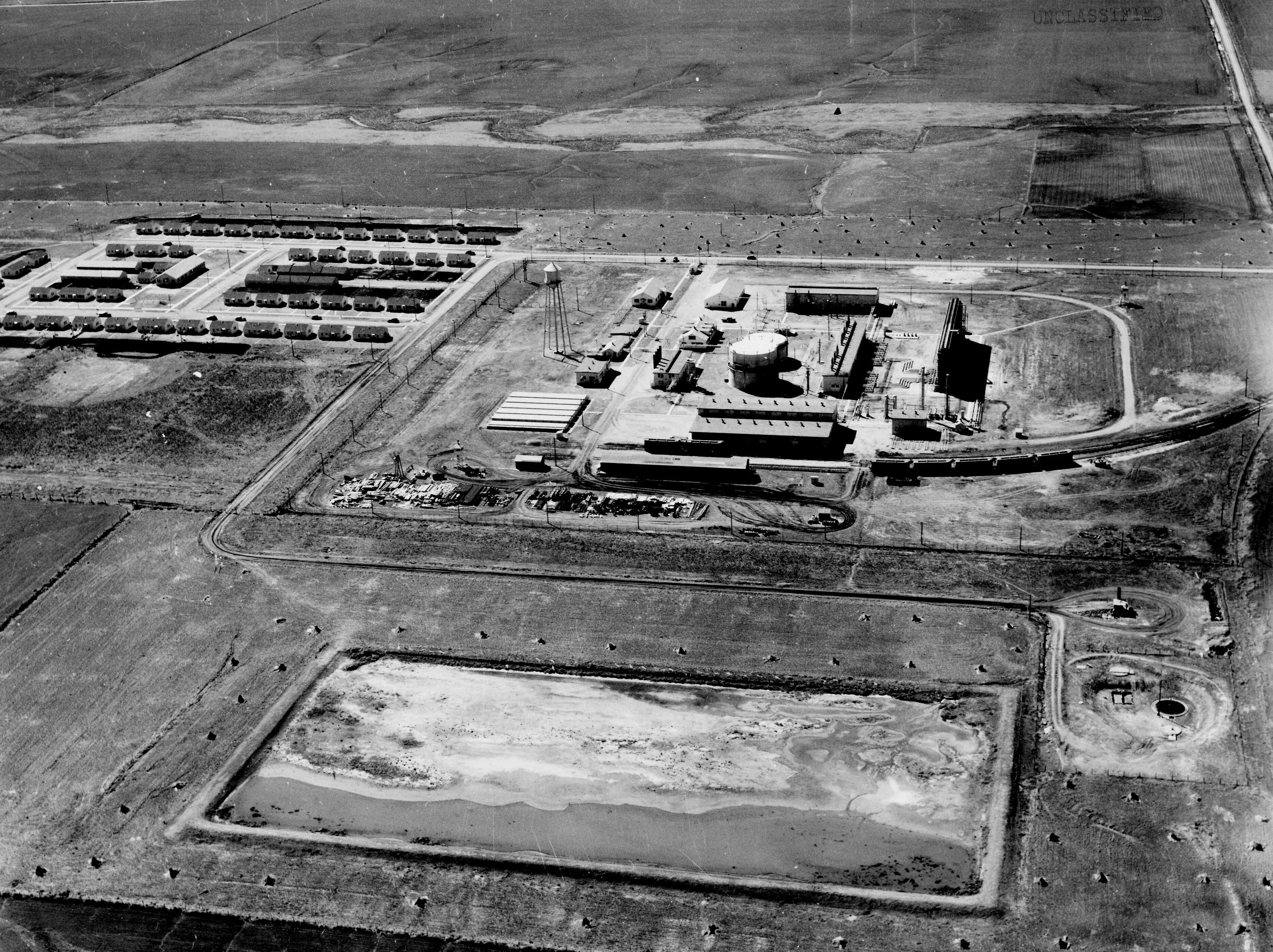
Helium plant in Otis, 1945

Otis was founded in 1886, and named for the founder's son, Otis Modderwell.

The first post office in Otis was established in August 1887.

== Geography ==
According to the United States Census Bureau, the city has a total area of 0.30 square miles (0.78 km^{2}), all land.

== Demographics ==
Historical population
Census	Pop.	Note	%±
1920	505		—
1930	407		−19.4%
1940	413		1.5%
1950	410		−0.7%
1960	362		−11.7%
1970	387		6.9%
1980	410		5.9%
1990	385		−6.1%
2000	325		−15.6%
2010	282		−13.2%
2020	296		5.0%
U.S. Decennial Census

=== 2020 census ===
The 2020 United States census counted 296 people, 118 households, and 66 families in Otis. The population density was 945.7 per square mile (365.1/km^{2}). There were 162 housing units at an average density of 517.6 per square mile (199.8/km^{2}). The racial makeup was 91.22% (270) white or European American (88.85% non-Hispanic white), 0.34% (1) black or African-American, 1.01% (3) Native American or Alaska Native, 0.0% (0) Asian, 0.0% (0) Pacific Islander or Native Hawaiian, 0.68% (2) from other races, and 6.76% (20) from two or more races. Hispanic or Latino of any race was 6.42% (19) of the population.

Of the 118 households, 21.2% had children under the age of 18; 49.2% were married couples living together; 16.9% had a female householder with no spouse or partner present. 35.6% of households consisted of individuals and 19.5% had someone living alone who was 65 years of age or older. The average household size was 2.9 and the average family size was 4.2. The percent of those with a bachelor's degree or higher was estimated to be 6.4% of the population.

21.3% of the population was under the age of 18, 9.1% from 18 to 24, 24.7% from 25 to 44, 24.3% from 45 to 64, and 20.6% who were 65 years of age or older. The median age was 42.0 years. For every 100 females, there were 87.3 males. For every 100 females ages 18 and older, there were 84.9 males.

The 2016–2020 5-year American Community Survey estimates show that the median household income was $38,750 (with a margin of error of +/- $24,369) and the median family income was $55,781 (+/- $11,218). Males had a median income of $30,250 (+/- $18,809) versus $25,972 (+/- $19,542) for females. The median income for those above 16 years old was $26,591 (+/- $13,376). Approximately, 8.2% of families and 10.4% of the population were below the poverty line, including 7.9% of those under the age of 18 and 0.0% of those ages 65 or over.

=== 2010 census ===
As of the census of 2010, there were 282 people, 146 households, and 84 families residing in the city. The population density was 940.0 inhabitants per square mile (362.9/km^{2}). There were 169 housing units at an average density of 563.3 per square mile (217.5/km^{2}). The racial makeup of the city was 96.1% White, 0.4% African American, 0.7% Native American, 0.4% Asian, 0.7% from other races, and 1.8% from two or more races. Hispanic or Latino of any race were 2.5% of the population.

There were 146 households, of which 15.8% had children under the age of 18 living with them, 46.6% were married couples living together, 6.2% had a female householder with no husband present, 4.8% had a male householder with no wife present, and 42.5% were non-families. 40.4% of all households were made up of individuals, and 19.8% had someone living alone who was 65 years of age or older. The average household size was 1.93 and the average family size was 2.56.

The median age in the city was 52.7 years. 16% of residents were under the age of 18; 8.1% were between the ages of 18 and 24; 14.2% were from 25 to 44; 37.2% were from 45 to 64; and 24.5% were 65 years of age or older. The gender makeup of the city was 51.4% male and 48.6% female.

== Industry ==
The Linde Group, based in Munich, Germany, operates the world's second largest helium production facility in Otis, producing nearly one-sixth of the global supply of the gas. The Otis facility supplies helium to the Macy's Thanksgiving Day Parade, sending nearly 400,000 cubic feet (11,000 m^{3}) in 2008 alone.

== Education ==
The community is served by Otis–Bison USD 403 public school district. School unification consolidated Otis and Bison schools forming USD 403. The Otis-Bison High School mascot is Cougars.

Otis schools were closed through school unification. The Otis High School mascot was Eagles.
