= Liebenthal, Kansas =

City in Rush County, Kansas

- City
- Location within Rush County and Kansas

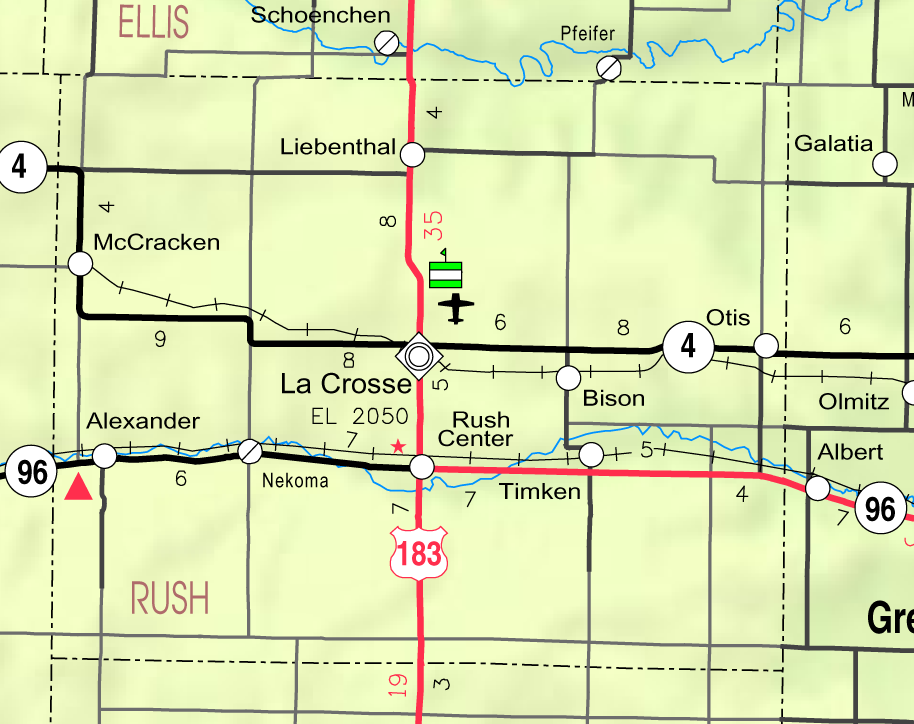
- KDOT map of Rush County (legend)
- Coordinates: 38°39′16″N 99°19′12″W
- Country: United States
- State: Kansas
- County: Rush
- Founded: 1876
- Incorporated: 1935
- Named for: Liebenthal, Russia

Area
  - Total: 0.11 sq mi (0.29 km^{2})
  - Land: 0.11 sq mi (0.29 km^{2})
  - Water: 0 sq mi (0.00 km^{2})
- Elevation: 1,975 ft (602 m)

Population (2020)
  - Total: 92
  - Density: 820/sq mi (320/km^{2})
- Time zone: UTC-6 (CST)
  - Summer (DST): UTC-5 (CDT)
- ZIP Code: 67553
- Area code: 785
- FIPS code: 20-40400
- GNIS ID: 2395705
- Website: cityofliebenthal.net

Liebenthal is a city in Rush County, Kansas, United States. As of the 2020 census, the population of the city was 92. It is located 8 miles north of La Crosse.

== History ==
Liebenthal was founded in 1876 by a colony of Volga Germans, many of whom came from Liebenthal, Russia.

== Geography ==
According to the United States Census Bureau, the city has a total area of 0.13 square miles (0.34 km^{2}), all land.

=== Climate ===
The climate in this area is characterized by hot, humid summers and generally mild to cool winters. According to the Köppen Climate Classification system, Liebenthal has a humid subtropical climate, abbreviated "Cfa" on climate maps.

== Demographics ==
Historical population
Census	Pop.	Note	%±
1940	265		—
1950	211		−20.4%
1960	191		−9.5%
1970	169		−11.5%
1980	163		−3.6%
1990	112		−31.3%
2000	111		−0.9%
2010	103		−7.2%
2020	92		−10.7%
U.S. Decennial Census

=== 2020 census ===
The 2020 United States census counted 92 people, 47 households, and 23 families in Liebenthal. The population density was 821.4 per square mile (317.2/km^{2}). There were 58 housing units at an average density of 517.9 per square mile (199.9/km^{2}). The racial makeup was 88.04% (81) white or European American (85.87% non-Hispanic white), 0.0% (0) black or African-American, 0.0% (0) Native American or Alaska Native, 1.09% (1) Asian, 0.0% (0) Pacific Islander or Native Hawaiian, 0.0% (0) from other races, and 10.87% (10) from two or more races. Hispanic or Latino of any race was 5.43% (5) of the population.

Of the 47 households, 17.0% had children under the age of 18; 29.8% were married couples living together; 29.8% had a female householder with no spouse or partner present. 34.0% of households consisted of individuals and 14.9% had someone living alone who was 65 years of age or older. The average household size was 2.3 and the average family size was 2.7. The percent of those with a bachelor's degree or higher was estimated to be 21.7% of the population.

16.3% of the population was under the age of 18, 6.5% from 18 to 24, 18.5% from 25 to 44, 31.5% from 45 to 64, and 27.2% who were 65 years of age or older. The median age was 50.0 years. For every 100 females, there were 100.0 males. For every 100 females ages 18 and older, there were 113.9 males.

The 2016–2020 5-year American Community Survey estimates show that the median household income was $62,500 (with a margin of error of +/- $10,367) and the median family income was $70,938 (+/- $19,481). Males had a median income of $40,938 (+/- $14,803) versus $32,813 (+/- $15,486) for females. The median income for those above 16 years old was $38,750 (+/- $16,004). Approximately, 10.3% of families and 21.7% of the population were below the poverty line, including 31.0% of those under the age of 18 and 0.0% of those ages 65 or over.

=== 2010 census ===
As of the census of 2010, there were 103 people, 47 households, and 31 families residing in the city. The population density was 792.3 inhabitants per square mile (305.9/km^{2}). There were 60 housing units at an average density of 461.5 per square mile (178.2/km^{2}). The racial makeup of the city was 98.1% White and 1.9% from two or more races.

There were 47 households, of which 19.1% had children under the age of 18 living with them, 51.1% were married couples living together, 10.6% had a female householder with no husband present, 4.3% had a male householder with no wife present, and 34.0% were non-families. 31.9% of all households were made up of individuals, and 12.8% had someone living alone who was 65 years of age or older. The average household size was 2.19 and the average family size was 2.74.

The median age in the city was 47.1 years. 15.5% of residents were under the age of 18; 4.8% were between the ages of 18 and 24; 23.3% were from 25 to 44; 38.9% were from 45 to 64; and 17.5% were 65 years of age or older. The gender makeup of the city was 51.5% male and 48.5% female.

== Education ==
The community is served by La Crosse USD 395 public school district.
