= Rush County, Kansas =

County in Kansas, United States

- County
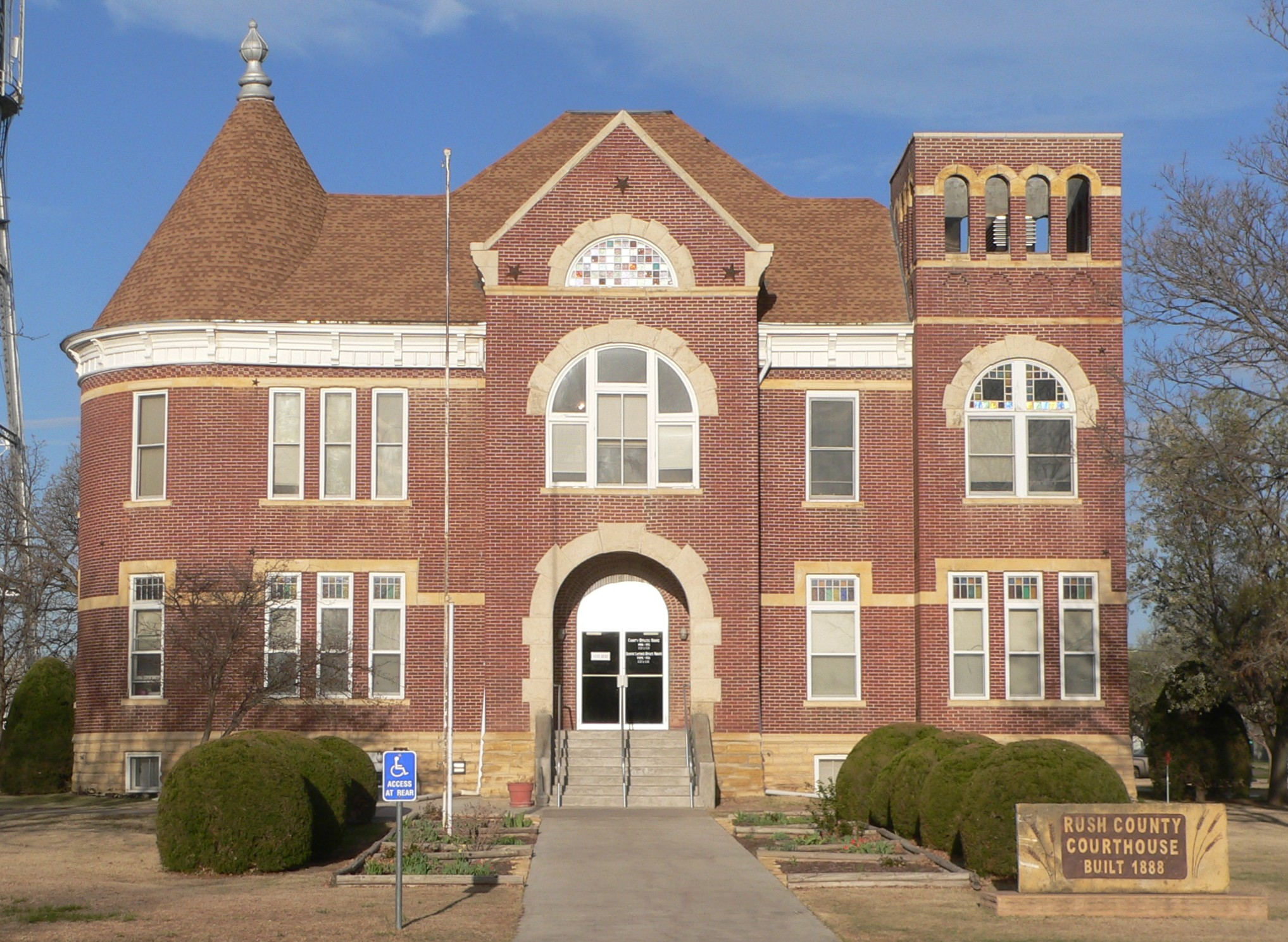
- Rush County Courthouse in La Crosse (2016)

- Location within the U.S. state of Kansas
- Coordinates: 38°31′00″N 99°18′00″W
- Country: United States
- State: Kansas
- Founded: February 26, 1867
- Named for: Alexander Rush
- Seat: La Crosse
- Largest city: La Crosse

Area
  - Total: 718 sq mi (1,860 km^{2})
  - Land: 718 sq mi (1,860 km^{2})
  - Water: 0.2 sq mi (0.52 km^{2}) 0.03%

Population (2020)
  - Total: 2,956
  - Estimate (2025): 2,845 ▼
  - Density: 4.1/sq mi (1.6/km^{2})
- Time zone: UTC−6 (Central)
  - Summer (DST): UTC−5 (CDT)
- Congressional district: 1st
- Website: rushcountykansas.org

Rush County is a county located in the U.S. state of Kansas. Its county seat and largest city is La Crosse. As of the 2020 census, the county population was 2,956. The county was named for Alexander Rush.

== History ==
=== Early history ===
For many millennia, the Great Plains of North America was inhabited by nomadic Native Americans. From the 16th century to 18th century, the Kingdom of France claimed ownership of large parts of North America. In 1762, after the French and Indian War, France secretly ceded New France to Spain, per the Treaty of Fontainebleau.

=== 19th century ===
In 1802, Spain returned most of the land to France but kept title to about 7,500 square miles. In 1803, most of the land for modern day Kansas was acquired by the United States from France as part of the 828,000 square mile Louisiana Purchase for 2.83 cents per acre.

In 1854, the Kansas Territory was organized, then in 1861 Kansas became the 34th U.S. state. In 1867, Rush County was established. Rush County was organized on December 5, 1874. There was a county seat struggle between La Crosse and Rush Center lasting 10 years until La Crosse finally became the county seat.

=== 21st century ===
In 2015, the "Alexander Wind Farm" was constructed south of Alexander. It cost about $85 million and generates 48 megawatts of power.

== Geography ==
According to the U.S. Census Bureau, the county has a total area of 718 square miles (1,860 km^{2}), of which 718 square miles (1,860 km^{2}) is land and 0.2 square miles (0.52 km^{2}) (0.03%) is water.

It is intersected by Walnut Creek, a tributary of the Arkansas River, and watered by other streams.

=== Adjacent counties ===
- Ellis County (north)
- Russell County (northeast)
- Barton County (east)
- Pawnee County (south)
- Ness County (west)

== Demographics ==
Historical population
Census	Pop.	Note	%±
1880	5,490		—
1890	5,204		−5.2%
1900	6,134		17.9%
1910	7,826		27.6%
1920	8,360		6.8%
1930	9,093		8.8%
1940	8,285		−8.9%
1950	7,231		−12.7%
1960	6,160		−14.8%
1970	5,117		−16.9%
1980	4,516		−11.7%
1990	3,842		−14.9%
2000	3,551		−7.6%
2010	3,307		−6.9%
2020	2,956		−10.6%
2025 (est.)	2,845	▼	−3.8%
U.S. Decennial Census; 1790-1960 1900-1990; 1990-2000 2010-2020

=== Racial and ethnic composition ===
Rush County, Kansas – Racial and ethnic composition Note: the US Census treats Hispanic/Latino as an ethnic category. This table excludes Latinos from the racial categories and assigns them to a separate category. Hispanics/Latinos may be of any race.
Race / Ethnicity (NH = Non-Hispanic)	Pop 1980	Pop 1990	Pop 2000	Pop 2010	Pop 2020	% 1980	% 1990	% 2000	% 2010	% 2020
White alone (NH)	4,474	3,796	3,471	3,165	2,745	99.07%	98.80%	97.75%	95.71%	92.86%
Black or African American alone (NH)	2	0	11	8	6	0.04%	0.00%	0.31%	0.24%	0.20%
Native American or Alaska Native alone (NH)	4	5	11	16	3	0.09%	0.13%	0.31%	0.48%	0.10%
Asian alone (NH)	4	5	4	6	14	0.09%	0.13%	0.11%	0.18%	0.47%
Native Hawaiian or Pacific Islander alone (NH)	x	x	0	0	0	x	x	0.00%	0.00%	0.00%
Other race alone (NH)	7	1	0	2	0	0.16%	0.03%	0.00%	0.06%	0.00%
Mixed race or Multiracial (NH)	x	x	17	26	56	x	x	0.48%	0.79%	1.89%
Hispanic or Latino (any race)	25	35	37	84	132	0.55%	0.91%	1.04%	2.54%	4.47%
Total	4,516	3,842	3,551	3,307	2,956	100.00%	100.00%	100.00%	100.00%	100.00%

=== 2020 census ===
As of the 2020 census, the county had a population of 2,956. The median age was 48.1 years. 19.8% of residents were under the age of 18 and 26.6% of residents were 65 years of age or older. For every 100 females there were 104.0 males, and for every 100 females age 18 and over there were 100.1 males age 18 and over.

The racial makeup of the county was 94.7% White, 0.2% Black or African American, 0.1% American Indian and Alaska Native, 0.5% Asian, 0.0% Native Hawaiian and Pacific Islander, 0.6% from some other race, and 3.8% from two or more races. Hispanic or Latino residents of any race comprised 4.5% of the population.

0.0% of residents lived in urban areas, while 100.0% lived in rural areas.

There were 1,322 households in the county, of which 22.2% had children under the age of 18 living with them and 24.0% had a female householder with no spouse or partner present. About 34.5% of all households were made up of individuals and 18.2% had someone living alone who was 65 years of age or older.

There were 1,663 housing units, of which 20.5% were vacant. Among occupied housing units, 80.4% were owner-occupied and 19.6% were renter-occupied. The homeowner vacancy rate was 1.7% and the rental vacancy rate was 18.3%.

=== 2000 census ===
As of the census of 2000, there were 3,551 people, 1,548 households, and 1,013 families residing in the county. The population density was 5 people per square mile (1.9 people/km^{2}). There were 1,928 housing units at an average density of 3 per square mile (1.2/km^{2}). The racial makeup of the county was 98.45% White, 0.31% Black or African American, 0.42% Native American, 0.11% Asian, 0.17% from other races, and 0.54% from two or more races. 1.04% of the population were Hispanic or Latino of any race.

There were 1,548 households, out of which 26.60% had children under the age of 18 living with them, 56.10% were married couples living together, 5.80% had a female householder with no husband present, and 34.50% were non-families. 31.70% of all households were made up of individuals, and 18.00% had someone living alone who was 65 years of age or older. The average household size was 2.24 and the average family size was 2.80.

In the county, the population was spread out, with 22.10% under the age of 18, 5.50% from 18 to 24, 22.90% from 25 to 44, 24.20% from 45 to 64, and 25.30% who were 65 years of age or older. The median age was 45 years. For every 100 females there were 94.40 males. For every 100 females age 18 and over, there were 90.60 males.

The median income for a household in the county was $31,268, and the median income for a family was $38,821. Males had a median income of $25,408 versus $20,307 for females. The per capita income for the county was $18,033. About 6.70% of families and 9.70% of the population were below the poverty line, including 12.50% of those under age 18 and 9.90% of those age 65 or over.

== Government ==
=== Presidential elections ===
Presidential election results

United States presidential election results for Rush County, Kansas
Year	Republican		Democratic		Third party(ies)	
Year	No.	%	No.	%	No.	%
1888	681	58.71%	424	36.55%	55	4.74%
1892	570	47.50%	0	0.00%	630	52.50%
1896	515	44.09%	643	55.05%	10	0.86%
1900	681	48.47%	717	51.03%	7	0.50%
1904	883	58.21%	570	37.57%	64	4.22%
1908	764	45.02%	894	52.68%	39	2.30%
1912	210	11.47%	870	47.52%	751	41.02%
1916	1,223	41.66%	1,478	50.34%	235	8.00%
1920	2,017	73.43%	605	22.02%	125	4.55%
1924	1,780	57.25%	787	25.31%	542	17.43%
1928	1,985	60.02%	1,296	39.19%	26	0.79%
1932	1,433	37.97%	2,275	60.28%	66	1.75%
1936	1,733	41.08%	2,482	58.83%	4	0.09%
1940	2,394	59.84%	1,588	39.69%	19	0.47%
1944	2,193	66.80%	1,076	32.77%	14	0.43%
1948	1,840	56.41%	1,360	41.69%	62	1.90%
1952	2,650	75.50%	843	24.02%	17	0.48%
1956	2,007	64.87%	1,080	34.91%	7	0.23%
1960	1,668	53.86%	1,418	45.79%	11	0.36%
1964	1,098	37.85%	1,778	61.29%	25	0.86%
1968	1,471	57.46%	864	33.75%	225	8.79%
1972	1,639	65.25%	806	32.09%	67	2.67%
1976	1,170	45.33%	1,359	52.65%	52	2.01%
1980	1,840	71.54%	557	21.66%	175	6.80%
1984	1,758	69.49%	718	28.38%	54	2.13%
1988	1,045	48.54%	1,020	47.38%	88	4.09%
1992	756	35.74%	689	32.58%	670	31.68%
1996	1,239	62.29%	547	27.50%	203	10.21%
2000	1,235	66.61%	505	27.24%	114	6.15%
2004	1,226	68.53%	517	28.90%	46	2.57%
2008	1,225	68.78%	504	28.30%	52	2.92%
2012	1,166	74.27%	367	23.38%	37	2.36%
2016	1,197	79.64%	233	15.50%	73	4.86%
2020	1,350	80.50%	295	17.59%	32	1.91%
2024	1,315	81.88%	264	16.44%	27	1.68%

Rush County is presently overwhelmingly Republican, although as recently as 1988 Michael Dukakis, aided by a major Great Plains drought, came within 25 votes of carrying the county for the Democrats.

=== Laws ===
Rush County was a prohibition, or "dry," county until the Kansas Constitution was amended in 1986 and voters approved the sale of alcoholic liquor by the individual drink with a 30 percent food sales requirement.

== Education ==
=== Unified school districts ===
- La Crosse USD 395
- Otis-Bison USD 403

== Communities ==
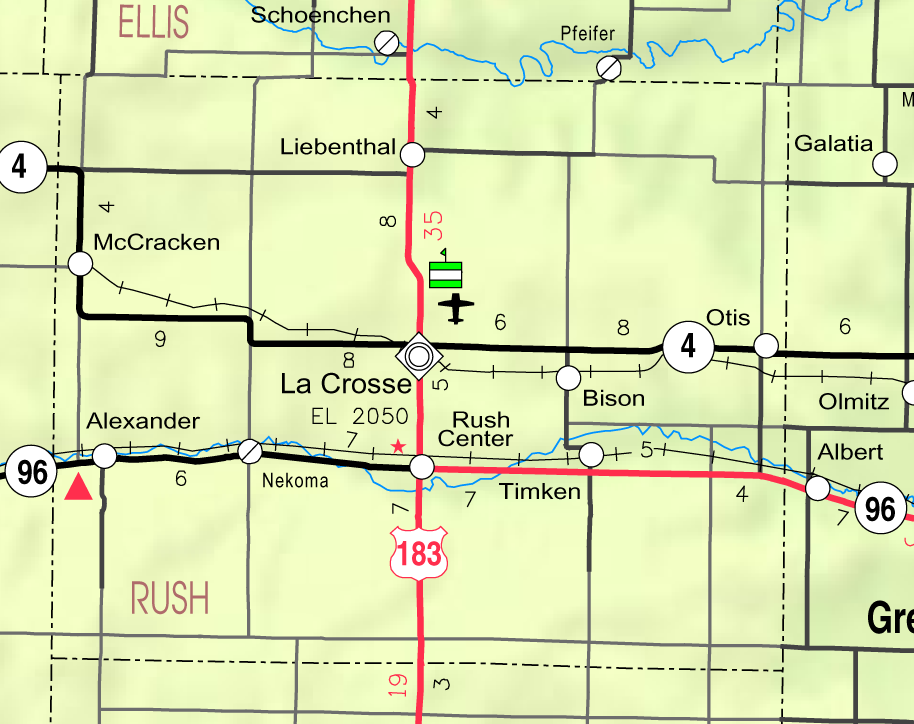
2005 map of Rush County (map legend)

List of townships / incorporated cities / unincorporated communities / extinct former communities within Rush County.

=== Cities ===
- Alexander
- Bison
- La Crosse (county seat)
- Liebenthal
- McCracken
- Otis
- Rush Center
- Timken

=== Unincorporated communities ===
- Hargrave
- Loretto
- Nekoma
- Schaffer

=== Ghost towns ===
- Belfield
- Brookdale
- Fenton
- Flavius
- Hampton
- Hutton
- Lippard
- Olney
- Pioneer
- Ryan
- Saunders
- West Point

=== Townships ===
Rush County is divided into twelve townships. None of the cities within the county are considered governmentally independent, and all figures for the townships include those of the cities. In the following table, the population center is the largest city (or cities) included in that township's population total, if it is of a significant size.

Sources: 2000 U.S. Gazetteer from the U.S. Census Bureau.
Township	FIPS	Population center	Population	Population density /km^{2} (/sq mi)	Land area km^{2} (sq mi)	Water area km^{2} (sq mi)	Water %	Geographic coordinates
Alexander-Belle Prairie	01087		139	1 (2)	220 (85)	0 (0)	0.02%	38°27′23″N 99°31′49″W
Banner	04075		191	1 (4)	139 (54)	0 (0)	0.01%	38°25′53″N 99°11′28″W
Big Timber	06775		164	1 (3)	122 (47)	0 (0)	0.03%	38°39′1″N 99°18′54″W
Center	12125		256	2 (5)	139 (54)	0 (0)	0%	38°26′6″N 99°18′13″W
Garfield	25800		132	1 (2)	139 (54)	0 (0)	0.01%	38°25′15″N 99°4′45″W
Hampton-Fairview	29812		304	1 (3)	276 (107)	0 (0)	0.11%	38°37′32″N 99°30′12″W
Illinois	33750		47	0 (1)	125 (48)	0 (0)	0.01%	38°38′48″N 99°11′28″W
La Crosse-Brookdale	37525		1,475	7 (17)	218 (84)	0 (0)	0.01%	38°32′2″N 99°20′15″W
Lone Star	42500		319	3 (8)	110 (42)	0 (0)	0%	38°31′21″N 99°11′46″W
Pioneer	55950		426	4 (10)	108 (42)	0 (0)	0.01%	38°32′13″N 99°4′4″W
Pleasantdale	56325		33	0 (1)	124 (48)	0 (0)	0.07%	38°38′20″N 99°5′17″W
Union	72350		65	0 (1)	141 (54)	0 (0)	0.01%	38°26′4″N 99°25′47″W

=== Former townships ===
- West Point, Kansas

== See also ==
Community information for Kansas

- Kansas locations by per capita income
- List of counties in Kansas
- List of townships in Kansas
- List of cities in Kansas
- List of unincorporated communities in Kansas
- List of ghost towns in Kansas
