= McCracken, Kansas =

City in Rush County, Kansas

- City
- Location within Rush County and Kansas

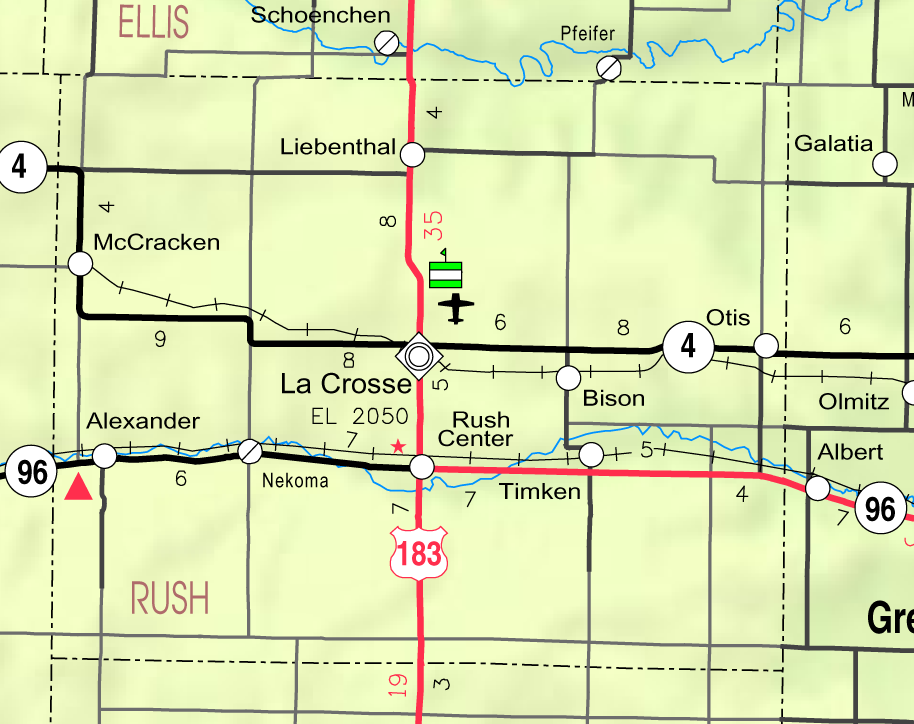
- KDOT map of Rush County (legend)
- Coordinates: 38°34′56″N 99°34′06″W
- Country: United States
- State: Kansas
- County: Rush
- Founded: 1886
- Incorporated: 1887
- Named for: J.K. McCracken

Area
  - Total: 1.00 sq mi (2.58 km^{2})
  - Land: 1.00 sq mi (2.58 km^{2})
  - Water: 0 sq mi (0.00 km^{2})
- Elevation: 2,139 ft (652 m)

Population (2020)
  - Total: 152
  - Density: 153/sq mi (58.9/km^{2})
- Time zone: UTC-6 (CST)
  - Summer (DST): UTC-5 (CDT)
- ZIP Code: 67556
- Area code: 785
- FIPS code: 20-43700
- GNIS ID: 2395062
- Website: cityofmccracken.com

McCracken is a city in Rush County, Kansas, United States. As of the 2020 census, the population of the city was 152.

== History ==
McCracken was founded in 1886 when the railroad was extended to that point. It was named for J.K. McCracken, a railroad employee.

== Geography ==
According to the United States Census Bureau, the city has a total area of 0.95 square miles (2.46 km^{2}), all land.

=== Climate ===
The climate in this area is characterized by hot, humid summers and generally mild to cool winters. According to the Köppen Climate Classification system, McCracken has a humid subtropical climate, abbreviated "Cfa" on climate maps.

== Demographics ==
Historical population
Census	Pop.	Note	%±
1890	281		—
1900	312		11.0%
1910	371		18.9%
1920	491		32.3%
1930	594		21.0%
1940	534		−10.1%
1950	553		3.6%
1960	406		−26.6%
1970	333		−18.0%
1980	292		−12.3%
1990	231		−20.9%
2000	211		−8.7%
2010	190		−10.0%
2020	152		−20.0%
U.S. Decennial Census

=== 2020 census ===
The 2020 United States census counted 152 people, 85 households, and 38 families in McCracken. The population density was 152.5 per square mile (58.9/km^{2}). There were 125 housing units at an average density of 125.4 per square mile (48.4/km^{2}). The racial makeup was 96.71% (147) white or European American (95.39% non-Hispanic white), 0.0% (0) black or African-American, 0.0% (0) Native American or Alaska Native, 0.0% (0) Asian, 0.0% (0) Pacific Islander or Native Hawaiian, 1.32% (2) from other races, and 1.97% (3) from two or more races. Hispanic or Latino of any race was 4.61% (7) of the population.

Of the 85 households, 10.6% had children under the age of 18; 35.3% were married couples living together; 25.9% had a female householder with no spouse or partner present. 48.2% of households consisted of individuals and 21.2% had someone living alone who was 65 years of age or older. The average household size was 1.9 and the average family size was 2.7. The percent of those with a bachelor's degree or higher was estimated to be 8.6% of the population.

14.5% of the population was under the age of 18, 5.3% from 18 to 24, 19.7% from 25 to 44, 31.6% from 45 to 64, and 28.9% who were 65 years of age or older. The median age was 49.0 years. For every 100 females, there were 97.4 males. For every 100 females ages 18 and older, there were 94.0 males.

The 2016–2020 5-year American Community Survey estimates show that the median household income was $38,571 (with a margin of error of +/- $6,641) and the median family income was $40,000 (+/- $19,820). Males had a median income of $21,563 (+/- $18,268) versus $20,357 (+/- $6,847) for females. The median income for those above 16 years old was $20,795 (+/- $5,800). Approximately, 0.0% of families and 1.9% of the population were below the poverty line, including 0.0% of those under the age of 18 and 0.0% of those ages 65 or over.

=== 2010 census ===
As of the census of 2010, there were 190 people, 96 households, and 50 families residing in the city. The population density was 200.0 inhabitants per square mile (77.2/km^{2}). There were 130 housing units at an average density of 136.8 per square mile (52.8/km^{2}). The racial makeup of the city was 93.7% White, 0.5% African American, 2.1% Native American, and 3.7% from two or more races.

There were 96 households, of which 16.7% had children under the age of 18 living with them, 42.7% were married couples living together, 6.3% had a female householder with no husband present, 3.1% had a male householder with no wife present, and 47.9% were non-families. 43.8% of all households were made up of individuals, and 23.9% had someone living alone who was 65 years of age or older. The average household size was 1.98 and the average family size was 2.76.

The median age in the city was 53 years. 19.5% of residents were under the age of 18; 4.7% were between the ages of 18 and 24; 15.4% were from 25 to 44; 31.6% were from 45 to 64; and 28.9% were 65 years of age or older. The gender makeup of the city was 48.9% male and 51.1% female.

== Education ==
The community is served by La Crosse USD 395 public school district. The LaCrosse High School mascot is LaCrosse Leopards.

McCracken High School was closed through school unification. The McCracken Mustangs won the Kansas State High School boys class 1A basketball championship in 1972.

== Media ==
Part of the 1973 film Paper Moon was shot in the McCracken area. All of the major building "filming locations", including the hotel and cafe, are gone, and today are empty lots.
