= Rush Center, Kansas =

City in Rush County, Kansas

- City
- Location within Rush County and Kansas

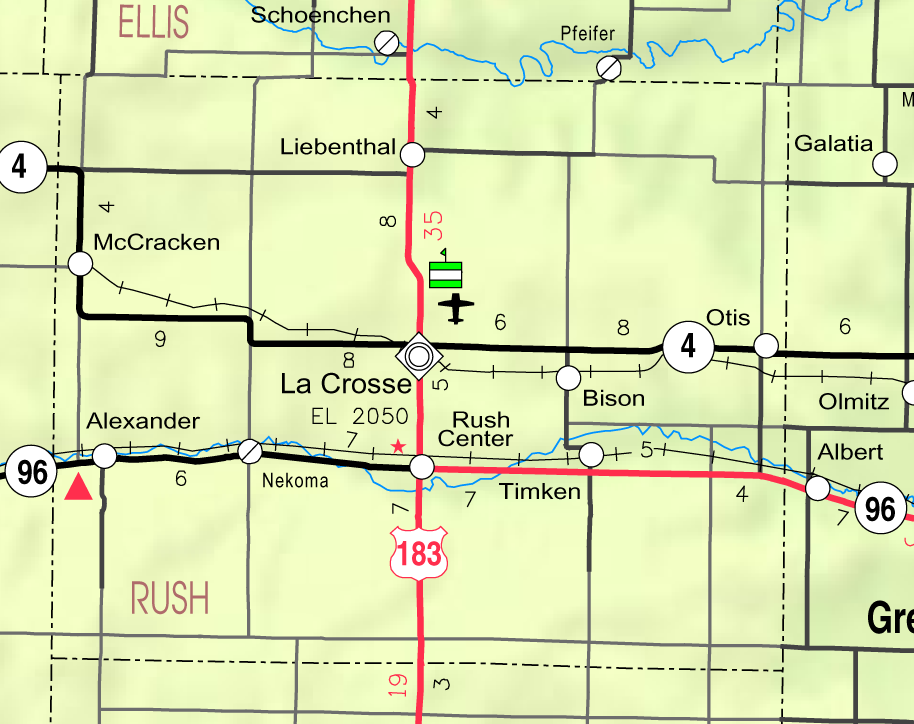
- KDOT map of Rush County (legend)
- Coordinates: 38°27′54″N 99°18′39″W
- Country: United States
- State: Kansas
- County: Rush
- Founded: 1870s
- Platted: 1871
- Incorporated: 1959

Area
  - Total: 0.36 sq mi (0.93 km^{2})
  - Land: 0.36 sq mi (0.93 km^{2})
  - Water: 0 sq mi (0.00 km^{2})
- Elevation: 1,992 ft (607 m)

Population (2020)
  - Total: 141
  - Density: 390/sq mi (150/km^{2})
- Time zone: UTC-6 (CST)
  - Summer (DST): UTC-5 (CDT)
- ZIP Code: 67575
- Area code: 785
- FIPS code: 20-61775
- GNIS ID: 2396448
- Website: City website

Rush Center is a city in Rush County, Kansas, United States. As of the 2020 census, the population of the city was 141.

== History ==
Rush Center was originally called Walnut City, and under the latter name was laid out in 1871. It was renamed in 1874. By 1886, Rush Center had a population of about 1,000.

== Geography ==
According to the United States Census Bureau, the city has a total area of 0.39 square miles (1.01 km^{2}), all land.

== Demographics ==
Historical population
Census	Pop.	Note	%±
1890	214		—
1960	278		—
1970	237		−14.7%
1980	207		−12.7%
1990	177		−14.5%
2000	176		−0.6%
2010	170		−3.4%
2020	141		−17.1%
U.S. Decennial Census

=== 2010 census ===
As of the census of 2010, there were 170 people, 83 households, and 50 families residing in the city. The population density was 435.9 inhabitants per square mile (168.3/km^{2}). There were 100 housing units at an average density of 256.4 per square mile (99.0/km^{2}). The racial makeup of the city was 95.9% White, 0.6% African American, 1.2% Native American, 0.6% Asian, and 1.8% from two or more races. Hispanic or Latino of any race were 2.4% of the population.

There were 83 households, of which 16.9% had children under the age of 18 living with them, 53.0% were married couples living together, 6.0% had a female householder with no husband present, 1.2% had a male householder with no wife present, and 39.8% were non-families. 33.7% of all households were made up of individuals, and 21.7% had someone living alone who was 65 years of age or older. The average household size was 2.05 and the average family size was 2.58.

The median age in the city was 52 years. 14.7% of residents were under the age of 18; 5.3% were between the ages of 18 and 24; 20.6% were from 25 to 44; 28.2% were from 45 to 64; and 31.2% were 65 years of age or older. The gender makeup of the city was 48.2% male and 51.8% female.

=== 2000 census ===
As of the census of 2000, there were 176 people, 83 households, and 52 families residing in the city. The population density was 455.5 inhabitants per square mile (175.9/km^{2}). There were 99 housing units at an average density of 256.2 per square mile (98.9/km^{2}). The racial makeup of the city was 98.86% White, 0.57% Native American, and 0.57% from two or more races.

There were 83 households, out of which 25.3% had children under the age of 18 living with them, 55.4% were married couples living together, 4.8% had a female householder with no husband present, and 37.3% were non-families. 36.1% of all households were made up of individuals, and 25.3% had someone living alone who was 65 years of age or older. The average household size was 2.12 and the average family size was 2.77.

In the city, the population was spread out, with 21.6% under the age of 18, 2.3% from 18 to 24, 26.1% from 25 to 44, 23.3% from 45 to 64, and 26.7% who were 65 years of age or older. The median age was 45 years. For every 100 females, there were 87.2 males. For every 100 females age 18 and over, there were 86.5 males.

The median income for a household in the city was $31,500, and the median income for a family was $34,861. Males had a median income of $23,125 versus $19,375 for females. The per capita income for the city was $16,006. None of the families and 5.6% of the population were living below the poverty line, including no under eighteens and 13.2% of those over 64.

== Education ==
The community is served by La Crosse USD 395 public school district.

== Notable people ==
- Henry White Edgerton (1888 –1970), United States Circuit Judge, was born in Rush Center.
