= La Crosse, Kansas =

City in Rush County, Kansas

- City and County seat
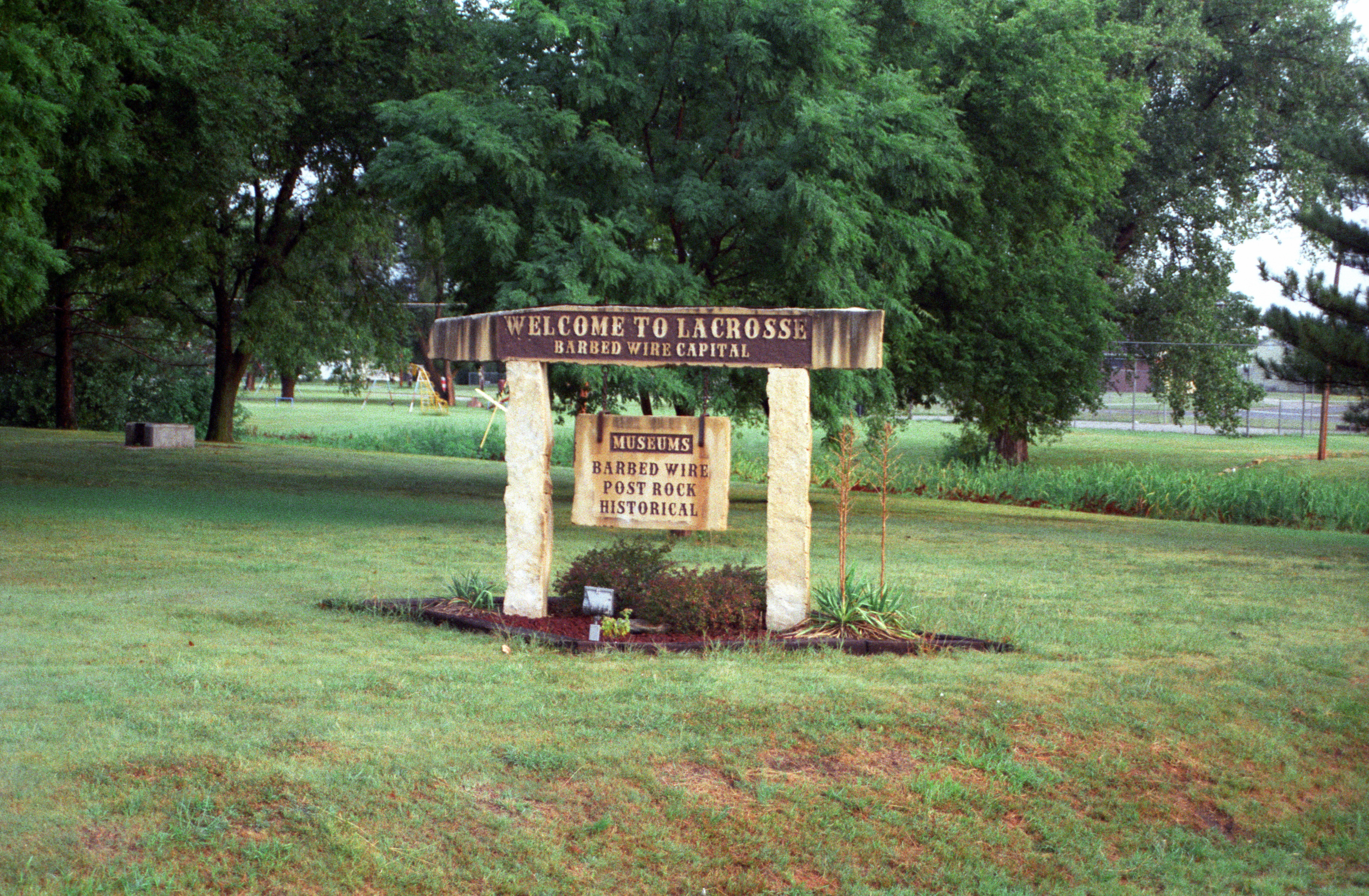
- Welcome Sign (2010)

- Location within Rush County and Kansas

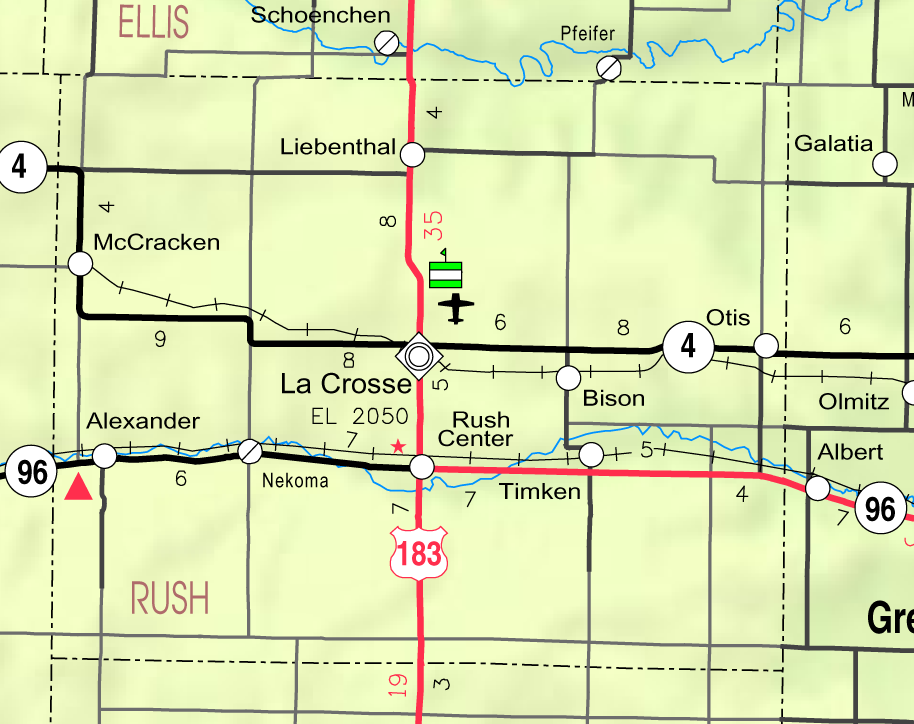
- KDOT map of Rush County (legend)
- Coordinates: 38°31′55″N 99°18′34″W
- Country: United States
- State: Kansas
- County: Rush
- Founded: 1876
- Incorporated: 1886
- Named for: La Crosse, Wisconsin

Area
  - Total: 1.03 sq mi (2.68 km^{2})
  - Land: 1.03 sq mi (2.68 km^{2})
  - Water: 0 sq mi (0.00 km^{2})
- Elevation: 2,057 ft (627 m)

Population (2020)
  - Total: 1,266
  - Density: 1,220/sq mi (472/km^{2})
- Time zone: UTC-6 (CST)
  - Summer (DST): UTC-5 (CDT)
- ZIP Codes: 67548, 67553
- Area code: 785
- FIPS code: 20-37500
- GNIS ID: 2395563
- Website: cityoflacrosseks.com

La Crosse is a city in and the county seat of Rush County, Kansas, United States. As of the 2020 census, the population of the city was 1,266. La Crosse proclaims itself the "Barbed Wire capital of the world.

== History ==
La Crosse was founded in 1876, was named after the city of La Crosse, Wisconsin. La Crosse subsequently became the intended county seat, and county records were transferred there from the temporary county seat, nearby Rush Center. A county seat war ensued between the two communities, lasting until La Crosse was declared the permanent county seat and the construction of the county courthouse in 1888.

In the 1960s, La Crosse became a regional center of barbed wire collecting, leading to the establishment of the Kansas Barbed Wire Museum and the nicknaming of the city as "The Barbed Wire Capital of the World".

=== Tornado of 2012 ===
On May 25, 2012, an EF-1 tornado caused about four blocks of significant damage, and two businesses were destroyed. A third of the businesses sustained major damage. No injuries were reported.

== Geography ==
La Crosse lies in the Smoky Hills region of the Great Plains, approximately 12 miles (19 km) south of the Smoky Hill River and 5 miles (8.0 km) north of Walnut Creek, a tributary of the Arkansas River. Sand Creek, a tributary of Walnut Creek, flows southeastward around the southwestern and southern portions of the city. Mule Creek, a small tributary of Sand Creek, flows southeastward through the city. Located in west-central Kansas at the intersection of U.S. Route 183 and K-4, La Crosse is 125 miles (201 km) northwest of Wichita, 261 miles (420 km) west-southwest of Kansas City, and 314 miles (505 km) east-southeast of Denver.

According to the United States Census Bureau, the city has a total area of 1.05 square miles (2.72 km^{2}), all land.

=== Climate ===
On average in La Crosse, July is the hottest month, January is the coldest and driest month, and May the wettest month. The hottest temperature recorded in La Crosse was 115 °F (46 °C) in 1954; the coldest temperature recorded was -24 °F (-31 °C) in 1989.

Climate data for La Crosse, Kansas
Month	Jan	Feb	Mar	Apr	May	Jun	Jul	Aug	Sep	Oct	Nov	Dec	Year
Record high °F (°C)	81 (27)	86 (30)	95 (35)	103 (39)	107 (42)	112 (44)	115 (46)	114 (46)	112 (44)	100 (38)	89 (32)	83 (28)	115 (46)
Mean daily maximum °F (°C)	41 (5)	47 (8)	57 (14)	67 (19)	76 (24)	87 (31)	94 (34)	92 (33)	83 (28)	72 (22)	55 (13)	44 (7)	68 (20)
Mean daily minimum °F (°C)	15 (−9)	19 (−7)	28 (−2)	38 (3)	50 (10)	60 (16)	65 (18)	63 (17)	54 (12)	41 (5)	27 (−3)	19 (−7)	40 (4)
Record low °F (°C)	−23 (−31)	−17 (−27)	−23 (−31)	9 (−13)	21 (−6)	36 (2)	43 (6)	42 (6)	23 (−5)	14 (−10)	−8 (−22)	−24 (−31)	−24 (−31)
Average precipitation inches (mm)	0.66 (17)	0.83 (21)	2.09 (53)	2.27 (58)	3.65 (93)	3.35 (85)	3.40 (86)	2.55 (65)	1.88 (48)	1.42 (36)	1.22 (31)	0.76 (19)	24.08 (612)
Source: The Weather Channel

== Demographics ==
Historical population
Census	Pop.	Note	%±
1890	513		—
1900	536		4.5%
1910	806		50.4%
1920	808		0.2%
1930	1,355		67.7%
1940	1,407		3.8%
1950	1,769		25.7%
1960	1,767		−0.1%
1970	1,583		−10.4%
1980	1,618		2.2%
1990	1,427		−11.8%
2000	1,376		−3.6%
2010	1,342		−2.5%
2020	1,266		−5.7%
U.S. Decennial Census

=== 2020 census ===
The 2020 United States census counted 1,266 people, 547 households, and 318 families in La Crosse. The population density was 1,222.0 per square mile (471.8/km^{2}). There were 642 housing units at an average density of 619.7 per square mile (239.3/km^{2}). The racial makeup was 94.79% (1,200) white or European American (92.65% non-Hispanic white), 0.32% (4) black or African-American, 0.08% (1) Native American or Alaska Native, 0.32% (4) Asian, 0.0% (0) Pacific Islander or Native Hawaiian, 0.71% (9) from other races, and 3.79% (48) from two or more races. Hispanic or Latino of any race was 4.66% (59) of the population.

Of the 547 households, 25.6% had children under the age of 18; 45.9% were married couples living together; 28.3% had a female householder with no spouse or partner present. 34.2% of households consisted of individuals and 18.3% had someone living alone who was 65 years of age or older. The average household size was 2.0 and the average family size was 3.0. The percent of those with a bachelor's degree or higher was estimated to be 19.0% of the population.

22.1% of the population was under the age of 18, 4.9% from 18 to 24, 21.7% from 25 to 44, 26.0% from 45 to 64, and 25.3% who were 65 years of age or older. The median age was 45.6 years. For every 100 females, there were 104.9 males. For every 100 females ages 18 and older, there were 113.0 males.

The 2016–2020 5-year American Community Survey estimates show that the median household income was $40,069 (with a margin of error of +/- $8,803) and the median family income was $66,750 (+/- $12,066). Males had a median income of $32,692 (+/- $11,813) versus $19,567 (+/- $3,871) for females. The median income for those above 16 years old was $21,816 (+/- $2,726). Approximately, 2.6% of families and 5.4% of the population were below the poverty line, including 2.1% of those under the age of 18 and 3.4% of those ages 65 or over.

=== 2010 census ===
As of the census of 2010, there were 1,342 people, 606 households, and 350 families residing in the city. The population density was 1,278.1 inhabitants per square mile (493.5/km^{2}). There were 722 housing units at an average density of 687.6 per square mile (265.5/km^{2}). The racial makeup of the city was 98.5% White, 0.2% African American, 0.4% Native American, 0.2% Asian, and 0.7% from two or more races. Hispanic or Latino of any race were 2.8% of the population.

There were 606 households, of which 24.9% had children under the age of 18 living with them, 44.2% were married couples living together, 8.7% had a female householder with no husband present, 4.8% had a male householder with no wife present, and 42.2% were non-families. 36.6% of all households were made up of individuals, and 18.5% had someone living alone who was 65 years of age or older. The average household size was 2.10 and the average family size was 2.72.

The median age in the city was 47.7 years. 19.9% of residents were under the age of 18; 4.9% were between the ages of 18 and 24; 21.3% were from 25 to 44; 27% were from 45 to 64; and 26.9% were 65 years of age or older. The gender makeup of the city was 47.3% male and 52.7% female.

== Government ==
La Crosse is a city of the third class, according to state statute, with a commission-manager form of government. The city commission consists of the mayor and two commissioners, and it meets on the second and fourth Wednesday of each month.

== Education ==
The community is served by La Crosse USD 395 public school district, and operates three schools in the city:

- La Crosse High School (9-12)
- La Crosse Middle School (7-8)
- La Crosse Elementary School (K-6)

== Transportation ==
U.S. Route 183 runs north-south through La Crosse, intersecting Kansas Highway 4 (K-4) which runs east-west along the northern edge of the city.

Rush County Airport is located northeast of the city on the north side of K-4. Publicly owned, it has one asphalt runway and is used for general aviation.

A line of the Kansas and Oklahoma Railroad runs southeast-northwest through La Crosse.

== Media ==
=== Print ===
One newspaper, The Rush County News, is published weekly in La Crosse.

=== Radio ===
The following radio stations are licensed to and/or broadcast from La Crosse:

FM

Frequency	Callsign	Format	City of License	Notes
93.5	KKDT	Adult Hits	Burdett, Kansas	"Dave FM"; Broadcasts from La Crosse
104.7	KXNC	Top 40	Ness City, Kansas	Broadcasts from La Crosse

=== Television ===
La Crosse is in the Wichita-Hutchinson, Kansas television market.

== Culture ==
=== Events ===
- Rush County Fair

=== Points of interest ===
- Kansas Barbed Wire Museum
- Post Rock Museum
- Historical Museum
- Nekoma Bank Museum
- Pleasant Point One-Room School Museum

== See also ==
- List of United States tornadoes in May 2012
