= Belmont Township, Kansas =

Belmont Township, Kansas may refer to the following places:

- Belmont Township, Kingman County, Kansas
- Belmont Township, Phillips County, Kansas

== See also ==
- List of Kansas townships
- Belmont Township (disambiguation)
