= Kirwin Township, Kansas =

Township in Phillips County, Kansas, U.S.

Kirwin Township
- Township
- Location within Phillips County
- Coordinates: 39.695709°N 99.126191°W
- Country: United States
- State: Kansas
- County: Phillips

Government
  - Commissioner District #1: Doug Zillinger

Area
  - Total: 35.925 sq mi (93.05 km^{2})
  - Land: 33.44 sq mi (86.6 km^{2})
  - Water: 2.485 sq mi (6.44 km^{2}) 6.92%
- Elevation: 1,755 ft (535 m)

Population (2020)
  - Total: 179
  - Density: 5.35/sq mi (2.07/km^{2})
- Time zone: UTC-6 (CST)
  - Summer (DST): UTC-5 (CDT)
- Area code: 785
- GNIS feature ID: 472047

Kirwin Township is a township in Phillips County, Kansas, United States. As of the 2020 census, its population was 179.

== Geography ==
Kirwin Township covers an area of 35.925 square miles (93.05 square kilometers). Most of Kirwin National Wildlife Refuge and Kirwin Reservoir are located within the township.

=== Communities ===
- Kirwin

=== Adjacent townships ===
Plum Township, Phillips County
Arcade Township, Phillips County	northwest	north	northeast	Cedar Township, Smith County
Deer Creek Township, Phillips County	west	self	east	Valley Township, Smith County
Bow Creek Township, Phillips County	southwest	south	southeast	Dor Township, Smith County
Valley Township, Phillips County

== Transportation ==
=== Major highways ===
- K-9
