= Granite Township, Kansas =

Township in Phillips County, Kansas, U.S.

Granite Township
- Township
- Location within Phillips County
- Coordinates: 39.951547°N 99.449879°W
- Country: United States
- State: Kansas
- County: Phillips

Government
  - Commissioner District #3: Jerry Gruwell

Area
  - Total: 35.627 sq mi (92.27 km^{2})
  - Land: 35.578 sq mi (92.15 km^{2})
  - Water: 0.049 sq mi (0.13 km^{2}) 0.14%
- Elevation: 2,179 ft (664 m)

Population (2020)
  - Total: 28
  - Density: 0.79/sq mi (0.30/km^{2})
- Time zone: UTC-6 (CST)
  - Summer (DST): UTC-5 (CDT)
- Area code: 785
- GNIS feature ID: 471758

Granite Township is a township in Phillips County, Kansas, United States. As of the 2020 census, its population was 28.

== Geography ==
Granite Township covers an area of 35.627 square miles (92.27 square kilometers).

=== Communities ===
- Woodruff

=== Adjacent townships ===
Eldorado Township, Harlan County, Nebraska
Fairfield Township, Harlan County, Nebraska	northwest	north	northeast	Prairie Dog Township, Harlan County, Nebraska
Long Island Township, Phillips County	west	self	east	Walnut Township, Phillips County
Prairie View Township, Phillips County	southwest	south	southeast	Freedom Township, Phillips County
Dayton Township, Phillips County

== Transportation ==
=== Major highways ===
- K-383
