= Fairfield Township, Minnesota =

Fairfield Township is the name of some places in the U.S. state of Minnesota:

- Fairfield Township, Crow Wing County, Minnesota
- Fairfield Township, Swift County, Minnesota

== See also ==
- Fairfield Township (disambiguation)
