= Walnut Township, Phillips County, Kansas =

Township in Phillips County, Kansas, U.S.

Walnut Township
- Township
- Location within Phillips County
- Coordinates: 39.959041°N 99.346331°W
- Country: United States
- State: Kansas
- County: Phillips

Government
  - Commissioner District #3: Jerry Gruwell

Area
  - Total: 35.755 sq mi (92.61 km^{2})
  - Land: 35.722 sq mi (92.52 km^{2})
  - Water: 0.033 sq mi (0.085 km^{2}) 0.09%
- Elevation: 2,113 ft (644 m)

Population (2020)
  - Total: 22
  - Density: 0.62/sq mi (0.24/km^{2})
- Time zone: UTC-6 (CST)
  - Summer (DST): UTC-5 (CDT)
- Area code: 785
- GNIS feature ID: 471760

Walnut Township is a township in Phillips County, Kansas, United States. As of the 2020 census, its population was 22.

== Geography ==
Walnut Township covers an area of 35.755 square miles (92.61 square kilometers).

=== Adjacent townships ===
Prairie Dog Township, Harlan County, Nebraska
Eldorado Township, Harlan County, Nebraska	northwest	north	northeast	Republican City Township, Harlan County, Nebraska
Granite Township, Phillips County	west	self	east	Glenwood Township, Phillips County
Dayton Township, Phillips County	southwest	south	southeast	Greenwood Township, Phillips County
Freedom Township, Phillips County

== Transportation ==
=== Major highways ===
- US-183
- K-383
