= Fairfield Township, Nebraska =

Fairfield Township, Nebraska may refer to the following places:

- Fairfield Township, Clay County, Nebraska
- Fairfield Township, Harlan County, Nebraska

== See also ==
- Fairfield Township (disambiguation)
