= Glenwood Township, Kansas =

Township in Phillips County, Kansas, U.S.

Glenwood Township
- Township
- Location within Phillips County
- Coordinates: 39.96367°N 99.230871°W
- Country: United States
- State: Kansas
- County: Phillips

Government
  - Commissioner District #3: Jerry Gruwell

Area
  - Total: 35.66 sq mi (92.4 km^{2})
  - Land: 35.53 sq mi (92.0 km^{2})
  - Water: 0.13 sq mi (0.34 km^{2}) 0.36%
- Elevation: 2,149 ft (655 m)

Population (2020)
  - Total: 54
  - Density: 1.5/sq mi (0.59/km^{2})
- Time zone: UTC-6 (CST)
  - Summer (DST): UTC-5 (CDT)
- Area code: 785
- GNIS feature ID: 471780

Glenwood Township is a township in Phillips County, Kansas, United States. As of the 2020 census, its population was 54.

== Geography ==
Glenwood Township covers an area of 35.66 square miles (92.4 square kilometers).

=== Adjacent townships ===
Republican City Township, Harlan County, Nebraska
Prairie Dog Township, Harlan County, Nebraska	northwest	north	northeast	Turkey Creek Township, Franklin County, Nebraska
Walnut Township, Phillips County	west	self	east	Sumner Township, Phillips County
Freedom Township, Phillips County	southwest	south	southeast	Crystal Township, Phillips County
Greenwood Township, Phillips County
