= Deer Creek Township, Phillips County, Kansas =

Township in Phillips County, Kansas, U.S.

Deer Creek Township
- Township
- Location within Phillips County
- Coordinates: 39.691259°N 99.225872°W
- Country: United States
- State: Kansas
- County: Phillips

Government
  - Commissioner District #1: Doug Zillinger

Area
  - Total: 35.685 sq mi (92.42 km^{2})
  - Land: 33.948 sq mi (87.92 km^{2})
  - Water: 1.737 sq mi (4.50 km^{2}) 4.87%
- Elevation: 1,844 ft (562 m)

Population (2020)
  - Total: 68
  - Density: 2.0/sq mi (0.77/km^{2})
- Time zone: UTC-6 (CST)
  - Summer (DST): UTC-5 (CDT)
- Area code: 785
- GNIS feature ID: 472034

Deer Creek Township is a township in Phillips County, Kansas, United States. As of the 2020 census, its population was 68.

== Geography ==
Deer Creek Township covers an area of 35.685 square miles (92.42 square kilometers). Parts of Kirwin National Wildlife Refuge and Kirwin Reservoir are located within the township.

=== Adjacent townships ===
Arcade Township, Phillips County
| Phillipsburg Township, Phillips County | northwest | north | northeast | Plum Township, Phillips County |
| Solomon Township, Phillips County | west | self | east | Kirwin Township, Phillips County |
| Rushville Township, Phillips County | southwest | south | southeast | Valley Township, Phillips County |
Bow Creek Township, Phillips County

== Transportation ==
=== Major highways ===
- K-9
