= Bow Creek Township, Kansas =

Township in Phillips County, Kansas, U.S.

Bow Creek Township
- Township
- Location within Phillips County
- Coordinates: 39.603967°N 99.225655°W
- Country: United States
- State: Kansas
- County: Phillips

Government
  - Commissioner District #1: Douglas Zillinger

Area
  - Total: 35.925 sq mi (93.05 km^{2})
  - Land: 35.39 sq mi (91.7 km^{2})
  - Water: 0.535 sq mi (1.39 km^{2}) 1.49%
- Elevation: 1,923 ft (586 m)

Population (2020)
  - Total: 18
  - Density: 0.51/sq mi (0.20/km^{2})
- Time zone: UTC-6 (CST)
  - Summer (DST): UTC-5 (CDT)
- Area code: 785
- GNIS feature ID: 472035

Bow Creek Township is a township in Phillips County, Kansas, United States. As of the 2020 census, its population was 18.

== Geography ==
Bow Creek Township covers an area of 35.925 square miles (93.05 square kilometers). Parts of Kirwin National Wildlife Refuge and Kirwin Reservoir are located within the township.

=== Adjacent townships ===
Deer Creek Township, Phillips County
Solomon Township, Phillips County	northwest	north	northeast	Kirwin Township, Phillips County
Rushville Township, Phillips County	west	self	east	Valley Township, Phillips County
Township 3, Rooks County	southwest	south
Township 2, Rooks County

== Transportation ==
=== Major highways ===
- US-183
