= Almena-District 4 Township, Kansas =

Township in Norton County, Kansas, U.S.

Almena-District 4 Township
- Township
- Location within Norton County
- Coordinates: 39.893983°N 99.71047°W
- Country: United States
- State: Kansas
- County: Norton

Area
  - Total: 143.025 sq mi (370.43 km^{2})
  - Land: 143.019 sq mi (370.42 km^{2})
  - Water: 0.006 sq mi (0.016 km^{2}) 0%

Population (2020)
  - Total: 508
  - Density: 3.55/sq mi (1.37/km^{2})
- Time zone: UTC-6 (CST)
  - Summer (DST): UTC-5 (CDT)
- Area code: 785

Almena-District 4 Township is a township in Norton County, Kansas, United States. As of the 2020 census, its population was 508.

== Geography ==
Almena-District 4 Township covers an area of 143.025 square miles (370.43 square kilometers).

=== Communities ===
- Almena

=== Adjacent townships ===
- Fairfield Township, Harlan County, Nebraska (northeast)
- Long Island Township, Phillips County (east-northeast)
- Prairie View Township, Phillips County (east)
- Beaver Township, Phillips County (east-southeast)
- Logan Township, Phillips County (southeast)
- Solomon-District 3 Township, Norton County (southwest)
- Center-District 1 Township, Norton County (west)

=== Major highways ===
- US-36
- K-60
- K-383
