= Township 3, Rooks County, Kansas =

Township in Rooks County, Kansas, U.S.

Township 3
- Township
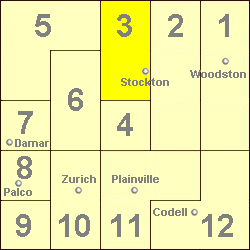
- Location in Rooks County

- Location within state of Kansas
- Coordinates: 39°28′50″N 99°19′23″W
- Country: United States
- State: Kansas
- County: Rooks
- Established: 1971

Area
  - Total: 71.111 sq mi (184.18 km^{2})
  - Land: 71.012 sq mi (183.92 km^{2})
  - Water: 0.099 sq mi (0.26 km^{2}) 0.14%
- Elevation: 1,939 ft (591 m)

Population (2020)
  - Total: 1,360
  - Density: 19.2/sq mi (7.39/km^{2})
- Time zone: UTC-6 (CST)
  - Summer (DST): UTC-5 (CDT)
- Area code: 785
- GNIS feature ID: 472128

Township 3 is a township in Rooks County, Kansas, United States. Stockton is the largest population center in Township 3. As of the 2020 census, its population was 1,360.

== History ==
Rooks County was established with four townships: Bow Creek, Lowell, Paradise and Stockton. That number increased to seven by 1878 and twenty three in 1925. The twenty three townships were in place until 1971 when the number was reduced to the current twelve townships.

Township 3 was formed from Rooks County townships Farmington and Stockton in 1971, pursuant to Kansas Statute 80-1110. That statute allowed for the dissolution of townships, while assigning those territories to contiguous townships.

Bow Creek flows through Township 3, then on to Kirwin Reservoir in Phillips County. Dibble Creek, labeled as Stockton Creek on early maps, flows into South Fork Solomon River.

=== Farmington Township ===
Farmington Township was established in 1878 from parts of Bow Creek and Lowell townships. Farmington was a double township until Lanark Township was created from the eastern half of Farmington Township in 1879.

Farmington Township was named by Elam Bartholomew for Farmington, Illinois. Elam Bartholomew moved to Farmington Township (then part of Bow Creek Township) in 1874. Bartholomew authored two books, The Fungus Flora of Kansas and North American Plant Rusts based on research he conducted while living in Farmington Township. Sternberg Museum's herbarium is named for Elam Bartholomew.

=== Stockton Township ===
Stockton was one of the four original Rooks County civil townships, along with Bow Creek, Lowell and Paradise. The original Stockton Township was 12 miles north-to-south (two survey townships). The eastern border was with Lowell Township, nine miles (1-1/2 survey townships) from the Osborne County line. The western border was the Graham County line, making Stockton 21 miles (3-1/2 survey townships) in width. Stockton Township originally included territory that would become Alcona, Belmont, Hobart, Richland, Rush and the western halves of Greenfield and Iowa townships.

== Geography ==
Township 3 covers an area of 71.111 square miles (184.18 square kilometers).

=== Communities ===
- part of Stockton

=== Adjacent townships ===
Rushville Township, Phillips County
		north	northeast	Bow Creek Township, Phillips County
Township 5, Rooks County	west	self	east	Township 2, Rooks County
Township 6, Rooks County	southwest	south
Township 4, Rooks County

== Transportation ==
=== Major highways ===
- US-24
- US-183
