= Eldorado Township, Nebraska =

Eldorado Township, Nebraska may refer to the following places in Nebraska:

- Eldorado Township, Clay County, Nebraska
- Eldorado Township, Harlan County, Nebraska

== See also ==
- Eldorado Township (disambiguation)
