= Valley Township, Phillips County, Kansas =

Township in Phillips County, Kansas, U.S.

Valley Township
- Township
- Location within Phillips County
- Coordinates: 39.611966°N 99.1202°W
- Country: United States
- State: Kansas
- County: Phillips

Government
  - Commissioner District #1: Doug Zillinger

Area
  - Total: 35.869 sq mi (92.90 km^{2})
  - Land: 32.743 sq mi (84.80 km^{2})
  - Water: 3.126 sq mi (8.10 km^{2}) 8.72%
- Elevation: 1,850 ft (560 m)

Population (2020)
  - Total: 24
  - Density: 0.73/sq mi (0.28/km^{2})
- Time zone: UTC-6 (CST)
  - Summer (DST): UTC-5 (CDT)
- Area code: 785
- GNIS feature ID: 472048

Valley Township is a township in Phillips County, Kansas, United States. As of the 2020 census, its population was 24.

== Geography ==
Valley Township covers an area of 35.869 square miles (92.90 square kilometers). Part of Kirwin National Wildlife Refuge and Kirwin Reservoir are located within the township.

=== Adjacent townships ===
Kirwin Township, Phillips County
Deer Creek Township, Phillips County	northwest	north	northeast	Valley Township, Smith County
Bow Creek Township, Phillips County	west	self	east	Dor Township, Smith County
Township 2, Rooks County	southwest	south
Township 1, Rooks County
