= Long Island Township, Kansas =

Township in Phillips County, Kansas, U.S.

Long Island Township
- Township
- Location within Phillips County
- Coordinates: 39.952947°N 99.571563°W
- Country: United States
- State: Kansas
- County: Phillips

Government
  - Commissioner District #3: Jerry Gruwell

Area
  - Total: 35.221 sq mi (91.22 km^{2})
  - Land: 35.18 sq mi (91.1 km^{2})
  - Water: 0.041 sq mi (0.11 km^{2}) 0.12%
- Elevation: 2,133 ft (650 m)

Population (2020)
  - Total: 211
  - Density: 6.00/sq mi (2.32/km^{2})
- Time zone: UTC-6 (CST)
  - Summer (DST): UTC-5 (CDT)
- Area code: 785
- GNIS feature ID: 471750

Long Island Township is a township in Phillips County, Kansas, United States. As of the 2020 census, its population was 211.

== Geography ==
Long Island Township covers an area of 35.221 square miles (91.22 square kilometers).

=== Communities ===
- Long Island

=== Adjacent townships ===
Fairfield Township, Harlan County, Nebraska
		north	northeast	Eldorado Township, Harlan County, Nebraska
Almena-District 4 Township, Norton County	west	self	east	Granite Township, Phillips County
		south	southeast	Dayton Township, Phillips County
Prairie View Township, Phillips County

== Transportation ==
=== Major highways ===
- K-383
