= K-60 (Kansas highway) =

State highway in Kansas, U.S.

K-60
- K-60 highlighted in red

Route information
- Maintained by KDOT
- Length: 4.284 mi (6.894 km)
- Existed: c. 1930–present

Major junctions
- South end: US-36 east of Norton
- North end: K-383 south of Almena

Location
- Country: United States
- State: Kansas
- County: Norton

Highway system
- Kansas State Highway System; Interstate; US; State; Spurs
| ← K-59 | → K-61 |

K-60 is a 4.284-mile (6.894 km) north–south state highway in Almena-District 4 Township, Norton County, Kansas, United States. K-60's southern terminus is at U.S. Route 36 (US‑36) east of Norton and the northern terminus is at K-383 south of Almena. The route was established around 1930.

== Route description ==
K‑60 begins at an intersection with US‑36, roughly 11 miles (18 km) east of Norton and 19 miles (31 km) west of Phillipsburg. The highway heads north, surrounded by a grassland terrain marked with several fields. The road turns northwestward. After an intersection with Main Street, K-60 turns back northward towards Almena. The highway ends at an intersection with K-383 near the Kyle Railroad.

The route is maintained by the Kansas Department of Transportation (KDOT), which is responsible for constructing and maintaining highways in the state. As part of this role, KDOT regularly surveys traffic on their highways. These surveys are most often presented in the form of annual average daily traffic, which is the number of vehicles that use a highway during an average day of the year. In 2010, KDOT calculated that a total of 115 vehicles used the road daily, including 20 trucks. No part of the highway has been listed as part of the National Highway System, a network of roads important to the nation's defence, mobility, and economy.

== History ==
K-60 was built and established between 1927 and 1931 by the Kansas State Highway Commission, which was at the time responsible for maintaining highways in Kansas. At this time, the road was surfaced with gravel. The entire route was paved between 1948 and 1950. Since then, the road's designation has not been changed.

== Major intersections ==
The entire route is in Almena-District 4 Township, Norton County.

| mi | km | Destinations | Notes |
|---|---|---|---|
| 0.000 | 0.000 | US-36 – Phillipsburg, Norton | Southern terminus; continues as Road E11 |
| 4.284 | 6.894 | K-383 – Norton, Almena | Northern terminus; former US-383 |
1.000 mi = 1.609 km; 1.000 km = 0.621 mi

== See also ==
- List of state highways in Kansas
- List of highways numbered 60
