= Fairfield Township =

Fairfield Township may refer to:

== Illinois ==
- Fairfield Township, Bureau County, Illinois

== Indiana ==
- Fairfield Township, DeKalb County, Indiana
- Fairfield Township, Franklin County, Indiana
- Fairfield Township, Tippecanoe County, Indiana

== Iowa ==
- Fairfield Township, Buena Vista County, Iowa
- Fairfield Township, Cedar County, Iowa
- Fairfield Township, Fayette County, Iowa
- Fairfield Township, Grundy County, Iowa
- Fairfield Township, Jackson County, Iowa
- Fairfield Township, Palo Alto County, Iowa

== Kansas ==
- Fairfield Township, Russell County, Kansas

== Michigan ==
- Fairfield Township, Lenawee County, Michigan
- Fairfield Township, Shiawassee County, Michigan

== Minnesota ==
- Fairfield Township, Crow Wing County, Minnesota
- Fairfield Township, Swift County, Minnesota

== Missouri ==
- Fairfield Township, Carroll County, Missouri

== Nebraska ==
- Fairfield Township, Clay County, Nebraska
- Fairfield Township, Harlan County, Nebraska

== New Jersey ==
- Fairfield Township, Cumberland County, New Jersey
- Fairfield Township, Essex County, New Jersey

== North Carolina ==
- Fairfield Township, Hyde County, North Carolina, in Hyde County, North Carolina

== North Dakota ==
- Fairfield Township, Grand Forks County, North Dakota, in Grand Forks County, North Dakota

== Ohio ==
- Fairfield Township, Butler County, Ohio
- Fairfield Township, Columbiana County, Ohio
- Fairfield Township, Highland County, Ohio
- Fairfield Township, Huron County, Ohio
- Fairfield Township, Madison County, Ohio
- Fairfield Township, Tuscarawas County, Ohio
- Fairfield Township, Washington County, Ohio

== Pennsylvania ==
- Fairfield Township, Crawford County, Pennsylvania
- Fairfield Township, Lycoming County, Pennsylvania
- Fairfield Township, Westmoreland County, Pennsylvania

== South Dakota ==
- Fairfield Township, Beadle County, South Dakota, in Beadle County, South Dakota
