= Solomon Township, Phillips County, Kansas =

Township in Phillips County, Kansas, U.S.

Solomon Township
- Township
- Location within Phillips County
- Coordinates: 39.697243°N 99.347295°W
- Country: United States
- State: Kansas
- County: Phillips

Government
  - Commissioner District #1: Doug Zillinger

Area
  - Total: 35.64 sq mi (92.3 km^{2})
  - Land: 35.621 sq mi (92.26 km^{2})
  - Water: 0.019 sq mi (0.049 km^{2}) 0.05%
- Elevation: 1,867 ft (569 m)

Population (2020)
  - Total: 148
  - Density: 4.15/sq mi (1.60/km^{2})
- Time zone: UTC-6 (CST)
  - Summer (DST): UTC-5 (CDT)
- Area code: 785
- GNIS feature ID: 472029

Solomon Township is a township in Phillips County, Kansas, United States. As of the 2020 census, its population was 148.

== Geography ==
Solomon Township covers an area of 35.64 square miles (92.3 square kilometers).

=== Communities ===
- Glade

=== Adjacent townships ===
Phillipsburg Township, Phillips County
Mound Township, Phillips County	northwest	north	northeast	Arcade Township, Phillips County
Belmont Township, Phillips County	west	self	east	Deer Creek Township, Phillips County
Plainview Township, Phillips County	southwest	south	southeast	Bow Creek Township, Phillips County
Rushville Township, Phillips County

== Transportation ==
=== Major highways ===
- US-183
- K-9
