= Solomon-District 3 Township, Kansas =

Township in Norton County, Kansas, U.S.

Solomon-District 3 Township
- Township
- Location within Norton County
- Coordinates: 39.66886°N 99.764987°W
- Country: United States
- State: Kansas
- County: Norton

Area
  - Total: 191.405 sq mi (495.74 km^{2})
  - Land: 191.359 sq mi (495.62 km^{2})
  - Water: 0.046 sq mi (0.12 km^{2}) 0.02%

Population (2020)
  - Total: 137
  - Density: 0.716/sq mi (0.276/km^{2})
- Time zone: UTC-6 (CST)
  - Summer (DST): UTC-5 (CDT)
- Area code: 785

Solomon-District 3 Township is a township in Norton County, Kansas, United States. As of the 2020 census, its population was 137.

== Geography ==
Solomon-District 3 Township covers an area of 191.405 square miles (495.74 square kilometers).

=== Communities ===
- Edmond
- Densmore

=== Adjacent townships ===
- Almena-District 4 Township, Norton County (north)
- Beaver Township, Phillips County (northeast)
- Logan Township, Phillips County (east-northeast)
- Towanda Township, Phillips County (east-southeast)
- Pioneer Township, Graham County (southeast)
- Graham Township, Graham County (southwest)
- Highland-District 2 Township, Norton County (west)
- Center-District 1 Township, Norton County (northwest)

=== Major highways ===
- US-283
- K-9
