= Sumner Township, Phillips County, Kansas =

Township in Phillips County, Kansas, U.S.

Sumner Township
- Township
- Location within Phillips County
- Coordinates: 39.952616°N 99.113489°W
- Country: United States
- State: Kansas
- County: Phillips

Government
  - Commissioner District #3: Jerry Gruwell

Area
  - Total: 35.529 sq mi (92.02 km^{2})
  - Land: 35.416 sq mi (91.73 km^{2})
  - Water: 0.113 sq mi (0.29 km^{2}) 0.32%
- Elevation: 2,120 ft (650 m)

Population (2020)
  - Total: 35
  - Density: 0.99/sq mi (0.38/km^{2})
- Time zone: UTC-6 (CST)
  - Summer (DST): UTC-5 (CDT)
- Area code: 785
- GNIS feature ID: 471793

Sumner Township is a township in Phillips County, Kansas, United States. As of the 2020 census, its population was 35.

== Geography ==
Sumner Township covers an area of 35.529 square miles (92.02 square kilometers).

=== Adjacent townships ===
Turkey Creek Township, Franklin County, Nebraska
Republican City Township, Harlan County, Nebraska	northwest	north	northeast	East Bloomington Township, Franklin County, Nebraska
Glenwood Township, Phillips County	west	self	east	German Township, Smith County
Greenwood Township, Phillips County	southwest	south	southeast	Swan Township, Smith County
Crystal Township, Phillips County
