= Belmont Township =

Belmont Township may refer to:

- Belmont Township, Iroquois County, Illinois
- Belmont Township, Warren County, Iowa
- Belmont Township, Kingman County, Kansas
- Belmont Township, Phillips County, Kansas, in Phillips County, Kansas
- Belmont Township, Jackson County, Minnesota
- Belmont Township, Douglas County, South Dakota, in Douglas County, South Dakota
- Belmont Township, Spink County, South Dakota, in Spink County, South Dakota
