= Prairie View Township, Kansas =

Township in Phillips County, Kansas, U.S.

Prairie View Township
- Township
- Location within Phillips County
- Coordinates: 39.895662°N 99.560503°W
- Country: United States
- State: Kansas
- County: Phillips

Government
  - Commissioner District #3: Jerry Gruwell

Area
  - Total: 35.591 sq mi (92.18 km^{2})
  - Land: 35.545 sq mi (92.06 km^{2})
  - Water: 0.046 sq mi (0.12 km^{2}) 0.13%
- Elevation: 2,287 ft (697 m)

Population (2020)
  - Total: 165
  - Density: 4.64/sq mi (1.79/km^{2})
- Time zone: UTC-6 (CST)
  - Summer (DST): UTC-5 (CDT)
- Area code: 785
- GNIS feature ID: 471751

Prairie View Township is a township in Phillips County, Kansas, United States. As of the 2020 census, its population was 165.

== Geography ==
Prairie View Township covers an area of 35.591 square miles (92.18 square kilometers).

=== Communities ===
- Prairie View

=== Adjacent townships ===
Long Island Township, Phillips County
		north	northeast	Granite Township, Phillips County
Almena-District 4 Township, Norton County	west	self	east	Dayton Township, Phillips County
		south	southeast	Mound Township, Phillips County
Beaver Township, Phillips County

== Transportation ==
=== Major highways ===
- US-36
