= Towanda Township, Phillips County, Kansas =

Township in Phillips County, Kansas, U.S.

Towanda Township
- Township
- Location within Phillips County
- Coordinates: 39.614499°N 99.573349°W
- Country: United States
- State: Kansas
- County: Phillips

Government
  - Commissioner District #1: Doug Zillinger

Area
  - Total: 36.008 sq mi (93.26 km^{2})
  - Land: 35.936 sq mi (93.07 km^{2})
  - Water: 0.072 sq mi (0.19 km^{2}) 0.20%
- Elevation: 2,139 ft (652 m)

Population (2020)
  - Total: 28
  - Density: 0.78/sq mi (0.30/km^{2})
- Time zone: UTC-6 (CST)
  - Summer (DST): UTC-5 (CDT)
- Area code: 785
- GNIS feature ID: 472021

Towanda Township is a township in Phillips County, Kansas, United States. As of the 2020 census, its population was 28.

== Geography ==
Towanda Township covers an area of 36.008 square miles (93.26 square kilometers).

=== Adjacent townships ===
Logan Township, Phillips County
		north	northeast	Belmont Township, Phillips County
Solomon-District 3 Township, Norton County	west	self	east	Plainview Township, Phillips County
Pioneer Township, Graham County	southwest	south
Township 5, Rooks County
