= Gretna, Kansas =

Unincorporated community in Phillips County, Kansas

- Unincorporated community
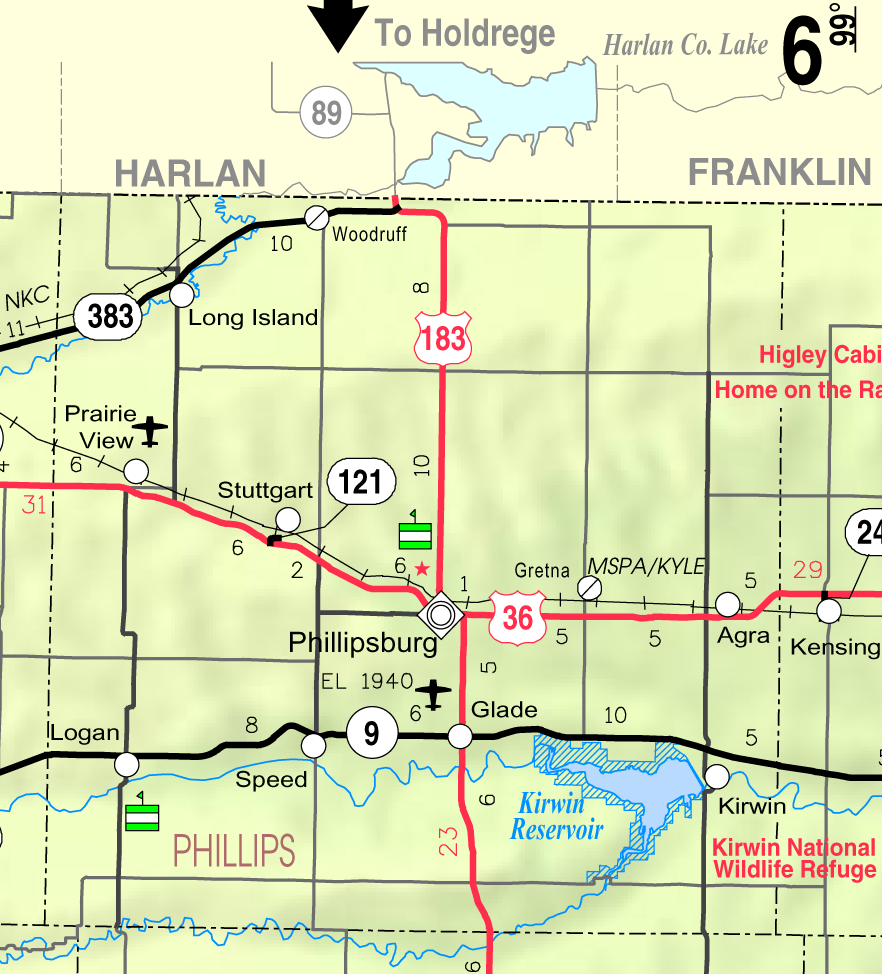
- KDOT map of Phillips County (legend)

- Location within the state of Kansas Gretna (the United States)
- Coordinates: 39.7652881°N 99.2128695°W
- Country: United States
- State: Kansas
- County: Phillips
- Elevation: 1,873 ft (571 m)
- Time zone: UTC-6 (CST)
  - Summer (DST): UTC-5 (CDT)
- Area code: 785
- FIPS code: 20-28825
- GNIS ID: 471932

Gretna is an unincorporated community in Phillips County, Kansas, United States.

== History ==
Gretna was a station on the Chicago, Rock Island and Pacific Railroad.

The post office in Gretna, established 1907, was discontinued in 1945.
