= Freedom Township, Phillips County, Kansas =

Township in Phillips County, Kansas, U.S.

Freedom Township
- Township
- Location within Phillips County
- Coordinates: 39.871954°N 99.341654°W
- Country: United States
- State: Kansas
- County: Phillips

Government
  - Commissioner District #3: Jerry Gruwell

Area
  - Total: 35.688 sq mi (92.43 km^{2})
  - Land: 35.654 sq mi (92.34 km^{2})
  - Water: 0.034 sq mi (0.088 km^{2}) 0.10%
- Elevation: 2,110 ft (640 m)

Population (2020)
  - Total: 77
  - Density: 2.2/sq mi (0.83/km^{2})
- Time zone: UTC-6 (CST)
  - Summer (DST): UTC-5 (CDT)
- Area code: 785
- GNIS feature ID: 471761

Freedom Township is a township in Phillips County, Kansas, United States. As of the 2020 census, its population was 68.

== Geography ==
Freedom Township covers an area of 35.688 square miles (92.43 square kilometers).

=== Adjacent townships ===
Walnut Township, Phillips County
Granite Township, Phillips County	northwest	north	northeast	Glenwood Township, Phillips County
Dayton Township, Phillips County	west	self	east	Greenwood Township, Phillips County
Mound Township, Phillips County	southwest	south	southeast	Arcade Township, Phillips County
Phillipsburg Township, Phillips County

== Transportation ==
=== Major highways ===
- US-183
