= Phillipsburg Township, Kansas =

Township in Phillips County, Kansas, U.S.

Phillipsburg Township
- Township
- Location within Phillips County
- Coordinates: 39.792531°N 99.352125°W
- Country: United States
- State: Kansas
- County: Phillips

Government
  - Commissioner District #1: Doug Zillinger

Area
  - Total: 34.376 sq mi (89.03 km^{2})
  - Land: 34.371 sq mi (89.02 km^{2})
  - Water: 0.005 sq mi (0.013 km^{2}) 0.01%
- Elevation: 1,933 ft (589 m)

Population (2020)
  - Total: 242
  - Density: 7.04/sq mi (2.72/km^{2})
- Time zone: UTC-6 (CST)
  - Summer (DST): UTC-5 (CDT)
- Area code: 785
- GNIS feature ID: 471926

Phillipsburg Township is a township in Phillips County, Kansas, United States. As of the 2020 census, its population was 242.

== Geography ==
Phillipsburg Township covers an area of 34.376 square miles (89.03 square kilometers).

=== Adjacent townships ===
Freedom Township, Phillips County
Dayton Township, Phillips County	northwest	north	northeast	Greenwood Township, Phillips County
Mound Township, Phillips County	west	self	east	Arcade Township, Phillips County
Belmont Township, Phillips County	southwest	south	southeast	Deer Creek Township, Phillips County
Solomon Township, Phillips County

== Transportation ==
=== Major highways ===
- US-36
- US-183
