= Rushville Township, Kansas =

Township in Phillips County, Kansas, U.S.

Rushville Township
- Township
- Location within Phillips County
- Coordinates: 39.610897°N 99.34675°W
- Country: United States
- State: Kansas
- County: Phillips

Government
  - Commissioner District #1: Doug Zillinger

Area
  - Total: 35.973 sq mi (93.17 km^{2})
  - Land: 35.973 sq mi (93.17 km^{2})
  - Water: 0 sq mi (0 km^{2}) 0%
- Elevation: 2,041 ft (622 m)

Population (2020)
  - Total: 30
  - Density: 0.83/sq mi (0.32/km^{2})
- Time zone: UTC-6 (CST)
  - Summer (DST): UTC-5 (CDT)
- Area code: 785
- GNIS feature ID: 472033

Rushville Township is a township in Phillips County, Kansas, United States. As of the 2020 census, its population was 30.

== Geography ==
Rushville Township covers an area of 35.973 square miles (93.17 square kilometers).

=== Adjacent townships ===
Solomon Township, Phillips County
Belmont Township, Phillips County	northwest	north	northeast	Deer Creek Township, Phillips County
Plainview Township, Phillips County	west	self	east	Bow Creek Township, Phillips County
Township 5, Rooks County	southwest	south
Township 3, Rooks County

== Transportation ==
=== Major highways ===
- US-183
