= West Cedar, Kansas =

- Ghost town
- Location within state of Kansas
- Coordinates: 39°49′46″N 99°07′25″W
- Country: United States
- State: Kansas
- County: Phillips
- Elevation: 1,883 ft (574 m)

Population
  - Total: 0
- Time zone: UTC-6 (CST)
  - Summer (DST): UTC-5 (CDT)
- GNIS ID: 482453

West Cedar is a ghost town in Phillips County, Kansas, United States.

== History ==
West Cedar was issued a post office in 1874. The post office was discontinued in 1888.
