= Dayton Township, Phillips County, Kansas =

Township in Phillips County, Kansas, U.S.

Dayton Township
- Township
- Location within Phillips County
- Coordinates: 39.872342°N 99.457599°W
- Country: United States
- State: Kansas
- County: Phillips

Government
  - Commissioner District #3: Jerry Gruwell

Area
  - Total: 35.758 sq mi (92.61 km^{2})
  - Land: 35.723 sq mi (92.52 km^{2})
  - Water: 0.035 sq mi (0.091 km^{2}) 0.10%
- Elevation: 2,188 ft (667 m)

Population (2020)
  - Total: 48
  - Density: 1.3/sq mi (0.52/km^{2})
- Time zone: UTC-6 (CST)
  - Summer (DST): UTC-5 (CDT)
- Area code: 785
- GNIS feature ID: 471759

Dayton Township is a township in Phillips County, Kansas, United States. As of the 2020 census, its population was 48.

== Geography ==
Dayton Township covers an area of 35.758 square miles (92.61 square kilometers).

=== Adjacent townships ===
Granite Township, Phillips County
Long Island Township, Phillips County	northwest	north	northeast	Walnut Township, Phillips County
Prairie View Township, Phillips County	west	self	east	Freedom Township, Phillips County
Beaver Township, Phillips County	southwest	south	southeast	Phillipsburg Township, Phillips County
Mound Township, Phillips County
