= Plum Township, Kansas =

Township in Phillips County, Kansas, U.S.

Plum Township
- Township
- Location within Phillips County
- Coordinates: 39.781129°N 99.113471°W
- Country: United States
- State: Kansas
- County: Phillips

Government
  - Commissioner District #3: Jerry Gruwell

Area
  - Total: 35.85 sq mi (92.9 km^{2})
  - Land: 35.753 sq mi (92.60 km^{2})
  - Water: 0.097 sq mi (0.25 km^{2}) 0.27%
- Elevation: 1,903 ft (580 m)

Population (2020)
  - Total: 331
  - Density: 9.26/sq mi (3.57/km^{2})
- Time zone: UTC-6 (CST)
  - Summer (DST): UTC-5 (CDT)
- Area code: 785
- GNIS feature ID: 471942

Plum Township is a township in Phillips County, Kansas, United States. As of the 2020 census, its population was 331.

== Geography ==
Plum Township covers an area of 35.85 square miles (92.9 square kilometers).

=== Communities ===
- Agra

=== Adjacent townships ===
Crystal Township, Phillips County
Greenwood Township, Phillips County	northwest	north	northeast	Swan Township, Smith County
Arcade Township, Phillips County	west	self	east	Cedar Township, Smith County
Deer Creek Township, Phillips County	southwest	south	southeast	Valley Township, Smith County
Kirwin Township, Phillips County

== Transportation ==
=== Major highways ===
- US-36
