= Matteson, Kansas =

- Ghost town
- Location within state of Kansas
- Coordinates: 39°53′25″N 99°09′41″W
- Country: United States
- State: Kansas
- County: Phillips
- Elevation: 1,995 ft (608 m)

Population
  - Total: 0
- Time zone: UTC-6 (CST)
  - Summer (DST): UTC-5 (CDT)
- GNIS ID: 482454

Matteson is a ghost town in Crystal Township, Phillips County, Kansas, United States.

== History ==
Matteson was issued a post office in 1875. The post office was discontinued in 1894.
