= Myrtle, Kansas =

- Ghost town
- Location within state of Kansas
- Coordinates: 39°58′20″N 99°21′38″W
- Country: United States
- State: Kansas
- County: Phillips
- Elevation: 2,103 ft (641 m)

Population
  - Total: 0
- Time zone: UTC-6 (CST)
  - Summer (DST): UTC-5 (CDT)
- GNIS ID: 482446

Myrtle is a ghost town in Walnut Township, Phillips County, Kansas, United States.

== History ==
Myrtle was issued a post office in 1878. The post office was discontinued in 1904.
