= Greenwood Township, Phillips County, Kansas =

Township in Phillips County, Kansas, U.S.

Greenwood Township
- Township
- Location within Phillips County
- Coordinates: 39.875558°N 99.234541°W
- Country: United States
- State: Kansas
- County: Phillips

Government
  - Commissioner District #3: Jerry Gruwell

Area
  - Total: 35.555 sq mi (92.09 km^{2})
  - Land: 35.536 sq mi (92.04 km^{2})
  - Water: 0.019 sq mi (0.049 km^{2}) 0.05%
- Elevation: 1,992 ft (607 m)

Population (2020)
  - Total: 38
  - Density: 1.1/sq mi (0.41/km^{2})
- Time zone: UTC-6 (CST)
  - Summer (DST): UTC-5 (CDT)
- Area code: 785
- GNIS feature ID: 471782

Greenwood Township is a township in Phillips County, Kansas, United States. As of the 2020 census, its population was 38.

== Geography ==
Greenwood Township covers an area of 35.555 square miles (92.09 square kilometers).

=== Adjacent townships ===
Gleenwood Township, Phillips County
| Walnut Township, Phillips County | northwest | north | northeast | Sumner Township, Phillips County |
| Freedom Township, Phillips County | west | self | east | Crystal Township, Phillips County |
| Phillipsburg Township, Phillips County | southwest | south | southeast | Plum Township, Phillips County |
Arcade Township, Phillips County
