= Eldorado Township =

Eldorado Township may refer to the following townships in the United States:

- Eldorado Township, McDonough County, Illinois
- Eldorado Township, Minnesota
- Eldorado Township, Benton County, Iowa
- Eldorado Township, Clay County, Nebraska
- Eldorado Township, Harlan County, Nebraska
- Eldorado Township, Montgomery County, North Carolina

== See also ==
- El Dorado Township, Butler County, Kansas
