= Crystal Township, Kansas =

Township in Phillips County, Kansas, U.S.

Crystal Township
- Township
- Location within Phillips County
- Coordinates: 39.868605°N 99.118161°W
- Country: United States
- State: Kansas
- County: Phillips

Government
  - Commissioner District #3: Jerry Gruwell

Area
  - Total: 35.758 sq mi (92.61 km^{2})
  - Land: 35.69 sq mi (92.4 km^{2})
  - Water: 0.068 sq mi (0.18 km^{2}) 0.19%
- Elevation: 2,051 ft (625 m)

Population (2020)
  - Total: 42
  - Density: 1.2/sq mi (0.45/km^{2})
- Time zone: UTC-6 (CST)
  - Summer (DST): UTC-5 (CDT)
- Area code: 785
- GNIS feature ID: 471794

Crystal Township is a township in Phillips County, Kansas, United States. As of the 2020 census, its population was 42.

== Geography ==
Crystal Township covers an area of 35.758 square miles (92.61 square kilometers).

=== Adjacent townships ===
Sumner Township, Phillips County
Glenwood Township, Phillips County	northwest	north	northeast	German Township, Smith County
Greenwood Township, Phillips County	west	self	east	Swan Township, Smith County
Arcade Township, Phillips County	southwest	south	southeast	Cedar Township, Smith County
Plum Township, Phillips County
