= Powell, Kansas =

- Ghost town
- Location within state of Kansas
- Coordinates: 39°36′10″N 99°18′26″W
- Country: United States
- State: Kansas
- County: Phillips
- Elevation: 1,949 ft (594 m)

Population
  - Total: 0
- Time zone: UTC-6 (CST)
  - Summer (DST): UTC-5 (CDT)
- GNIS ID: 482457

Powell is a ghost town in Rushville Township, Phillips County, Kansas, United States.

== History ==
Powell was issued a post office in 1882. The post office was discontinued in 1905.
