= Pleasant Green, Kansas =

- Ghost town
- Location within state of Kansas
- Coordinates: 39°55′48″N 99°07′25″W
- Country: United States
- State: Kansas
- County: Phillips
- Elevation: 2,060 ft (630 m)

Population
  - Total: 0
- Time zone: UTC-6 (CST)
  - Summer (DST): UTC-5 (CDT)
- GNIS ID: 481973

Pleasant Green is a ghost town in Sumner Township, Phillips County, Kansas, United States.

== History ==
Pleasant Green was issued a post office in 1877. The post office was discontinued in 1904.
