= Beaver Township, Phillips County, Kansas =

Township in Phillips County, Kansas, U.S.

Beaver Township
- Township
- Location within Phillips County
- Coordinates: 39.784834°N 99.580603°W
- Country: United States
- State: Kansas
- County: Phillips

Government
  - Commissioner District #1: Douglas Zillinger

Area
  - Total: 35.852 sq mi (92.86 km^{2})
  - Land: 35.835 sq mi (92.81 km^{2})
  - Water: 0.017 sq mi (0.044 km^{2}) 0.05%
- Elevation: 2,225 ft (678 m)

Population (2020)
  - Total: 53
  - Density: 1.5/sq mi (0.57/km^{2})
- Time zone: UTC-6 (CST)
  - Summer (DST): UTC-5 (CDT)
- Area code: 785
- GNIS feature ID: 471912

Beaver Township is a township in Phillips County, Kansas, United States. As of the 2020 census, its population was 53.

== Geography ==
Beaver Township covers an area of 35.852 square miles (92.86 square kilometers).

=== Adjacent townships ===
Prairie View Township, Phillips County
		north	northeast	Dayton Township, Phillips County
Almena-District 4 Township, Norton County	west	self	east	Mound Township, Phillips County
Solomon-District 3 Township, Norton County	southwest	south	southeast	Belmont Township, Phillips County
Logan Township, Phillips County

== Transportation ==
=== Major highways ===
- US-36
