= Township 2, Rooks County, Kansas =

Township in Rooks County, Kansas, U.S.

Township 2
- Township
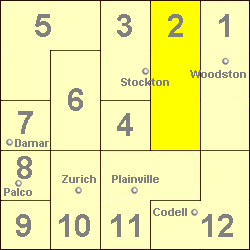
- Location in Rooks County

- Location within state of Kansas
- Coordinates: 39°26′13″N 99°12′44″W
- Country: United States
- State: Kansas
- County: Rooks
- Established: 1971

Area
  - Total: 107.491 sq mi (278.40 km^{2})
  - Land: 107.236 sq mi (277.74 km^{2})
  - Water: 0.255 sq mi (0.66 km^{2}) 0.24%
- Elevation: 1,745 ft (532 m)

Population (2020)
  - Total: 360
  - Density: 3.4/sq mi (1.3/km^{2})
- Time zone: UTC-6 (CST)
  - Summer (DST): UTC-5 (CDT)
- Area code: 785
- GNIS feature ID: 472231

Township 2 is a township in Rooks County, Kansas, United States. As of the 2020 census, its population was 360.

== History ==
Rooks County was established with four townships: Bow Creek, Lowell, Paradise and Stockton. That number increased to seven by 1878 and twenty three in 1925. The twenty three townships were in place until 1971 when the number was reduced to the current twelve townships.

Township 2 was formed from Rooks County townships Greenfield, Iowa and Lanark in 1971, pursuant to Kansas Statute 80-1110. The statute allowed for the dissolution of townships and the assignment of those territories to contiguous townships.

Elm Creek flows through the southern part of Township 2 into South Fork Solomon River. Jim Creek and Douglas Creek flow through the northern part of Township 2 into South Fork Solomon River.

=== Greenfield Township ===
Greenfield Township was created from parts of Lowell and Stockton townships in 1879, with the eastern half from Lowell and the western half from Stockton.

=== Iowa Township ===
Iowa Township was created from parts of Lowell and Stockton townships in 1879, with the eastern half from Lowell and the western half from Stockton.

=== Lanark Township ===
Lanark Township was created from part of Farmington Township in 1879. Farmington had been created a year earlier from Bow Creek and Lowell townships. Lanark was named for Lanarkshire, Scotland, the birthplace of an early settler in the territory.

== Geography ==
Township 2 covers an area of 107.491 square miles (278.40 square kilometers).

=== Communities ===
- part of Stockton

=== Adjacent townships ===
Bow Creek Township, Phillips County
		north	northeast	Valley Township, Phillips County
Township 3, Rooks County	west	self	east	Township 1, Rooks County
Township 4, Rooks County	southwest	south	southeast	Township 12, Rooks County
Township 11, Rooks County

== Transportation ==
=== Major highways ===
- US-24
