= Plainview Township, Kansas =

Township in Phillips County, Kansas, U.S.

Plainview Township
- Township
- Location within Phillips County
- Coordinates: 39.612835°N 99.459667°W
- Country: United States
- State: Kansas
- County: Phillips

Government
  - Commissioner District #1: Doug Zillinger

Area
  - Total: 36.023 sq mi (93.30 km^{2})
  - Land: 36.019 sq mi (93.29 km^{2})
  - Water: 0.004 sq mi (0.010 km^{2}) 0.01%
- Elevation: 2,038 ft (621 m)

Population (2020)
  - Total: 28
  - Density: 0.78/sq mi (0.30/km^{2})
- Time zone: UTC-6 (CST)
  - Summer (DST): UTC-5 (CDT)
- Area code: 785
- GNIS feature ID: 472028

Plainview Township is a township in Phillips County, Kansas, United States. As of the 2020 census, its population was 28.

== Geography ==
Plainview Township covers an area of 36.023 square miles (93.30 square kilometers).

=== Adjacent townships ===
Belmont Township, Phillips County
Logan Township, Phillips County	northwest	north	northeast	Solomon Township, Phillips County
Towanda Township, Phillips County	west	self	east	Rushville Township, Phillips County
		south
Township 5, Rooks County
