= Dickeyville, Kansas =

- Ghost town
- Location within state of Kansas
- Coordinates: 39°50′40″N 99°24′16″W
- Country: United States
- State: Kansas
- County: Phillips
- Elevation: 2,123 ft (647 m)

Population
  - Total: 0
- Time zone: UTC-6 (CST)
  - Summer (DST): UTC-5 (CDT)
- GNIS ID: 482450

Dickeyville is a ghost town in Dayton Township, Phillips County, Kansas, United States.

== History ==
Dickeyville was issued a post office in 1874. The post office was discontinued in 1895.
