= Logan Township, Phillips County, Kansas =

Township in Phillips County, Kansas, U.S.

Logan Township
- Township
- Location within Phillips County
- Coordinates: 39.68823°N 99.571873°W
- Country: United States
- State: Kansas
- County: Phillips

Government
  - Commissioner District #1: Doug Zillinger

Area
  - Total: 35.892 sq mi (92.96 km^{2})
  - Land: 35.881 sq mi (92.93 km^{2})
  - Water: 0.011 sq mi (0.028 km^{2}) 0.03%
- Elevation: 2,031 ft (619 m)

Population (2020)
  - Total: 513
  - Density: 14.3/sq mi (5.52/km^{2})
- Time zone: UTC-6 (CST)
  - Summer (DST): UTC-5 (CDT)
- Area code: 785
- GNIS feature ID: 472020

Logan Township is a township in Phillips County, Kansas, United States. As of the 2020 census, its population was 513.

== Geography ==
Logan Township covers an area of 35.892 square miles (92.96 square kilometers).

=== Communities ===
- Logan

=== Adjacent townships ===
Beaver Township, Phillips County
| Almena-District 4 Township, Norton County | northwest | north | northeast | Mound Township, Phillips County |
| Solomon-District 3 Township, Norton County | west | self | east | Belmont Township, Phillips County |
| | | south | southeast | Plainview Township, Phillips County |
Towanda Township, Phillips County

== Transportation ==
=== Major highways ===
- K-9
