= Crow, Kansas =

- Ghost town
- Location within state of Kansas
- Coordinates: 39°55′30″N 98°12′21″W
- Country: United States
- State: Kansas
- County: Phillips
- Elevation: 2,149 ft (655 m)

Population
  - Total: 0
- Time zone: UTC-6 (CST)
  - Summer (DST): UTC-5 (CDT)
- GNIS ID: 482448

Crow is a ghost town in Phillips County, Kansas, United States. GPS link on this page goes to 'Crow, Harrison Township, Jewell County, Kansas.'

== History ==
Crow was issued a post office in 1881. The post office was discontinued in 1901.
