= Luctor, Kansas =

- Ghost town
- Location within state of Kansas
- Coordinates: 39°51′47″N 99°32′02″W
- Country: United States
- State: Kansas
- County: Phillips
- Elevation: 2,188 ft (667 m)

Population
  - Total: 0
- Time zone: UTC-6 (CST)
  - Summer (DST): UTC-5 (CDT)
- GNIS ID: 481933

Luctor is a ghost town in Prairie View Township, Phillips County, Kansas, United States.

== History ==
Luctor was issued a post office in 1885. The post office was discontinued in 1903. The population in 1910 was 53.
