= Kirwin City Hall =

- U.S. National Register of Historic Places
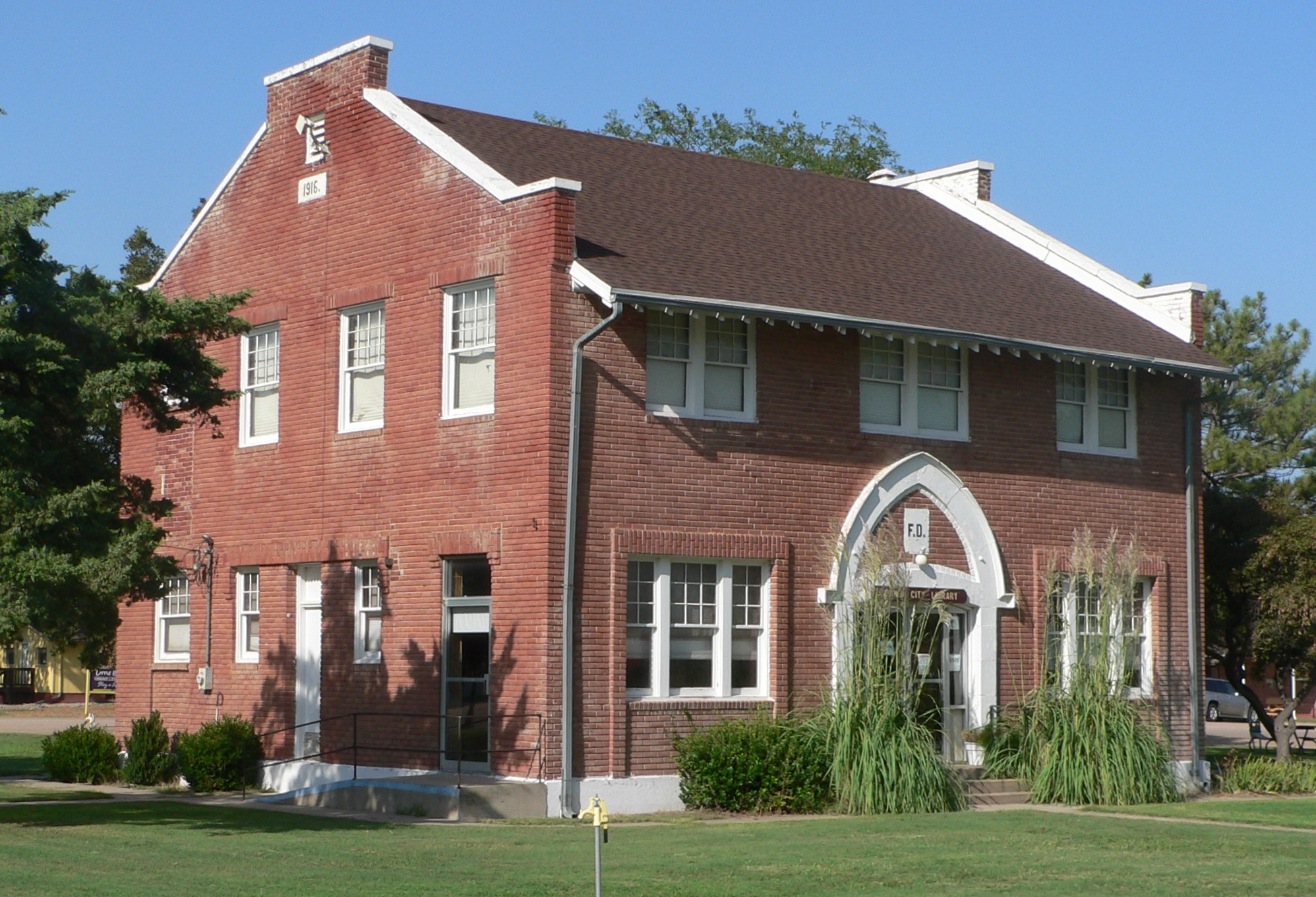

- Location within Kansas
- Location: 1st and Main Sts., Kirwin, Kansas
- Coordinates: 39°40′23″N 99°07′20″W
- Area: less than one acre
- Built: 1916
- Architect: E.T. Archer & Co.
- Architectural style: Late Gothic Revival, Bungalow/craftsman
- NRHP reference No.: 06000471
- Added to NRHP: June 7, 2006

The Kirwin City Hall, at 1st and Main Streets in Kirwin, Kansas, was built in 1916. It was listed on the National Register of Historic Places in 2006.

It has also served as the Kirwin City Library. In 2004 it hosted the City Clerk's office and the city's library.

It was designed by E.T. Archer & Co. It was described in its NRHP nomination as an "interesting product of the Arts and Crafts movement that blends the Collegiate Gothic style, which is seen primarily in the prominent pointed-arch entries, with some traditional Craftsman style influences."
