= Arcade Township, Kansas =

Township in Phillips County, Kansas, U.S.

Arcade Township
- Township
- Location within Phillips County
- Coordinates: 39.788331°N 99.233355°W
- Country: United States
- State: Kansas
- County: Phillips

Government
  - Commissioner District #1: Douglas Zillinger

Area
  - Total: 35.674 sq mi (92.40 km^{2})
  - Land: 35.665 sq mi (92.37 km^{2})
  - Water: 0.009 sq mi (0.023 km^{2}) 0.03%
- Elevation: 1,877 ft (572 m)

Population (2020)
  - Total: 88
  - Density: 2.5/sq mi (0.95/km^{2})
- Time zone: UTC-6 (CST)
  - Summer (DST): UTC-5 (CDT)
- Area code: 785
- GNIS feature ID: 471931

Arcade Township is a township in Phillips County, Kansas, United States. As of the 2020 census, its population was 88.

== Geography ==
Arcade Township covers an area of 35.674 square miles (92.40 square kilometers).

=== Adjacent townships ===
Greenwood Township, Phillips County
Freedom Township, Phillips County	northwest	north	northeast	Crystal Township, Phillips County
Phillipsburg Township, Phillips County	west	self	east	Plum Township, Phillips County
Solomon Township, Phillips County	southwest	south	southeast	Kirwin Township, Phillips County
Deer Creek Township, Phillips County

== Transportation ==
=== Major highways ===
- US-36
