= Mound Township, Phillips County, Kansas =

Township in Phillips County, Kansas, U.S.

Mound Township
- Township
- Location within Phillips County
- Coordinates: 39.784911°N 99.459174°W
- Country: United States
- State: Kansas
- County: Phillips

Government
  - Commissioner District #1: Doug Zillinger

Area
  - Total: 35.937 sq mi (93.08 km^{2})
  - Land: 35.937 sq mi (93.08 km^{2})
  - Water: 0 sq mi (0 km^{2}) 0%
- Elevation: 2,057 ft (627 m)

Population (2020)
  - Total: 96
  - Density: 2.7/sq mi (1.0/km^{2})
- Time zone: UTC-6 (CST)
  - Summer (DST): UTC-5 (CDT)
- Area code: 785
- GNIS feature ID: 471918

Mound Township is a township in Phillips County, Kansas, United States. As of the 2020 census, its population was 96.

== Geography ==
Mound Township covers an area of 35.937 square miles (93.08 square kilometers).

=== Communities ===
- Stuttgart

=== Adjacent townships ===
Dayton Township, Phillips County
Prairie Township, Phillips County	northwest	north	northeast	Freedom Township, Phillips County
Beaver Township, Phillips County	west	self	east	Phillipsburg Township, Phillips County
Logan Township, Phillips County	southwest	south	southeast	Solomon Township, Phillips County
Belmont Township, Phillips County

== Transportation ==
=== Major highways ===
- US-36
