= Glade, Kansas =

City in Phillips County, Kansas

- City
- Location within Phillips County and Kansas

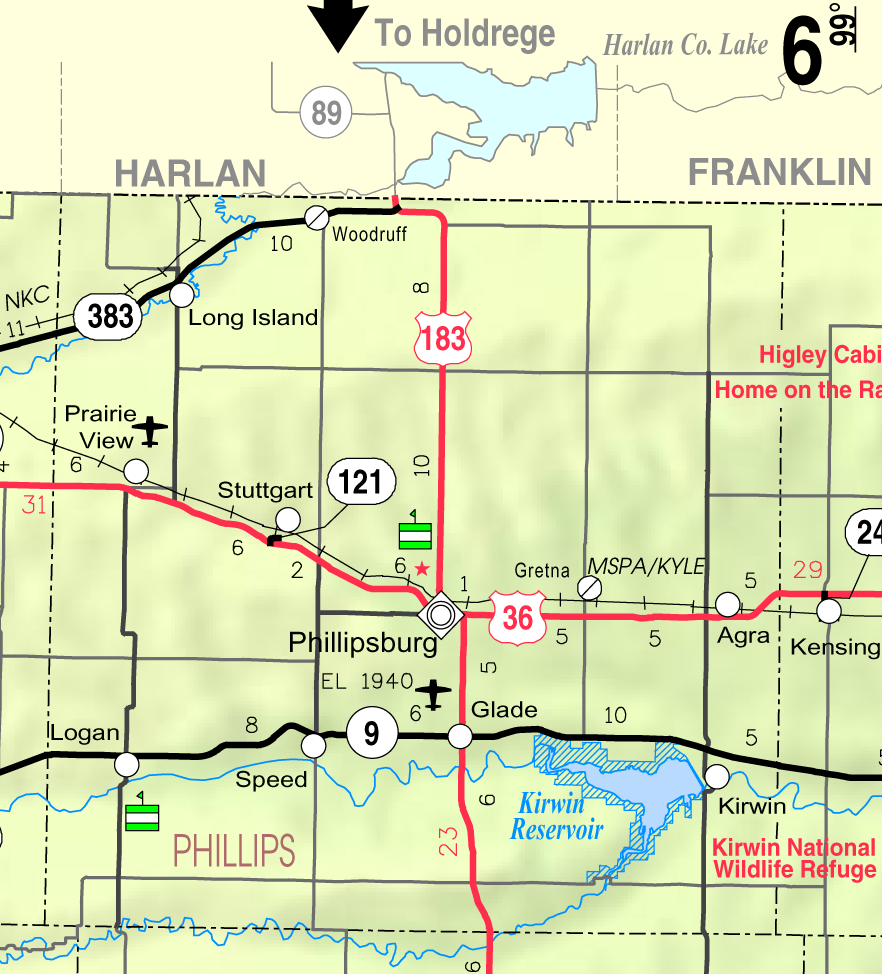
- KDOT map of Phillips County (legend)
- Coordinates: 39°41′01″N 99°18′42″W
- Country: United States
- State: Kansas
- County: Phillips
- Incorporated: 1948

Area
  - Total: 0.27 sq mi (0.69 km^{2})
  - Land: 0.27 sq mi (0.69 km^{2})
  - Water: 0 sq mi (0.00 km^{2})
- Elevation: 1,811 ft (552 m)

Population (2020)
  - Total: 52
  - Density: 200/sq mi (75/km^{2})
- Time zone: UTC-6 (CST)
  - Summer (DST): UTC-5 (CDT)
- ZIP Code: 67639
- Area code: 785
- FIPS code: 20-26325
- GNIS ID: 2394906

Glade is a city in Phillips County, Kansas, United States. As of the 2020 census, the population of the city was 52.

== History ==
At some point in the past, this community was previously named Marvin.

Glade was a shipping point on the Atchison & Lenora division of the Missouri Pacific railroad.

A post office was opened in Glade in 1908, and remained in operation until 1989. It was officially discontinued in 1996.

== Geography ==
According to the United States Census Bureau, the city has a total area of 0.25 square miles (0.65 km^{2}), all land.

== Demographics ==
Historical population
Census	Pop.	Note	%±
1950	107		—
1960	133		24.3%
1970	180		35.3%
1980	131		−27.2%
1990	101		−22.9%
2000	114		12.9%
2010	96		−15.8%
2020	52		−45.8%
U.S. Decennial Census

=== 2020 census ===
The 2020 United States census counted 52 people, 27 households, and 16 families in Glade. The population density was 194.0 per square mile (74.9/km^{2}). There were 41 housing units at an average density of 153.0 per square mile (59.1/km^{2}). The racial makeup was 92.31% (48) white or European American (92.31% non-Hispanic white), 0.0% (0) black or African-American, 0.0% (0) Native American or Alaska Native, 0.0% (0) Asian, 0.0% (0) Pacific Islander or Native Hawaiian, 0.0% (0) from other races, and 7.69% (4) from two or more races. Hispanic or Latino of any race was 1.92% (1) of the population.

Of the 27 households, 18.5% had children under the age of 18; 48.1% were married couples living together; 25.9% had a female householder with no spouse or partner present. 37.0% of households consisted of individuals and 33.3% had someone living alone who was 65 years of age or older. The average household size was 1.9 and the average family size was 2.6. The percent of those with a bachelor's degree or higher was estimated to be 11.5% of the population.

13.5% of the population was under the age of 18, 9.6% from 18 to 24, 11.5% from 25 to 44, 40.4% from 45 to 64, and 25.0% who were 65 years of age or older. The median age was 56.5 years. For every 100 females, there were 100.0 males. For every 100 females ages 18 and older, there were 87.5 males.

=== 2010 census ===
As of the census of 2010, there were 96 people, 39 households, and 24 families residing in the city. The population density was 384.0 inhabitants per square mile (148.3/km^{2}). There were 56 housing units at an average density of 224.0 per square mile (86.5/km^{2}). The racial makeup of the city was 99.0% White and 1.0% from two or more races. Hispanic or Latino of any race were 1.0% of the population.

There were 39 households, of which 30.8% had children under the age of 18 living with them, 51.3% were married couples living together, 5.1% had a female householder with no husband present, 5.1% had a male householder with no wife present, and 38.5% were non-families. 35.9% of all households were made up of individuals, and 12.9% had someone living alone who was 65 years of age or older. The average household size was 2.46 and the average family size was 3.13.

The median age in the city was 36.5 years. 31.2% of residents were under the age of 18; 8.4% were between the ages of 18 and 24; 16.6% were from 25 to 44; 30.3% were from 45 to 64; and 13.5% were 65 years of age or older. The gender makeup of the city was 47.9% male and 52.1% female.

== Education ==
The community is served by Phillipsburg USD 325 public school district.

== Notable people ==
- Claire Windsor, film actress of the silent screen era, born here when this community was named "Marvin".

== See also ==
- Kirwin Reservoir
