= Speed, Kansas =

City in Phillips County, Kansas

- City
- Location within Phillips County and Kansas

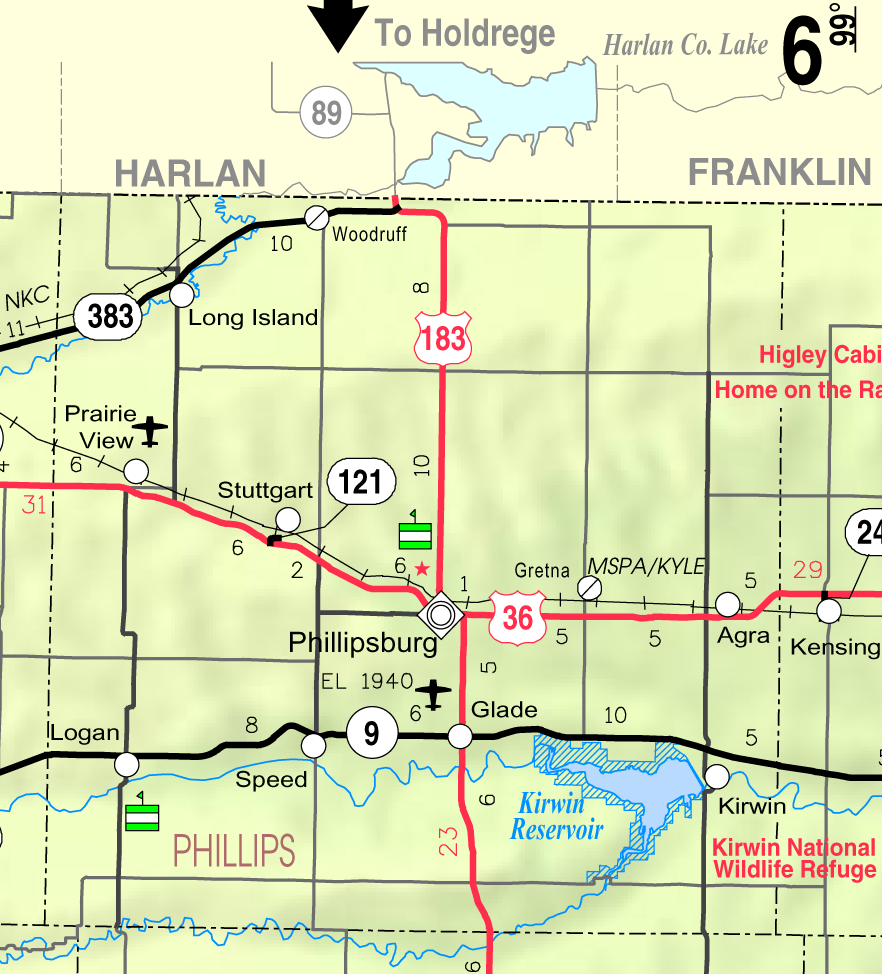
- KDOT map of Phillips County (legend)
- Coordinates: 39°40′35″N 99°25′16″W
- Country: United States
- State: Kansas
- County: Phillips
- Founded: 1890s
- Incorporated: 1928
- Named for: James Speed

Area
  - Total: 0.15 sq mi (0.39 km^{2})
  - Land: 0.15 sq mi (0.39 km^{2})
  - Water: 0 sq mi (0.00 km^{2})
- Elevation: 1,850 ft (560 m)

Population (2020)
  - Total: 37
  - Density: 250/sq mi (95/km^{2})
- Time zone: UTC-6 (CST)
  - Summer (DST): UTC-5 (CDT)
- ZIP Code: 67661
- Area code: 785
- FIPS code: 20-67175
- GNIS ID: 2395924

Speed is a city in Phillips County, Kansas, United States. As of the 2020 census, the population of the city was 37.

== History ==
A post office was opened in Speed in 1895, and remained in operation until being discontinued in 1964. The community was named for James Speed, United States Attorney General during the Lincoln and Johnson administrations.

In 2008, the Hot Wheels 40th Anniversary Cross-Country Road Trip held a special event in Speed. It was only one of six stops in the USA.

== Geography ==
According to the United States Census Bureau, the city has a total area of 0.15 square miles (0.39 km^{2}), all land.

== Demographics ==
Historical population
| Census | Pop. | Note | %± |
|---|---|---|---|
| 1930 | 139 | | — |
| 1940 | 111 | | −20.1% |
| 1950 | 70 | | −36.9% |
| 1960 | 75 | | 7.1% |
| 1970 | 58 | | −22.7% |
| 1980 | 41 | | −29.3% |
| 1990 | 64 | | 56.1% |
| 2000 | 44 | | −31.2% |
| 2010 | 37 | | −15.9% |
| 2020 | 37 | | 0.0% |
U.S. Decennial Census

=== 2010 census ===
As of the census of 2010, there were 37 people, 16 households, and 11 families residing in the city. The population density was 246.7 inhabitants per square mile (95.3/km^{2}). There were 27 housing units at an average density of 180.0 per square mile (69.5/km^{2}). The racial makeup of the city was 91.9% White and 8.1% from other races. Hispanic or Latino of any race were 8.1% of the population.

There were 16 households, of which 25.0% had children under the age of 18 living with them, 62.5% were married couples living together, 6.3% had a male householder with no wife present, and 31.3% were non-families. 25.0% of all households were made up of individuals. The average household size was 2.31 and the average family size was 2.64.

The median age in the city was 50.3 years. 24.3% of residents were under the age of 18; 2.7% were between the ages of 18 and 24; 18.9% were from 25 to 44; 40.5% were from 45 to 64; and 13.5% were 65 years of age or older. The gender makeup of the city was 56.8% male and 43.2% female.

=== 2000 census ===
As of the census of 2000, there were 44 people, 18 households, and 12 families residing in the city. The population density was 301.2 inhabitants per square mile (116.3/km^{2}). There were 27 housing units at an average density of 184.8 per square mile (71.4/km^{2}). The racial makeup of the city was 100.00% White. Hispanic or Latino of any race were 2.27% of the population.

There were 18 households, out of which 38.9% had children under the age of 18 living with them, 66.7% were married couples living together, 5.6% had a female householder with no husband present, and 27.8% were non-families. 27.8% of all households were made up of individuals, and 11.1% had someone living alone who was 65 years of age or older. The average household size was 2.44 and the average family size was 2.92.

In the city, the population was spread out, with 27.3% under the age of 18, 4.5% from 18 to 24, 29.5% from 25 to 44, 31.8% from 45 to 64, and 6.8% who were 65 years of age or older. The median age was 41 years. For every 100 females, there were 109.5 males. For every 100 females age 18 and over, there were 128.6 males.

The median income for a household in the city was $45,625, and the median income for a family was $51,250. Males had a median income of $27,083 versus $26,250 for females. The per capita income for the city was $15,031. There were no families and 2.0% of the population living below the poverty line, including no under eighteens and none of those over 64.

== Education ==
The community is served by Phillipsburg USD 325 public school district.
