= Belmont Township, Phillips County, Kansas =

Township in Phillips County, Kansas, U.S.

Belmont Township
- Township
- Location within Phillips County
- Coordinates: 39.69795°N 99.459384°W
- Country: United States
- State: Kansas
- County: Phillips

Government
  - Commissioner District #1: Douglas Zillinger

Area
  - Total: 36.086 sq mi (93.46 km^{2})
  - Land: 36.086 sq mi (93.46 km^{2})
  - Water: 0 sq mi (0 km^{2}) 0%
- Elevation: 2,015 ft (614 m)

Population (2020)
  - Total: 78
  - Density: 2.2/sq mi (0.83/km^{2})
- Time zone: UTC-6 (CST)
  - Summer (DST): UTC-5 (CDT)
- Area code: 785
- GNIS feature ID: 472027

Belmont Township is a township in Phillips County, Kansas, United States. As of the 2020 census, its population was 78.

== Geography ==
Belmont Township covers an area of 36.086 square miles (93.46 square kilometers).

=== Communities ===
- Speed

=== Adjacent townships ===
Mound Township, Phillips County
Beaver Township, Phillips County	northwest	north	northeast	Phillipsburg Township, Phillips County
Logan Township, Phillips County	west	self	east	Solomon Township, Phillips County
Towanda Township, Phillips County	southwest	south	southeast	Rushville Township, Phillips County
Plainview Township, Phillips County

== Transportation ==
=== Major highways ===
- K-9
