= Almena, Kansas =

City in Norton County, Kansas, United States

- City
- Location within Norton County and Kansas

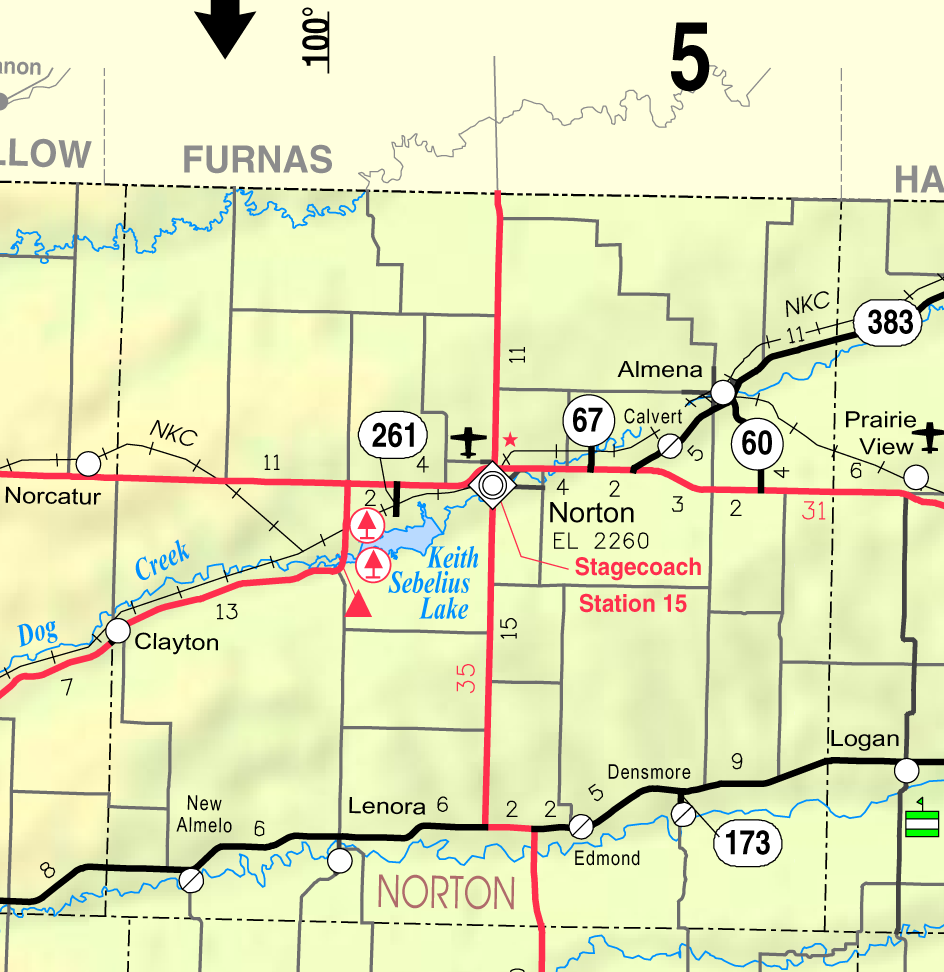
- KDOT map of Norton County (legend)
- Coordinates: 39°53′29″N 99°42′35″W
- Country: United States
- State: Kansas
- County: Norton
- Incorporated: 1893
- Named for: Almena, Wisconsin

Area
  - Total: 0.61 sq mi (1.57 km^{2})
  - Land: 0.61 sq mi (1.57 km^{2})
  - Water: 0 sq mi (0.00 km^{2})
- Elevation: 2,152 ft (656 m)

Population (2020)
  - Total: 363
  - Density: 599/sq mi (231/km^{2})
- Time zone: UTC-6 (CST)
  - Summer (DST): UTC-5 (CDT)
- ZIP Code: 67622
- Area code: 785
- FIPS code: 20-01425
- GNIS ID: 2393927
- Website: cityofalmena.com

Almena is a city in Norton County, Kansas, United States. As of the 2020 census, the population of the city was 363.

== History ==
Almena was a shipping point located at the junction of two railroads. It was named by Margaret Coleman, an early settler and first postmistress, for Almena, Wisconsin, her hometown.

The first post office in Almena was established in June 1872.

== Geography ==
According to the United States Census Bureau, the city has a total area of 0.61 square miles (1.58 km^{2}), all land.

== Demographics ==
Historical population
Census	Pop.	Note	%±
1890	366		—
1900	491		34.2%
1910	702		43.0%
1920	674		−4.0%
1930	703		4.3%
1940	543		−22.8%
1950	616		13.4%
1960	555		−9.9%
1970	489		−11.9%
1980	517		5.7%
1990	423		−18.2%
2000	469		10.9%
2010	408		−13.0%
2020	363		−11.0%
U.S. Decennial Census

=== 2020 census ===
The 2020 United States census counted 363 people, 152 households, and 85 families in Almena. The population density was 600.0 per square mile (231.7/km^{2}). There were 198 housing units at an average density of 327.3 per square mile (126.4/km^{2}). The racial makeup was 90.36% (328) white or European American (88.98% non-Hispanic white), 0.0% (0) black or African-American, 0.0% (0) Native American or Alaska Native, 0.0% (0) Asian, 0.0% (0) Pacific Islander or Native Hawaiian, 3.31% (12) from other races, and 6.34% (23) from two or more races. Hispanic or Latino of any race was 5.51% (20) of the population.

Of the 152 households, 20.4% had children under the age of 18; 44.7% were married couples living together; 23.0% had a female householder with no spouse or partner present. 36.2% of households consisted of individuals and 15.1% had someone living alone who was 65 years of age or older. The average household size was 2.4 and the average family size was 3.0. The percent of those with a bachelor's degree or higher was estimated to be 8.3% of the population.

22.3% of the population was under the age of 18, 8.3% from 18 to 24, 18.7% from 25 to 44, 27.8% from 45 to 64, and 22.9% who were 65 years of age or older. The median age was 45.6 years. For every 100 females, there were 97.3 males. For every 100 females ages 18 and older, there were 100.0 males.

The 2016–2020 5-year American Community Survey estimates show that the median household income was $44,375 (with a margin of error of +/- $16,777) and the median family income was $58,929 (+/- $19,906). Males had a median income of $37,750 (+/- $14,616) versus $20,250 (+/- $7,954) for females. The median income for those above 16 years old was $28,646 (+/- $8,818). Approximately, 7.7% of families and 11.5% of the population were below the poverty line, including 12.1% of those under the age of 18 and 15.7% of those ages 65 or over.

=== 2010 census ===
As of the census of 2010, there were 408 people, 180 households, and 102 families residing in the city. The population density was 668.9 inhabitants per square mile (258.3/km^{2}). There were 217 housing units at an average density of 355.7 per square mile (137.3/km^{2}). The racial makeup of the city was 97.5% White, 0.5% African American, 0.2% Native American, 1.5% from other races, and 0.2% from two or more races. Hispanic or Latino of any race were 2.7% of the population.

There were 180 households, of which 28.9% had children under the age of 18 living with them, 42.8% were married couples living together, 7.8% had a female householder with no husband present, 6.1% had a male householder with no wife present, and 43.3% were non-families. 38.9% of all households were made up of individuals, and 21.1% had someone living alone who was 65 years of age or older. The average household size was 2.27 and the average family size was 3.06.

The median age in the city was 41.2 years. 27.5% of residents were under the age of 18; 7.2% were between the ages of 18 and 24; 21.4% were from 25 to 44; 25.8% were from 45 to 64; and 18.1% were 65 years of age or older. The gender makeup of the city was 51.7% male and 48.3% female.

== Education ==
Almena is served by Northern Valley USD 212 public school district. The Northern Valley High School mascot is Huskies.

Grades K-4 and 9-12 are located in the Almena school building, and grades 5-8 are in the Long Island school building.

The Northern Valley Huskies have won the following KSHSAA State Championships:

- 8-Man DI Football - 1986, 1990
- 8-Man DII Football - 1987
- 1A Boys Basketball - 1986, 1990, 1991
- 1A DII Boys Basketball - 2018
- 1A Boys Track & Field - 1986, 1987, 2019
- 1A Volleyball - 1993, 2017
- 1A Girls Basketball - 1994
- 1A Cheer - 2023

Almena schools and Long Island schools formed through consolidation, their first school year was 1967–1968. The Almena High School mascot was Almena Coyotes with team colors of Orange and Black, in 1966 they were the Almena Huskies with team colors of green and white. The Long Island High School mascot was Long Island Leopards with team colors of Purple and Gold.
