= Fairfield Township, Crow Wing County, Minnesota =

Township in Minnesota, United States

Fairfield Township
- Township
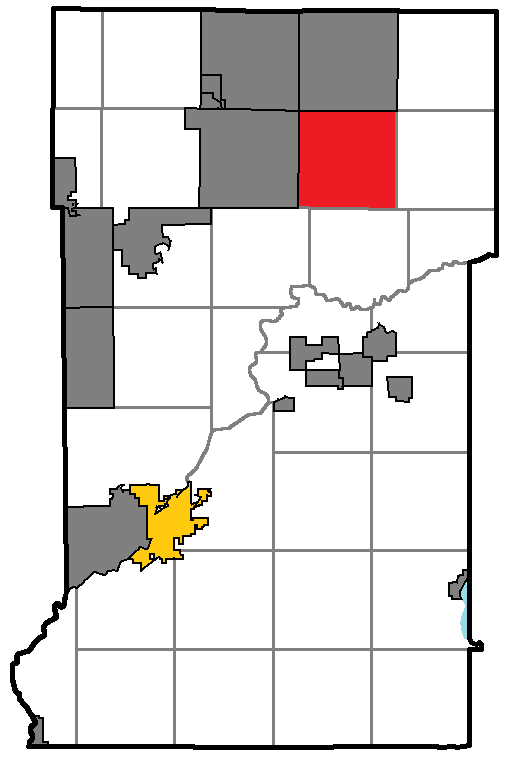
- Location of Fairfield Township, within Crow Wing County, Minnesota
- Coordinates: 46°40′25″N 93°57′50″W
- Country: United States
- State: Minnesota
- County: Crow Wing

Area
  - Total: 35.9 sq mi (93.0 km^{2})
  - Land: 33.6 sq mi (86.9 km^{2})
  - Water: 2.4 sq mi (6.1 km^{2})
- Elevation: 1,250 ft (381 m)

Population (2020)
  - Total: 317
  - Density: 9.45/sq mi (3.65/km^{2})
- Time zone: UTC-6 (Central (CST))
  - Summer (DST): UTC-5 (CDT)
- FIPS code: 27-20240
- GNIS feature ID: 0664130
- Website: https://fairfieldmn.com/

Fairfield Township is a township in Crow Wing County, Minnesota, United States. The population was 317 at the 2020 census.

== Geography ==
According to the United States Census Bureau, the township has a total area of 35.9 square miles (93 km^{2}), of which 33.5 square miles (87 km^{2}) is land and 2.4 square miles (6.2 km^{2}) (6.57%) is water.

== Demographics ==
As of the census of 2000, there were 275 people, 125 households, and 86 families residing in the township. The population density was 8.2 inhabitants per square mile (3.2/km^{2}). There were 264 housing units at an average density of 7.9 per square mile (3.1/km^{2}). The racial makeup of the township was 97.45% White, 0.73% African American, 0.36% Asian, and 1.45% from two or more races. Hispanic or Latino of any race were 1.45% of the population.

There were 125 households, out of which 15.2% had children under the age of 18 living with them, 61.6% were married couples living together, 2.4% had a female householder with no husband present, and 30.4% were non-families. 28.8% of all households were made up of individuals, and 14.4% had someone living alone who was 65 years of age or older. The average household size was 2.20 and the average family size was 2.61.

In the township the population was spread out, with 15.6% under the age of 18, 5.1% from 18 to 24, 18.9% from 25 to 44, 32.0% from 45 to 64, and 28.4% who were 65 years of age or older. The median age was 53 years. For every 100 females, there were 118.3 males. For every 100 females age 18 and over, there were 112.8 males.

The median income for a household in the township was $29,375, and the median income for a family was $40,625. Males had a median income of $42,813 versus $21,250 for females. The per capita income for the township was $16,670. About 6.1% of families and 14.6% of the population were below the poverty line, including 24.0% of those under the age of eighteen and 10.4% of those 65 or over.
