= Pioneer Township, Graham County, Kansas =

Pioneer Township
- Township
- Location in Graham County
- Coordinates: 39°32′05″N 099°40′56″W
- Country: United States
- State: Kansas
- County: Graham

Area
  - Total: 62.15 sq mi (160.96 km^{2})
  - Land: 62.14 sq mi (160.93 km^{2})
  - Water: 0.0077 sq mi (0.02 km^{2}) 0.01%
- Elevation: 2,247 ft (685 m)

Population (2020)
  - Total: 16
  - Density: 0.26/sq mi (0.099/km^{2})
- GNIS feature ID: 0472122

Pioneer Township is a township in Graham County, Kansas, United States. As of the 2020 census, its population was 16.

== Geography ==
Pioneer Township covers an area of 62.15 square miles (161.0 km^{2}) and contains no incorporated settlements. According to the USGS, it contains four cemeteries: Buchanan Brown, McFarland, Prairie Dale and Whitfield.
