= Kirwin, Kansas =

City in Phillips County, Kansas

- City
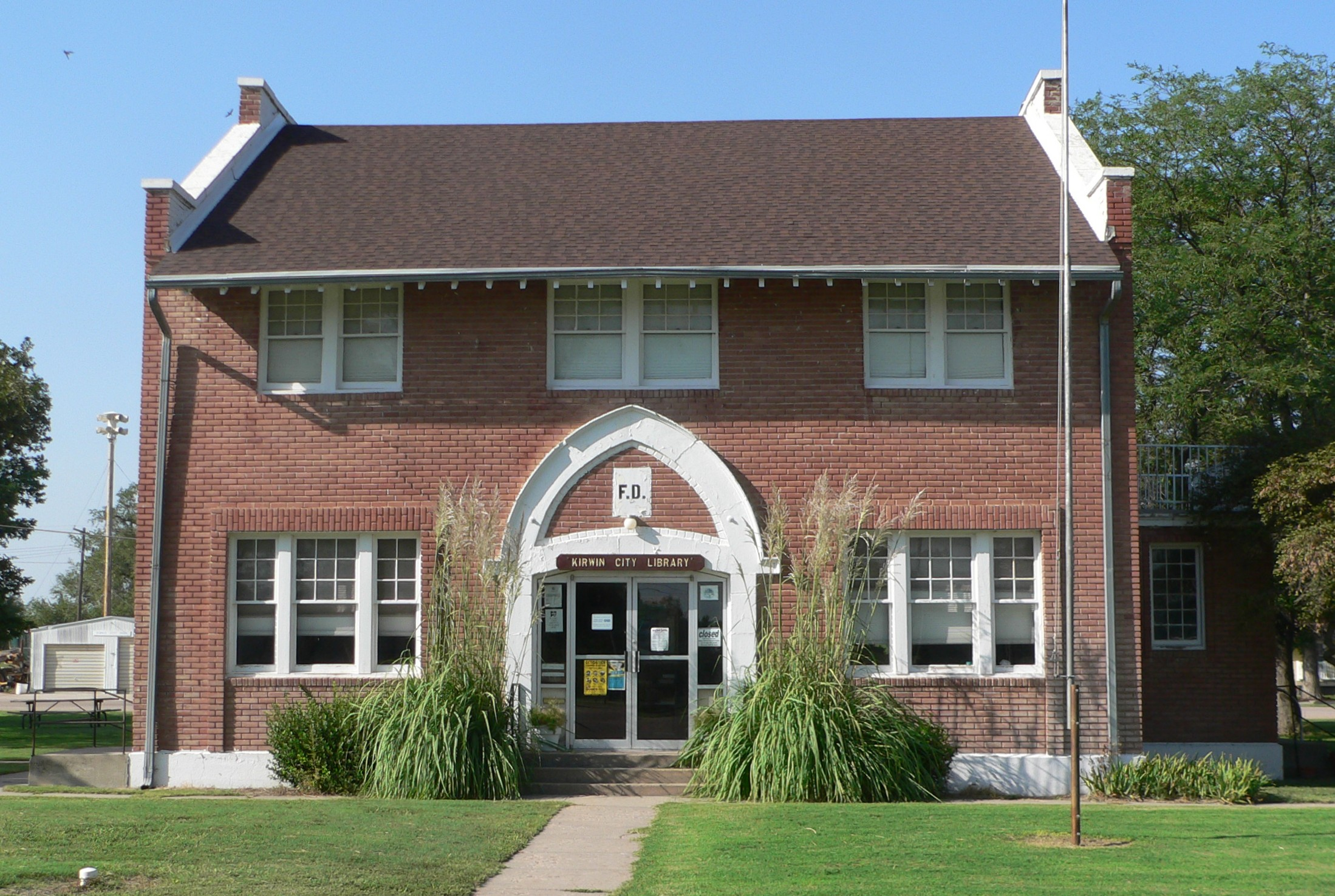
- Kirwin's city hall is listed in the National Register of Historic Places (2014)

- Location within Phillips County and Kansas

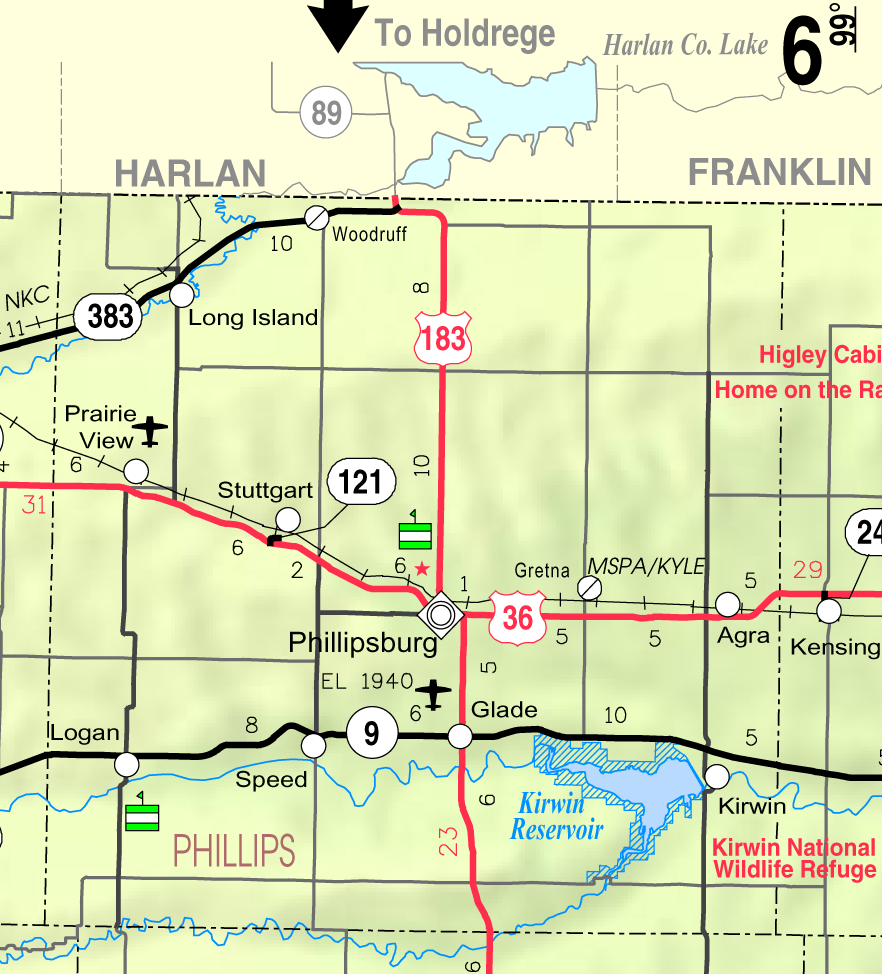
- KDOT map of Phillips County (legend)
- Coordinates: 39°40′14″N 99°07′19″W
- Country: United States
- State: Kansas
- County: Phillips
- Founded: 1869
- Incorporated: 1877
- Named for: Col. John Kirwin

Area
  - Total: 0.92 sq mi (2.37 km^{2})
  - Land: 0.92 sq mi (2.37 km^{2})
  - Water: 0 sq mi (0.00 km^{2})
- Elevation: 1,696 ft (517 m)

Population (2020)
  - Total: 139
  - Density: 152/sq mi (58.6/km^{2})
- Time zone: UTC-6 (CST)
  - Summer (DST): UTC-5 (CDT)
- ZIP Code: 67644
- Area code: 785
- FIPS code: 20-37275
- GNIS ID: 2395551

Kirwin is a city in Phillips County, Kansas, United States. As of the 2020 census, the population of the city was 139.

== History ==
Kirwin was founded in 1869. It was named for Col. John Kirwin, who commanded a stockade at the town site. Kirwin was incorporated as a city in 1880.

Kirwin was located on the Missouri Pacific Railroad.

== Geography ==
According to the United States Census Bureau, the city has a total area of 0.99 square miles (2.56 km^{2}), of which 0.96 square miles (2.49 km^{2}) is land and 0.03 square miles (0.08 km^{2}) is water.

== Demographics ==
Historical population
Census	Pop.	Note	%±
1880	807		—
1890	689		−14.6%
1900	586		−14.9%
1910	626		6.8%
1920	553		−11.7%
1930	500		−9.6%
1940	392		−21.6%
1950	374		−4.6%
1960	356		−4.8%
1970	293		−17.7%
1980	249		−15.0%
1990	269		8.0%
2000	229		−14.9%
2010	171		−25.3%
2020	139		−18.7%
U.S. Decennial Census

=== 2020 census ===
The 2020 United States census counted 139 people, 65 households, and 43 families in Kirwin. The population density was 151.9 per square mile (58.7/km^{2}). There were 123 housing units at an average density of 134.4 per square mile (51.9/km^{2}). The racial makeup was 84.89% (118) white or European American (84.17% non-Hispanic white), 0.0% (0) black or African-American, 2.16% (3) Native American or Alaska Native, 0.0% (0) Asian, 0.0% (0) Pacific Islander or Native Hawaiian, 0.0% (0) from other races, and 12.95% (18) from two or more races. Hispanic or Latino of any race was 1.44% (2) of the population.

Of the 65 households, 32.3% had children under the age of 18; 49.2% were married couples living together; 13.8% had a female householder with no spouse or partner present. 24.6% of households consisted of individuals and 9.2% had someone living alone who was 65 years of age or older. The average household size was 2.5 and the average family size was 3.1. The percent of those with a bachelor's degree or higher was estimated to be 12.2% of the population.

23.0% of the population was under the age of 18, 3.6% from 18 to 24, 23.0% from 25 to 44, 29.5% from 45 to 64, and 20.9% who were 65 years of age or older. The median age was 45.3 years. For every 100 females, there were 93.1 males. For every 100 females ages 18 and older, there were 91.1 males.

The 2016–2020 5-year American Community Survey estimates show that the median household income was $41,750 (with a margin of error of +/- $14,468) and the median family income was $53,929 (+/- $4,896). Males had a median income of $33,750 (+/- $13,564) versus $11,250 (+/- $9,642) for females. The median income for those above 16 years old was $27,344 (+/- $7,289). Approximately, 0.0% of families and 7.5% of the population were below the poverty line, including 0.0% of those under the age of 18 and 0.0% of those ages 65 or over.

=== 2010 census ===
As of the census of 2010, there were 171 people, 87 households, and 42 families residing in the city. The population density was 178.1 inhabitants per square mile (68.8/km^{2}). There were 163 housing units at an average density of 169.8 per square mile (65.6/km^{2}). The racial makeup of the city was 92.4% White, 0.6% African American, 4.1% Native American, 1.2% from other races, and 1.8% from two or more races. Hispanic or Latino of any race were 2.9% of the population.

There were 87 households, of which 18.4% had children under the age of 18 living with them, 40.2% were married couples living together, 5.7% had a female householder with no husband present, 2.3% had a male householder with no wife present, and 51.7% were non-families. 43.7% of all households were made up of individuals, and 19.5% had someone living alone who was 65 years of age or older. The average household size was 1.97 and the average family size was 2.69.

The median age in the city was 46.8 years. 18.7% of residents were under the age of 18; 8.2% were between the ages of 18 and 24; 17.5% were from 25 to 44; 34.4% were from 45 to 64; and 21.1% were 65 years of age or older. The gender makeup of the city was 52.0% male and 48.0% female.

== Education ==
The community is served by Thunder Ridge USD 110 public school district, where schools are located in Kensington and Agra. In 2008 West Smith County USD 238 and Eastern Heights USD 324 combined to form Thunder Ridge USD 110. The Thunder Ridge High School mascot is Thunder Ridge Longhorns.

Kirwin schools were closed through school unification. The Kirwin High School mascot was Kirwin Wildcats.

== Parks and Recreation ==
- Kirwin Reservoir
