= Fairfield Township, Swift County, Minnesota =

Fairfield Township, Minnesota
- Township
- Location within the state of Minnesota Fairfield Township, Minnesota (the United States)
- Coordinates: 45°22′21″N 95°56′19″W
- Country: United States
- State: Minnesota
- County: Swift

Area
  - Total: 36.0 sq mi (93.2 km^{2})
  - Land: 35.9 sq mi (93.0 km^{2})
  - Water: 0.077 sq mi (0.2 km^{2})
- Elevation: 1,050 ft (320 m)

Population (2000)
  - Total: 169
  - Density: 4.7/sq mi (1.8/km^{2})
- Time zone: UTC-6 (Central (CST))
  - Summer (DST): UTC-5 (CDT)
- FIPS code: 27-20258
- GNIS feature ID: 0664131

Fairfield Township is a township in Swift County, Minnesota, United States. The population was 169 at the 2000 census.

Fairfield Township was organized in 1872.

== Geography ==
According to the United States Census Bureau, the township has a total area of 36.0 square miles (93 km^{2}), of which 35.9 square miles (93 km^{2}) is land and 0.1 square miles (0.26 km^{2}) (0.22%) is water.

== Demographics ==
As of the census of 2000, there were 169 people, 57 households, and 47 families residing in the township. The population density was 4.7 inhabitants per square mile (1.8/km^{2}). There were 63 housing units at an average density of 1.8 per square mile (0.69/km^{2}). The racial makeup of the township was 100.00% White.

There were 57 households, out of which 36.8% had children under the age of 18 living with them, 82.5% were married couples living together, and 15.8% were non-families. 14.0% of all households were made up of individuals, and 5.3% had someone living alone who was 65 years of age or older. The average household size was 2.96 and the average family size was 3.25.

In the township the population was spread out, with 34.9% under the age of 18, 3.0% from 18 to 24, 27.2% from 25 to 44, 21.9% from 45 to 64, and 13.0% who were 65 years of age or older. The median age was 39 years. For every 100 females, there were 119.5 males. For every 100 females age 18 and over, there were 111.5 males.

The median income for a household in the township was $38,750, and the median income for a family was $41,875. Males had a median income of $26,250 versus $26,250 for females. The per capita income for the township was $15,387. About 5.9% of families and 11.7% of the population were below the poverty line, including 10.4% of those under the age of eighteen and 17.9% of those 65 or over.
