= Republican City Township, Harlan County, Nebraska =

Republican City Township
- Township
- Location in Harlan County
- Coordinates: 40°02′31″N 099°13′58″W
- Country: United States
- State: Nebraska
- County: Harlan

Area
  - Total: 36.0 sq mi (93.3 km^{2})
  - Land: 26.09 sq mi (67.57 km^{2})
  - Water: 9.93 sq mi (25.72 km^{2}) 27.57%
- Elevation: 1,975 ft (602 m)

Population (2000)
  - Total: 129
  - Density: 4.9/sq mi (1.9/km^{2})
- ZIP code: 68971
- Area code: 308
- GNIS feature ID: 0838208

Republican City Township is one of sixteen townships in Harlan County, Nebraska, United States. The population was 129 at the 2000 census. A 2006 estimate placed the township's population at 117. The village of Republican City is less than a mile north of the township.

== See also ==
- County government in Nebraska
