= Kirwin National Wildlife Refuge =

Protected area in Kansas, United States

- IUCN category IV (habitat/species management area)
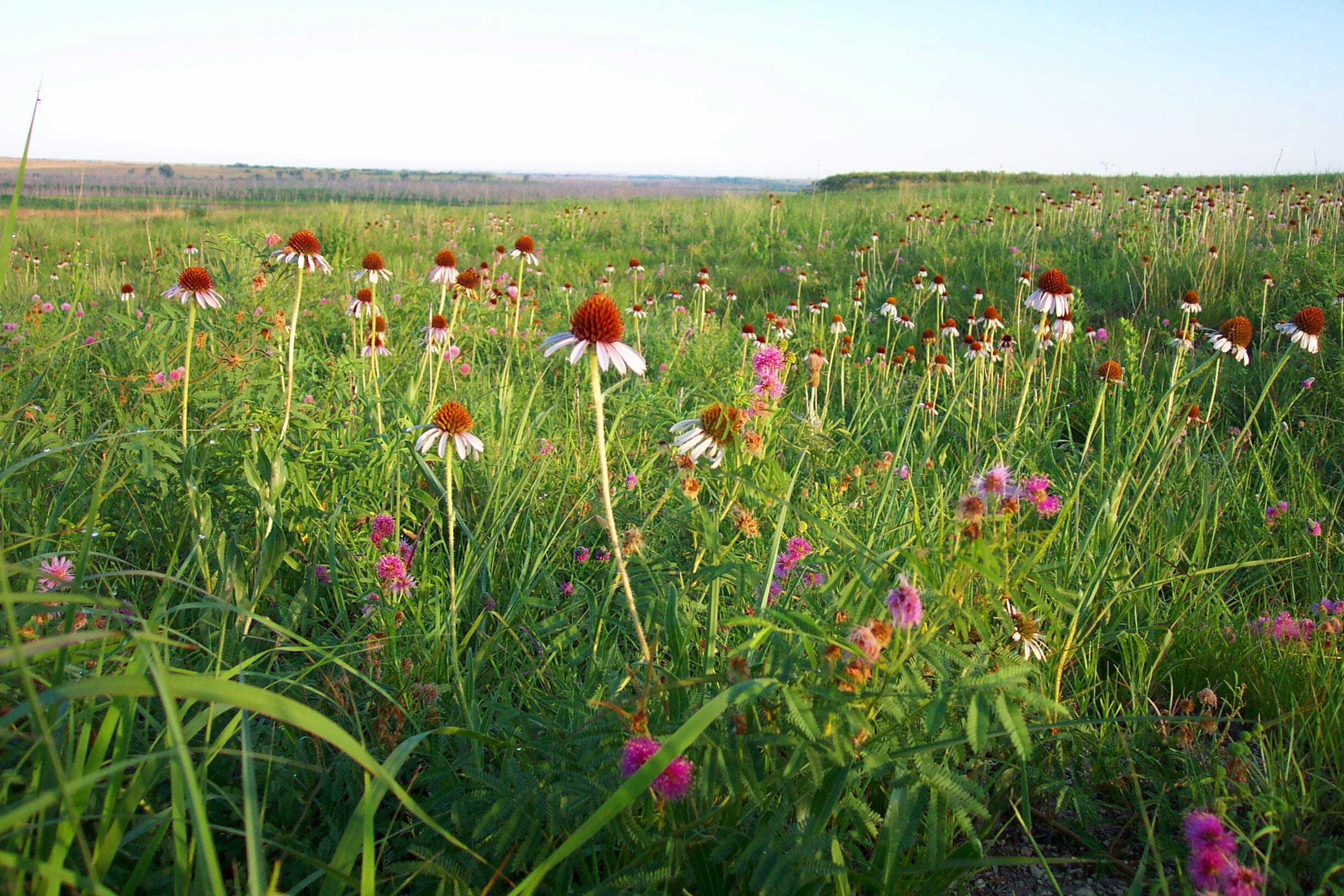

- Location within the United States
- Location: Phillips County, Kansas, United States
- Nearest city: Kirwin, Kansas
- Coordinates: 39°38′30″N 99°11′00″W
- Area: 10,778 acres (43.62 km^{2})
- Established: 1954
- Governing body: U.S. Fish and Wildlife Service
- Website: Kirwin National Wildlife Refuge

Kirwin National Wildlife Refuge is a National Wildlife Refuge of the United States located in Kansas. It was established in 1954 for the conservation and management of wildlife resources, particularly migratory birds.

The Kirwin Dam was built in the early 1950s near Kirwin, Kansas, and the reservoir created in the process provides water to the refuge.

== Ecology ==
The refuge is located along the North Fork of the Solomon River in the region where tallgrass prairie meets shortgrass prairie on the Great Plains. This merging of grassland types brings a diversity of flora and fauna to the area. Other habitat types include wetlands and cropland. More than 300 species of birds, mammals, reptiles, amphibians, and fish inhabit the refuge.

Four federally listed and two state-listed threatened and endangered species of birds can be observed. Twenty-eight other birds of conservation concern use the refuge during their annual migrations, and nine nest there. In ideal conditions, up to a million ducks and geese aggregate there. Large numbers of shorebirds migrate through the refuge in late summer. Hundreds of great blue herons and double-crested cormorants nest in the flooded timber, and interior least terns nest when the water is lower. Populations of greater prairie chickens and black-tailed prairie dogs occur on the refuge.

== Recreation ==
Recreational activities include car tours, wildlife observation, boating, fishing, hiking, hunting, and educational programs. There is a visitor center and a museum.
