= Prairie Dog Township, Harlan County, Nebraska =

Prairie Dog Township
- Township
- Location in Harlan County
- Coordinates: 40°02′26″N 099°21′03″W
- Country: United States
- State: Nebraska
- County: Harlan

Area
  - Total: 35.93 sq mi (93.05 km^{2})
  - Land: 26.29 sq mi (68.09 km^{2})
  - Water: 9.64 sq mi (24.96 km^{2}) 26.82%
- Elevation: 2,057 ft (627 m)

Population (2000)
  - Total: 42
  - Density: 1.6/sq mi (0.6/km^{2})
- ZIP code: 68920
- Area code: 308
- GNIS feature ID: 0838201

Prairie Dog Township is one of sixteen townships in Harlan County, Nebraska, United States. The population was 42 at the 2000 census. A 2006 estimate placed the township's population at 39.

== See also ==
- County government in Nebraska
