= Kirwin Reservoir =

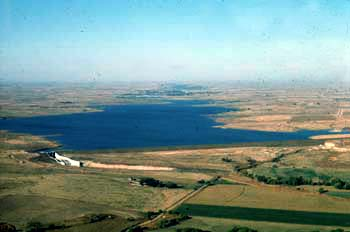
- Aerial view of Kirwin Reservoir

- Location within Kansas Location within the United States

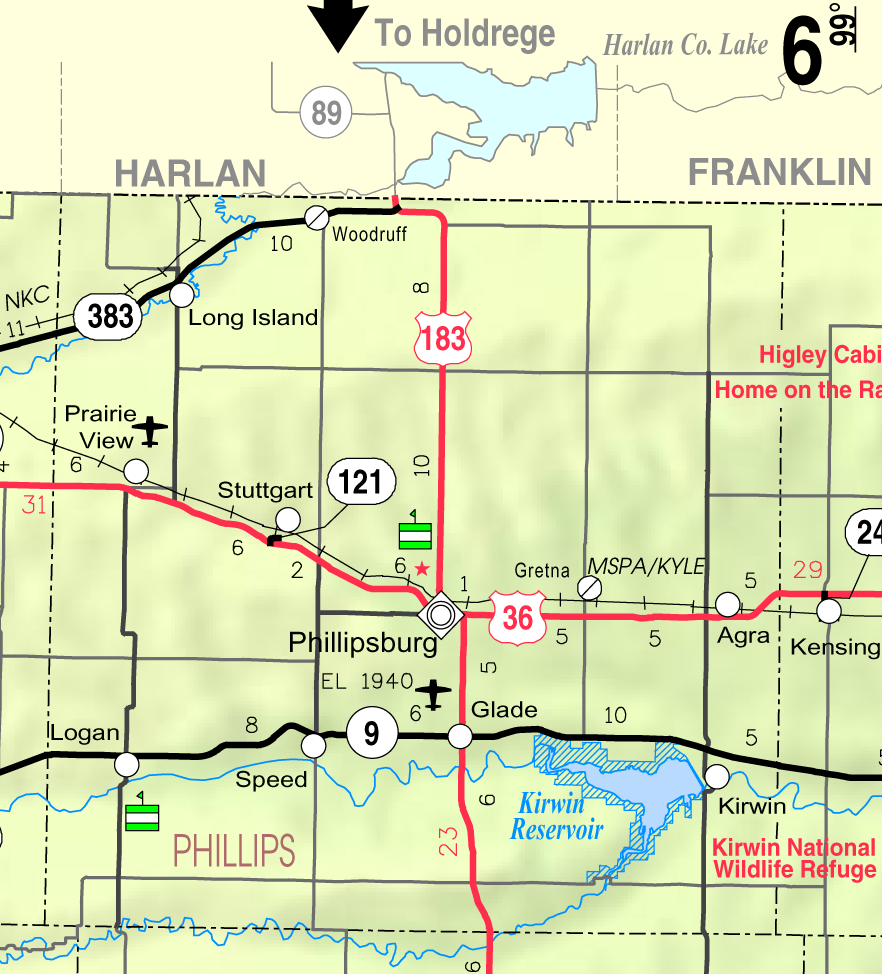
- KDOT map of Phillips County (legend)
- Location: Phillips County, Kansas
- Coordinates: 39°39′22″N 99°09′40″W
- Type: Reservoir
- Primary inflows: North Fork Solomon River, Bow Creek
- Primary outflows: North Fork Solomon River
- Catchment area: 1,367 sq mi (3,540 km^{2})
- Basin countries: United States
- Managing agency: U.S. Bureau of Reclamation
- Built: March 1952
- First flooded: October 1955
- Max. length: 9 miles (14 km)
- Surface area: 5,079 acres (20.55 km^{2})
- Max. depth: 49 feet (15 m)
- Water volume: Full: 98,154 acre⋅ft (121,071,000 m^{3}); Current (Nov. 2015): 34,199 acre⋅ft (42,184,000 m^{3})
- Shore length^{1}: 37 miles (60 km)
- Surface elevation: Full: 1,729 ft (527 m); Current (Nov. 2015): 1,713 ft (522 m)
- Settlements: Kirwin, Glade
- ^{1} Shore length is not a well-defined measure.

Kirwin Reservoir is a reservoir in Phillips County, Kansas, United States. It is located next to the city of Kirwin in northern Kansas. The U.S. Bureau of Reclamation built it and continues to operate it for the purposes of flood control and area irrigation. The Kirwin National Wildlife Refuge lies on its shores.

== History ==
Following the agricultural devastation of the Dust Bowl during the 1930s, local residents and state officials advocated for construction of a dam in the Solomon River basin to create a reservoir for irrigation. The U.S. Bureau of Reclamation began investigating potential sites in 1939. The Flood Control Act of 1944 authorized construction of Kirwin Dam and Reservoir as part of the Pick-Sloan Missouri Basin Program, but World War II and its aftermath delayed the effort.

Kirwin Irrigation District No. 1 organized in 1950. A massive flood of the entire Kansas River basin stoked public demand for flood control infrastructure. In response, the U.S. Congress passed an appropriation act directing the immediate construction of Kirwin Dam and Reservoir for flood control, but allowing for further study before starting irrigation operations. Construction of Kirwin Dam began in March 1952 and lasted until completion of the project in August 1955. Storage of water in the reservoir began in October 1955. The next month, contractors started building Kirwin Canal and its extensions east of the dam, finishing construction in January 1958.

Kirwin National Wildlife Refuge was established in 1954 as an overlay project on the flood control and irrigation efforts at the site. The first such national refuge in Kansas, it was created to conserve and manage local wildlife, specifically migratory birds.

== Geography ==
Kirwin Reservoir is located at 39°39′22″N 99°09′40″W (39.6560352, -99.1609843) at an elevation of 1,729 feet (527 m). It lies in northern Kansas in the Smoky Hills region of the Great Plains. The reservoir is located entirely within Phillips County.

The reservoir is impounded at its eastern end by Kirwin Dam. The dam is located at 39°39′30″N 99°07′26″W (39.6583439, -99.1239777) at an elevation of 1,752 feet (534 m). The North Fork Solomon River and Bow Creek are the reservoir's primary inflows; the North Fork Solomon is also its primary outflow.

Kansas Highway 9 runs generally east-west north of the reservoir. East 1100 Road, a paved county road, runs generally north-south immediately east of the reservoir.

There is one settlement at the reservoir: Kirwin, Kansas, located immediately below the dam.

== Hydrography ==
The surface area, surface elevation, and water volume of the reservoir fluctuate based on inflow and local climatic conditions. In terms of capacity, the Bureau of Reclamation vertically divides the reservoir into a set of pools based on volume and water level, and it considers the reservoir full when filled to the capacity of its active conservation pool. When full, Kirwin Reservoir has a surface area of 5,079 acres (20.55 km^{2}), a surface elevation of 1,729 feet (527 m), and a volume of 98,154 acre⋅ft (121,071,000 m^{3}). When filled to maximum capacity, it has a surface area of 14,660 acres (59.3 km^{2}), a surface elevation of 1,773 feet (540 m), and a volume of 511,757 acre⋅ft (631,243,000 m^{3}).

The streambed underlying the reservoir has an elevation of 1,662 feet (507 m). Since the reservoir's initial flooding, sedimentation has gradually accumulated on the reservoir bottom thus raising its elevation.

== Infrastructure ==
Kirwin Dam is a rolled earth-fill embankment dam with a structural height of 169 feet (52 m) and a length of 12,646 feet (3,855 m). At its crest, the dam has an elevation of 1,779 feet (542 m). A concrete spillway controlled by 15 gated sluiceways is located at the south end of the dam. It empties into a short channel which joins the North Fork Solomon River east of the dam. Outlet works through the dam, including a stilling well, empty directly into the river and the Kirwin Main Canal. When the reservoir is at maximum water surface elevation, the spillway has a discharge capacity of 96,000 cu ft/s (2,700 m^{3}/s). The canal outlet has a discharge capacity of 175 cu ft/s (5.0 m^{3}/s), and the river outlet has a capacity of 100 cu ft/s (2.8 m^{3}/s).

The Kirwin Main Canal extends east from the dam for 13.4 miles (21.6 km) on the north side of the river. It then branches into the Kirwin North Canal, which continues for another 14.3 miles (23.0 km), and the Kirwin South Canal, which crosses the river in a siphon and continues along its south side for another 16.3 miles (26.2 km). 38 miles (61 km) of lateral canals extend outward from all three central canals. The entire network provides irrigation to 11,435 acres (46.28 km^{2}) of land.

== Management ==
The U.S. Bureau of Reclamation operates and maintains Kirwin Dam and Reservoir. The local irrigation authority, Kirwin Irrigation District No. 1, operates and maintains the canals, laterals, and drains. The U.S. Fish and Wildlife Service administers the reservoir surface and most of the surrounding land as the Kirwin National Wildlife Refuge.

== Recreation ==
Kirwin Reservoir is open for sport fishing year-round. The Fish and Wildlife Service permits hunting for waterfowl and upland game during appropriate seasons.

== Wildlife ==
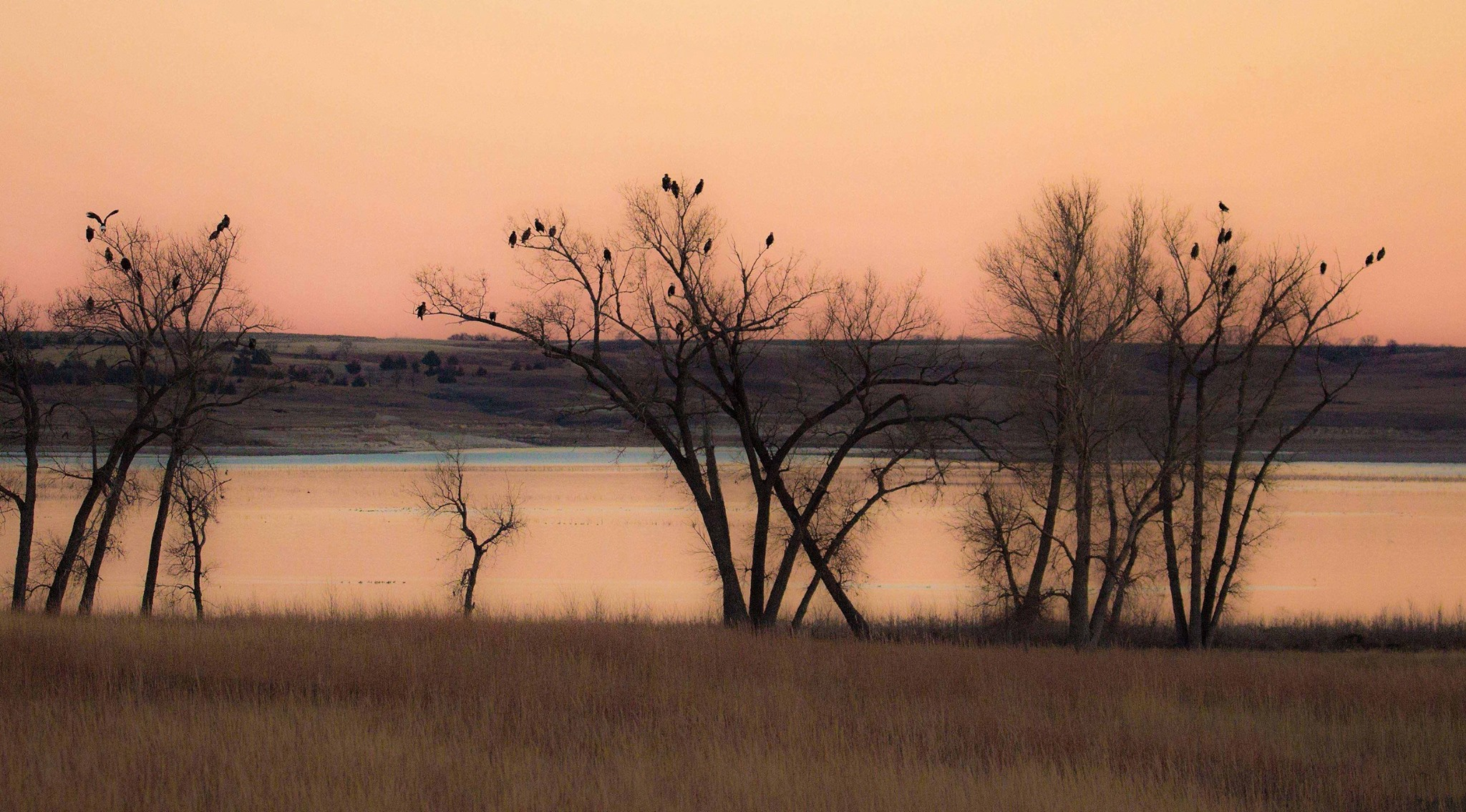
Bald eagles in trees at Kirwin Reservoir

Fish species resident in Kirwin Reservoir include black crappie, channel catfish, largemouth and smallmouth bass, walleye, and wiper. The surrounding wildlife refuge is home to a broad variety of animals including mule and white-tailed deer, hawks, owls, pheasants, prairie chickens, bobwhite quail, and Rio Grande turkeys. During the winter, the area hosts populations of both bald and golden eagles. In addition, Kirwin serves as a staging point for water birds such as cormorants and pelicans.

A remote portion of the refuge serves as a Research Natural Area consisting of bluestem and grama prairie grasses.

== See also ==
- List of Kansas state parks
- List of lakes, reservoirs, and dams in Kansas
- List of rivers of Kansas
