= Phillips County, Kansas =

County in Kansas, United States

- County
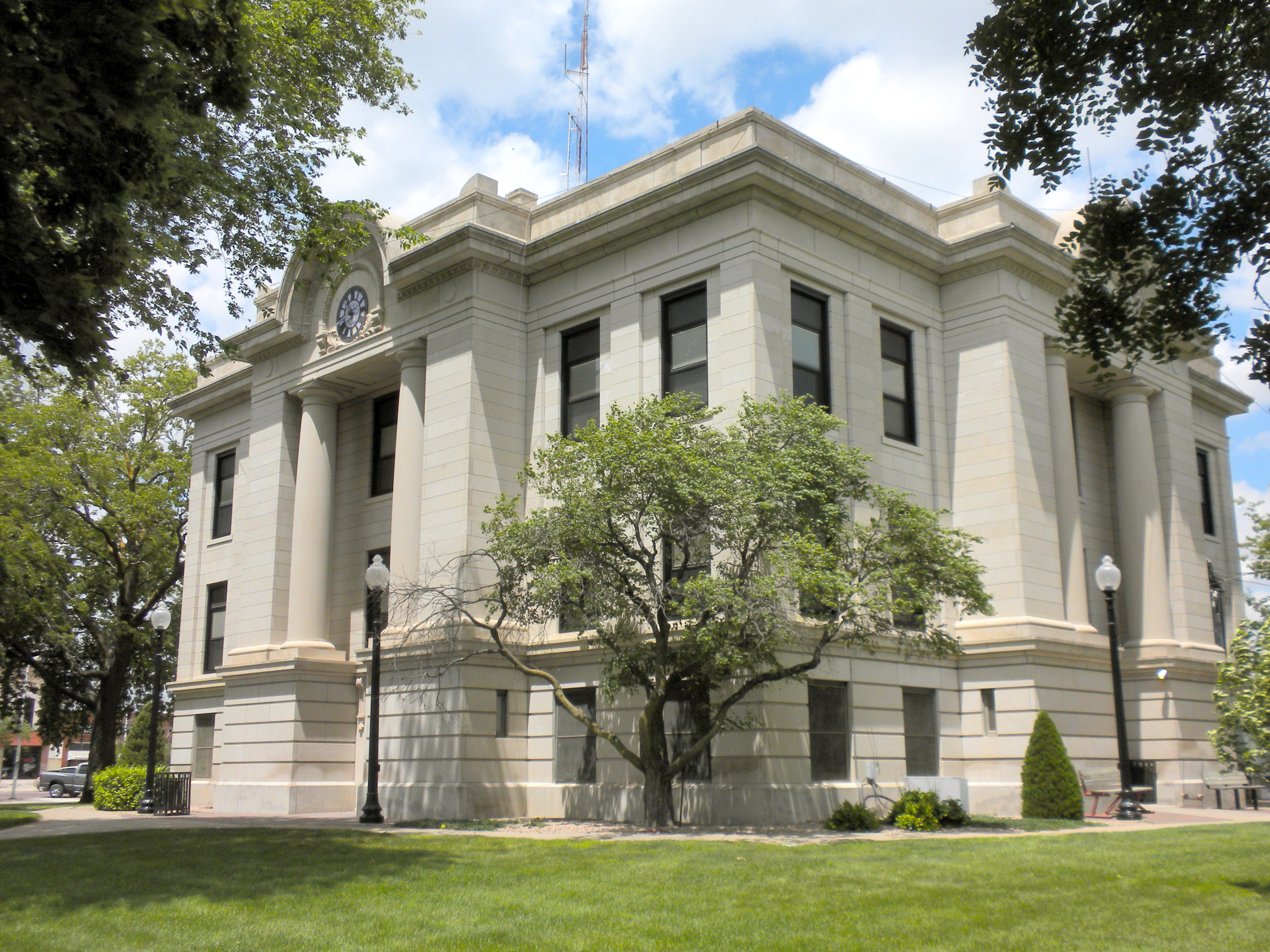
- Phillips County Courthouse in Phillipsburg (2010)

- Location within the U.S. state of Kansas
- Coordinates: 39°48′N 99°21′W
- Country: United States
- State: Kansas
- Founded: February 26, 1867
- Named for: William A. Phillips
- Seat: Phillipsburg
- Largest city: Phillipsburg

Area
  - Total: 895 sq mi (2,320 km^{2})
  - Land: 886 sq mi (2,290 km^{2})
  - Water: 8.7 sq mi (23 km^{2}) 1.0%

Population (2020)
  - Total: 4,981
  - Estimate (2025): 4,728 ▼
  - Density: 5.62/sq mi (2.17/km^{2})
- Time zone: UTC−6 (Central)
  - Summer (DST): UTC−5 (CDT)
- Area code: 785
- Congressional district: 1st
- Website: phillipscountyks.org

Phillips County is a county located in the U.S. state of Kansas. Its county seat and largest city is Phillipsburg. As of the 2020 census, the county population was 4,981. The county was named after William Phillips, a free-state abolition journalist and colonel in the American Civil War.

== History ==
=== Early history ===
For many millennia, the Great Plains of North America was inhabited by nomadic Native Americans. From the 16th century to 18th century, the Kingdom of France claimed ownership of large parts of North America. In 1762, after the French and Indian War, France secretly ceded New France to Spain, per the Treaty of Fontainebleau.

=== 19th century ===
In 1802, Spain returned most of the land to France, but keeping title to about 7,500 square miles. In 1803, most of the land for modern day Kansas was acquired by the United States from France as part of the 828,000 square mile Louisiana Purchase for 2.83 cents per acre.

In 1854, the Kansas Territory was organized, then in 1861 Kansas became the 34th U.S. state. In 1867, Phillips County was established.

== Geography ==
According to the U.S. Census Bureau, the county has a total area of 895 square miles (2,320 km^{2}), of which 886 square miles (2,290 km^{2}) is land and 8.7 square miles (23 km^{2}) (1.0%) is water.

=== Adjacent counties ===
- Harlan County, Nebraska (north)
- Franklin County, Nebraska (northeast)
- Smith County (east)
- Rooks County (south)
- Graham County (southwest)
- Norton County (west)

=== National protected area ===
- Kirwin National Wildlife Refuge

== Demographics ==
Historical population
Census	Pop.	Note	%±
1880	12,014		—
1890	13,661		13.7%
1900	14,442		5.7%
1910	14,150		−2.0%
1920	12,505		−11.6%
1930	12,159		−2.8%
1940	10,435		−14.2%
1950	9,273		−11.1%
1960	8,709		−6.1%
1970	7,888		−9.4%
1980	7,406		−6.1%
1990	6,590		−11.0%
2000	6,001		−8.9%
2010	5,642		−6.0%
2020	4,981		−11.7%
2025 (est.)	4,728	▼	−5.1%
U.S. Decennial Census; 1790-1960 1900-1990; 1990-2000 2010-2020

=== 2020 census ===
As of the 2020 census, the county had a population of 4,981. The median age was 46.6 years. 22.3% of residents were under the age of 18 and 25.7% of residents were 65 years of age or older. For every 100 females there were 102.6 males, and for every 100 females age 18 and over there were 99.7 males age 18 and over.

The racial makeup of the county was 94.0% White, 0.4% Black or African American, 0.4% American Indian and Alaska Native, 0.3% Asian, 0.0% Native Hawaiian and Pacific Islander, 0.5% from some other race, and 4.3% from two or more races. Hispanic or Latino residents of any race comprised 2.9% of the population.

0.0% of residents lived in urban areas, while 100.0% lived in rural areas.

There were 2,200 households in the county, of which 24.9% had children under the age of 18 living with them and 21.4% had a female householder with no spouse or partner present. About 33.7% of all households were made up of individuals and 17.3% had someone living alone who was 65 years of age or older.

There were 2,794 housing units, of which 21.3% were vacant. Among occupied housing units, 77.1% were owner-occupied and 22.9% were renter-occupied. The homeowner vacancy rate was 1.7% and the rental vacancy rate was 14.6%.

=== 2000 census ===
As of the census of 2000, there were 6,001 people, 2,496 households, and 1,722 families residing in the county. The population density was 7 people per square mile (2.7 people/km^{2}). There were 3,088 housing units at an average density of 4 per square mile (1.5/km^{2}). The racial makeup of the county was 98.25% White, 0.25% Black or African American, 0.30% Native American, 0.45% Asian, 0.03% from other races, and 0.72% from two or more races. 0.67% of the population were Hispanic or Latino of any race.

There were 2,496 households, out of which 28.30% had children under the age of 18 living with them, 61.50% were married couples living together, 5.50% had a female householder with no husband present, and 31.00% were non-families. 28.60% of all households were made up of individuals, and 15.80% had someone living alone who was 65 years of age or older. The average household size was 2.35 and the average family size was 2.89.

In the county, the population was spread out, with 24.50% under the age of 18, 5.70% from 18 to 24, 23.20% from 25 to 44, 24.80% from 45 to 64, and 21.80% who were 65 years of age or older. The median age was 42 years. For every 100 females there were 94.80 males. For every 100 females age 18 and over, there were 91.20 males.

The median income for a household in the county was $35,013, and the median income for a family was $41,638. Males had a median income of $29,609 versus $17,827 for females. The per capita income for the county was $17,121. About 7.20% of families and 10.00% of the population were below the poverty line, including 11.60% of those under age 18 and 8.80% of those age 65 or over.

== Government ==
=== Presidential elections ===
Presidential election results

United States presidential election results for Phillips County, Kansas
Year	Republican		Democratic		Third party(ies)	
Year	No.	%	No.	%	No.	%
1888	1,681	53.86%	763	24.45%	677	21.69%
1892	1,352	47.79%	0	0.00%	1,477	52.21%
1896	1,374	47.23%	1,507	51.80%	28	0.96%
1900	1,691	52.26%	1,511	46.69%	34	1.05%
1904	2,147	66.41%	811	25.09%	275	8.51%
1908	1,762	52.25%	1,490	44.19%	120	3.56%
1912	594	18.71%	1,257	39.59%	1,324	41.70%
1916	2,271	41.84%	2,912	53.65%	245	4.51%
1920	2,862	68.60%	1,230	29.48%	80	1.92%
1924	2,647	54.97%	1,376	28.58%	792	16.45%
1928	3,206	69.77%	1,332	28.99%	57	1.24%
1932	2,165	40.64%	3,007	56.45%	155	2.91%
1936	3,193	59.59%	2,154	40.20%	11	0.21%
1940	3,676	69.49%	1,563	29.55%	51	0.96%
1944	3,053	72.74%	1,098	26.16%	46	1.10%
1948	2,715	66.32%	1,223	29.87%	156	3.81%
1952	3,713	80.18%	884	19.09%	34	0.73%
1956	3,117	75.49%	985	23.86%	27	0.65%
1960	3,123	75.34%	1,004	24.22%	18	0.43%
1964	2,164	54.10%	1,804	45.10%	32	0.80%
1968	2,567	68.29%	844	22.45%	348	9.26%
1972	2,919	76.15%	827	21.58%	87	2.27%
1976	2,317	63.05%	1,264	34.39%	94	2.56%
1980	2,731	74.48%	748	20.40%	188	5.13%
1984	2,813	80.90%	626	18.00%	38	1.09%
1988	2,316	69.86%	960	28.96%	39	1.18%
1992	1,579	46.61%	843	24.88%	966	28.51%
1996	2,005	66.30%	758	25.07%	261	8.63%
2000	2,057	73.67%	611	21.88%	124	4.44%
2004	2,256	79.24%	557	19.56%	34	1.19%
2008	2,105	78.93%	525	19.69%	37	1.39%
2012	2,135	83.24%	382	14.89%	48	1.87%
2016	2,233	83.82%	300	11.26%	131	4.92%
2020	2,418	86.95%	318	11.43%	45	1.62%
2024	2,356	85.77%	331	12.05%	60	2.18%

Phillips County is overwhelmingly Republican. No Democratic presidential candidate has won Phillips County since Franklin D. Roosevelt in 1932, and since 1940 only two Democrats have obtained thirty percent of the county's vote: Lyndon Johnson in 1964 and Jimmy Carter in 1976.

=== Laws ===
Following amendment to the Kansas Constitution in 1986, the county remained a prohibition, or "dry", county until 1996, when voters approved the sale of alcoholic liquor by the individual drink with a 30 percent food sales requirement.

== Education ==
=== Unified school districts ===
- Thunder Ridge USD 110
  - Agra and small eastern portion of county; extends into western third of Smith County
- Northern Valley USD 212
  - Long Island and northwestern corner of county; extends into northeastern Norton County
- Phillipsburg USD 325
  - city of Phillipsburg and areas near and along US 183
- Logan USD 326
  - southwestern corner of county along and south of K-9; extends into southeastern Norton County

== Communities ==
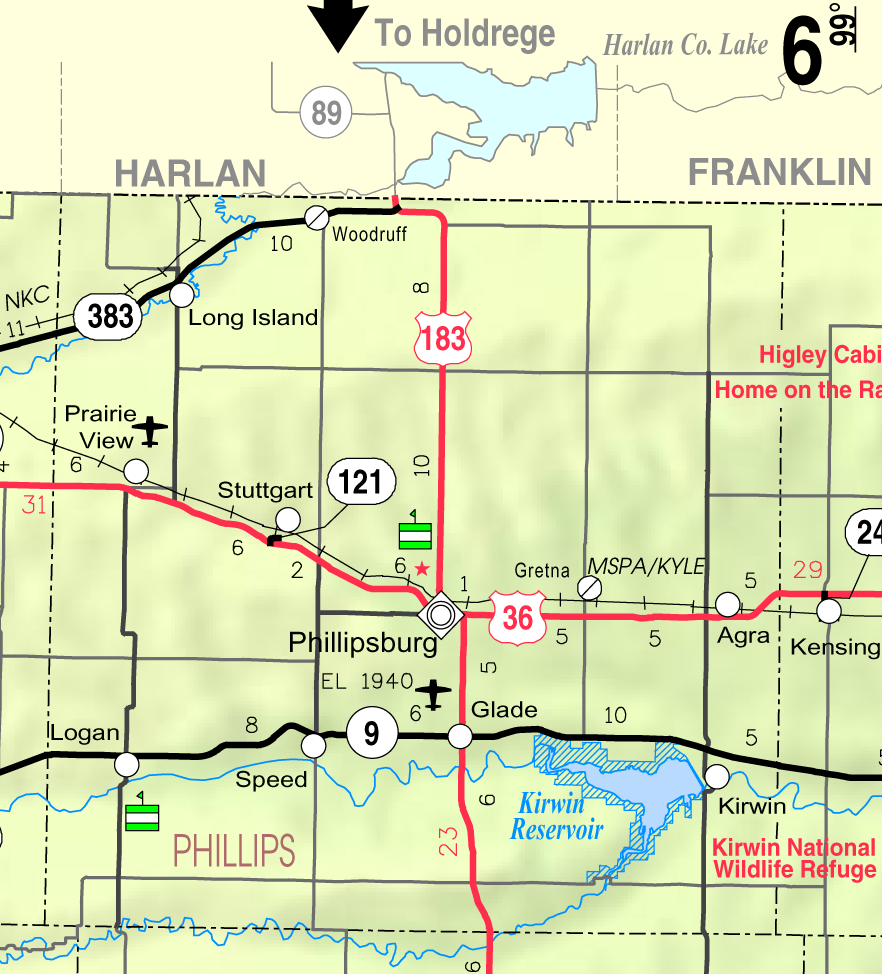
2005 map of Phillips County (map legend)

List of townships / incorporated cities / unincorporated communities / extinct former communities within Phillips County.

=== Cities ===
- Agra
- Glade
- Kirwin
- Logan
- Long Island
- Phillipsburg (county seat)
- Prairie View
- Speed

=== Unincorporated communities ===
† means a community is designated a Census-Designated Place (CDP) by the United States Census Bureau.

- Gretna
- Stuttgart†
- Woodruff†

=== Ghost towns ===
- Crow
- Dickeyville
- Goode
- Jimtown
- Luctor
- Matteson
- Myrtle
- Pleasant Green
- Powell
- Wagnerville
- West Cedar

=== Townships ===
Phillips County is divided into twenty-five townships. The city of Phillipsburg is considered governmentally independent and is excluded from the census figures for the townships. In the following table, the population center is the largest city (or cities) included in that township's population total, if it is of a significant size.

Sources: 2000 U.S. Gazetteer from the U.S. Census Bureau.
Township	FIPS	Population center	Population	Population density /km^{2} (/sq mi)	Land area km^{2} (sq mi)	Water area km^{2} (sq mi)	Water %	Geographic coordinates
Arcade	02150		96	1 (3)	92 (36)	0 (0)	0.03%	39°46′30″N 99°13′40″W
Beaver	05100		54	1 (2)	93 (36)	0 (0)	0.05%	39°47′22″N 99°33′43″W
Belmont	05700		113	1 (3)	93 (36)	0 (0)	0%	39°41′26″N 99°27′13″W
Bow Creek	08075		44	0 (1)	92 (35)	1 (1)	1.49%	39°36′15″N 99°13′31″W
Crystal	16550		59	1 (2)	92 (36)	0 (0)	0.19%	39°51′55″N 99°6′35″W
Dayton	17100		53	1 (1)	92 (36)	0 (0)	0.10%	39°53′27″N 99°27′15″W
Deer Creek	17200		67	1 (2)	88 (34)	5 (2)	4.87%	39°41′2″N 99°13′54″W
Freedom	24650		85	1 (2)	92 (36)	0 (0)	0.10%	39°52′18″N 99°21′40″W
Glenwood	26650		42	0 (1)	92 (36)	0 (0)	0.21%	39°57′38″N 99°14′25″W
Granite	27450		21	0 (1)	92 (36)	0 (0)	0.14%	39°58′6″N 99°28′11″W
Greenwood	28775		45	0 (1)	92 (36)	0 (0)	0.05%	39°51′51″N 99°14′24″W
Kirwin	37300		307	4 (9)	87 (33)	6 (2)	6.89%	39°40′51″N 99°7′24″W
Logan	42125		666	7 (19)	93 (36)	0 (0)	0.03%	39°40′3″N 99°34′11″W
Long Island	42625		251	3 (7)	91 (35)	0 (0)	0.12%	39°56′35″N 99°33′16″W
Mound	48725		129	1 (4)	93 (36)	0 (0)	0%	39°47′13″N 99°27′7″W
Phillipsburg	55700		257	3 (7)	89 (34)	0 (0)	0.01%	39°46′15″N 99°20′28″W
Plainview	56125		23	0 (1)	93 (36)	0 (0)	0.01%	39°35′21″N 99°27′1″W
Plum	56775		447	5 (12)	93 (36)	0 (0)	0.27%	39°46′3″N 99°7′6″W
Prairie View	57550		220	2 (6)	92 (36)	0 (0)	0.13%	39°51′0″N 99°34′38″W
Rushville	61800		23	0 (1)	93 (36)	0 (0)	0%	39°36′40″N 99°21′35″W
Solomon	66350		226	2 (6)	92 (36)	0 (0)	0.05%	39°41′27″N 99°20′12″W
Sumner	69175		43	0 (1)	92 (35)	0 (0)	0.18%	39°57′6″N 99°6′50″W
Towanda	71175		26	0 (1)	93 (36)	0 (0)	0.20%	39°36′13″N 99°33′43″W
Valley	73025		22	0 (1)	85 (33)	8 (3)	8.70%	39°36′58″N 99°8′3″W
Walnut	75075		14	0 (0)	93 (36)	0 (0)	0.09%	39°57′33″N 99°20′47″W

== See also ==
- National Register of Historic Places listings in Phillips County, Kansas

Community information for Kansas

- Kansas locations by per capita income
- List of counties in Kansas
- List of townships in Kansas
- List of cities in Kansas
- List of unincorporated communities in Kansas
- List of ghost towns in Kansas
- West Cedar, Kansas
