= Fairfield Township, Harlan County, Nebraska =

Fairfield Township
- Township
- Location in Harlan County
- Coordinates: 40°02′27″N 099°34′04″W
- Country: United States
- State: Nebraska
- County: Harlan

Area
  - Total: 35.49 sq mi (91.92 km^{2})
  - Land: 35.49 sq mi (91.92 km^{2})
  - Water: 0 sq mi (0 km^{2}) 0%
- Elevation: 2,215 ft (675 m)

Population (2000)
  - Total: 61
  - Density: 1.8/sq mi (0.7/km^{2})
- GNIS feature ID: 0838000

Fairfield Township is one of sixteen townships in Harlan County, Nebraska, United States. The population was 61 at the 2000 census. A 2006 estimate placed the township's population at 56.
