= Eldorado Township, Harlan County, Nebraska =

Eldorado Township
- Township
- Location in Harlan County
- Coordinates: 40°02′49″N 099°27′28″W
- Country: United States
- State: Nebraska
- County: Harlan

Area
  - Total: 36.07 sq mi (93.41 km^{2})
  - Land: 36.06 sq mi (93.39 km^{2})
  - Water: 0.012 sq mi (0.03 km^{2}) 0.03%
- Elevation: 2,110 ft (643 m)

Population (2000)
  - Total: 68
  - Density: 1.8/sq mi (0.7/km^{2})
- GNIS feature ID: 0837978

Eldorado Township is one of sixteen townships in Harlan County, Nebraska, United States. The population was 68 at the 2000 census. A 2006 estimate placed the township's population at 63.

== See also ==
- County government in Nebraska
