= List of cities in Kansas =

Map of the United States with Kansas highlighted

Kansas is a state located in the Midwestern United States. As of the 2020 census, 2,937,880 of the 2,970,606 residents of Kansas lived in a city in the 2024 estimate.

Kansas is the 34th-most populous state with 2,970,606 inhabitants but the 13th-largest by land area spanning 81,758.72 square miles (211,754.1 km^{2}) of land. Kansas is divided into 105 counties and contains 626 municipalities, all known as cities.

== City requirements ==
All incorporated communities in Kansas are called cities, unlike in some states where some are called towns or villages (11 of 50 states only have cities).

Once a city is incorporated in Kansas, it will continue to be a city even after falling below the minimum required to become a city, and even if the minimum is later raised. A city can disincorporate, but if citizens decide to reincorporate at a later date, then new minimum requirements must be met.

By State law, cities in Kansas are divided into three classes.

- Cities of the 3rd Class - When a city incorporates, it becomes a city of the 3rd class. To incorporate, a city must generally have either 300 inhabitants or 300 or more platted lots served by water and sewer lines. This minimum requirement has increased since older historical minimum requirements.
- Cities of the 2nd Class - A city may petition to become a city of the 2nd class when its population is more than 2,000 but less than 15,000. A city whose population is between 2,000 and 15,000 may elect to remain a city of the 3rd class, but must become a city of the 2nd class when it reaches 15,000 population.
- Cities of the 1st Class - A city may petition to become a city of the 1st class when its population reaches 15,000. A city whose population is between 15,000 and 25,000 may elect to remain a city of the 2nd class but must become a city of the 1st class when it reaches 25,000 population.

== Cities ==
County seat
State capital and county seat

| 2024 rank | City | Primary county | Secondary county(ies) | Land area (2025) | Population density (2024) | Population | | |
| 2024 rank | City | Primary county | Secondary county(ies) | Land area (2025) | Population density (2024) | 2024 Estimate | 2020 census | 2020–2024 Change |
|---|---|---|---|---|---|---|---|---|
| 1 | Wichita | Sedgwick | | 165.074 square miles (427.54 km^{2}) | 2,429.159/sq mi (937.904/km^{2}) | 400,991 | 397,532 | +0.87% |
| 2 | Overland Park | Johnson | | 75.280 square miles (194.97 km^{2}) | 2,695.178/sq mi (1,040.614/km^{2}) | 202,893 | 197,238 | +2.87% |
| 3 | Kansas City | Wyandotte | | 124.737 square miles (323.07 km^{2}) | 1,256.660/sq mi (485.199/km^{2}) | 156,752 | 156,607 | +0.09% |
| 4 | Olathe | Johnson | | 64.669 square miles (167.49 km^{2}) | 2,304.582/sq mi (889.804/km^{2}) | 149,035 | 141,290 | +5.48% |
| 5 | Topeka | Shawnee | | 61.897 square miles (160.31 km^{2}) | 2,027.029/sq mi (782.640/km^{2}) | 125,467 | 126,587 | −0.88% |
| 6 | Lawrence | Douglas | | 34.559 square miles (89.51 km^{2}) | 2,814.64/sq mi (1,086.737/km^{2}) | 97,271 | 94,934 | +2.46% |
| 7 | Shawnee | Johnson | | 41.975 square miles (108.71 km^{2}) | 1,661.08/sq mi (641.348/km^{2}) | 69,724 | 67,311 | +3.58% |
| 8 | Lenexa | Johnson | | 34.082 square miles (88.27 km^{2}) | 1,743.65/sq mi (673.226/km^{2}) | 59,427 | 57,434 | +3.47% |
| 9 | Manhattan | Riley | Pottawatomie | 20.390 square miles (52.81 km^{2}) | 2,682.7/sq mi (1,035.8/km^{2}) | 54,700 | 54,100 | +1.11% |
| 10 | Salina | Saline | | 26.291 square miles (68.09 km^{2}) | 1,753.79/sq mi (677.144/km^{2}) | 46,109 | 46,889 | −1.66% |
| 11 | Hutchinson | Reno | | 25.426 square miles (65.85 km^{2}) | 1,555.93/sq mi (600.747/km^{2}) | 39,561 | 40,006 | −1.11% |
| 12 | Leavenworth | Leavenworth | | 24.350 square miles (63.07 km^{2}) | 1,534.70/sq mi (592.55/km^{2}) | 37,370 | 37,351 | +0.05% |
| 13 | Leawood | Johnson | | 15.107 square miles (39.13 km^{2}) | 2,251.47/sq mi (869.30/km^{2}) | 34,013 | 33,902 | +0.33% |
| 14 | Garden City | Finney | | 11.205 square miles (29.02 km^{2}) | 2,498.53/sq mi (964.69/km^{2}) | 27,996 | 28,151 | −0.55% |
| 15 | Dodge City | Ford | | 15.013 square miles (38.88 km^{2}) | 1,842.60/sq mi (711.43/km^{2}) | 27,663 | 27,788 | −0.45% |
| 16 | Derby | Sedgwick | | 11.108 square miles (28.77 km^{2}) | 2,395.03/sq mi (924.73/km^{2}) | 26,604 | 25,625 | +3.82% |
| 17 | Gardner | Johnson | | 14.909 square miles (38.61 km^{2}) | 1,732.91/sq mi (669.08/km^{2}) | 25,836 | 23,287 | +10.95% |
| 18 | Emporia | Lyon | | 12.371 square miles (32.04 km^{2}) | 1,968.64/sq mi (760.09/km^{2}) | 24,354 | 24,139 | +0.89% |
| 19 | Prairie Village | Johnson | | 6.211 square miles (16.09 km^{2}) | 3,690.1/sq mi (1,424.74/km^{2}) | 22,919 | 22,957 | −0.17% |
| 20 | Junction City | Geary | | 11.546 square miles (29.90 km^{2}) | 1,910.01/sq mi (737.46/km^{2}) | 22,053 | 22,932 | −3.83% |
| 21 | Hays | Ellis | | 8.742 square miles (22.64 km^{2}) | 2,426.56/sq mi (936.90/km^{2}) | 21,213 | 21,116 | +0.46% |
| 22 | Pittsburg | Crawford | | 13.457 square miles (34.85 km^{2}) | 1,526.86/sq mi (589.53/km^{2}) | 20,547 | 20,646 | −0.48% |
| 23 | Liberal | Seward | | 12.027 square miles (31.15 km^{2}) | 1,595.08/sq mi (615.86/km^{2}) | 19,184 | 19,825 | −3.23% |
| 24 | Newton | Harvey | | 14.844 square miles (38.45 km^{2}) | 1,234.2/sq mi (476.52/km^{2}) | 18,320 | 18,602 | −1.52% |
| 25 | Andover | Butler | | 11.009 square miles (28.51 km^{2}) | 1,540/sq mi (596/km^{2}) | 17,000 | 14,892 | +14.16% |
| 26 | Great Bend | Barton | | 10.527 square miles (27.26 km^{2}) | 1,358.98/sq mi (524.71/km^{2}) | 14,306 | 14,733 | −2.90% |
| 27 | McPherson | McPherson | | 8.188 square miles (21.21 km^{2}) | 1,718.12/sq mi (663.37/km^{2}) | 14,068 | 14,082 | −0.10% |
| 28 | Ottawa | Franklin | | 10.662 square miles (27.61 km^{2}) | 1,194.24/sq mi (461.10/km^{2}) | 12,733 | 12,625 | +0.86% |
| 29 | El Dorado | Butler | | 9.952 square miles (25.78 km^{2}) | 1,275.52/sq mi (492.48/km^{2}) | 12,694 | 12,870 | −1.37% |
| 30 | Arkansas City | Cowley | | 9.488 square miles (24.57 km^{2}) | 1,239.57/sq mi (478.60/km^{2}) | 11,761 | 11,974 | −1.78% |
| 31 | Winfield | Cowley | | 11.144 square miles (28.86 km^{2}) | 1,047.92/sq mi (404.60/km^{2}) | 11,678 | 11,777 | −0.84% |
| 32 | Merriam | Johnson | | 4.317 square miles (11.18 km^{2}) | 2,677.8/sq mi (1,033.9/km^{2}) | 11,560 | 11,098 | +4.16% |
| 33 | Haysville | Sedgwick | | 4.809 square miles (12.46 km^{2}) | 2,371.8/sq mi (915.76/km^{2}) | 11,406 | 11,262 | +1.28% |
| 34 | Lansing | Leavenworth | | 12.300 square miles (31.86 km^{2}) | 920.00/sq mi (355.214/km^{2}) | 11,316 | 11,239 | +0.69% |
| 35 | Atchison | Atchison | | 8.016 square miles (20.76 km^{2}) | 1,348.93/sq mi (520.82/km^{2}) | 10,813 | 10,885 | −0.66% |
| 36 | Spring Hill | Johnson | Miami | 9.948 square miles (25.77 km^{2}) | 1,012.3/sq mi (390.84/km^{2}) | 10,070 | 7,952 | +26.63% |
| 37 | Bel Aire | Sedgwick | | 7.042 square miles (18.24 km^{2}) | 1,429.42/sq mi (551.90/km^{2}) | 10,066 | 8,262 | +21.83% |
| 38 | Mission | Johnson | | 2.668 square miles (6.91 km^{2}) | 3,753.0/sq mi (1,449.0/km^{2}) | 10,013 | 9,954 | +0.59% |
| 39 | Parsons | Labette | | 10.631 square miles (27.53 km^{2}) | 877.43/sq mi (338.78/km^{2}) | 9,328 | 9,600 | −2.83% |
| 40 | Park City | Sedgwick | | 10.228 square miles (26.49 km^{2}) | 890.7/sq mi (343.90/km^{2}) | 9,110 | 8,333 | +9.32% |
| 41 | Augusta | Butler | | 4.250 square miles (11.01 km^{2}) | 2,141.9/sq mi (826.99/km^{2}) | 9,103 | 9,256 | −1.65% |
| 42 | Coffeyville | Montgomery | | 9.627 square miles (24.93 km^{2}) | 887.61/sq mi (342.71/km^{2}) | 8,545 | 8,826 | −3.18% |
| 43 | Chanute | Neosho | | 7.101 square miles (18.39 km^{2}) | 1,202.08/sq mi (464.13/km^{2}) | 8,536 | 8,722 | −2.13% |
| 44 | Independence | Montgomery | | 7.500 square miles (19.42 km^{2}) | 1,104.93/sq mi (426.62/km^{2}) | 8,287 | 8,548 | −3.05% |
| 45 | Basehor | Leavenworth | | 7.144 square miles (18.50 km^{2}) | 1,119.26/sq mi (432.15/km^{2}) | 7,996 | 6,896 | +15.95% |
| 46 | Bonner Springs | Wyandotte | Johnson, Leavenworth | 15.629 square miles (40.48 km^{2}) | 501.12/sq mi (193.483/km^{2}) | 7,832 | 7,837 | −0.06% |
| 47 | Fort Scott | Bourbon | | 5.583 square miles (14.46 km^{2}) | 1,354.65/sq mi (523.03/km^{2}) | 7,563 | 7,552 | +0.15% |
| 48 | Wellington | Sumner | | 7.618 square miles (19.73 km^{2}) | 992.52/sq mi (383.21/km^{2}) | 7,561 | 7,715 | −2.00% |
| 49 | Valley Center | Sedgwick | | 8.101 square miles (20.98 km^{2}) | 915.44/sq mi (353.45/km^{2}) | 7,416 | 7,340 | +1.04% |
| 50 | Maize | Sedgwick | | 10.056 square miles (26.04 km^{2}) | 701.97/sq mi (271.03/km^{2}) | 7,059 | 5,735 | +23.09% |
| 51 | Mulvane | Sumner | Sedgwick | 4.286 square miles (11.10 km^{2}) | 1,636.96/sq mi (632.03/km^{2}) | 7,016 | 6,286 | +11.61% |
| 52 | Roeland Park | Johnson | | 1.620 square miles (4.20 km^{2}) | 4,129.0/sq mi (1,594.2/km^{2}) | 6,689 | 6,871 | −2.65% |
| 53 | Pratt | Pratt | | 7.723 square miles (20.00 km^{2}) | 852.91/sq mi (329.31/km^{2}) | 6,587 | 6,603 | −0.24% |
| 54 | De Soto | Johnson | Leavenworth | 25.670 square miles (66.48 km^{2}) | 256.291/sq mi (98.955/km^{2}) | 6,579 | 6,118 | +7.54% |
| 55 | Eudora | Douglas | | 3.353 square miles (8.68 km^{2}) | 1,957.6/sq mi (755.85/km^{2}) | 6,564 | 6,408 | +2.43% |
| 56 | Abilene | Dickinson | | 4.830 square miles (12.51 km^{2}) | 1,345.96/sq mi (519.68/km^{2}) | 6,501 | 6,460 | +0.63% |
| 57 | Tonganoxie | Leavenworth | | 4.063 square miles (10.52 km^{2}) | 1,524.74/sq mi (588.70/km^{2}) | 6,195 | 5,573 | +11.16% |
| 58 | Goddard | Sedgwick | | 5.642 square miles (14.61 km^{2}) | 1,065.05/sq mi (411.22/km^{2}) | 6,009 | 5,084 | +18.19% |
| 59 | Paola | Miami | | 5.299 square miles (13.72 km^{2}) | 1,101.15/sq mi (425.16/km^{2}) | 5,835 | 5,768 | +1.16% |
| 60 | Ulysses | Grant | | 3.228 square miles (8.36 km^{2}) | 1,729.2/sq mi (667.66/km^{2}) | 5,582 | 5,788 | −3.56% |
| 61 | Colby | Thomas | | 3.717 square miles (9.63 km^{2}) | 1,490.2/sq mi (575.36/km^{2}) | 5,539 | 5,570 | −0.56% |
| 62 | Iola | Allen | | 4.644 square miles (12.03 km^{2}) | 1,143.20/sq mi (441.39/km^{2}) | 5,309 | 5,396 | −1.61% |
| 63 | Louisburg | Miami | | 4.879 square miles (12.64 km^{2}) | 1,079.32/sq mi (416.73/km^{2}) | 5,266 | 4,969 | +5.98% |
| 64 | Baldwin City | Douglas | | 2.959 square miles (7.66 km^{2}) | 1,684.7/sq mi (650.46/km^{2}) | 4,985 | 4,826 | +3.29% |
| 65 | Concordia | Cloud | | 4.507 square miles (11.67 km^{2}) | 1,092.97/sq mi (422.00/km^{2}) | 4,926 | 5,111 | −3.62% |
| 66 | Wamego | Pottawatomie | Wabaunsee | 2.637 square miles (6.83 km^{2}) | 1,853.6/sq mi (715.69/km^{2}) | 4,888 | 4,841 | +0.97% |
| 67 | Edwardsville | Wyandotte | | 9.038 square miles (23.41 km^{2}) | 525.34/sq mi (202.83/km^{2}) | 4,748 | 4,717 | +0.66% |
| 68 | Goodland | Sherman | | 4.500 square miles (11.65 km^{2}) | 976.44/sq mi (377.01/km^{2}) | 4,394 | 4,465 | −1.59% |
| 69 | Russell | Russell | | 4.857 square miles (12.58 km^{2}) | 890.47/sq mi (343.81/km^{2}) | 4,325 | 4,401 | −1.73% |
| 70 | Rose Hill | Butler | | 2.254 square miles (5.84 km^{2}) | 1,903.3/sq mi (734.9/km^{2}) | 4,290 | 4,185 | +2.51% |
| 71 | Osawatomie | Miami | | 5.156 square miles (13.35 km^{2}) | 812.06/sq mi (313.54/km^{2}) | 4,187 | 4,255 | −1.60% |
| 72 | Fairway | Johnson | | 1.129 square miles (2.92 km^{2}) | 3,685/sq mi (1,422.7/km^{2}) | 4,160 | 4,170 | −0.24% |
| 73 | Clay Center | Clay | | 3.191 square miles (8.26 km^{2}) | 1,275.5/sq mi (492.5/km^{2}) | 4,070 | 4,199 | −3.07% |
| 74 | Scott City | Scott | | 2.713 square miles (7.03 km^{2}) | 1,448.2/sq mi (559.16/km^{2}) | 3,929 | 4,113 | −4.47% |
| 75 | Baxter Springs | Cherokee | | 3.149 square miles (8.16 km^{2}) | 1,220.7/sq mi (471.32/km^{2}) | 3,844 | 3,888 | −1.13% |
| 76 | Lindsborg | McPherson | | 1.833 square miles (4.75 km^{2}) | 2,092.2/sq mi (807.8/km^{2}) | 3,835 | 3,776 | +1.56% |
| 77 | Larned | Pawnee | | 2.410 square miles (6.24 km^{2}) | 1,492.9/sq mi (576.43/km^{2}) | 3,598 | 3,769 | −4.54% |
| 78 | Hugoton | Stevens | | 2.095 square miles (5.43 km^{2}) | 1,710.3/sq mi (660.34/km^{2}) | 3,583 | 3,747 | −4.38% |
| 79 | Mission Hills | Johnson | | 2.039 square miles (5.28 km^{2}) | 1,726.8/sq mi (666.73/km^{2}) | 3,521 | 3,594 | −2.03% |
| 80 | Lyons | Rice | | 2.654 square miles (6.87 km^{2}) | 1,318.4/sq mi (509.03/km^{2}) | 3,499 | 3,611 | −3.10% |
| 81 | Hesston | Harvey | | 3.564 square miles (9.23 km^{2}) | 976.99/sq mi (377.22/km^{2}) | 3,482 | 3,505 | −0.66% |
| 82 | Holton | Jackson | | 2.676 square miles (6.93 km^{2}) | 1,278.8/sq mi (493.74/km^{2}) | 3,422 | 3,401 | +0.62% |
| 83 | Marysville | Marshall | | 4.562 square miles (11.82 km^{2}) | 750.11/sq mi (289.62/km^{2}) | 3,422 | 3,447 | −0.73% |
| 84 | Frontenac | Crawford | | 5.320 square miles (13.78 km^{2}) | 641.35/sq mi (247.63/km^{2}) | 3,412 | 3,382 | +0.89% |
| 85 | Beloit | Mitchell | | 3.920 square miles (10.15 km^{2}) | 867/sq mi (335/km^{2}) | 3,400 | 3,404 | −0.12% |
| 86 | Garnett | Anderson | | 3.082 square miles (7.98 km^{2}) | 1,041.9/sq mi (402.26/km^{2}) | 3,211 | 3,242 | −0.96% |
| 87 | Hiawatha | Brown | | 2.612 square miles (6.77 km^{2}) | 1,201.0/sq mi (463.71/km^{2}) | 3,137 | 3,280 | −4.36% |
| 88 | Ellsworth | Ellsworth | | 2.708 square miles (7.01 km^{2}) | 1,150.7/sq mi (444.27/km^{2}) | 3,116 | 3,066 | +1.63% |
| 89 | Columbus | Cherokee | | 2.433 square miles (6.30 km^{2}) | 1,182.9/sq mi (456.72/km^{2}) | 2,878 | 2,929 | −1.74% |
| 90 | Kingman | Kingman | | 3.591 square miles (9.30 km^{2}) | 798.11/sq mi (308.15/km^{2}) | 2,866 | 3,105 | −7.70% |
| 91 | Osage City | Osage | | 3.149 square miles (8.16 km^{2}) | 888.85/sq mi (343.19/km^{2}) | 2,799 | 2,861 | −2.17% |
| 92 | St. Marys | Pottawatomie | | 1.184 square miles (3.07 km^{2}) | 2,351.4/sq mi (907.9/km^{2}) | 2,784 | 2,759 | +0.91% |
| 93 | Galena | Cherokee | | 4.603 square miles (11.92 km^{2}) | 601.13/sq mi (232.10/km^{2}) | 2,767 | 2,761 | +0.22% |
| 94 | Clearwater | Sedgwick | | 2.079 square miles (5.38 km^{2}) | 1,297.3/sq mi (500.87/km^{2}) | 2,697 | 2,653 | +1.66% |
| 95 | Norton | Norton | | 1.908 square miles (4.94 km^{2}) | 1,405.1/sq mi (542.53/km^{2}) | 2,681 | 2,747 | −2.40% |
| 96 | Hillsboro | Marion | | 2.440 square miles (6.32 km^{2}) | 1,095.5/sq mi (422.97/km^{2}) | 2,673 | 2,732 | −2.16% |
| 97 | Hoisington | Barton | | 1.160 square miles (3.00 km^{2}) | 2,247.4/sq mi (867.7/km^{2}) | 2,607 | 2,699 | −3.41% |
| 98 | Burlington | Coffey | | 2.251 square miles (5.83 km^{2}) | 1,153.3/sq mi (445.28/km^{2}) | 2,596 | 2,634 | −1.44% |
| 99 | South Hutchinson | Reno | | 2.843 square miles (7.36 km^{2}) | 881.5/sq mi (340.33/km^{2}) | 2,506 | 2,521 | −0.60% |
| 100 | Sabetha | Nemaha | Brown | 3.331 square miles (8.63 km^{2}) | 743.32/sq mi (287.00/km^{2}) | 2,476 | 2,545 | −2.71% |
| 101 | Girard | Crawford | | 2.334 square miles (6.05 km^{2}) | 1,059.6/sq mi (409.10/km^{2}) | 2,473 | 2,496 | −0.92% |
| 102 | Kechi | Sedgwick | | 6.026 square miles (15.61 km^{2}) | 396.28/sq mi (153.01/km^{2}) | 2,388 | 2,217 | +7.71% |
| 103 | Sterling | Rice | | 1.865 square miles (4.83 km^{2}) | 1,238.1/sq mi (478.02/km^{2}) | 2,309 | 2,248 | +2.71% |
| 104 | Eureka | Greenwood | | 2.290 square miles (5.93 km^{2}) | 982.1/sq mi (379.19/km^{2}) | 2,249 | 2,332 | −3.56% |
| 105 | Holcomb | Finney | | 1.237 square miles (3.20 km^{2}) | 1,812.4/sq mi (699.8/km^{2}) | 2,242 | 2,245 | −0.13% |
| 106 | Phillipsburg | Phillips | | 1.702 square miles (4.41 km^{2}) | 1,312.0/sq mi (506.56/km^{2}) | 2,233 | 2,337 | −4.45% |
| 107 | Neodesha | Wilson | | 1.405 square miles (3.64 km^{2}) | 1,573/sq mi (607.3/km^{2}) | 2,210 | 2,275 | −2.86% |
| 108 | Cheney | Sedgwick | | 2.318 square miles (6.00 km^{2}) | 937.9/sq mi (362.12/km^{2}) | 2,174 | 2,181 | −0.32% |
| 109 | Halstead | Harvey | | 1.474 square miles (3.82 km^{2}) | 1,454.5/sq mi (561.6/km^{2}) | 2,144 | 2,179 | −1.61% |
| 110 | Seneca | Nemaha | | 1.788 square miles (4.63 km^{2}) | 1,197.4/sq mi (462.33/km^{2}) | 2,141 | 2,139 | +0.09% |
| 111 | Herington | Dickinson | Morris | 4.878 square miles (12.63 km^{2}) | 433.78/sq mi (167.49/km^{2}) | 2,116 | 2,109 | +0.33% |
| 112 | Cherryvale | Montgomery | | 2.004 square miles (5.19 km^{2}) | 1,054.9/sq mi (407.30/km^{2}) | 2,114 | 2,192 | −3.56% |
| 113 | Lakin | Kearny | | 0.946 square miles (2.45 km^{2}) | 2,232.6/sq mi (862.0/km^{2}) | 2,112 | 2,205 | −4.22% |
| 114 | Council Grove | Morris | | 2.135 square miles (5.53 km^{2}) | 984.1/sq mi (379.95/km^{2}) | 2,101 | 2,140 | −1.82% |
| 115 | Fredonia | Wilson | | 2.439 square miles (6.32 km^{2}) | 849.1/sq mi (327.85/km^{2}) | 2,071 | 2,151 | −3.72% |
| 116 | Anthony | Harper | | 3.222 square miles (8.34 km^{2}) | 636.87/sq mi (245.90/km^{2}) | 2,052 | 2,108 | −2.66% |
| 117 | Oakley | Logan | Gove, Thomas | 1.937 square miles (5.02 km^{2}) | 1,030.5/sq mi (397.86/km^{2}) | 1,996 | 2,046 | −2.44% |
| 118 | Cimarron | Gray | | 1.152 square miles (2.98 km^{2}) | 1,716.1/sq mi (662.6/km^{2}) | 1,977 | 1,981 | −0.20% |
| 119 | Belleville | Republic | | 2.056 square miles (5.33 km^{2}) | 960.6/sq mi (370.89/km^{2}) | 1,975 | 2,007 | −1.59% |
| 120 | Ellinwood | Barton | | 1.351 square miles (3.50 km^{2}) | 1,457.4/sq mi (562.7/km^{2}) | 1,969 | 2,011 | −2.09% |
| 121 | Moundridge | McPherson | | 1.569 square miles (4.06 km^{2}) | 1,252.4/sq mi (483.55/km^{2}) | 1,965 | 1,974 | −0.46% |
| 122 | Minneapolis | Ottawa | | 1.833 square miles (4.75 km^{2}) | 1,057.8/sq mi (408.43/km^{2}) | 1,939 | 1,946 | −0.36% |
| 123 | Wellsville | Franklin | | 1.719 square miles (4.45 km^{2}) | 1,124.5/sq mi (434.17/km^{2}) | 1,933 | 1,953 | −1.02% |
| 124 | Ellis | Ellis | | 1.657 square miles (4.29 km^{2}) | 1,157.5/sq mi (446.92/km^{2}) | 1,918 | 1,958 | −2.04% |
| 125 | Marion | Marion | | 2.758 square miles (7.14 km^{2}) | 685.3/sq mi (264.6/km^{2}) | 1,890 | 1,922 | −1.66% |
| 126 | Humboldt | Allen | | 1.527 square miles (3.95 km^{2}) | 1,189.9/sq mi (459.43/km^{2}) | 1,817 | 1,847 | −1.62% |
| 127 | Syracuse | Hamilton | | 4.100 square miles (10.62 km^{2}) | 440.73/sq mi (170.17/km^{2}) | 1,807 | 1,826 | −1.04% |
| 128 | North Newton | Harvey | | 0.912 square miles (2.36 km^{2}) | 1,971.5/sq mi (761.2/km^{2}) | 1,798 | 1,814 | −0.88% |
| 129 | WaKeeney | Trego | | 1.783 square miles (4.62 km^{2}) | 990.5/sq mi (382.42/km^{2}) | 1,766 | 1,799 | −1.83% |
| 130 | Caney | Montgomery | | 1.355 square miles (3.51 km^{2}) | 1,273.8/sq mi (491.8/km^{2}) | 1,726 | 1,788 | −3.47% |
| 131 | Elkhart | Morton | | 2.054 square miles (5.32 km^{2}) | 840.3/sq mi (324.45/km^{2}) | 1,726 | 1,888 | −8.58% |
| 132 | Westwood | Johnson | | 0.411 square miles (1.06 km^{2}) | 4,182/sq mi (1,614.9/km^{2}) | 1,719 | 1,750 | −1.77% |
| 133 | Edgerton | Johnson | | 8.653 square miles (22.41 km^{2}) | 198.31/sq mi (76.569/km^{2}) | 1,716 | 1,748 | −1.83% |
| 134 | Medicine Lodge | Barber | | 1.198 square miles (3.10 km^{2}) | 1,425.7/sq mi (550.5/km^{2}) | 1,708 | 1,781 | −4.10% |
| 135 | Plainville | Rooks | | 1.196 square miles (3.10 km^{2}) | 1,415.6/sq mi (546.5/km^{2}) | 1,693 | 1,746 | −3.04% |
| 136 | Ogden | Riley | | 1.673 square miles (4.33 km^{2}) | 989.8/sq mi (382.18/km^{2}) | 1,656 | 1,661 | −0.30% |
| 137 | Grandview Plaza | Geary | | 0.847 square miles (2.19 km^{2}) | 1,945.7/sq mi (751.2/km^{2}) | 1,648 | 1,697 | −2.89% |
| 138 | Oswego | Labette | Cherokee | 2.405 square miles (6.23 km^{2}) | 675.7/sq mi (260.88/km^{2}) | 1,625 | 1,668 | −2.58% |
| 139 | Oberlin | Decatur | | 1.910 square miles (4.95 km^{2}) | 842.9/sq mi (325.5/km^{2}) | 1,610 | 1,644 | −2.07% |
| 140 | Sedgwick | Harvey | Sedgwick | 1.634 square miles (4.23 km^{2}) | 968.2/sq mi (373.81/km^{2}) | 1,582 | 1,603 | −1.31% |
| 141 | Smith Center | Smith | | 1.229 square miles (3.18 km^{2}) | 1,276.6/sq mi (492.9/km^{2}) | 1,569 | 1,571 | −0.13% |
| 142 | Douglass | Butler | | 1.064 square miles (2.76 km^{2}) | 1,422.9/sq mi (549.4/km^{2}) | 1,514 | 1,555 | −2.64% |
| 143 | Horton | Brown | | 1.773 square miles (4.59 km^{2}) | 824.0/sq mi (318.16/km^{2}) | 1,461 | 1,523 | −4.07% |
| 144 | Johnson City | Stanton | | 2.142 square miles (5.55 km^{2}) | 681.1/sq mi (262.99/km^{2}) | 1,459 | 1,464 | −0.34% |
| 145 | Colwich | Sedgwick | | 1.335 square miles (3.46 km^{2}) | 1,089.1/sq mi (420.52/km^{2}) | 1,454 | 1,455 | −0.07% |
| 146 | Belle Plaine | Sumner | | 0.830 square miles (2.15 km^{2}) | 1,741.0/sq mi (672.2/km^{2}) | 1,445 | 1,467 | −1.50% |
| 147 | Meade | Meade | | 1.464 square miles (3.79 km^{2}) | 980.9/sq mi (378.72/km^{2}) | 1,505 | 1,505 | 0.00% |
| 148 | Stockton | Rooks | | 1.655 square miles (4.29 km^{2}) | 865.9/sq mi (334.31/km^{2}) | 1,433 | 1,480 | −3.18% |
| 149 | Leoti | Wichita | | 1.316 square miles (3.41 km^{2}) | 1,082.1/sq mi (417.79/km^{2}) | 1,424 | 1,475 | −3.46% |
| 150 | Towanda | Butler | | 0.930 square miles (2.41 km^{2}) | 1,531.2/sq mi (591.2/km^{2}) | 1,424 | 1,447 | −1.59% |
| 151 | Arma | Crawford | | 1.134 square miles (2.94 km^{2}) | 1,226/sq mi (473.3/km^{2}) | 1,390 | 1,407 | −1.21% |
| 152 | Chapman | Dickinson | | 0.936 square miles (2.42 km^{2}) | 1,482.9/sq mi (572.6/km^{2}) | 1,388 | 1,377 | +0.80% |
| 153 | Hill City | Graham | | 1.681 square miles (4.35 km^{2}) | 817.4/sq mi (315.59/km^{2}) | 1,374 | 1,403 | −2.07% |
| 154 | Kinsley | Edwards | | 1.296 square miles (3.36 km^{2}) | 1,050.2/sq mi (405.47/km^{2}) | 1,361 | 1,456 | −6.52% |
| 155 | Sublette | Haskell | | 1.058 square miles (2.74 km^{2}) | 1,265.6/sq mi (488.6/km^{2}) | 1,339 | 1,413 | −5.24% |
| 156 | Inman | McPherson | | 0.801 square miles (2.07 km^{2}) | 1,657.9/sq mi (640.1/km^{2}) | 1,328 | 1,341 | −0.97% |
| 157 | Buhler | Reno | | 0.745 square miles (1.93 km^{2}) | 1,765.1/sq mi (681.5/km^{2}) | 1,315 | 1,325 | −0.75% |
| 158 | Yates Center | Woodson | | 2.528 square miles (6.55 km^{2}) | 520.17/sq mi (200.84/km^{2}) | 1,315 | 1,352 | −2.74% |
| 159 | Silver Lake | Shawnee | | 0.563 square miles (1.46 km^{2}) | 2,330.4/sq mi (899.8/km^{2}) | 1,312 | 1,345 | −2.45% |
| 160 | Ness City | Ness | | 1.455 square miles (3.77 km^{2}) | 900/sq mi (347.6/km^{2}) | 1,310 | 1,329 | −1.43% |
| 161 | Carbondale | Osage | | 0.731 square miles (1.89 km^{2}) | 1,786.6/sq mi (689.8/km^{2}) | 1,306 | 1,352 | −3.40% |
| 162 | Harper | Harper | | 1.623 square miles (4.20 km^{2}) | 796.7/sq mi (307.60/km^{2}) | 1,293 | 1,313 | −1.52% |
| 163 | St. Francis | Cheyenne | | 0.857 square miles (2.22 km^{2}) | 1,495.9/sq mi (577.6/km^{2}) | 1,282 | 1,263 | +1.50% |
| 164 | Osborne | Osborne | | 1.539 square miles (3.99 km^{2}) | 827.8/sq mi (319.62/km^{2}) | 1,274 | 1,335 | −4.57% |
| 165 | Auburn | Shawnee | | 0.696 square miles (1.80 km^{2}) | 1,827.6/sq mi (705.6/km^{2}) | 1,272 | 1,273 | −0.08% |
| 166 | Wathena | Doniphan | | 2.342 square miles (6.07 km^{2}) | 538.0/sq mi (207.7/km^{2}) | 1,260 | 1,246 | +1.12% |
| 167 | Atwood | Rawlins | | 1.063 square miles (2.75 km^{2}) | 1,150.5/sq mi (444.2/km^{2}) | 1,223 | 1,290 | −5.19% |
| 168 | La Crosse | Rush | | 1.036 square miles (2.68 km^{2}) | 1,166.0/sq mi (450.2/km^{2}) | 1,208 | 1,266 | −4.58% |
| 169 | Pleasanton | Linn | | 2.168 square miles (5.62 km^{2}) | 546.6/sq mi (211.04/km^{2}) | 1,185 | 1,208 | −1.90% |
| 170 | Hoxie | Sheridan | | 0.860 square miles (2.23 km^{2}) | 1,367.4/sq mi (528.0/km^{2}) | 1,176 | 1,211 | −2.89% |
| 171 | St. John | Stafford | | 1.944 square miles (5.03 km^{2}) | 603.4/sq mi (232.97/km^{2}) | 1,173 | 1,228 | −4.48% |
| 172 | Haven | Reno | | 0.777 square miles (2.01 km^{2}) | 1,503.2/sq mi (580.4/km^{2}) | 1,168 | 1,170 | −0.17% |
| 173 | Lincoln Center | Lincoln | | 1.252 square miles (3.24 km^{2}) | 927/sq mi (357.7/km^{2}) | 1,160 | 1,171 | −0.94% |
| 174 | St. George | Pottawatomie | | 0.645 square miles (1.67 km^{2}) | 1,783/sq mi (688/km^{2}) | 1,150 | 1,054 | +9.11% |
| 175 | Elwood | Doniphan | | 2.910 square miles (7.54 km^{2}) | 390.72/sq mi (150.86/km^{2}) | 1,137 | 1,125 | +1.07% |
| 176 | Conway Springs | Sumner | | 0.987 square miles (2.56 km^{2}) | 1,149.9/sq mi (444.0/km^{2}) | 1,135 | 1,086 | +4.51% |
| 177 | Victoria | Ellis | | 0.612 square miles (1.59 km^{2}) | 1,844.8/sq mi (712.3/km^{2}) | 1,129 | 1,129 | 0.00% |
| 178 | Linn Valley | Linn | | 3.180 square miles (8.24 km^{2}) | 349.69/sq mi (135.01/km^{2}) | 1,112 | 956 | +16.32% |
| 179 | Rossville | Shawnee | | 0.554 square miles (1.43 km^{2}) | 1,968/sq mi (760/km^{2}) | 1,090 | 1,105 | −1.36% |
| 180 | Washington | Washington | | 0.972 square miles (2.52 km^{2}) | 1,106.0/sq mi (427.0/km^{2}) | 1,075 | 1,071 | +0.37% |
| 181 | Oskaloosa | Jefferson | | 0.994 square miles (2.57 km^{2}) | 1,079.5/sq mi (416.8/km^{2}) | 1,073 | 1,110 | −3.33% |
| 182 | Valley Falls | Jefferson | | 0.704 square miles (1.82 km^{2}) | 1,514.2/sq mi (584.6/km^{2}) | 1,066 | 1,092 | −2.38% |
| 183 | Nickerson | Reno | | 1.295 square miles (3.35 km^{2}) | 812.4/sq mi (313.65/km^{2}) | 1,052 | 1,058 | −0.57% |
| 184 | Altamont | Labette | | 1.696 square miles (4.39 km^{2}) | 617.3/sq mi (238.35/km^{2}) | 1,047 | 1,061 | −1.32% |
| 185 | Satanta | Haskell | | 0.616 square miles (1.60 km^{2}) | 1,691.6/sq mi (653.1/km^{2}) | 1,042 | 1,092 | −4.58% |
| 186 | Lyndon | Osage | | 0.892 square miles (2.31 km^{2}) | 1,162.6/sq mi (448.9/km^{2}) | 1,037 | 1,037 | 0.00% |
| 187 | Oxford | Sumner | | 0.906 square miles (2.35 km^{2}) | 1,143.5/sq mi (441.5/km^{2}) | 1,036 | 1,048 | −1.15% |
| 188 | Erie | Neosho | | 1.267 square miles (3.28 km^{2}) | 816.9/sq mi (315.40/km^{2}) | 1,035 | 1,047 | −1.15% |
| 189 | La Cygne | Linn | | 1.528 square miles (3.96 km^{2}) | 666.9/sq mi (257.49/km^{2}) | 1,019 | 1,050 | −2.95% |
| 190 | Lake Quivira | Johnson | Wyandotte | 1.476 square miles (3.82 km^{2}) | 681.6/sq mi (263.16/km^{2}) | 1,006 | 1,014 | −0.79% |
| 191 | Plains | Meade | | 0.999 square miles (2.59 km^{2}) | 1,007.0/sq mi (388.8/km^{2}) | 1,006 | 1,037 | −2.99% |
| 192 | Solomon | Dickinson | Saline | 0.861 square miles (2.23 km^{2}) | 1,168.4/sq mi (451.1/km^{2}) | 1,006 | 993 | +1.31% |
| 193 | Caldwell | Sumner | | 1.081 square miles (2.80 km^{2}) | 900/sq mi (360/km^{2}) | 1,000 | 1,025 | −2.44% |
| 194 | Overbrook | Osage | | 0.544 square miles (1.41 km^{2}) | 1,834.6/sq mi (708.3/km^{2}) | 998 | 1,005 | −0.70% |
| 195 | Montezuma | Gray | | 1.015 square miles (2.63 km^{2}) | 979.3/sq mi (378.1/km^{2}) | 994 | 975 | +1.95% |
| 196 | Garden Plain | Sedgwick | | 1.127 square miles (2.92 km^{2}) | 875.8/sq mi (338.1/km^{2}) | 987 | 948 | +4.11% |
| 197 | Sedan | Chautauqua | | 0.822 square miles (2.13 km^{2}) | 1,198.3/sq mi (462.7/km^{2}) | 985 | 1,000 | −1.50% |
| 198 | Troy | Doniphan | | 0.975 square miles (2.53 km^{2}) | 1,007.2/sq mi (388.9/km^{2}) | 982 | 964 | +1.87% |
| 199 | Riley | Riley | | 0.508 square miles (1.32 km^{2}) | 1,879.9/sq mi (725.8/km^{2}) | 955 | 938 | +1.81% |
| 200 | Burlingame | Osage | | 0.884 square miles (2.29 km^{2}) | 1,062.2/sq mi (410.1/km^{2}) | 939 | 971 | −3.30% |
| 201 | Highland | Doniphan | | 0.534 square miles (1.38 km^{2}) | 1,745.3/sq mi (673.9/km^{2}) | 932 | 903 | +3.21% |
| 202 | Benton | Butler | | 1.536 square miles (3.98 km^{2}) | 605/sq mi (233.8/km^{2}) | 930 | 943 | −1.38% |
| 203 | Andale | Sedgwick | | 0.595 square miles (1.54 km^{2}) | 1,561.3/sq mi (602.8/km^{2}) | 929 | 941 | −1.28% |
| 204 | Blue Rapids | Marshall | | 1.985 square miles (5.14 km^{2}) | 464.0/sq mi (179.14/km^{2}) | 921 | 928 | −0.75% |
| 205 | Stafford | Stafford | | 0.915 square miles (2.37 km^{2}) | 1,005/sq mi (388.2/km^{2}) | 920 | 959 | −4.07% |
| 206 | Quinter | Gove | | 1.005 square miles (2.60 km^{2}) | 914.4/sq mi (353.1/km^{2}) | 919 | 929 | −1.08% |
| 207 | Peabody | Marion | | 1.266 square miles (3.28 km^{2}) | 723.5/sq mi (279.36/km^{2}) | 916 | 937 | −2.24% |
| 208 | Dighton | Lane | | 0.867 square miles (2.25 km^{2}) | 1,046.1/sq mi (403.9/km^{2}) | 907 | 960 | −5.52% |
| 209 | Chetopa | Labette | | 1.364 square miles (3.53 km^{2}) | 663.5/sq mi (256.17/km^{2}) | 905 | 929 | −2.58% |
| 210 | Pomona | Franklin | | 0.944 square miles (2.44 km^{2}) | 943.9/sq mi (364.4/km^{2}) | 891 | 884 | +0.79% |
| 211 | Lebo | Coffey | | 0.968 square miles (2.51 km^{2}) | 916.3/sq mi (353.8/km^{2}) | 887 | 885 | +0.23% |
| 212 | Kiowa | Barber | | 1.108 square miles (2.87 km^{2}) | 785/sq mi (303.2/km^{2}) | 870 | 902 | −3.55% |
| 213 | Burrton | Harvey | | 0.900 square miles (2.33 km^{2}) | 940.0/sq mi (362.9/km^{2}) | 846 | 861 | −1.74% |
| 214 | Perry | Jefferson | | 0.750 square miles (1.94 km^{2}) | 1,128.0/sq mi (435.5/km^{2}) | 846 | 852 | −0.70% |
| 215 | Wakefield | Clay | | 0.497 square miles (1.29 km^{2}) | 1,690/sq mi (653/km^{2}) | 840 | 858 | −2.10% |
| 216 | Alma | Wabaunsee | | 0.585 square miles (1.52 km^{2}) | 1,434.2/sq mi (553.7/km^{2}) | 839 | 802 | +4.61% |
| 217 | McLouth | Jefferson | | 0.576 square miles (1.49 km^{2}) | 1,454.9/sq mi (561.7/km^{2}) | 838 | 859 | −2.44% |
| 218 | Wilson | Ellsworth | | 0.598 square miles (1.55 km^{2}) | 1,394.6/sq mi (538.5/km^{2}) | 834 | 859 | −2.91% |
| 219 | Cottonwood Falls | Chase | | 0.644 square miles (1.67 km^{2}) | 1,293.5/sq mi (499.4/km^{2}) | 833 | 851 | −2.12% |
| 220 | Galva | McPherson | | 0.499 square miles (1.29 km^{2}) | 1,655.3/sq mi (639.1/km^{2}) | 826 | 834 | −0.96% |
| 221 | Mankato | Jewell | | 0.975 square miles (2.53 km^{2}) | 847.2/sq mi (327.1/km^{2}) | 826 | 836 | −1.20% |
| 222 | Mount Hope | Sedgwick | | 1.354 square miles (3.51 km^{2}) | 593.8/sq mi (229.27/km^{2}) | 804 | 806 | −0.25% |
| 223 | Spearville | Ford | | 0.628 square miles (1.63 km^{2}) | 1,242/sq mi (480/km^{2}) | 780 | 791 | −1.39% |
| 224 | Americus | Lyon | | 1.083 square miles (2.80 km^{2}) | 719.3/sq mi (277.72/km^{2}) | 779 | 776 | +0.39% |
| 225 | Downs | Osborne | | 1.120 square miles (2.90 km^{2}) | 689.3/sq mi (266.13/km^{2}) | 772 | 800 | −3.50% |
| 226 | Jetmore | Hodgeman | | 4.210 square miles (10.90 km^{2}) | 177.67/sq mi (68.60/km^{2}) | 748 | 770 | −2.86% |
| 227 | Eastborough | Sedgwick | | 0.385 square miles (1.00 km^{2}) | 1,930/sq mi (745.1/km^{2}) | 743 | 756 | −1.72% |
| 228 | Ashland | Clark | | 1.691 square miles (4.38 km^{2}) | 434.1/sq mi (167.59/km^{2}) | 734 | 783 | −6.26% |
| 229 | Sharon Springs | Wallace | | 0.903 square miles (2.34 km^{2}) | 811.7/sq mi (313.4/km^{2}) | 733 | 751 | −2.40% |
| 230 | Westmoreland | Pottawatomie | | 0.564 square miles (1.46 km^{2}) | 1,297.9/sq mi (501.1/km^{2}) | 732 | 740 | −1.08% |
| 231 | Greensburg | Kiowa | | 1.789 square miles (4.63 km^{2}) | 408.6/sq mi (157.76/km^{2}) | 731 | 740 | −1.22% |
| 232 | Frankfort | Marshall | | 1.007 square miles (2.61 km^{2}) | 721.0/sq mi (278.4/km^{2}) | 726 | 730 | −0.55% |
| 233 | Meriden | Jefferson | | 0.769 square miles (1.99 km^{2}) | 935.0/sq mi (361.0/km^{2}) | 719 | 744 | −3.36% |
| 234 | Enterprise | Dickinson | | 0.670 square miles (1.74 km^{2}) | 1,060/sq mi (409/km^{2}) | 710 | 708 | +0.28% |
| 235 | Minneola | Clark | | 0.459 square miles (1.19 km^{2}) | 1,530/sq mi (590/km^{2}) | 700 | 738 | −5.15% |
| 236 | Bucklin | Ford | | 0.575 square miles (1.49 km^{2}) | 1,210.4/sq mi (467.4/km^{2}) | 696 | 727 | −4.26% |
| 237 | Hanover | Washington | | 0.599 square miles (1.55 km^{2}) | 1,161.9/sq mi (448.6/km^{2}) | 696 | 690 | +0.87% |
| 238 | Tribune | Greeley | | 0.742 square miles (1.92 km^{2}) | 931.3/sq mi (359.6/km^{2}) | 691 | 772 | −10.49% |
| 239 | Deerfield | Kearny | | 0.481 square miles (1.25 km^{2}) | 1,430.4/sq mi (552.3/km^{2}) | 688 | 711 | −3.23% |
| 240 | Coldwater | Comanche | | 2.562 square miles (6.64 km^{2}) | 268.15/sq mi (103.53/km^{2}) | 687 | 687 | 0.00% |
| 241 | Onaga | Pottawatomie | | 0.656 square miles (1.70 km^{2}) | 1,038.1/sq mi (400.8/km^{2}) | 681 | 679 | +0.29% |
| 242 | Clyde | Cloud | | 0.673 square miles (1.74 km^{2}) | 994.1/sq mi (383.8/km^{2}) | 669 | 694 | −3.60% |
| 243 | Madison | Greenwood | | 0.584 square miles (1.51 km^{2}) | 1,143.8/sq mi (441.6/km^{2}) | 668 | 689 | −3.05% |
| 244 | Haviland | Kiowa | | 0.492 square miles (1.27 km^{2}) | 1,353.7/sq mi (522.7/km^{2}) | 666 | 678 | −1.77% |
| 245 | Canton | McPherson | | 0.497 square miles (1.29 km^{2}) | 1,336.0/sq mi (515.8/km^{2}) | 664 | 685 | −3.07% |
| 246 | Whitewater | Butler | | 0.411 square miles (1.06 km^{2}) | 1,586.4/sq mi (612.5/km^{2}) | 652 | 661 | −1.36% |
| 247 | Pretty Prairie | Reno | | 0.576 square miles (1.49 km^{2}) | 1,130.2/sq mi (436.4/km^{2}) | 651 | 660 | −1.36% |
| 248 | Waterville | Marshall | | 0.492 square miles (1.27 km^{2}) | 1,321/sq mi (510/km^{2}) | 650 | 658 | −1.22% |
| 249 | Bennington | Ottawa | | 0.420 square miles (1.09 km^{2}) | 1,545.2/sq mi (596.6/km^{2}) | 649 | 622 | +4.34% |
| 250 | Leon | Butler | | 0.751 square miles (1.95 km^{2}) | 864.2/sq mi (333.7/km^{2}) | 649 | 669 | −2.99% |
| 251 | Scranton | Osage | | 1.077 square miles (2.79 km^{2}) | 595.2/sq mi (229.80/km^{2}) | 641 | 653 | −1.84% |
| 252 | Udall | Cowley | | 0.545 square miles (1.41 km^{2}) | 1,176.1/sq mi (454.1/km^{2}) | 641 | 661 | −3.03% |
| 253 | Mound City | Linn | | 1.156 square miles (2.99 km^{2}) | 554/sq mi (213.8/km^{2}) | 640 | 647 | −1.08% |
| 254 | Maple Hill | Wabaunsee | | 0.243 square miles (0.63 km^{2}) | 2,630/sq mi (1,015.3/km^{2}) | 639 | 631 | +1.27% |
| 255 | Ozawkie | Jefferson | | 0.297 square miles (0.77 km^{2}) | 2,098/sq mi (809.9/km^{2}) | 623 | 638 | −2.35% |
| 256 | St. Paul | Neosho | | 1.128 square miles (2.92 km^{2}) | 546.1/sq mi (210.85/km^{2}) | 616 | 614 | +0.33% |
| 257 | Cherokee | Crawford | | 0.824 square miles (2.13 km^{2}) | 723.3/sq mi (279.3/km^{2}) | 596 | 590 | +1.02% |
| 258 | Hoyt | Jackson | | 0.469 square miles (1.21 km^{2}) | 1,270.8/sq mi (490.7/km^{2}) | 596 | 593 | +0.51% |
| 259 | Marquette | McPherson | | 0.482 square miles (1.25 km^{2}) | 1,236.5/sq mi (477.4/km^{2}) | 596 | 599 | −0.50% |
| 260 | Lecompton | Douglas | | 1.229 square miles (3.18 km^{2}) | 481.7/sq mi (185.98/km^{2}) | 592 | 588 | +0.68% |
| 261 | Nortonville | Jefferson | | 0.432 square miles (1.12 km^{2}) | 1,356.5/sq mi (523.7/km^{2}) | 586 | 601 | −2.50% |
| 262 | Bentley | Sedgwick | | 0.304 square miles (0.79 km^{2}) | 1,888/sq mi (729.0/km^{2}) | 574 | 560 | +2.50% |
| 263 | Waverly | Coffey | | 0.732 square miles (1.90 km^{2}) | 779/sq mi (300.7/km^{2}) | 570 | 574 | −0.70% |
| 264 | Weir | Cherokee | | 1.138 square miles (2.95 km^{2}) | 501/sq mi (193.4/km^{2}) | 570 | 569 | +0.18% |
| 265 | Howard | Elk | | 0.706 square miles (1.83 km^{2}) | 794.6/sq mi (306.8/km^{2}) | 561 | 570 | −1.58% |
| 266 | Goessel | Marion | | 0.379 square miles (0.98 km^{2}) | 1,456/sq mi (562.3/km^{2}) | 552 | 556 | −0.72% |
| 267 | Claflin | Barton | | 0.339 square miles (0.88 km^{2}) | 1,602/sq mi (618.4/km^{2}) | 543 | 562 | −3.38% |
| 268 | Olpe | Lyon | | 0.703 square miles (1.82 km^{2}) | 751.1/sq mi (290.0/km^{2}) | 528 | 519 | +1.73% |
| 269 | Fowler | Meade | | 0.474 square miles (1.23 km^{2}) | 1,080.2/sq mi (417.1/km^{2}) | 512 | 534 | −4.12% |
| 270 | Attica | Harper | | 0.634 square miles (1.64 km^{2}) | 798.1/sq mi (308.2/km^{2}) | 506 | 516 | −1.94% |
| 271 | Burden | Cowley | | 0.517 square miles (1.34 km^{2}) | 978.7/sq mi (377.9/km^{2}) | 506 | 512 | −1.17% |
| 272 | Protection | Comanche | | 0.927 square miles (2.40 km^{2}) | 534.0/sq mi (206.2/km^{2}) | 495 | 498 | −0.60% |
| 273 | Centralia | Nemaha | | 0.461 square miles (1.19 km^{2}) | 1,065.1/sq mi (411.2/km^{2}) | 491 | 485 | +1.24% |
| 274 | La Harpe | Allen | | 0.797 square miles (2.06 km^{2}) | 612.3/sq mi (236.4/km^{2}) | 488 | 480 | +1.67% |
| 275 | Effingham | Atchison | | 0.619 square miles (1.60 km^{2}) | 786.8/sq mi (303.8/km^{2}) | 487 | 495 | −1.62% |
| 276 | Cedar Vale | Chautauqua | | 0.754 square miles (1.95 km^{2}) | 628.6/sq mi (242.7/km^{2}) | 474 | 476 | −0.42% |
| 277 | Little River | Rice | | 0.390 square miles (1.01 km^{2}) | 1,200.0/sq mi (463.3/km^{2}) | 468 | 472 | −0.85% |
| 278 | Gas | Allen | | 0.720 square miles (1.86 km^{2}) | 647.2/sq mi (249.9/km^{2}) | 466 | 475 | −1.89% |
| 279 | Moran | Allen | | 0.419 square miles (1.09 km^{2}) | 1,105.0/sq mi (426.6/km^{2}) | 463 | 466 | −0.64% |
| 280 | Cawker City | Mitchell | | 1.006 square miles (2.61 km^{2}) | 459.2/sq mi (177.32/km^{2}) | 462 | 457 | +1.09% |
| 281 | Clifton | Washington | Clay | 0.408 square miles (1.06 km^{2}) | 1,117.6/sq mi (431.5/km^{2}) | 456 | 454 | +0.44% |
| 282 | Macksville | Stafford | | 0.998 square miles (2.58 km^{2}) | 455.9/sq mi (176.03/km^{2}) | 455 | 471 | −3.40% |
| 283 | Bird City | Cheyenne | | 2.266 square miles (5.87 km^{2}) | 197.71/sq mi (76.33/km^{2}) | 448 | 437 | +2.52% |
| 284 | Argonia | Sumner | | 0.698 square miles (1.81 km^{2}) | 640.4/sq mi (247.3/km^{2}) | 447 | 456 | −1.97% |
| 285 | LeRoy | Coffey | | 0.824 square miles (2.13 km^{2}) | 541.3/sq mi (209.0/km^{2}) | 446 | 451 | −1.11% |
| 286 | Winchester | Jefferson | | 0.329 square miles (0.85 km^{2}) | 1,347/sq mi (519.9/km^{2}) | 443 | 461 | −3.90% |
| 287 | Leonardville | Riley | | 0.306 square miles (0.79 km^{2}) | 1,441/sq mi (556.4/km^{2}) | 441 | 432 | +2.08% |
| 288 | Richmond | Franklin | | 0.341 square miles (0.88 km^{2}) | 1,287/sq mi (497.1/km^{2}) | 439 | 459 | −4.36% |
| 289 | Eskridge | Wabaunsee | | 0.517 square miles (1.34 km^{2}) | 845.3/sq mi (326.4/km^{2}) | 437 | 439 | −0.46% |
| 290 | White City | Morris | | 1.242 square miles (3.22 km^{2}) | 351.9/sq mi (135.85/km^{2}) | 437 | 447 | −2.24% |
| 291 | Glasco | Cloud | | 0.332 square miles (0.86 km^{2}) | 1,304/sq mi (503.6/km^{2}) | 433 | 441 | −1.81% |
| 292 | Miltonvale | Cloud | | 0.749 square miles (1.94 km^{2}) | 578.1/sq mi (223.2/km^{2}) | 433 | 440 | −1.59% |
| 293 | Kanopolis | Ellsworth | | 1.178 square miles (3.05 km^{2}) | 366.7/sq mi (141.59/km^{2}) | 432 | 443 | −2.48% |
| 294 | Logan | Phillips | | 1.500 square miles (3.88 km^{2}) | 287.3/sq mi (110.94/km^{2}) | 431 | 460 | −6.30% |
| 295 | Linwood | Leavenworth | | 0.590 square miles (1.53 km^{2}) | 725.4/sq mi (280.1/km^{2}) | 428 | 415 | +3.13% |
| 296 | Arlington | Reno | | 1.233 square miles (3.19 km^{2}) | 346.3/sq mi (133.71/km^{2}) | 427 | 435 | −1.84% |
| 297 | Thayer | Neosho | | 0.545 square miles (1.41 km^{2}) | 781.7/sq mi (301.8/km^{2}) | 426 | 432 | −1.39% |
| 298 | Assaria | Saline | | 0.234 square miles (0.61 km^{2}) | 1,812/sq mi (699.6/km^{2}) | 424 | 428 | −0.93% |
| 299 | New Strawn | Coffey | | 0.793 square miles (2.05 km^{2}) | 528.4/sq mi (204.0/km^{2}) | 419 | 414 | +1.21% |
| 300 | Potwin | Butler | | 0.235 square miles (0.61 km^{2}) | 1,757/sq mi (678.6/km^{2}) | 413 | 421 | −1.90% |
| 301 | Alta Vista | Wabaunsee | | 0.349 square miles (0.90 km^{2}) | 1,180.5/sq mi (455.8/km^{2}) | 412 | 409 | +0.73% |
| 302 | Mulberry | Crawford | | 0.471 square miles (1.22 km^{2}) | 872.6/sq mi (336.9/km^{2}) | 411 | 409 | +0.49% |
| 303 | Norwich | Kingman | | 0.402 square miles (1.04 km^{2}) | 1,020/sq mi (394/km^{2}) | 410 | 444 | −7.66% |
| 304 | Axtell | Marshall | | 0.523 square miles (1.35 km^{2}) | 774.4/sq mi (299.0/km^{2}) | 405 | 399 | +1.50% |
| 305 | Cunningham | Kingman | | 0.458 square miles (1.19 km^{2}) | 879.9/sq mi (339.7/km^{2}) | 403 | 444 | −9.23% |
| 306 | Parkerfield | Cowley | | 0.913 square miles (2.36 km^{2}) | 441.4/sq mi (170.43/km^{2}) | 403 | 406 | −0.74% |
| 307 | Kensington | Smith | | 0.335 square miles (0.87 km^{2}) | 1,182/sq mi (456.4/km^{2}) | 396 | 399 | −0.75% |
| 308 | Westwood Hills | Johnson | | 0.064 square miles (0.17 km^{2}) | 6,170/sq mi (2,383/km^{2}) | 395 | 400 | −1.25% |
| 309 | Gypsum | Saline | | 0.374 square miles (0.97 km^{2}) | 1,053.5/sq mi (406.7/km^{2}) | 394 | 400 | −1.50% |
| 310 | Milford | Geary | | 0.572 square miles (1.48 km^{2}) | 688.8/sq mi (266.0/km^{2}) | 394 | 408 | −3.43% |
| 311 | Chase | Rice | | 0.278 square miles (0.72 km^{2}) | 1,399/sq mi (540.3/km^{2}) | 389 | 396 | −1.77% |
| 312 | Linn | Washington | | 0.339 square miles (0.88 km^{2}) | 1,147/sq mi (443.0/km^{2}) | 389 | 387 | +0.52% |
| 313 | Holyrood | Ellsworth | | 0.480 square miles (1.24 km^{2}) | 802.1/sq mi (309.7/km^{2}) | 385 | 403 | −4.47% |
| 314 | Williamsburg | Franklin | | 0.968 square miles (2.51 km^{2}) | 397.7/sq mi (153.56/km^{2}) | 385 | 390 | −1.28% |
| 315 | Colony | Anderson | | 0.484 square miles (1.25 km^{2}) | 791.3/sq mi (305.5/km^{2}) | 383 | 381 | +0.52% |
| 316 | Edna | Labette | | 0.394 square miles (1.02 km^{2}) | 969.5/sq mi (374.3/km^{2}) | 382 | 388 | −1.55% |
| 317 | Florence | Marion | | 0.766 square miles (1.98 km^{2}) | 497.4/sq mi (192.0/km^{2}) | 381 | 394 | −3.30% |
| 318 | Gorham | Russell | | 0.239 square miles (0.62 km^{2}) | 1,586/sq mi (612.3/km^{2}) | 379 | 376 | +0.80% |
| 319 | Lewis | Edwards | | 0.315 square miles (0.82 km^{2}) | 1,200/sq mi (463.3/km^{2}) | 378 | 400 | −5.50% |
| 320 | Strong City | Chase | | 0.548 square miles (1.42 km^{2}) | 688.0/sq mi (265.6/km^{2}) | 377 | 386 | −2.33% |
| 321 | McCune | Crawford | | 0.318 square miles (0.82 km^{2}) | 1,176/sq mi (454.1/km^{2}) | 374 | 370 | +1.08% |
| 322 | Dearing | Montgomery | | 1.514 square miles (3.92 km^{2}) | 245.7/sq mi (94.87/km^{2}) | 372 | 382 | −2.62% |
| 323 | Greeley County Unified Government | Greeley | | 777.417 square miles (2,013.50 km^{2}) | 0.476/sq mi (0.1838/km^{2}) | 370 | 410 | −9.76% |
| 324 | Scammon | Cherokee | | 0.627 square miles (1.62 km^{2}) | 586.9/sq mi (226.6/km^{2}) | 368 | 376 | −2.13% |
| 325 | Hartford | Lyon | | 0.396 square miles (1.03 km^{2}) | 919.2/sq mi (354.9/km^{2}) | 364 | 355 | +2.54% |
| 326 | Glen Elder | Mitchell | | 0.436 square miles (1.13 km^{2}) | 832.6/sq mi (321.5/km^{2}) | 363 | 362 | +0.28% |
| 327 | Mayetta | Jackson | | 0.184 square miles (0.48 km^{2}) | 1,951/sq mi (753.3/km^{2}) | 359 | 348 | +3.16% |
| 328 | Rolla | Morton | | 0.373 square miles (0.97 km^{2}) | 954.4/sq mi (368.5/km^{2}) | 356 | 384 | −7.29% |
| 329 | Almena | Norton | | 0.605 square miles (1.57 km^{2}) | 581.8/sq mi (224.6/km^{2}) | 352 | 363 | −3.03% |
| 330 | Greenleaf | Washington | | 0.452 square miles (1.17 km^{2}) | 776.5/sq mi (299.8/km^{2}) | 351 | 350 | +0.29% |
| 331 | Jewell | Jewell | | 0.411 square miles (1.06 km^{2}) | 854.0/sq mi (329.7/km^{2}) | 351 | 370 | −5.14% |
| 332 | Mound Valley | Labette | | 0.642 square miles (1.66 km^{2}) | 543.6/sq mi (209.9/km^{2}) | 349 | 348 | +0.29% |
| 333 | The Highlands | Reno | | 1.025 square miles (2.65 km^{2}) | 340.5/sq mi (131.46/km^{2}) | 349 | 349 | 0.00% |
| 334 | Melvern | Osage | | 0.356 square miles (0.92 km^{2}) | 969.1/sq mi (374.2/km^{2}) | 345 | 356 | −3.09% |
| 335 | Altoona | Wilson | | 0.534 square miles (1.38 km^{2}) | 642.3/sq mi (248.0/km^{2}) | 343 | 354 | −3.11% |
| 336 | Wetmore | Nemaha | | 0.387 square miles (1.00 km^{2}) | 876.0/sq mi (338.2/km^{2}) | 339 | 348 | −2.59% |
| 337 | Lucas | Russell | | 0.608 square miles (1.57 km^{2}) | 554.3/sq mi (214.0/km^{2}) | 337 | 332 | +1.51% |
| 338 | Scandia | Republic | | 0.471 square miles (1.22 km^{2}) | 715.5/sq mi (276.3/km^{2}) | 337 | 344 | −2.03% |
| 339 | Moline | Elk | | 0.335 square miles (0.87 km^{2}) | 1,003.0/sq mi (387.3/km^{2}) | 336 | 345 | −2.61% |
| 340 | Kismet | Seward | | 0.236 square miles (0.61 km^{2}) | 1,407/sq mi (543.2/km^{2}) | 332 | 340 | −2.35% |
| 341 | South Haven | Sumner | | 0.999 square miles (2.59 km^{2}) | 325.3/sq mi (125.61/km^{2}) | 325 | 324 | +0.31% |
| 342 | Gridley | Coffey | | 0.428 square miles (1.11 km^{2}) | 731.3/sq mi (282.4/km^{2}) | 313 | 313 | 0.00% |
| 343 | Hope | Dickinson | | 0.389 square miles (1.01 km^{2}) | 804.6/sq mi (310.7/km^{2}) | 313 | 317 | −1.26% |
| 344 | Grainfield | Gove | | 0.462 square miles (1.20 km^{2}) | 671/sq mi (259/km^{2}) | 310 | 322 | −3.73% |
| 345 | Bronson | Bourbon | | 0.447 square miles (1.16 km^{2}) | 686.8/sq mi (265.2/km^{2}) | 307 | 304 | +0.99% |
| 346 | Turon | Reno | | 0.445 square miles (1.15 km^{2}) | 687.6/sq mi (265.5/km^{2}) | 306 | 309 | −0.97% |
| 347 | Delphos | Ottawa | | 0.593 square miles (1.54 km^{2}) | 507.6/sq mi (196.0/km^{2}) | 301 | 302 | −0.33% |
| 348 | Uniontown | Bourbon | | 0.211 square miles (0.55 km^{2}) | 1,408/sq mi (543.5/km^{2}) | 297 | 293 | +1.37% |
| 349 | Courtland | Republic | | 0.269 square miles (0.70 km^{2}) | 1,082/sq mi (417.7/km^{2}) | 291 | 294 | −1.02% |
| 350 | Natoma | Osborne | | 0.422 square miles (1.09 km^{2}) | 687/sq mi (265/km^{2}) | 290 | 302 | −3.97% |
| 351 | Sylvan Grove | Lincoln | | 0.385 square miles (1.00 km^{2}) | 750.6/sq mi (289.8/km^{2}) | 289 | 291 | −0.69% |
| 352 | Quenemo | Osage | | 0.444 square miles (1.15 km^{2}) | 646.4/sq mi (249.6/km^{2}) | 287 | 288 | −0.35% |
| 353 | Brewster | Thomas | | 0.258 square miles (0.67 km^{2}) | 1,093/sq mi (422.0/km^{2}) | 282 | 291 | −3.09% |
| 354 | Otis | Rush | | 0.313 square miles (0.81 km^{2}) | 901.0/sq mi (347.9/km^{2}) | 282 | 296 | −4.73% |
| 355 | Longton | Elk | | 1.175 square miles (3.04 km^{2}) | 238/sq mi (92.0/km^{2}) | 280 | 288 | −2.78% |
| 356 | McFarland | Wabaunsee | | 0.178 square miles (0.46 km^{2}) | 1,570/sq mi (607/km^{2}) | 280 | 272 | +2.94% |
| 357 | Greeley | Anderson | | 0.344 square miles (0.89 km^{2}) | 802.3/sq mi (309.8/km^{2}) | 276 | 273 | +1.10% |
| 358 | Bazine | Ness | | 0.449 square miles (1.16 km^{2}) | 601/sq mi (232/km^{2}) | 270 | 282 | −4.26% |
| 359 | Tescott | Ottawa | | 0.386 square miles (1.00 km^{2}) | 689.1/sq mi (266.1/km^{2}) | 266 | 265 | +0.38% |
| 360 | Moscow | Stevens | | 0.171 square miles (0.44 km^{2}) | 1,520/sq mi (587/km^{2}) | 260 | 272 | −4.41% |
| 361 | Arcadia | Crawford | | 0.429 square miles (1.11 km^{2}) | 599.1/sq mi (231.3/km^{2}) | 257 | 254 | +1.18% |
| 362 | Grinnell | Gove | | 0.492 square miles (1.27 km^{2}) | 518.3/sq mi (200.1/km^{2}) | 255 | 260 | −1.92% |
| 363 | Ransom | Ness | | 0.351 square miles (0.91 km^{2}) | 726.5/sq mi (280.5/km^{2}) | 255 | 260 | −1.92% |
| 364 | Ingalls | Gray | | 0.260 square miles (0.67 km^{2}) | 969/sq mi (374.2/km^{2}) | 252 | 252 | 0.00% |
| 365 | Copeland | Gray | | 0.233 square miles (0.60 km^{2}) | 1,077/sq mi (415.9/km^{2}) | 251 | 251 | 0.00% |
| 366 | Princeton | Franklin | | 0.338 square miles (0.88 km^{2}) | 742.6/sq mi (286.7/km^{2}) | 251 | 248 | +1.21% |
| 367 | Elk City | Montgomery | | 0.338 square miles (0.88 km^{2}) | 740/sq mi (286/km^{2}) | 250 | 260 | −3.85% |
| 368 | Everest | Brown | | 0.232 square miles (0.60 km^{2}) | 1,073/sq mi (414.4/km^{2}) | 249 | 265 | −6.04% |
| 369 | Hanston | Hodgeman | | 0.270 square miles (0.70 km^{2}) | 922/sq mi (356.1/km^{2}) | 249 | 259 | −3.86% |
| 370 | Lancaster | Atchison | | 0.199 square miles (0.52 km^{2}) | 1,226/sq mi (473.4/km^{2}) | 244 | 246 | −0.81% |
| 371 | Lane | Franklin | | 0.233 square miles (0.60 km^{2}) | 1,043/sq mi (402.7/km^{2}) | 243 | 241 | +0.83% |
| 372 | Neosho Rapids | Lyon | | 0.505 square miles (1.31 km^{2}) | 473.3/sq mi (182.7/km^{2}) | 239 | 229 | +4.37% |
| 373 | Brookville | Saline | | 0.575 square miles (1.49 km^{2}) | 408.7/sq mi (157.8/km^{2}) | 235 | 247 | −4.86% |
| 374 | Fairview | Brown | | 0.343 square miles (0.89 km^{2}) | 679.3/sq mi (262.3/km^{2}) | 233 | 240 | −2.92% |
| 375 | Jamestown | Cloud | | 0.293 square miles (0.76 km^{2}) | 795.2/sq mi (307.0/km^{2}) | 233 | 237 | −1.69% |
| 376 | Burns | Marion | | 0.344 square miles (0.89 km^{2}) | 671.5/sq mi (259.3/km^{2}) | 231 | 234 | −1.28% |
| 377 | Fontana | Miami | | 0.900 square miles (2.33 km^{2}) | 256.7/sq mi (99.10/km^{2}) | 231 | 210 | +10.00% |
| 378 | Dexter | Cowley | | 0.277 square miles (0.72 km^{2}) | 827/sq mi (319.2/km^{2}) | 229 | 224 | +2.23% |
| 379 | Parker | Linn | | 0.281 square miles (0.73 km^{2}) | 815/sq mi (314.7/km^{2}) | 229 | 241 | −4.98% |
| 380 | Geneseo | Rice | | 0.586 square miles (1.52 km^{2}) | 385.7/sq mi (148.9/km^{2}) | 226 | 236 | −4.24% |
| 381 | Olsburg | Pottawatomie | | 0.234 square miles (0.61 km^{2}) | 966/sq mi (372.9/km^{2}) | 226 | 218 | +3.67% |
| 382 | Blue Mound | Linn | | 0.636 square miles (1.65 km^{2}) | 346/sq mi (133.6/km^{2}) | 220 | 219 | +0.46% |
| 383 | Elbing | Butler | | 0.176 square miles (0.46 km^{2}) | 1,250/sq mi (483/km^{2}) | 220 | 226 | −2.65% |
| 384 | Walton | Harvey | | 0.311 square miles (0.81 km^{2}) | 701.0/sq mi (270.6/km^{2}) | 218 | 219 | −0.46% |
| 385 | Burdett | Pawnee | | 0.260 square miles (0.67 km^{2}) | 831/sq mi (320.8/km^{2}) | 216 | 228 | −5.26% |
| 386 | Easton | Leavenworth | | 0.169 square miles (0.44 km^{2}) | 1,260/sq mi (486.6/km^{2}) | 213 | 213 | 0.00% |
| 387 | Prescott | Linn | | 0.285 square miles (0.74 km^{2}) | 747.4/sq mi (288.6/km^{2}) | 213 | 207 | +2.90% |
| 388 | Sylvia | Reno | | 0.289 square miles (0.75 km^{2}) | 733.6/sq mi (283.2/km^{2}) | 212 | 215 | −1.40% |
| 389 | Buffalo | Wilson | | 0.318 square miles (0.82 km^{2}) | 663.5/sq mi (256.2/km^{2}) | 211 | 217 | −2.76% |
| 390 | Partridge | Reno | | 0.310 square miles (0.80 km^{2}) | 680.6/sq mi (262.8/km^{2}) | 211 | 209 | +0.96% |
| 391 | Dwight | Morris | | 0.361 square miles (0.93 km^{2}) | 582/sq mi (225/km^{2}) | 210 | 217 | −3.23% |
| 392 | Morrill | Brown | | 0.199 square miles (0.52 km^{2}) | 1,055/sq mi (407/km^{2}) | 210 | 218 | −3.67% |
| 393 | Paxico | Wabaunsee | | 0.145 square miles (0.38 km^{2}) | 1,450/sq mi (559/km^{2}) | 210 | 210 | 0.00% |
| 394 | Corning | Nemaha | | 0.304 square miles (0.79 km^{2}) | 687.5/sq mi (265.4/km^{2}) | 209 | 212 | −1.42% |
| 395 | Belvue | Pottawatomie | | 0.123 square miles (0.32 km^{2}) | 1,675/sq mi (647/km^{2}) | 206 | 177 | +16.38% |
| 396 | Toronto | Woodson | | 0.364 square miles (0.94 km^{2}) | 563.2/sq mi (217.4/km^{2}) | 205 | 206 | −0.49% |
| 397 | Beattie | Marshall | | 0.229 square miles (0.59 km^{2}) | 882/sq mi (340.6/km^{2}) | 202 | 197 | +2.54% |
| 398 | Palco | Rooks | | 0.268 square miles (0.69 km^{2}) | 754/sq mi (291.0/km^{2}) | 202 | 208 | −2.88% |
| 399 | Ford | Ford | | 0.423 square miles (1.10 km^{2}) | 475.2/sq mi (183.5/km^{2}) | 201 | 203 | −0.99% |
| 400 | Lenora | Norton | | 0.482 square miles (1.25 km^{2}) | 412.9/sq mi (159.4/km^{2}) | 199 | 207 | −3.86% |
| 401 | Mission Woods | Johnson | | 0.087 square miles (0.23 km^{2}) | 2,287/sq mi (883/km^{2}) | 199 | 203 | −1.97% |
| 402 | Bushton | Rice | | 0.228 square miles (0.59 km^{2}) | 864/sq mi (333.6/km^{2}) | 197 | 203 | −2.96% |
| 403 | Rexford | Thomas | | 0.261 square miles (0.68 km^{2}) | 755/sq mi (291.4/km^{2}) | 197 | 197 | 0.00% |
| 404 | Severy | Greenwood | | 0.490 square miles (1.27 km^{2}) | 402.0/sq mi (155.2/km^{2}) | 197 | 205 | −3.90% |
| 405 | Whiting | Jackson | | 1.007 square miles (2.61 km^{2}) | 194.6/sq mi (75.15/km^{2}) | 196 | 191 | +2.62% |
| 406 | Agra | Phillips | | 0.249 square miles (0.64 km^{2}) | 783/sq mi (302.4/km^{2}) | 195 | 208 | −6.25% |
| 407 | Mullinville | Kiowa | | 0.641 square miles (1.66 km^{2}) | 302.7/sq mi (116.9/km^{2}) | 194 | 197 | −1.52% |
| 408 | Tipton | Mitchell | | 0.252 square miles (0.65 km^{2}) | 770/sq mi (297.2/km^{2}) | 194 | 193 | +0.52% |
| 409 | Walnut | Crawford | | 1.474 square miles (3.82 km^{2}) | 127.5/sq mi (49.25/km^{2}) | 188 | 187 | +0.53% |
| 410 | Pawnee Rock | Barton | | 0.283 square miles (0.73 km^{2}) | 657.2/sq mi (253.8/km^{2}) | 186 | 193 | −3.63% |
| 411 | Reading | Lyon | | 0.213 square miles (0.55 km^{2}) | 864/sq mi (333.5/km^{2}) | 184 | 181 | +1.66% |
| 412 | Winona | Logan | | 0.261 square miles (0.68 km^{2}) | 705/sq mi (272.2/km^{2}) | 184 | 193 | −4.66% |
| 413 | Lebanon | Smith | | 0.322 square miles (0.83 km^{2}) | 562.1/sq mi (217.0/km^{2}) | 181 | 178 | +1.69% |
| 414 | Morganville | Clay | | 0.339 square miles (0.88 km^{2}) | 533.9/sq mi (206.1/km^{2}) | 181 | 180 | +0.56% |
| 415 | Selden | Sheridan | | 0.303 square miles (0.78 km^{2}) | 597.4/sq mi (230.6/km^{2}) | 181 | 184 | −1.63% |
| 416 | Hamilton | Greenwood | | 0.312 square miles (0.81 km^{2}) | 573.7/sq mi (221.5/km^{2}) | 179 | 182 | −1.65% |
| 417 | Harveyville | Wabaunsee | | 0.135 square miles (0.35 km^{2}) | 1,319/sq mi (509/km^{2}) | 178 | 178 | 0.00% |
| 418 | Rantoul | Franklin | | 0.147 square miles (0.38 km^{2}) | 1,184/sq mi (457.0/km^{2}) | 174 | 165 | +5.45% |
| 419 | Robinson | Brown | | 0.229 square miles (0.59 km^{2}) | 755/sq mi (291.7/km^{2}) | 173 | 183 | −5.46% |
| 420 | Emmett | Pottawatomie | | 0.195 square miles (0.51 km^{2}) | 872/sq mi (337/km^{2}) | 170 | 170 | 0.00% |
| 421 | Schoenchen | Ellis | | 0.124 square miles (0.32 km^{2}) | 1,370/sq mi (529/km^{2}) | 170 | 170 | 0.00% |
| 422 | Bison | Rush | | 0.265 square miles (0.69 km^{2}) | 637.7/sq mi (246.2/km^{2}) | 169 | 179 | −5.59% |
| 423 | Fulton | Bourbon | | 0.192 square miles (0.50 km^{2}) | 880/sq mi (339.9/km^{2}) | 169 | 165 | +2.42% |
| 424 | Lincolnville | Marion | | 0.225 square miles (0.58 km^{2}) | 751/sq mi (290.0/km^{2}) | 169 | 168 | +0.60% |
| 425 | Tyro | Montgomery | | 0.457 square miles (1.18 km^{2}) | 369.8/sq mi (142.8/km^{2}) | 169 | 177 | −4.52% |
| 426 | Allen | Lyon | | 0.276 square miles (0.71 km^{2}) | 597.8/sq mi (230.8/km^{2}) | 165 | 160 | +3.13% |
| 427 | Ensign | Gray | | 0.291 square miles (0.75 km^{2}) | 563.6/sq mi (217.6/km^{2}) | 164 | 166 | −1.20% |
| 428 | Atlanta | Cowley | | 0.479 square miles (1.24 km^{2}) | 340.3/sq mi (131.4/km^{2}) | 163 | 168 | −2.98% |
| 429 | Barnes | Washington | | 0.170 square miles (0.44 km^{2}) | 959/sq mi (370.2/km^{2}) | 163 | 165 | −1.21% |
| 430 | Hardtner | Barber | | 0.275 square miles (0.71 km^{2}) | 592.7/sq mi (228.9/km^{2}) | 163 | 167 | −2.40% |
| 431 | Offerle | Edwards | | 0.275 square miles (0.71 km^{2}) | 592.7/sq mi (228.9/km^{2}) | 163 | 179 | −8.94% |
| 432 | Bern | Nemaha | | 0.284 square miles (0.74 km^{2}) | 570.4/sq mi (220.2/km^{2}) | 162 | 161 | +0.62% |
| 433 | Woodbine | Dickinson | | 0.159 square miles (0.41 km^{2}) | 1,019/sq mi (393.4/km^{2}) | 162 | 157 | +3.18% |
| 434 | Norcatur | Decatur | | 0.996 square miles (2.58 km^{2}) | 161/sq mi (62.0/km^{2}) | 160 | 159 | +0.63% |
| 435 | Smolan | Saline | | 0.111 square miles (0.29 km^{2}) | 1,440/sq mi (557/km^{2}) | 160 | 162 | −1.23% |
| 436 | Lehigh | Marion | | 0.322 square miles (0.83 km^{2}) | 493.8/sq mi (190.7/km^{2}) | 159 | 161 | −1.24% |
| 437 | Luray | Russell | | 0.332 square miles (0.86 km^{2}) | 475.9/sq mi (183.7/km^{2}) | 158 | 166 | −4.82% |
| 438 | Randolph | Riley | | 0.275 square miles (0.71 km^{2}) | 574.5/sq mi (221.8/km^{2}) | 158 | 159 | −0.63% |
| 439 | Muscotah | Atchison | | 0.333 square miles (0.86 km^{2}) | 468.5/sq mi (180.9/km^{2}) | 156 | 155 | +0.65% |
| 440 | Circleville | Jackson | | 0.253 square miles (0.66 km^{2}) | 609/sq mi (235.0/km^{2}) | 154 | 153 | +0.65% |
| 441 | Geuda Springs | Sumner | Cowley | 0.344 square miles (0.89 km^{2}) | 447.7/sq mi (172.8/km^{2}) | 154 | 158 | −2.53% |
| 442 | Delia | Jackson | | 0.115 square miles (0.30 km^{2}) | 1,330/sq mi (514/km^{2}) | 153 | 151 | +1.32% |
| 443 | Iuka | Pratt | | 0.657 square miles (1.70 km^{2}) | 231.4/sq mi (89.3/km^{2}) | 152 | 151 | +0.66% |
| 444 | Louisville | Pottawatomie | | 0.499 square miles (1.29 km^{2}) | 304.6/sq mi (117.6/km^{2}) | 152 | 131 | +16.03% |
| 445 | Kanorado | Sherman | | 0.261 square miles (0.68 km^{2}) | 575/sq mi (222/km^{2}) | 150 | 153 | −1.96% |
| 446 | Grenola | Elk | | 0.465 square miles (1.20 km^{2}) | 320.4/sq mi (123.7/km^{2}) | 149 | 151 | −1.32% |
| 447 | Bogue | Graham | | 0.259 square miles (0.67 km^{2}) | 571.4/sq mi (220.6/km^{2}) | 148 | 155 | −4.52% |
| 448 | Denison | Jackson | | 0.112 square miles (0.29 km^{2}) | 1,313/sq mi (507/km^{2}) | 147 | 146 | +0.68% |
| 449 | McCracken | Rush | | 0.997 square miles (2.58 km^{2}) | 147.4/sq mi (56.93/km^{2}) | 147 | 152 | −3.29% |
| 450 | West Mineral | Cherokee | | 0.337 square miles (0.87 km^{2}) | 436.2/sq mi (168.4/km^{2}) | 147 | 154 | −4.55% |
| 451 | Garfield | Pawnee | | 0.538 square miles (1.39 km^{2}) | 265.8/sq mi (102.6/km^{2}) | 143 | 151 | −5.30% |
| 452 | Sharon | Barber | | 0.281 square miles (0.73 km^{2}) | 508.9/sq mi (196.5/km^{2}) | 143 | 147 | −2.72% |
| 453 | Galesburg | Neosho | | 0.171 square miles (0.44 km^{2}) | 830/sq mi (320.6/km^{2}) | 142 | 149 | −4.70% |
| 454 | Dorrance | Russell | | 0.339 square miles (0.88 km^{2}) | 415.9/sq mi (160.6/km^{2}) | 141 | 146 | −3.42% |
| 455 | Netawaka | Jackson | | 0.968 square miles (2.51 km^{2}) | 145.7/sq mi (56.24/km^{2}) | 141 | 139 | +1.44% |
| 456 | Burr Oak | Jewell | | 0.823 square miles (2.13 km^{2}) | 168.9/sq mi (65.21/km^{2}) | 139 | 140 | −0.71% |
| 457 | Wilsey | Morris | | 0.270 square miles (0.70 km^{2}) | 514.8/sq mi (198.8/km^{2}) | 139 | 139 | 0.00% |
| 458 | Neosho Falls | Woodson | | 0.507 square miles (1.31 km^{2}) | 272.2/sq mi (105.1/km^{2}) | 138 | 134 | +2.99% |
| 459 | Admire | Lyon | | 0.323 square miles (0.84 km^{2}) | 424.1/sq mi (163.8/km^{2}) | 137 | 130 | +5.38% |
| 460 | Cuba | Republic | | 0.288 square miles (0.75 km^{2}) | 475.7/sq mi (183.7/km^{2}) | 137 | 140 | −2.14% |
| 461 | Beverly | Lincoln | | 0.199 square miles (0.52 km^{2}) | 678/sq mi (261.9/km^{2}) | 135 | 135 | 0.00% |
| 462 | Denton | Doniphan | | 0.145 square miles (0.38 km^{2}) | 917/sq mi (354.1/km^{2}) | 133 | 130 | +2.31% |
| 463 | Rush Center | Rush | | 0.361 square miles (0.93 km^{2}) | 365.7/sq mi (141.2/km^{2}) | 132 | 141 | −6.38% |
| 464 | Westphalia | Anderson | | 0.198 square miles (0.51 km^{2}) | 667/sq mi (257.4/km^{2}) | 132 | 128 | +3.13% |
| 465 | Long Island | Phillips | | 0.411 square miles (1.06 km^{2}) | 318.7/sq mi (123.1/km^{2}) | 131 | 137 | −4.38% |
| 466 | Manter | Stanton | | 0.249 square miles (0.64 km^{2}) | 526.1/sq mi (203.1/km^{2}) | 131 | 132 | −0.76% |
| 467 | Havensville | Pottawatomie | | 0.145 square miles (0.38 km^{2}) | 900/sq mi (346/km^{2}) | 130 | 119 | +9.24% |
| 468 | Lorraine | Ellsworth | | 0.253 square miles (0.66 km^{2}) | 514/sq mi (198/km^{2}) | 130 | 137 | −5.11% |
| 469 | Kirwin | Phillips | | 0.915 square miles (2.37 km^{2}) | 141.0/sq mi (54.43/km^{2}) | 129 | 139 | −7.19% |
| 470 | Fall River | Greenwood | | 0.220 square miles (0.57 km^{2}) | 577/sq mi (222.9/km^{2}) | 127 | 131 | −3.05% |
| 471 | Palmer | Washington | | 0.309 square miles (0.80 km^{2}) | 407.8/sq mi (157.4/km^{2}) | 126 | 125 | +0.80% |
| 472 | Summerfield | Marshall | | 0.345 square miles (0.89 km^{2}) | 359.4/sq mi (138.8/km^{2}) | 124 | 125 | −0.80% |
| 473 | Albert | Barton | | 0.235 square miles (0.61 km^{2}) | 523/sq mi (202.1/km^{2}) | 123 | 132 | −6.82% |
| 474 | Preston | Pratt | | 0.435 square miles (1.13 km^{2}) | 271.3/sq mi (104.7/km^{2}) | 118 | 115 | +2.61% |
| 475 | Alden | Rice | | 0.155 square miles (0.40 km^{2}) | 748/sq mi (289.0/km^{2}) | 116 | 122 | −4.92% |
| 476 | Morrowville | Washington | | 0.143 square miles (0.37 km^{2}) | 811/sq mi (313.2/km^{2}) | 116 | 114 | +1.75% |
| 477 | Culver | Ottawa | | 0.178 square miles (0.46 km^{2}) | 646/sq mi (249.4/km^{2}) | 115 | 114 | +0.88% |
| 478 | McDonald | Rawlins | | 0.219 square miles (0.57 km^{2}) | 525/sq mi (202.7/km^{2}) | 115 | 113 | +1.77% |
| 479 | White Cloud | Doniphan | | 0.724 square miles (1.88 km^{2}) | 158.8/sq mi (61.33/km^{2}) | 115 | 115 | 0.00% |
| 480 | Herndon | Rawlins | | 0.315 square miles (0.82 km^{2}) | 361.9/sq mi (139.7/km^{2}) | 114 | 119 | −4.20% |
| 481 | Morland | Graham | | 0.478 square miles (1.24 km^{2}) | 236.4/sq mi (91.3/km^{2}) | 113 | 115 | −1.74% |
| 482 | Viola | Sedgwick | | 0.164 square miles (0.42 km^{2}) | 689/sq mi (266.0/km^{2}) | 113 | 115 | −1.74% |
| 483 | Park | Gove | | 0.315 square miles (0.82 km^{2}) | 355.6/sq mi (137.3/km^{2}) | 112 | 112 | 0.00% |
| 484 | Chautauqua | Chautauqua | | 0.424 square miles (1.10 km^{2}) | 259/sq mi (100/km^{2}) | 110 | 108 | +1.85% |
| 485 | Bunker Hill | Russell | | 1.387 square miles (3.59 km^{2}) | 77.9/sq mi (30.06/km^{2}) | 108 | 103 | +4.85% |
| 486 | Elk Falls | Elk | | 0.727 square miles (1.88 km^{2}) | 148.6/sq mi (57.36/km^{2}) | 108 | 113 | −4.42% |
| 487 | Haddam | Washington | | 0.343 square miles (0.89 km^{2}) | 314.9/sq mi (121.6/km^{2}) | 108 | 110 | −1.82% |
| 488 | New Cambria | Saline | | 0.178 square miles (0.46 km^{2}) | 607/sq mi (234.3/km^{2}) | 108 | 106 | +1.89% |
| 489 | Damar | Rooks | | 0.191 square miles (0.49 km^{2}) | 560/sq mi (216.3/km^{2}) | 107 | 112 | −4.46% |
| 490 | Kincaid | Anderson | | 0.500 square miles (1.29 km^{2}) | 214.0/sq mi (82.6/km^{2}) | 107 | 103 | +3.88% |
| 491 | Cassoday | Butler | | 0.342 square miles (0.89 km^{2}) | 309.9/sq mi (119.7/km^{2}) | 106 | 113 | −6.19% |
| 492 | Wheaton | Pottawatomie | | 0.154 square miles (0.40 km^{2}) | 688/sq mi (265.8/km^{2}) | 106 | 98 | +8.16% |
| 493 | Tampa | Marion | | 0.178 square miles (0.46 km^{2}) | 590/sq mi (227.8/km^{2}) | 105 | 105 | 0.00% |
| 494 | Soldier | Jackson | | 0.147 square miles (0.38 km^{2}) | 707/sq mi (273.2/km^{2}) | 104 | 102 | +1.96% |
| 495 | Goff | Nemaha | | 0.206 square miles (0.53 km^{2}) | 500/sq mi (193.1/km^{2}) | 103 | 106 | −2.83% |
| 496 | Peru | Chautauqua | | 0.324 square miles (0.84 km^{2}) | 311.7/sq mi (120.4/km^{2}) | 101 | 101 | 0.00% |
| 497 | Prairie View | Phillips | | 0.147 square miles (0.38 km^{2}) | 673/sq mi (260.0/km^{2}) | 99 | 106 | −6.60% |
| 498 | Latham | Butler | | 0.217 square miles (0.56 km^{2}) | 452/sq mi (174.4/km^{2}) | 98 | 96 | +2.08% |
| 499 | Mapleton | Bourbon | | 0.496 square miles (1.28 km^{2}) | 197.6/sq mi (76.3/km^{2}) | 98 | 96 | +2.08% |
| 500 | Munden | Republic | | 0.186 square miles (0.48 km^{2}) | 527/sq mi (203.4/km^{2}) | 98 | 96 | +2.08% |
| 501 | Utica | Ness | | 0.244 square miles (0.63 km^{2}) | 397.5/sq mi (153.5/km^{2}) | 97 | 99 | −2.02% |
| 502 | Rozel | Pawnee | | 0.193 square miles (0.50 km^{2}) | 497/sq mi (192.1/km^{2}) | 96 | 102 | −5.88% |
| 503 | Gem | Thomas | | 0.334 square miles (0.87 km^{2}) | 284.4/sq mi (109.8/km^{2}) | 95 | 98 | −3.06% |
| 504 | Liberty | Montgomery | | 0.251 square miles (0.65 km^{2}) | 378.5/sq mi (146.1/km^{2}) | 95 | 99 | −4.04% |
| 505 | Collyer | Trego | | 0.234 square miles (0.61 km^{2}) | 401.7/sq mi (155.1/km^{2}) | 94 | 97 | −3.09% |
| 506 | Alton | Osborne | | 0.309 square miles (0.80 km^{2}) | 301.0/sq mi (116.2/km^{2}) | 93 | 100 | −7.00% |
| 507 | Cambridge | Cowley | | 0.175 square miles (0.45 km^{2}) | 526/sq mi (203.0/km^{2}) | 92 | 92 | 0.00% |
| 508 | Green | Clay | | 0.195 square miles (0.51 km^{2}) | 472/sq mi (182.2/km^{2}) | 92 | 95 | −3.16% |
| 509 | Hepler | Crawford | | 0.999 square miles (2.59 km^{2}) | 92.1/sq mi (35.56/km^{2}) | 92 | 90 | +2.22% |
| 510 | Redfield | Bourbon | | 0.145 square miles (0.38 km^{2}) | 634/sq mi (245.0/km^{2}) | 92 | 90 | +2.22% |
| 511 | Belpre | Edwards | | 0.411 square miles (1.06 km^{2}) | 221.4/sq mi (85.5/km^{2}) | 91 | 97 | −6.19% |
| 512 | Formoso | Jewell | | 0.247 square miles (0.64 km^{2}) | 368.4/sq mi (142.2/km^{2}) | 91 | 94 | −3.19% |
| 513 | Horace | Greeley | | 0.245 square miles (0.63 km^{2}) | 371.4/sq mi (143.4/km^{2}) | 91 | 102 | −10.78% |
| 514 | Hudson | Stafford | | 0.125 square miles (0.32 km^{2}) | 728/sq mi (281.1/km^{2}) | 91 | 95 | −4.21% |
| 515 | Olmitz | Barton | | 0.159 square miles (0.41 km^{2}) | 570/sq mi (219/km^{2}) | 90 | 90 | 0.00% |
| 516 | Windom | McPherson | | 0.201 square miles (0.52 km^{2}) | 448/sq mi (173/km^{2}) | 90 | 85 | +5.88% |
| 517 | Liebenthal | Rush | | 0.112 square miles (0.29 km^{2}) | 795/sq mi (306.8/km^{2}) | 89 | 92 | −3.26% |
| 518 | Niotaze | Chautauqua | | 0.370 square miles (0.96 km^{2}) | 240.5/sq mi (92.9/km^{2}) | 89 | 90 | −1.11% |
| 519 | Sawyer | Pratt | | 0.180 square miles (0.47 km^{2}) | 494/sq mi (190.9/km^{2}) | 89 | 89 | 0.00% |
| 520 | Woodston | Rooks | | 0.214 square miles (0.55 km^{2}) | 416/sq mi (160.6/km^{2}) | 89 | 94 | −5.32% |
| 521 | Durham | Marion | | 0.174 square miles (0.45 km^{2}) | 506/sq mi (195.3/km^{2}) | 88 | 89 | −1.12% |
| 522 | Cullison | Pratt | | 0.167 square miles (0.43 km^{2}) | 503/sq mi (194.2/km^{2}) | 84 | 83 | +1.20% |
| 523 | Gaylord | Smith | | 0.261 square miles (0.68 km^{2}) | 321.8/sq mi (124.3/km^{2}) | 84 | 87 | −3.45% |
| 524 | Plevna | Reno | | 0.225 square miles (0.58 km^{2}) | 373.3/sq mi (144.1/km^{2}) | 84 | 85 | −1.18% |
| 525 | Portis | Osborne | | 0.261 square miles (0.68 km^{2}) | 321.8/sq mi (124.3/km^{2}) | 84 | 86 | −2.33% |
| 526 | Randall | Jewell | | 0.174 square miles (0.45 km^{2}) | 483/sq mi (186.4/km^{2}) | 84 | 79 | +6.33% |
| 527 | Havana | Montgomery | | 0.157 square miles (0.41 km^{2}) | 529/sq mi (204.1/km^{2}) | 83 | 84 | −1.19% |
| 528 | Zurich | Rooks | | 0.180 square miles (0.47 km^{2}) | 461/sq mi (178.0/km^{2}) | 83 | 89 | −6.74% |
| 529 | Republic | Republic | | 0.233 square miles (0.60 km^{2}) | 351.9/sq mi (135.9/km^{2}) | 82 | 82 | 0.00% |
| 530 | Simpson | Mitchell | Cloud | 0.257 square miles (0.67 km^{2}) | 319.1/sq mi (123.2/km^{2}) | 82 | 82 | 0.00% |
| 531 | Abbyville | Reno | | 0.268 square miles (0.69 km^{2}) | 302.2/sq mi (116.7/km^{2}) | 81 | 83 | −2.41% |
| 532 | Hazelton | Barber | | 0.593 square miles (1.54 km^{2}) | 136.6/sq mi (52.7/km^{2}) | 81 | 82 | −1.22% |
| 533 | Raymond | Rice | | 0.310 square miles (0.80 km^{2}) | 261.3/sq mi (100.9/km^{2}) | 81 | 85 | −4.71% |
| 534 | Narka | Republic | | 0.160 square miles (0.41 km^{2}) | 500/sq mi (193/km^{2}) | 80 | 81 | −1.23% |
| 535 | Jennings | Decatur | | 0.268 square miles (0.69 km^{2}) | 294.8/sq mi (113.8/km^{2}) | 79 | 81 | −2.47% |
| 536 | Ramona | Marion | | 0.291 square miles (0.75 km^{2}) | 271.5/sq mi (104.8/km^{2}) | 79 | 78 | +1.28% |
| 537 | Severance | Doniphan | | 0.140 square miles (0.36 km^{2}) | 564/sq mi (217.9/km^{2}) | 79 | 76 | +3.95% |
| 538 | Coolidge | Hamilton | | 0.431 square miles (1.12 km^{2}) | 181.0/sq mi (69.9/km^{2}) | 78 | 80 | −2.50% |
| 539 | Gove City | Gove | | 0.243 square miles (0.63 km^{2}) | 312.8/sq mi (120.8/km^{2}) | 76 | 80 | −5.00% |
| 540 | Savonburg | Allen | | 0.192 square miles (0.50 km^{2}) | 396/sq mi (152.8/km^{2}) | 76 | 74 | +2.70% |
| 541 | Vermillion | Marshall | | 0.208 square miles (0.54 km^{2}) | 365/sq mi (141.1/km^{2}) | 76 | 76 | 0.00% |
| 542 | Huron | Atchison | | 0.072 square miles (0.19 km^{2}) | 1,028/sq mi (397/km^{2}) | 74 | 74 | 0.00% |
| 543 | Olivet | Osage | | 0.252 square miles (0.65 km^{2}) | 293.7/sq mi (113.4/km^{2}) | 74 | 73 | +1.37% |
| 544 | Roseland | Cherokee | | 0.731 square miles (1.89 km^{2}) | 101.2/sq mi (39.09/km^{2}) | 74 | 76 | −2.63% |
| 545 | Mayfield | Sumner | | 0.296 square miles (0.77 km^{2}) | 246.6/sq mi (95.2/km^{2}) | 73 | 75 | −2.67% |
| 546 | Benedict | Wilson | | 0.146 square miles (0.38 km^{2}) | 486/sq mi (187.8/km^{2}) | 71 | 69 | +2.90% |
| 547 | Longford | Clay | | 0.142 square miles (0.37 km^{2}) | 500/sq mi (193.1/km^{2}) | 71 | 73 | −2.74% |
| 548 | Willowbrook | Reno | | 0.295 square miles (0.76 km^{2}) | 237/sq mi (92/km^{2}) | 70 | 71 | −1.41% |
| 549 | Esbon | Jewell | | 0.281 square miles (0.73 km^{2}) | 245.6/sq mi (94.8/km^{2}) | 69 | 69 | 0.00% |
| 550 | Reserve | Brown | | 0.115 square miles (0.30 km^{2}) | 600/sq mi (231.7/km^{2}) | 69 | 67 | +2.99% |
| 551 | Bartlett | Labette | | 0.133 square miles (0.34 km^{2}) | 511/sq mi (197.4/km^{2}) | 68 | 69 | −1.45% |
| 552 | Willard | Shawnee | | 0.109 square miles (0.28 km^{2}) | 624/sq mi (240.9/km^{2}) | 68 | 74 | −8.11% |
| 553 | Coats | Pratt | | 0.227 square miles (0.59 km^{2}) | 295.2/sq mi (114.0/km^{2}) | 67 | 68 | −1.47% |
| 554 | Powhattan | Brown | | 0.137 square miles (0.35 km^{2}) | 489/sq mi (188.8/km^{2}) | 67 | 69 | −2.90% |
| 555 | Stark | Neosho | | 0.164 square miles (0.42 km^{2}) | 402/sq mi (155.4/km^{2}) | 66 | 69 | −4.35% |
| 556 | Zenda | Kingman | | 0.223 square miles (0.58 km^{2}) | 296.0/sq mi (114.3/km^{2}) | 66 | 72 | −8.33% |
| 557 | Isabel | Barber | | 0.250 square miles (0.65 km^{2}) | 256.0/sq mi (98.8/km^{2}) | 64 | 68 | −5.88% |
| 558 | Oketo | Marshall | | 0.103 square miles (0.27 km^{2}) | 592/sq mi (228.7/km^{2}) | 61 | 64 | −4.69% |
| 559 | New Albany | Wilson | | 0.185 square miles (0.48 km^{2}) | 319/sq mi (123.1/km^{2}) | 59 | 57 | +3.51% |
| 560 | Barnard | Lincoln | | 0.223 square miles (0.58 km^{2}) | 260.1/sq mi (100.4/km^{2}) | 58 | 64 | −9.37% |
| 561 | Earlton | Neosho | | 0.160 square miles (0.41 km^{2}) | 363/sq mi (140.0/km^{2}) | 58 | 60 | −3.33% |
| 562 | Oneida | Nemaha | | 0.230 square miles (0.60 km^{2}) | 252.2/sq mi (97.4/km^{2}) | 58 | 61 | −4.92% |
| 563 | Coyville | Wilson | | 0.269 square miles (0.70 km^{2}) | 208.2/sq mi (80.4/km^{2}) | 56 | 60 | −6.67% |
| 564 | Elgin | Chautauqua | | 0.195 square miles (0.51 km^{2}) | 287/sq mi (110.9/km^{2}) | 56 | 60 | −6.67% |
| 565 | Lost Springs | Marion | | 0.222 square miles (0.57 km^{2}) | 252.3/sq mi (97.4/km^{2}) | 56 | 55 | +1.82% |
| 566 | Spivey | Kingman | | 0.521 square miles (1.35 km^{2}) | 107.5/sq mi (41.5/km^{2}) | 56 | 61 | −8.20% |
| 567 | Labette | Labette | | 0.224 square miles (0.58 km^{2}) | 245.5/sq mi (94.8/km^{2}) | 55 | 50 | +10.00% |
| 568 | Aurora | Cloud | | 0.101 square miles (0.26 km^{2}) | 515/sq mi (198.8/km^{2}) | 52 | 56 | −7.14% |
| 569 | Elsmore | Allen | | 0.152 square miles (0.39 km^{2}) | 342/sq mi (132.1/km^{2}) | 52 | 50 | +4.00% |
| 570 | Englewood | Clark | | 1.128 square miles (2.92 km^{2}) | 46.1/sq mi (17.80/km^{2}) | 52 | 58 | −10.34% |
| 571 | Glade | Phillips | | 0.268 square miles (0.69 km^{2}) | 194.0/sq mi (74.9/km^{2}) | 52 | 52 | 0.00% |
| 572 | Milan | Sumner | | 0.132 square miles (0.34 km^{2}) | 394/sq mi (152.1/km^{2}) | 52 | 56 | −7.14% |
| 573 | Manchester | Dickinson | | 0.160 square miles (0.41 km^{2}) | 319/sq mi (123.1/km^{2}) | 51 | 47 | +8.51% |
| 574 | Hunter | Mitchell | | 0.210 square miles (0.54 km^{2}) | 238/sq mi (92/km^{2}) | 50 | 51 | −1.96% |
| 575 | Matfield Green | Chase | | 0.142 square miles (0.37 km^{2}) | 350/sq mi (136/km^{2}) | 50 | 49 | +2.04% |
| 576 | Nashville | Kingman | | 0.205 square miles (0.53 km^{2}) | 244/sq mi (94/km^{2}) | 50 | 54 | −7.41% |
| 577 | Alexander | Rush | | 0.259 square miles (0.67 km^{2}) | 185.3/sq mi (71.6/km^{2}) | 48 | 54 | −11.11% |
| 578 | Parkerville | Morris | | 0.128 square miles (0.33 km^{2}) | 367/sq mi (141.8/km^{2}) | 47 | 46 | +2.17% |
| 579 | Virgil | Greenwood | | 0.560 square miles (1.45 km^{2}) | 83.9/sq mi (32.4/km^{2}) | 47 | 48 | −2.08% |
| 580 | Climax | Greenwood | | 0.120 square miles (0.31 km^{2}) | 375/sq mi (144.8/km^{2}) | 45 | 45 | 0.00% |
| 581 | Galatia | Barton | | 0.355 square miles (0.92 km^{2}) | 126.8/sq mi (48.9/km^{2}) | 45 | 45 | 0.00% |
| 582 | Wallace | Wallace | | 0.402 square miles (1.04 km^{2}) | 111.9/sq mi (43.2/km^{2}) | 45 | 41 | +9.76% |
| 583 | Agenda | Republic | | 0.173 square miles (0.45 km^{2}) | 254/sq mi (98.2/km^{2}) | 44 | 47 | −6.38% |
| 584 | Bluff City | Harper | | 0.506 square miles (1.31 km^{2}) | 87.0/sq mi (33.6/km^{2}) | 44 | 45 | −2.22% |
| 585 | Langdon | Reno | | 0.099 square miles (0.26 km^{2}) | 444/sq mi (171.6/km^{2}) | 44 | 39 | +12.82% |
| 586 | Mahaska | Washington | | 0.223 square miles (0.58 km^{2}) | 197.3/sq mi (76.2/km^{2}) | 44 | 46 | −4.35% |
| 587 | Dresden | Decatur | | 0.902 square miles (2.34 km^{2}) | 47.7/sq mi (18.41/km^{2}) | 43 | 43 | 0.00% |
| 588 | Hunnewell | Sumner | | 0.556 square miles (1.44 km^{2}) | 77.3/sq mi (29.9/km^{2}) | 43 | 44 | −2.27% |
| 589 | Clayton | Norton | Decatur | 0.421 square miles (1.09 km^{2}) | 99.8/sq mi (38.5/km^{2}) | 42 | 44 | −4.55% |
| 590 | Athol | Smith | | 0.185 square miles (0.48 km^{2}) | 222/sq mi (85.6/km^{2}) | 41 | 41 | 0.00% |
| 591 | Seward | Stafford | | 0.257 square miles (0.67 km^{2}) | 159.5/sq mi (61.6/km^{2}) | 41 | 41 | 0.00% |
| 592 | Elmdale | Chase | | 0.165 square miles (0.43 km^{2}) | 242/sq mi (94/km^{2}) | 40 | 40 | 0.00% |
| 593 | Vining | Washington | Clay | 0.214 square miles (0.55 km^{2}) | 182.2/sq mi (70.4/km^{2}) | 39 | 43 | −9.30% |
| 594 | Carlton | Dickinson | | 0.170 square miles (0.44 km^{2}) | 224/sq mi (86.3/km^{2}) | 38 | 40 | −5.00% |
| 595 | Byers | Pratt | | 0.169 square miles (0.44 km^{2}) | 219/sq mi (84.5/km^{2}) | 37 | 38 | −2.63% |
| 596 | Leona | Doniphan | | 0.063 square miles (0.16 km^{2}) | 571/sq mi (221/km^{2}) | 36 | 41 | −12.20% |
| 597 | Speed | Phillips | | 0.149 square miles (0.39 km^{2}) | 242/sq mi (93.3/km^{2}) | 36 | 37 | −2.70% |
| 598 | Hamlin | Brown | | 0.087 square miles (0.23 km^{2}) | 402/sq mi (155.3/km^{2}) | 35 | 25 | +40.00% |
| 599 | Paradise | Russell | | 0.247 square miles (0.64 km^{2}) | 137.7/sq mi (53.1/km^{2}) | 34 | 35 | −2.86% |
| 600 | Timken | Rush | | 0.129 square miles (0.33 km^{2}) | 264/sq mi (101.8/km^{2}) | 34 | 38 | −10.53% |
| 601 | Wilmore | Comanche | | 0.177 square miles (0.46 km^{2}) | 192/sq mi (74.2/km^{2}) | 34 | 37 | −8.11% |
| 602 | Sun City | Barber | | 0.146 square miles (0.38 km^{2}) | 226/sq mi (87.3/km^{2}) | 33 | 37 | −10.81% |
| 603 | Waldo | Russell | | 0.376 square miles (0.97 km^{2}) | 85.1/sq mi (32.9/km^{2}) | 32 | 30 | +6.67% |
| 604 | Webber | Jewell | | 0.116 square miles (0.30 km^{2}) | 267/sq mi (103.2/km^{2}) | 31 | 30 | +3.33% |
| 605 | Latimer | Morris | | 0.060 square miles (0.16 km^{2}) | 500/sq mi (190/km^{2}) | 30 | 31 | −3.23% |
| 606 | Menlo | Thomas | | 0.117 square miles (0.30 km^{2}) | 260/sq mi (99/km^{2}) | 30 | 33 | −9.09% |
| 607 | Danville | Harper | | 0.083 square miles (0.21 km^{2}) | 349/sq mi (134.9/km^{2}) | 29 | 29 | 0.00% |
| 608 | Susank | Barton | | 0.099 square miles (0.26 km^{2}) | 293/sq mi (113.1/km^{2}) | 29 | 31 | −6.45% |
| 609 | Bushong | Lyon | | 0.152 square miles (0.39 km^{2}) | 184/sq mi (71.1/km^{2}) | 28 | 27 | +3.70% |
| 610 | Dunlap | Morris | | 0.246 square miles (0.64 km^{2}) | 113.8/sq mi (43.9/km^{2}) | 28 | 27 | +3.70% |
| 611 | Willis | Brown | | 0.164 square miles (0.42 km^{2}) | 171/sq mi (65.9/km^{2}) | 28 | 24 | +16.67% |
| 612 | Edmond | Norton | | 0.166 square miles (0.43 km^{2}) | 163/sq mi (62.8/km^{2}) | 27 | 28 | −3.57% |
| 613 | Richfield | Morton | | 1.003 square miles (2.60 km^{2}) | 26.9/sq mi (10.39/km^{2}) | 27 | 30 | −10.00% |
| 614 | Russell Springs | Logan | | 0.707 square miles (1.83 km^{2}) | 38.2/sq mi (14.75/km^{2}) | 27 | 26 | +3.85% |
| 615 | Scottsville | Mitchell | | 0.252 square miles (0.65 km^{2}) | 103.2/sq mi (39.8/km^{2}) | 26 | 26 | 0.00% |
| 616 | Oak Hill | Clay | | 0.051 square miles (0.13 km^{2}) | 490/sq mi (189/km^{2}) | 25 | 24 | +4.17% |
| 617 | Brownell | Ness | | 0.198 square miles (0.51 km^{2}) | 116.2/sq mi (44.9/km^{2}) | 23 | 23 | 0.00% |
| 618 | Bassett | Allen | | 0.067 square miles (0.17 km^{2}) | 328/sq mi (127/km^{2}) | 22 | 20 | +10.00% |
| 619 | Lone Elm | Anderson | | 0.068 square miles (0.18 km^{2}) | 324/sq mi (125/km^{2}) | 22 | 27 | −18.52% |
| 620 | Radium | Stafford | | 0.041 square miles (0.11 km^{2}) | 537/sq mi (207/km^{2}) | 22 | 26 | −15.38% |
| 621 | Cedar Point | Chase | | 0.068 square miles (0.18 km^{2}) | 290/sq mi (114/km^{2}) | 20 | 22 | −9.09% |
| 622 | Penalosa | Kingman | | 0.103 square miles (0.27 km^{2}) | 165/sq mi (63.7/km^{2}) | 17 | 18 | −5.56% |
| 623 | Cedar | Smith | | 0.178 square miles (0.46 km^{2}) | 73.0/sq mi (28.2/km^{2}) | 13 | 11 | +18.18% |
| 624 | Hollenberg | Washington | | 0.073 square miles (0.19 km^{2}) | 164/sq mi (63.5/km^{2}) | 12 | 10 | +20.00% |
| 625 | Waldron | Harper | | 0.311 square miles (0.81 km^{2}) | 28.9/sq mi (11.2/km^{2}) | 9 | 9 | 0.00% |
| 626 | Frederick | Rice | | 0.192 square miles (0.50 km^{2}) | 41.7/sq mi (16.1/km^{2}) | 8 | 8 | 0.00% |

== Military installations ==
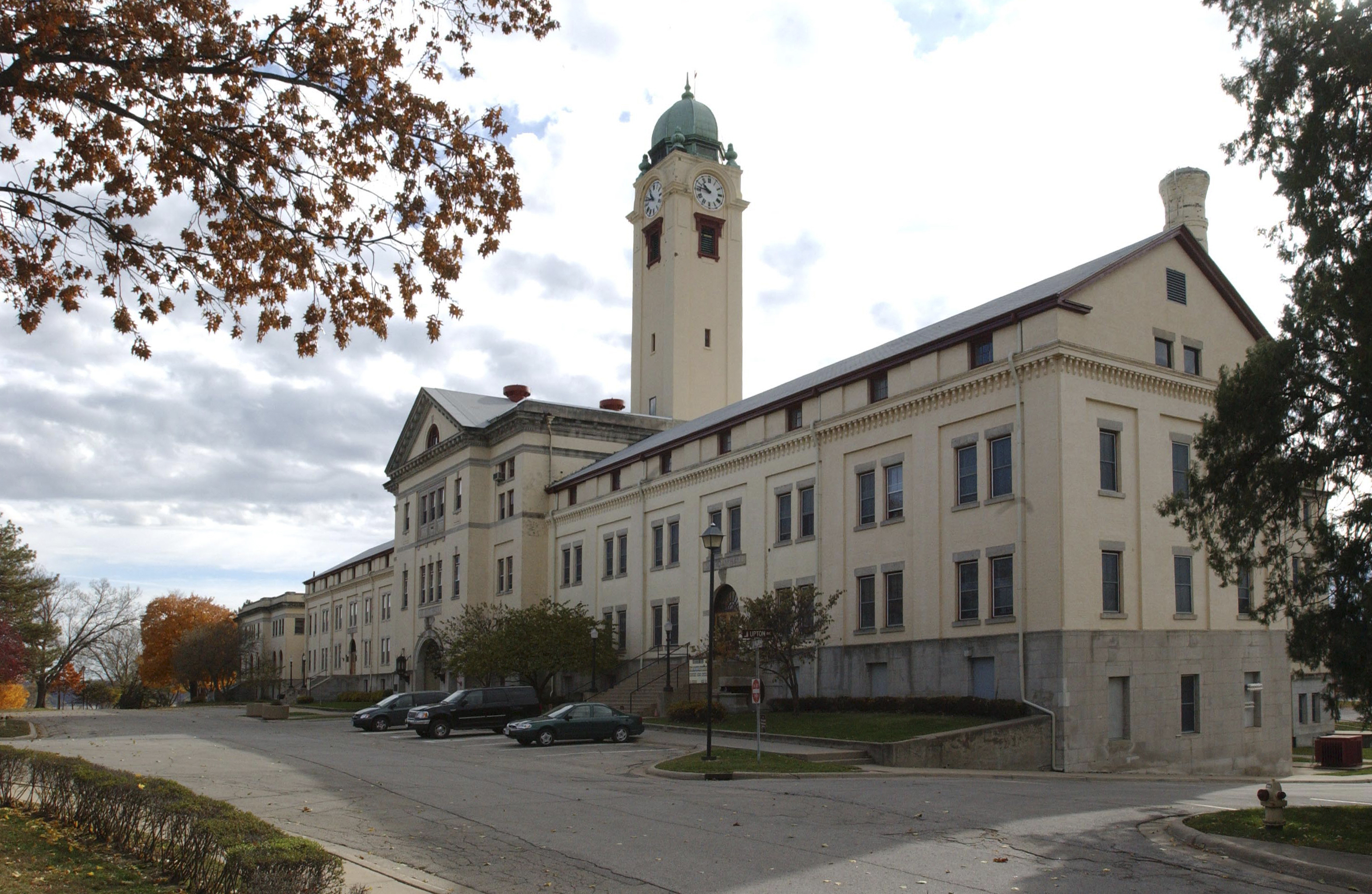
Grant Hall, the headquarters and symbol of Fort Leavenworth

See Kansas forts and posts for a historical list

As a supplement to the list of cities, the following military installations are provided because of their relative size in active duty and/or service members living on the post and their location within the borders of the state of Kansas. The table values for "Population in Quarters" includes reported totals of active duty, family, civilians, reservists, and retired personnel living on the installation.

As of 2016, over 85,000 people live on military installations in Kansas—including over 25,000 active duty personnel. Although not considered "cities", these military installations certainly should be considered as population centers of note.

| Installation | Population in quarters | Active duty personnel | County |
|---|---|---|---|
| Fort Riley | 54,957 | 18,553 | Riley and Geary |
| McConnell Air Force Base | 17,523 | 2,989 | Sedgwick |
| Fort Leavenworth | 12,733 | 5,383 | Leavenworth |

== Fictional cities ==
- Flowers, Kansas, from the book The Van Gogh Cafe, located on Interstate 70.
- Jericho, Kansas, setting of the 2006 TV series Jericho, located approximately where the real cities of Colby and Oakley are located in northwest Kansas.
- Rustwater, Kansas, the setting of the 1992 film Leap of Faith.
- Smallville, Kansas, childhood hometown of fictional character Superman.
- Stubbville, Kansas, the town the "people train" passes through near Wichita in the film Planes, Trains, and Automobiles.
- Nowhere, Kansas, the nearest town to the main farmhouse in the 1999 animated series Courage the Cowardly Dog.
- Rachel, Kansas, the setting of the 1966 film, The Ghost and Mr. Chicken.
- Pork Corners, Kansas, hometown of Sgt. Orville Snorkel of Beetle Bailey comics.

== See also ==
- List of counties in Kansas
- List of townships in Kansas
- List of unincorporated communities in Kansas
- List of census-designated places in Kansas
- List of ghost towns in Kansas
- Lists of places in Kansas
- Kansas locations by per capita income
- Kansas census statistical areas
- Kansas license plate county codes

== Images ==
Notable incorporated cities in Kansas

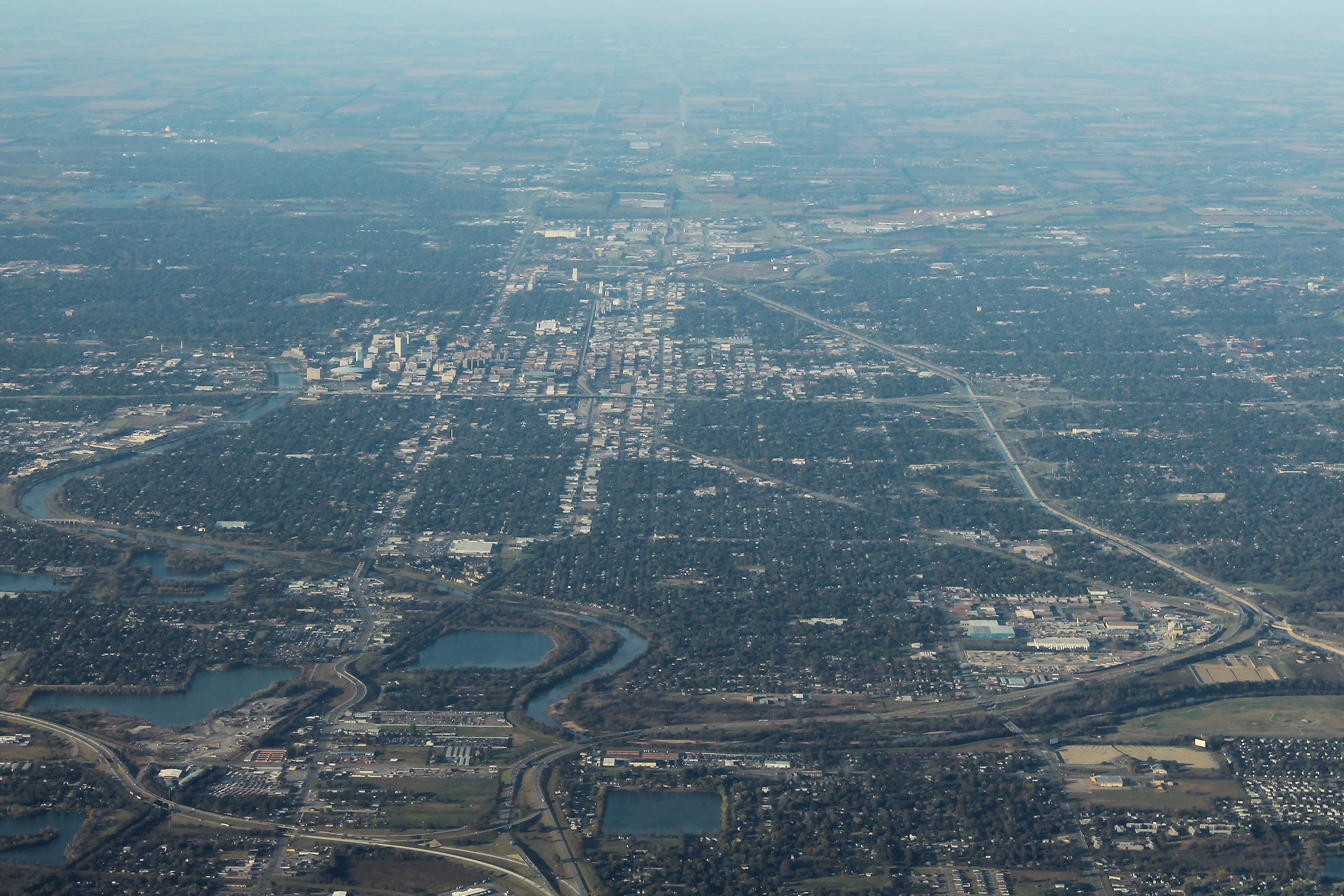
Wichita, most populous city

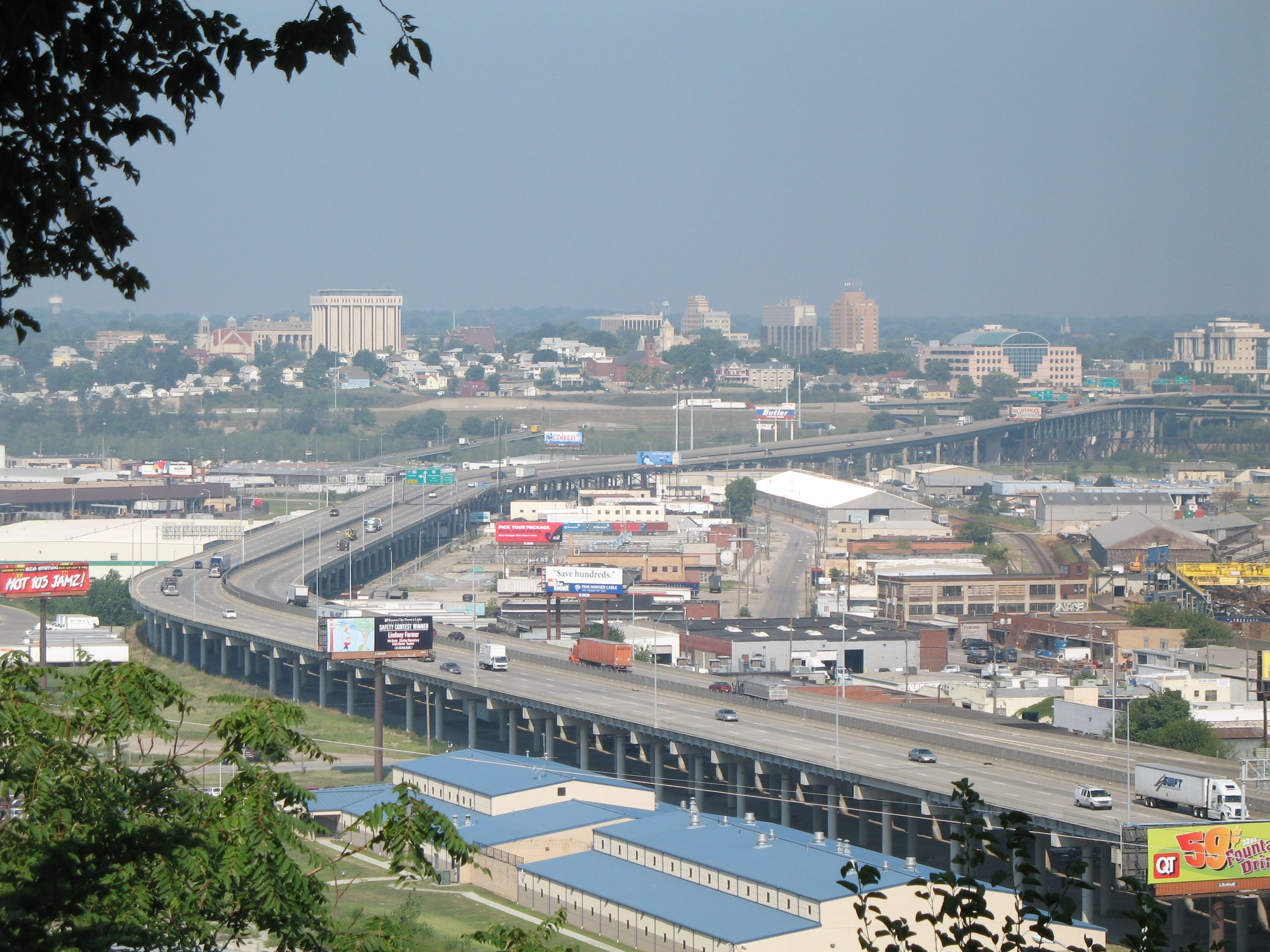
Kansas City, the third-most populous city

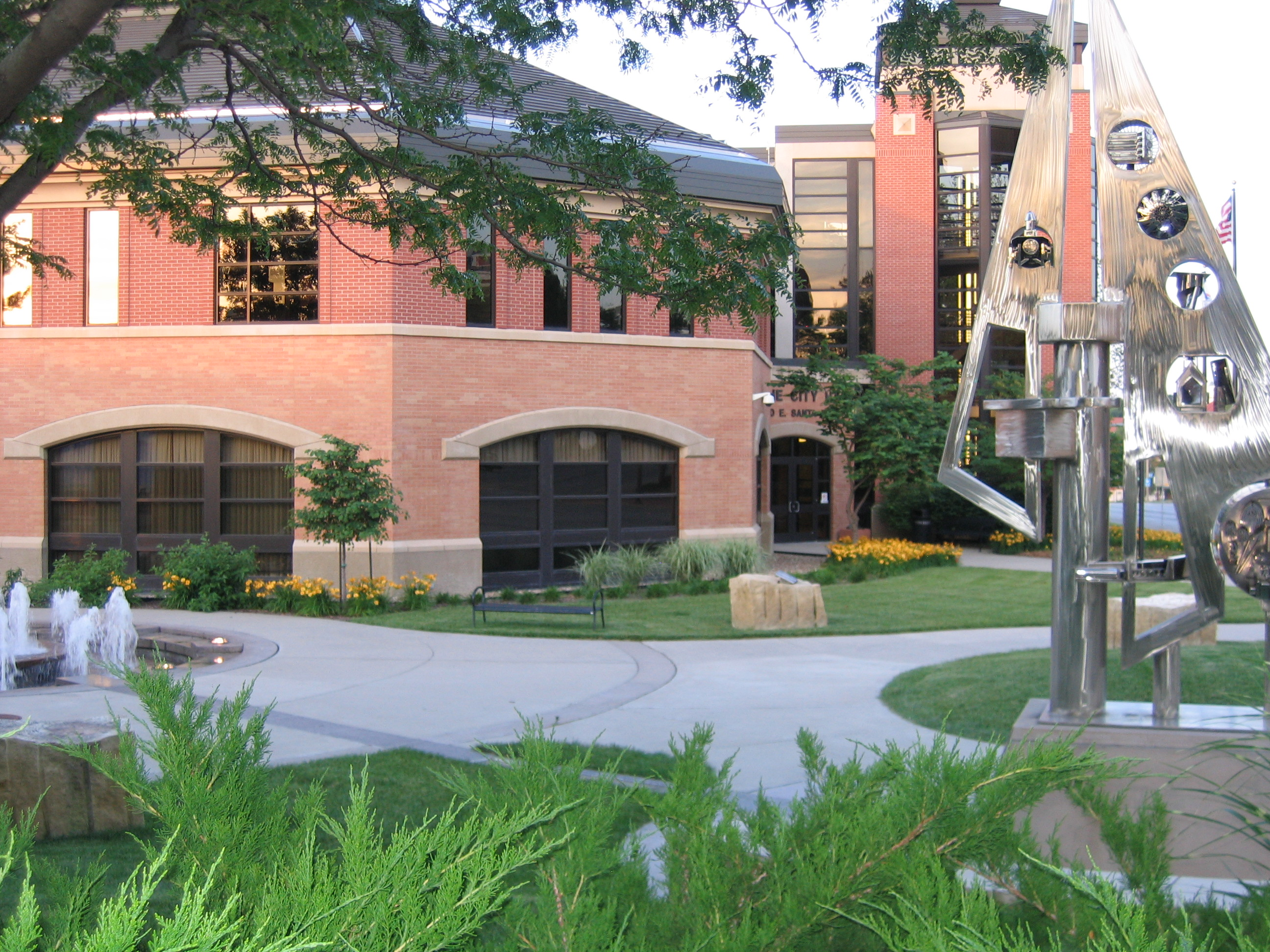
Olathe, the fourth-most populous city

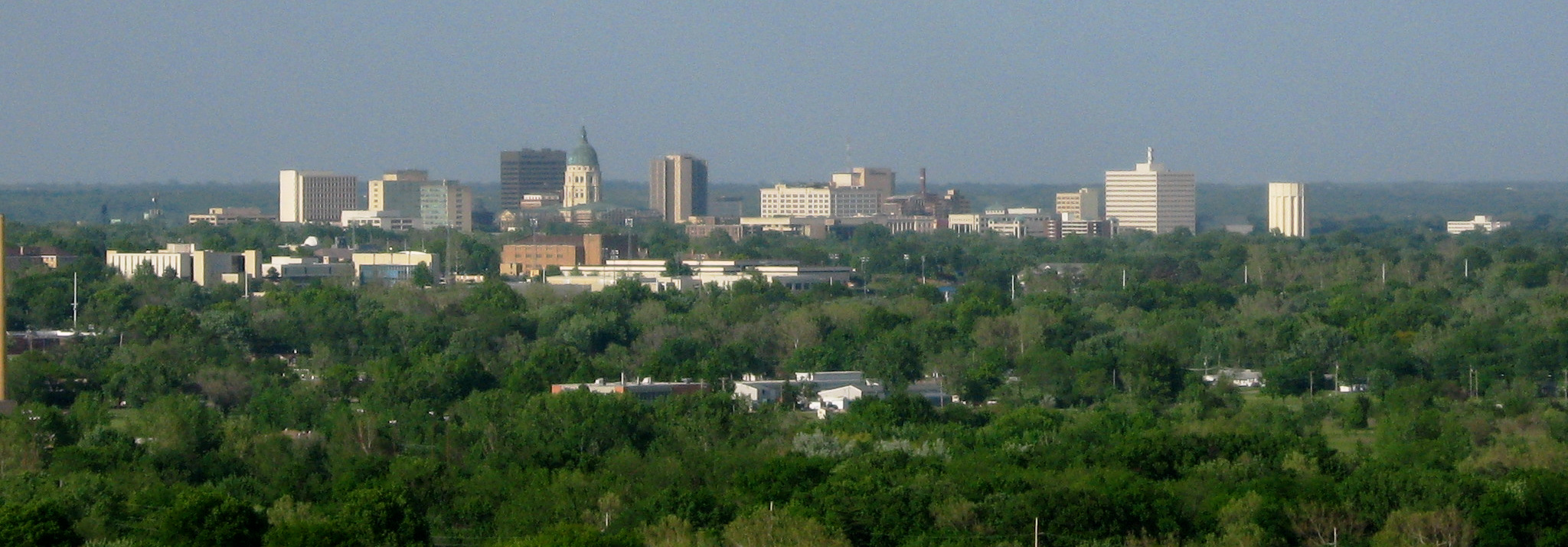
Topeka, the capital of Kansas and the fifth-most populous city
