= Yaggy, Kansas =

Unincorporated community in Reno County, Kansas

- Unincorporated community
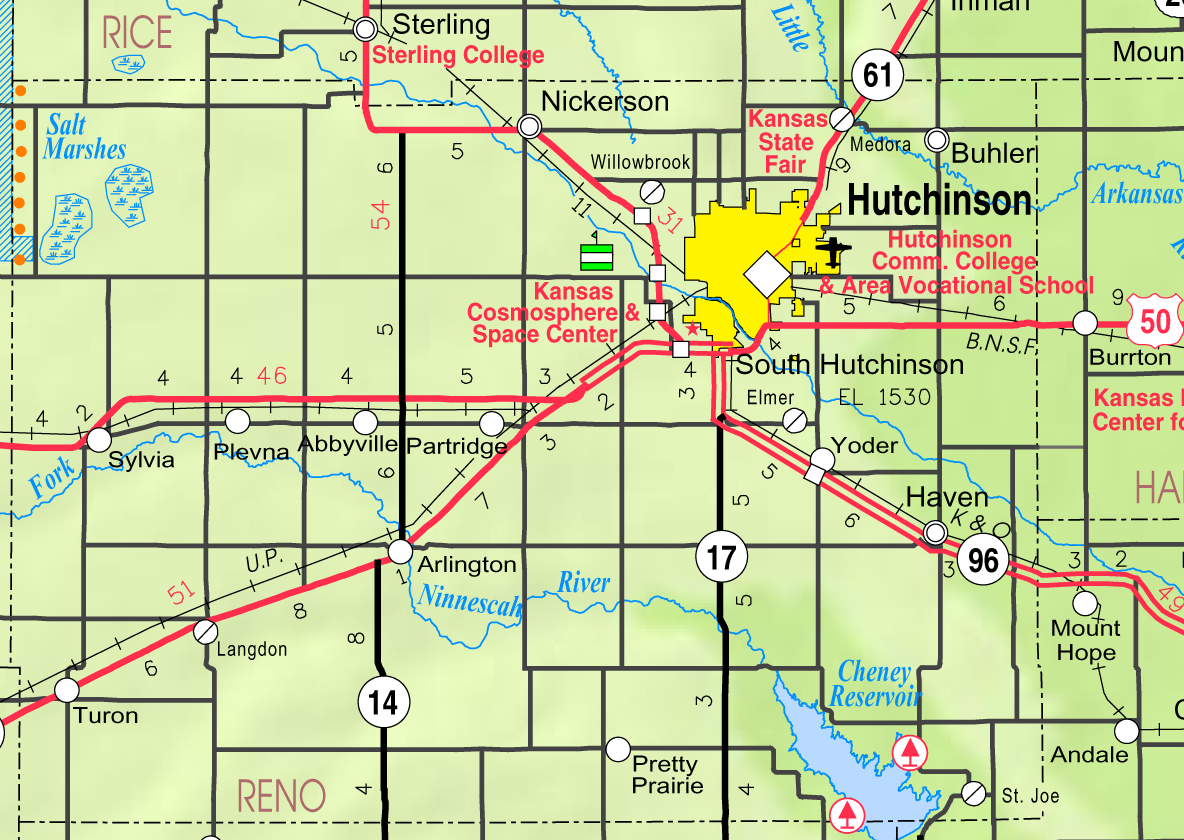
- KDOT map of Reno County (legend)

- Location within Kansas Location within the United States
- Coordinates: 38°05′49″N 98°00′32″W
- Country: United States
- State: Kansas
- County: Reno
- Elevation: 1,562 ft (476 m)
- Time zone: UTC-6 (CST)
  - Summer (DST): UTC-5 (CDT)
- Area code: 620
- FIPS code: 20-80625
- GNIS ID: 484759

Yaggy is an unincorporated community in Reno County, Kansas, United States. It is located northwest of Hutchinson and west of Willowbrook, near a railroad.

== History ==
Yaggy had a short-lived post office ca. 1901.

== Education ==
The community is served by Nickerson–South Hutchinson USD 309 public school district.
