= The Highlands, Kansas =

City in Reno County, Kansas

- City
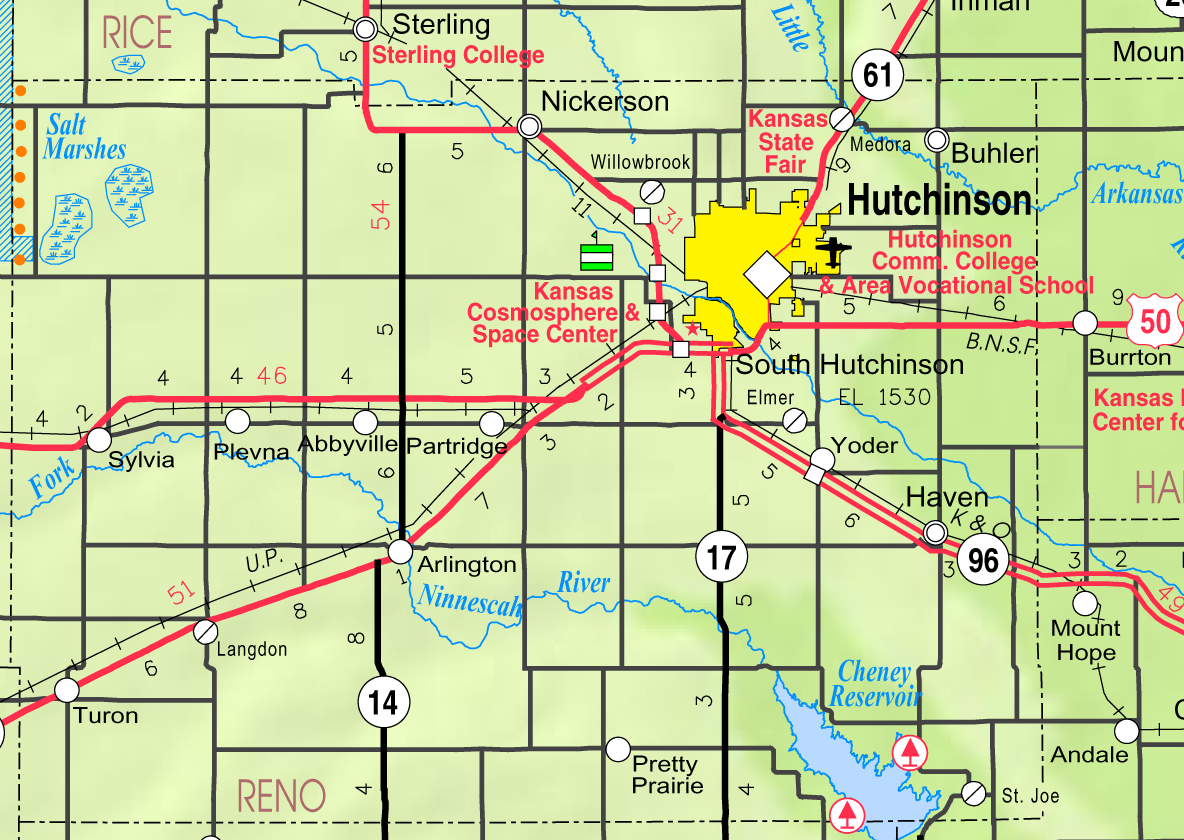
- KDOT map of Reno County (legend)
- Coordinates: 38°09′44″N 97°56′48″W
- Country: United States
- State: Kansas
- County: Reno
- Incorporated: July 25, 2017

Area
  - Total: 1.02 sq mi (2.6 km^{2})
  - Land: 1.02 sq mi (2.6 km^{2})
  - Water: 0.00 sq mi (0 km^{2})
- Elevation: 1,686 ft (514 m)

Population (2020)
  - Total: 349
  - Density: 342/sq mi (132/km^{2})
- Time zone: UTC-6 (CST)
  - Summer (DST): UTC-5 (CDT)
- Area code: 620
- FIPS code: 20-70357
- GNIS ID: 2798081
- Website: thehighlandsgov.net

The Highlands is a city in Reno County, Kansas, United States. As of the 2020 census, the population of the city was 349. It is located north of the city of Hutchinson.

== History ==
The Highlands was incorporated from 21 subdivisions surrounding the Crazy Horse Golf Club in 2017, in order to provide tax dollars for deteriorating roads. The Highlands was the first new city in Reno County to be incorporated in 65 years since the incorporation of Willowbrook.

== Geography ==
According to the United States Census Bureau, the city has a total area of 1.025 square miles (2.65 km^{2}), all land.

== Demographics ==
Historical population
Census	Pop.	Note	%±
2020	349		—
U.S. Decennial Census

== Education ==
The community is served by Nickerson–South Hutchinson USD 309 public school district.

== See also ==
- Highland, Kansas
