= Nickerson–South Hutchinson USD 309 =

Public school district in Hutchinson, Kansas

Address
- 4501 W. 4th Ave. Hutchinson, Kansas, 67501; United States

District information
- Type: Public
- Grades: K to 12
- Schools: 5

Other information
- Website: usd309ks.org

Nickerson–South Hutchinson USD 309 is a unified school district headquartered in South Hutchinson, Kansas, United States. The district includes the communities of Nickerson, South Hutchinson, Willowbrook, Yaggy, The Highlands, and nearby rural areas.

== Schools ==
The school district operates the following schools:

- Nickerson High School
- Reno Valley Middle School
- Nickerson Elementary School
- South Hutchinson Elementary School
- Central State Academy

== See also ==
- List of high schools in Kansas
- List of unified school districts in Kansas
- Kansas State Department of Education
- Kansas State High School Activities Association
