= Willowbrook, Kansas =

City in Reno County, Kansas

- City
- Location within Reno County and Kansas
- Interactive map of Willowbrook, Kansas
- Coordinates: 38°06′04″N 97°59′31″W
- Country: United States
- State: Kansas
- County: Reno
- Founded: 1950s
- Incorporated: 1952

Area
  - Total: 0.30 sq mi (0.78 km^{2})
  - Land: 0.30 sq mi (0.78 km^{2})
  - Water: 0 sq mi (0.00 km^{2})
- Elevation: 1,555 ft (474 m)

Population (2020)
  - Total: 71
  - Density: 240/sq mi (91/km^{2})
- Time zone: UTC-6 (CST)
  - Summer (DST): UTC-5 (CDT)
- Area code: 620
- FIPS code: 20-79425
- GNIS ID: 2397326

Willowbrook is a city in Reno County, Kansas, United States. As of the 2020 census, the population of the city was 71. It is a northwestern suburb of Hutchinson.

== Geography ==
According to the United States Census Bureau, the city has a total area of 0.31 square miles (0.80 km^{2}), all land.

== Demographics ==
Historical population
Census	Pop.	Note	%±
1960	62		—
1970	100		61.3%
1980	109		9.0%
1990	95		−12.8%
2000	36		−62.1%
2010	87		141.7%
2020	71		−18.4%
U.S. Decennial Census

=== 2010 census ===
As of the census of 2010, there were 87 people, 35 households, and 33 families residing in the city. The population density was 280.6 inhabitants per square mile (108.3/km^{2}). There were 35 housing units at an average density of 112.9 per square mile (43.6/km^{2}). The racial makeup of the city was 100.0% White. Hispanic or Latino of any race were 1.1% of the population.

There were 35 households, of which 20.0% had children under the age of 18 living with them, 94.3% were married couples living together, and 5.7% were non-families. 5.7% of all households were made up of individuals, and 5.8% had someone living alone who was 65 years of age or older. The average household size was 2.49 and the average family size was 2.55.

The median age in the city was 54.8 years. 17.2% of residents were under the age of 18; 1% were between the ages of 18 and 24; 18.3% were from 25 to 44; 30.9% were from 45 to 64; and 32.2% were 65 years of age or older. The gender makeup of the city was 49.4% male and 50.6% female.

=== 2000 census ===
As of the census of 2000, there were 36 people, 13 households, and 13 families residing in the city. The population density was 44.8 inhabitants per square mile (17.3/km^{2}). There were 13 housing units at an average density of 41.5 per square mile (16.0/km^{2}). The racial makeup of the city was 100.00% White.

There were 13 households, out of which 30.8% had children under the age of 18 living with them, 100.0% were married couples living together, and 0.0% were non-families. No households were made up of individuals, and none had someone living alone who was 65 years of age or older. The average household size was 2.77 and the average family size was 2.77.

In the city, the population was spread out, with 11.1% under the age of 18, 13.9% from 18 to 24, 5.6% from 25 to 44, 52.8% from 45 to 64, and 16.7% who were 65 years of age or older. The median age was 54 years. For every 100 females, there were 125.0 males. For every 100 females age 18 and over, there were 128.6 males.

The median income for a household in the city was $166,528, and the median income for a family was $166,528. Males had a median income of $100,000 versus $21,250 for females. The per capita income for the city was $118,946. None of the population and none of the families were below the poverty line.

== Education ==
The community is served by Nickerson–South Hutchinson USD 309 public school district.
