= Webster, Kansas =

Unincorporated community in Rooks County, Kansas

- Unincorporated community
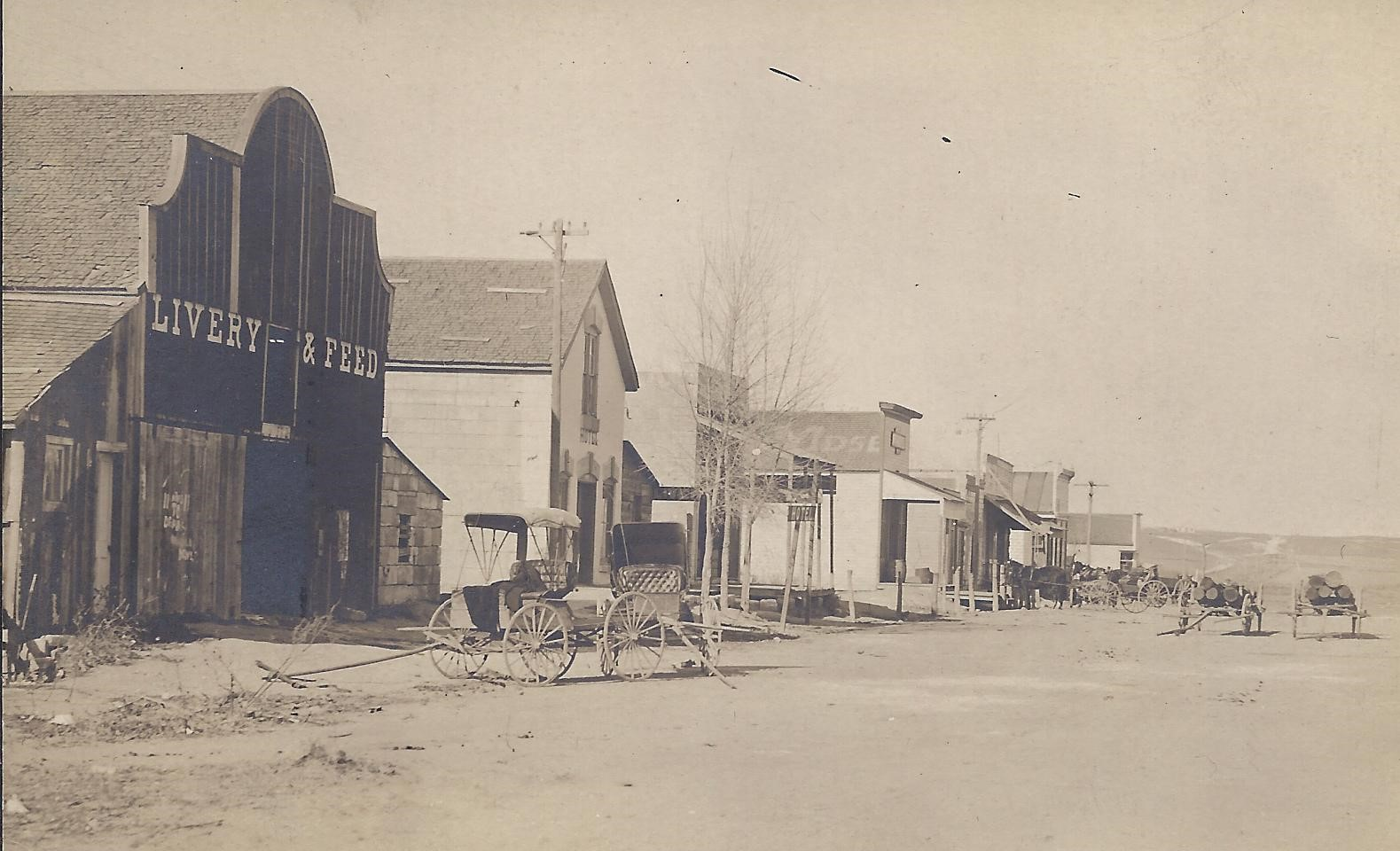
- Webster street scene (est. early 1900s)

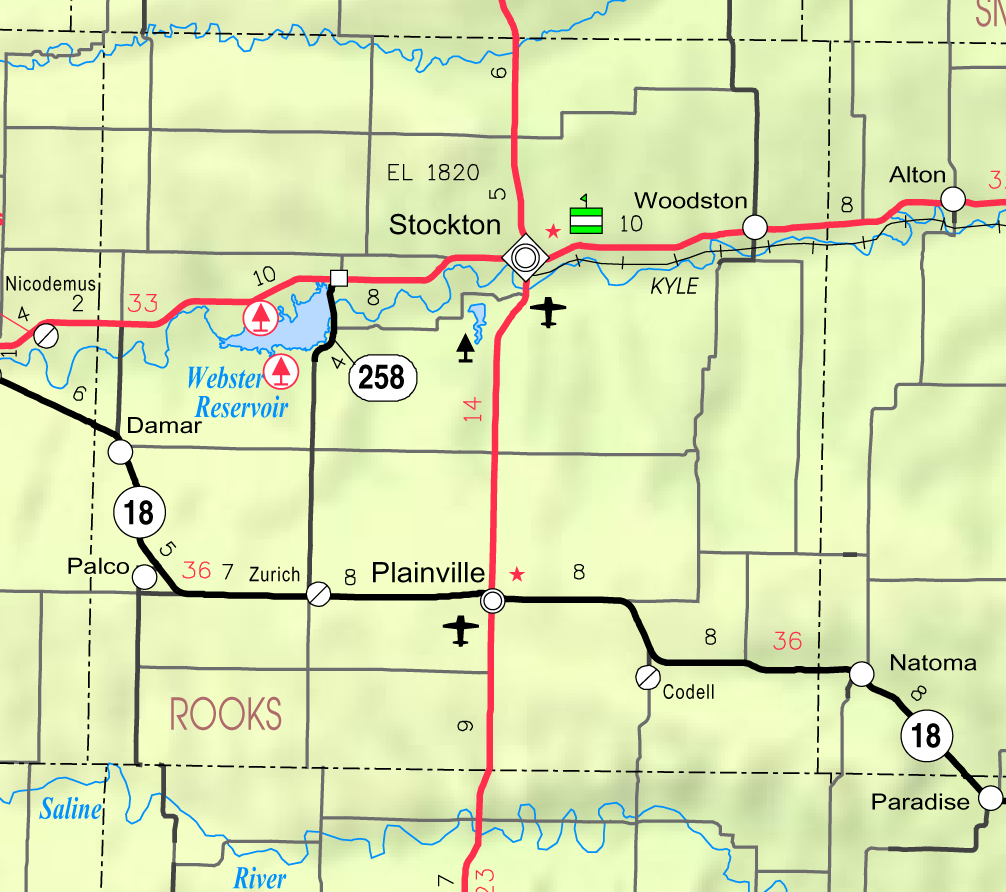
- KDOT map of Rooks County (legend)

- Location within Kansas Location within the United States
- Coordinates: 39°24′06″N 99°26′09″W
- Country: United States
- State: Kansas
- County: Rooks
- Township: Belmont
- Founded: late 1870s
- Platted: 1885
- Named for: Daniel Webster
- Elevation: 1,870 ft (570 m)
- Time zone: UTC-6 (CST)
  - Summer (DST): UTC-5 (CDT)
- ZIP Code: 67669
- Area code: 785
- FIPS code: 20-76265
- GNIS ID: 484592

Webster was an unincorporated community in Belmont Township, Rooks County, Kansas, United States.

== History ==
The community of Webster was established in the Solomon Valley along the South Fork Solomon River in the late 1870s. Webster was created from two settlements; Webster settled on the north side of the river and Belmont that originated on the south side of the river.

Belmont was founded as a trading post in 1876. Due to flooding, the Belmont settlement was moved across the river adjoining the Webster settlement. Belmont was first to file an application for a post office. The Belmont application was denied as another Kansas town had previously been granted the name. Instead, Webster was granted a post office in 1879.

Webster, named for Daniel Webster, was surveyed, platted and filed in 1885. The town was never incorporated.

In 1888, Webster had two doctors, two churches, a school and 24 businesses. A large city park called The Grove featured towering cottonwood trees. The population in 1910 was 200.

Construction of Webster Dam on the South Fork Solomon River was approved in 1953. Webster Reservoir would encompass the area occupied by the town of Webster. As a result, the town was relocated 2 miles to the southeast. Many businesses and residents chose not to relocate to the new town site.

== Geography ==
Webster lies approximately 0.5 miles (0.80 km) south-southeast of Webster Dam in the Smoky Hills region of the Great Plains. Webster is 0.3 miles (0.48 km) east of Kansas Highway 258, 2.5 miles (4.0 km) south of U.S. Route 24, and roughly 8 miles (13 km) west-southwest of Stockton, the county seat.

The original site of Webster was located at 39°24′06″N 99°26′09″W (39.4016756, -99.4359370), a location now submerged beneath Webster Reservoir. The site had an elevation of 1,893 feet (577 m).

== Education ==
Webster High School was closed in 1963. The grade school closed in 1969. The Webster High School mascot was Webster Eagles.

== Transportation ==
Webster lies at the intersection of two unpaved county roads: 11 Road, which runs north-south, and M Terrace, which runs east-west.
