= Township 4, Rooks County, Kansas =

Township in Rooks County, Kansas, U.S.

Township 4
- Township
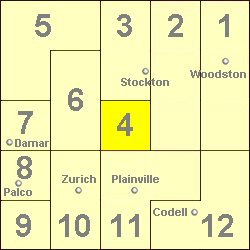
- Location in Rooks County

- Location within state of Kansas
- Coordinates: 39°21′01″N 99°19′30″W
- Country: United States
- State: Kansas
- County: Rooks
- Established: 1879 (as Hobart Township)

Area
  - Total: 35.87 sq mi (92.9 km^{2})
  - Land: 35.825 sq mi (92.79 km^{2})
  - Water: 0.045 sq mi (0.12 km^{2}) 0.13%
- Elevation: 1,890 ft (580 m)

Population (2020)
  - Total: 11
  - Density: 0.31/sq mi (0.12/km^{2})
- Time zone: UTC-6 (CST)
  - Summer (DST): UTC-5 (CDT)
- Area code: 785
- GNIS feature ID: 472225

Township 4 is a township in Rooks County, Kansas, United States. As of the 2020 census, its population was 11.

== History ==
Rooks County was established with four townships: Bow Creek, Lowell, Paradise and Stockton. That number increased to seven by 1878 and twenty three in 1925. The twenty three townships were in place until 1971, when the number was reduced to the current twelve townships.

Township 4 was formed by renaming Hobart Township in 1971. While other Rooks County townships were combined pursuant to Kansas Statute 80-1110, Hobart was just renamed using the new naming standard.

Box Elder Creek flows through Township 4, where it feeds Rooks State Fishing Lake (aka Lake Stockton).

=== Hobart Township ===
Hobart Township was established in 1879 from part of the original Stockton Township. Hobart was named for Hobart, Indiana.

== Geography ==
Township 4 covers an area of 35.87 square miles (92.9 square kilometers).

=== Communities ===
- part of Stockton

=== Adjacent townships ===
Township 3, Rooks County
		north
Township 6, Rooks County	west	self	east	Township 2, Rooks County
Township 10, Rooks County	southwest	south
Township 11, Rooks County

== Transportation ==
Rooks County Regional Airport is located in Township 4.

=== Major highways ===
- US-183
