= Township 7, Rooks County, Kansas =

Township in Rooks County, Kansas, U.S.

Township 7
- Township
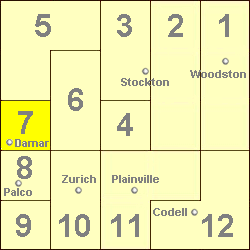
- Location in Rooks County

- Location within state of Kansas
- Coordinates: 39°21′02″N 99°32′54″W
- Country: United States
- State: Kansas
- County: Rooks
- Established: 1880 est. (as Richland Township)

Area
  - Total: 35.513 sq mi (91.98 km^{2})
  - Land: 35.495 sq mi (91.93 km^{2})
  - Water: 0.018 sq mi (0.047 km^{2}) 0.05%
- Elevation: 1,972 ft (601 m)

Population (2020)
  - Total: 154
  - Density: 4.34/sq mi (1.68/km^{2})
- Time zone: UTC-6 (CST)
  - Summer (DST): UTC-5 (CDT)
- Area code: 785
- GNIS feature ID: 472217

Township 7 is a township in Rooks County, Kansas, United States. As of the 2020 census, its population was 154. Damar is the largest population center in Township 7.

== History ==
Rooks County was established with four townships: Bow Creek, Lowell, Paradise and Stockton. That number increased to seven by 1878 and twenty three in 1925. The twenty three townships were in place until 1971 when the number was reduced to the current twelve townships.

Township 7 was formed by renaming Richland Township in 1971. While other Rooks County townships were combined pursuant to Kansas Statute 80-1110, Richland was just renamed using the new naming standard.

=== Richland Township ===
Richland Township was formed in approximately 1880 from part of Stockton Township.

== Geography ==
Township 7 covers an area of 35.513 square miles (91.98 square kilometers). The South Fork Solomon River traverses the township.

=== Communities ===
- Damar

=== Adjacent townships ===
Township 5, Rooks County
Nicodemus Township, Graham County	northwest	north
Wildhorse Township, Graham County	west	self	east	Township 6, Rooks County
Township 8, Rooks County	southwest	south	southeast	Township 10, Rooks County
Township 8, Rooks County

== Transportation ==
=== Major highways ===
- US-24
- K-18
