= Township 8, Rooks County, Kansas =

Township in Rooks County, Kansas, U.S.

Township 8
- Township
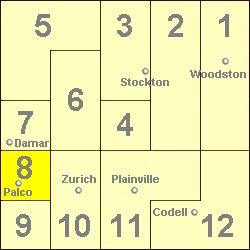
- Location in Rooks County

- Location within state of Kansas
- Coordinates: 39°15′49″N 99°32′58″W
- Country: United States
- State: Kansas
- County: Rooks
- Established: 1879 (as Northampton Township)

Area
  - Total: 36.12 sq mi (93.6 km^{2})
  - Land: 36.088 sq mi (93.47 km^{2})
  - Water: 0.032 sq mi (0.083 km^{2}) 0.09%
- Elevation: 2,205 ft (672 m)

Population (2020)
  - Total: 265
  - Density: 7.34/sq mi (2.84/km^{2})
- Time zone: UTC-6 (CST)
  - Summer (DST): UTC-5 (CDT)
- Area code: 785
- GNIS feature ID: 485294

Township 8 is a township in Rooks County, Kansas, United States. As of the 2020 census, its population was 265. Palco is the largest population center in Township 8.

== History ==
Rooks County was established with four townships: Bow Creek, Lowell, Paradise and Stockton. That number increased to seven by 1878 and twenty three in 1925. The twenty three townships were in place until 1971 when the number was reduced to the current twelve townships.

Township 8 was formed by renaming Northampton Township in 1971. While other Rooks County townships were combined pursuant to Kansas Statute 80-1110, Northampton was just renamed using the new naming standard.

=== Northampton Township ===
Northampton Township was established in 1879 from part of Plainville Township. Plainville Township was composed of territory from the original Paradise Township.

== Geography ==
Township 8 covers an area of 36.12 square miles (93.6 square kilometers).

=== Communities ===
- Palco

=== Adjacent townships ===
Township 7, Rooks County
Wildhorse Township, Graham County	northwest	north	northeast	Township 6, Rooks County
Morlan Township, Graham County	west	self	east	Township 10, Rooks County
		south
Township 9, Rooks County

== Transportation ==
=== Major highways ===
- K-18
