= Adamson, Kansas =

- Ghost town
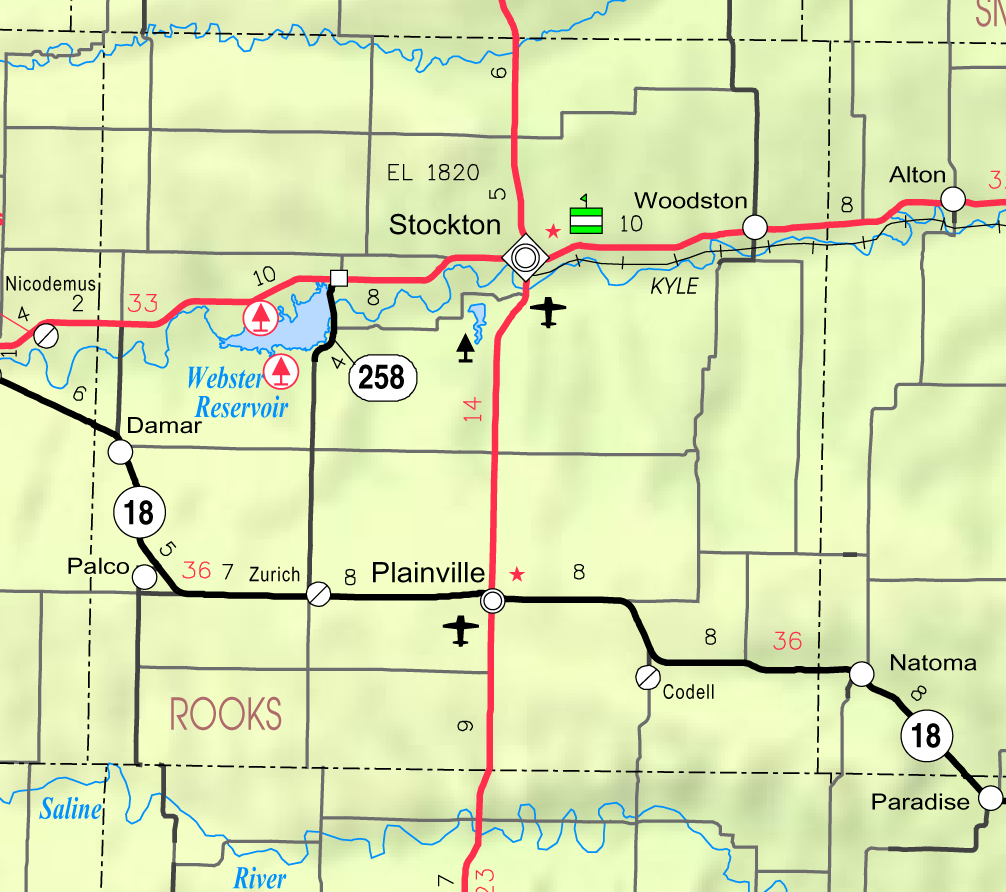
- KDOT map of Rooks County (legend)

- Location within Kansas Location within the United States
- Coordinates: 39°33′05″N 99°35′06″W
- Country: United States
- State: Kansas
- County: Rooks
- Elevation: 2,133 ft (650 m)

Population
  - Total: 0
- Time zone: UTC-6 (CST)
  - Summer (DST): UTC-5 (CDT)
- Area code: 785
- GNIS ID: 482521

Adamson is a ghost town in Bow Creek Township, Rooks County, Kansas, United States.

== History ==
Adamson was issued a post office in 1875. The post office was discontinued in 1892. There is nothing left of Adamson.
