= Sugarloaf, Kansas =

- Ghost town
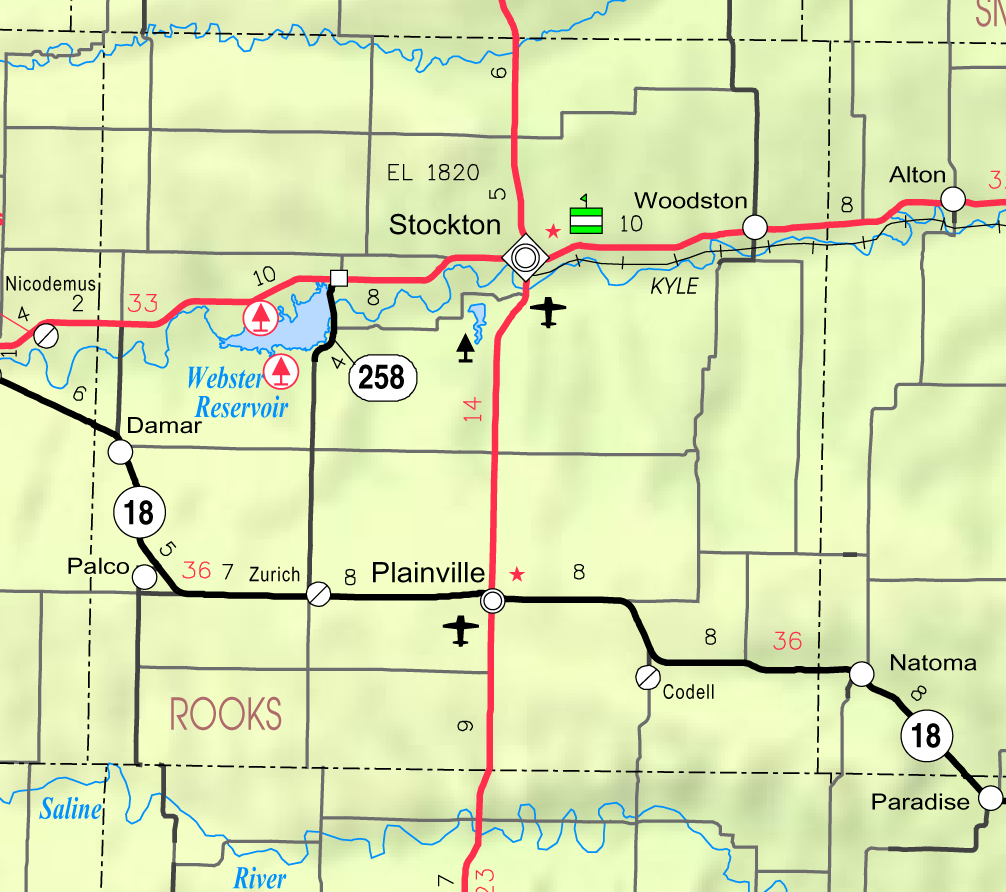
- KDOT map of Rooks County (legend)

- Location within Kansas Location within the United States
- Coordinates: 39°32′10″N 99°23′47″W
- Country: United States
- State: Kansas
- County: Rooks
- Elevation: 2,077 ft (633 m)

Population
  - Total: 0
- Time zone: UTC-6 (CST)
  - Summer (DST): UTC-5 (CDT)
- Area code: 785
- GNIS ID: 482523

Sugarloaf is a ghost town in Sugar Loaf Township, Rooks County, Kansas, United States.

== History ==
Sugar Loaf (aka Sugarloaf) was issued a post office in 1878. The post office was renamed Sugarloaf in 1895. The Sugarloaf post office was discontinued in 1904. The population in 1910 was 15.
