= Nyra, Kansas =

- Ghost town
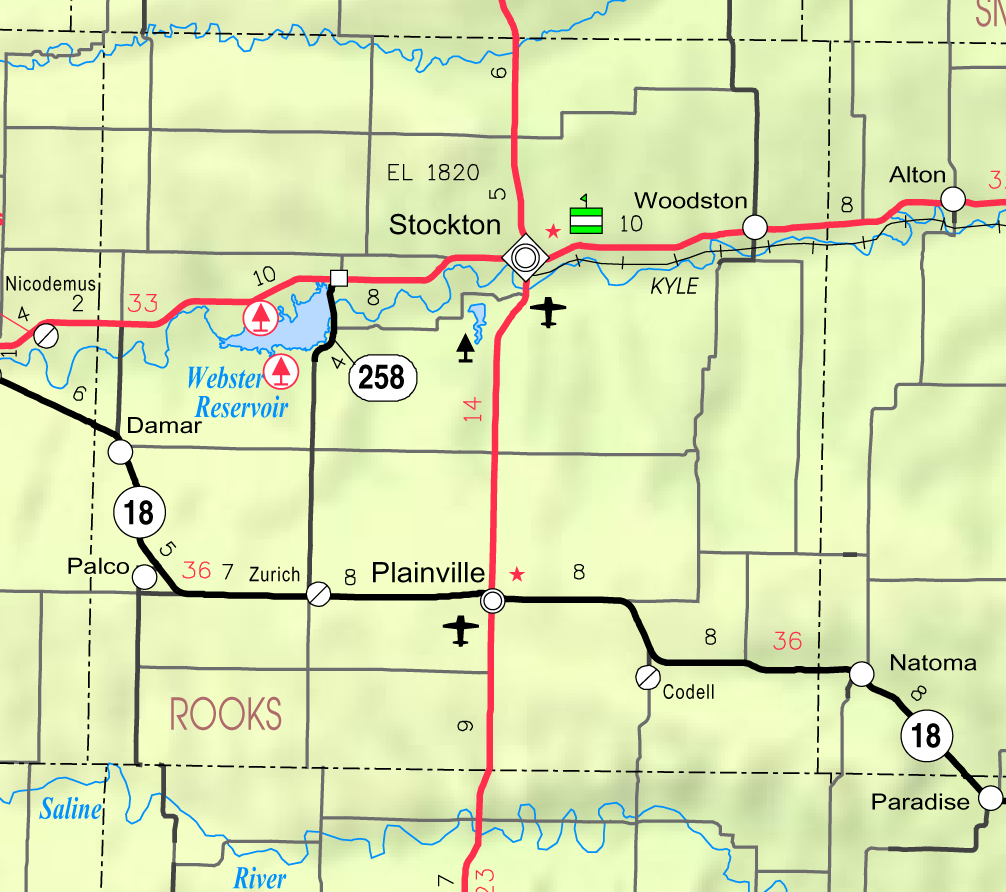
- KDOT map of Rooks County (legend)

- Location within Kansas Location within the United States
- Coordinates: 39°16′43″N 99°13′51″W
- Country: United States
- State: Kansas
- County: Rooks
- Elevation: 2,054 ft (626 m)

Population
  - Total: 0
- Time zone: UTC-6 (CST)
  - Summer (DST): UTC-5 (CDT)
- Area code: 785
- GNIS ID: 482532

Nyra is a ghost town in Twin Mound Township, Rooks County, Kansas, United States.

== History ==
Nyra was issued a post office in 1883. The post office was discontinued in 1888. There is nothing left of Nyra.
