= Slate, Kansas =

- Ghost town
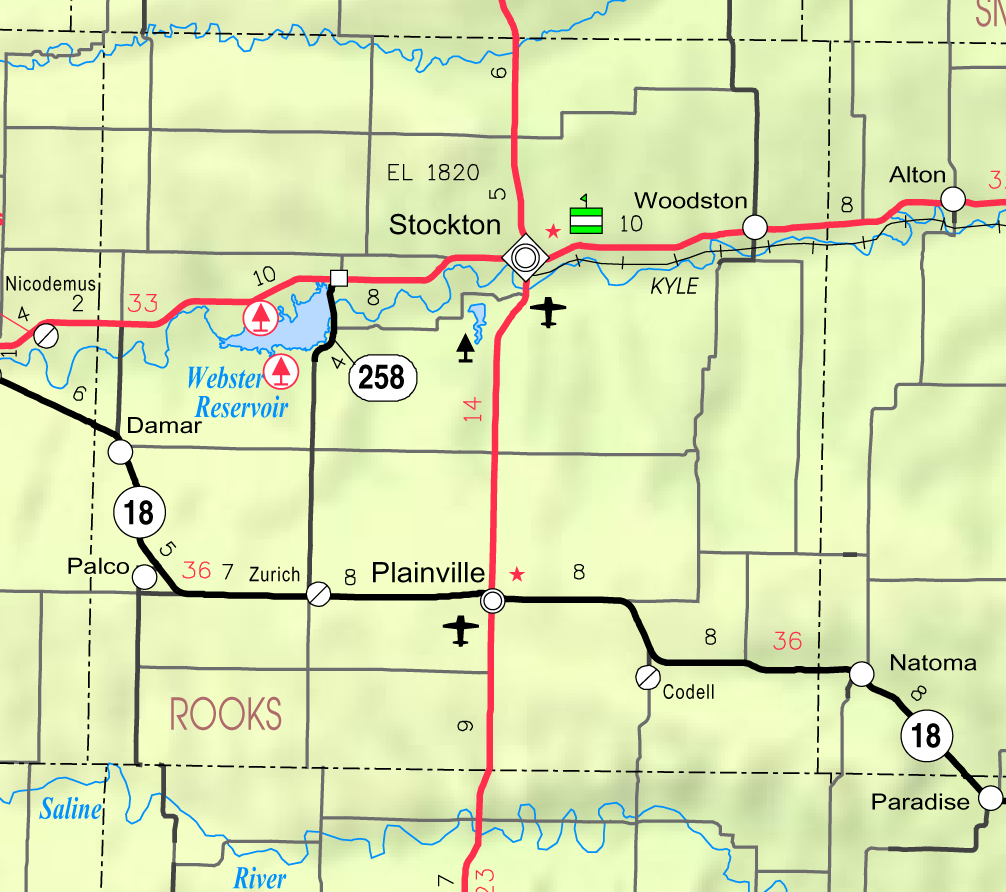
- KDOT map of Rooks County (legend)

- Location within Kansas Location within the United States
- Coordinates: 39°28′50″N 99°31′38″W
- Country: United States
- State: Kansas
- County: Rooks
- Elevation: 2,172 ft (662 m)

Population
  - Total: 0
- Time zone: UTC-6 (CST)
  - Summer (DST): UTC-5 (CDT)
- Area code: 785
- GNIS ID: 482003

Slate is a ghost town in Bow Creek Township, Rooks County, Kansas, United States.

== History ==
Slate was located in Bow Township along Slate Creek. A post office was issued to Slate in 1880. The post office was discontinued in 1903. The population of Slate was 36 as of 1910.
