= Township 6, Rooks County, Kansas =

Township in Rooks County, Kansas, U.S.

Township 6
- Township
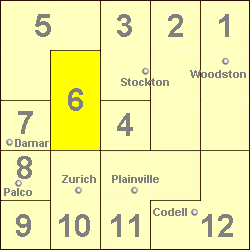
- Location in Rooks County

- Location within state of Kansas
- Coordinates: 39°23′39″N 99°26′10″W
- Country: United States
- State: Kansas
- County: Rooks
- Established: 1971

Area
  - Total: 71.938 sq mi (186.32 km^{2})
  - Land: 68.839 sq mi (178.29 km^{2})
  - Water: 3.099 sq mi (8.03 km^{2}) 4.31%
- Elevation: 1,893 ft (577 m)

Population (2020)
  - Total: 86
  - Density: 1.2/sq mi (0.48/km^{2})
- Time zone: UTC-6 (CST)
  - Summer (DST): UTC-5 (CDT)
- Area code: 785
- GNIS feature ID: 472224

Township 6 is a township in Rooks County, Kansas, United States. As of the 2020 census, its population was 86.

== History ==
Rooks County was established with four townships: Bow Creek, Lowell, Paradise and Stockton. That number increased to seven by 1878 and twenty three in 1925. The twenty three townships were in place until 1971 when the number was reduced to the current twelve townships.

Township 6 was formed from Rooks County townships Belmont and Rush in 1971, pursuant to Kansas Statute 80-1110. 80-1110 allowed for the dissolution of townships and assigning those territories to contiguous townships.

Ash Creek and Sand Creek flow through the northern part of Township 6. Lost Creek flows through the southern part of Township 6 to South Fork Solomon River.

=== Belmont Township ===
Belmont Township was established around 1878 from part of Stockton Township. The South Fork Solomon River traversed the township where a dam was built to form Webster Reservoir.

=== Rush Township ===
Rush Township was established in 1880 from part of Stockton Township.

== Geography ==
Township 6 covers an area of 71.938 square miles (186.32 square kilometers).

=== Parks and Recreation ===
Webster State Park and most of Webster Reservoir are located in Township 6.

=== Adjacent townships ===
Township 5, Rooks County	northwest		northeast	Township 3, Rooks County
Township 7, Rooks County	west	self	east	Township 4, Rooks County
Township 8, Rooks County	southwest	south	southeast	Township 11, Rooks County
Township 10, Rooks County

== Transportation ==
=== Major highways ===
- US-24
