= Laton =

Laton may mean:

- Laton, California, a census designated place in California
- Laton, Kansas, a ghost town in Kansas
- Latopolis, an ancient city of Egypt
- Laton (record label), an experimental electronic music label based in Austria, run by Franz Pomassl
