= Gould City, Kansas =

- Ghost town
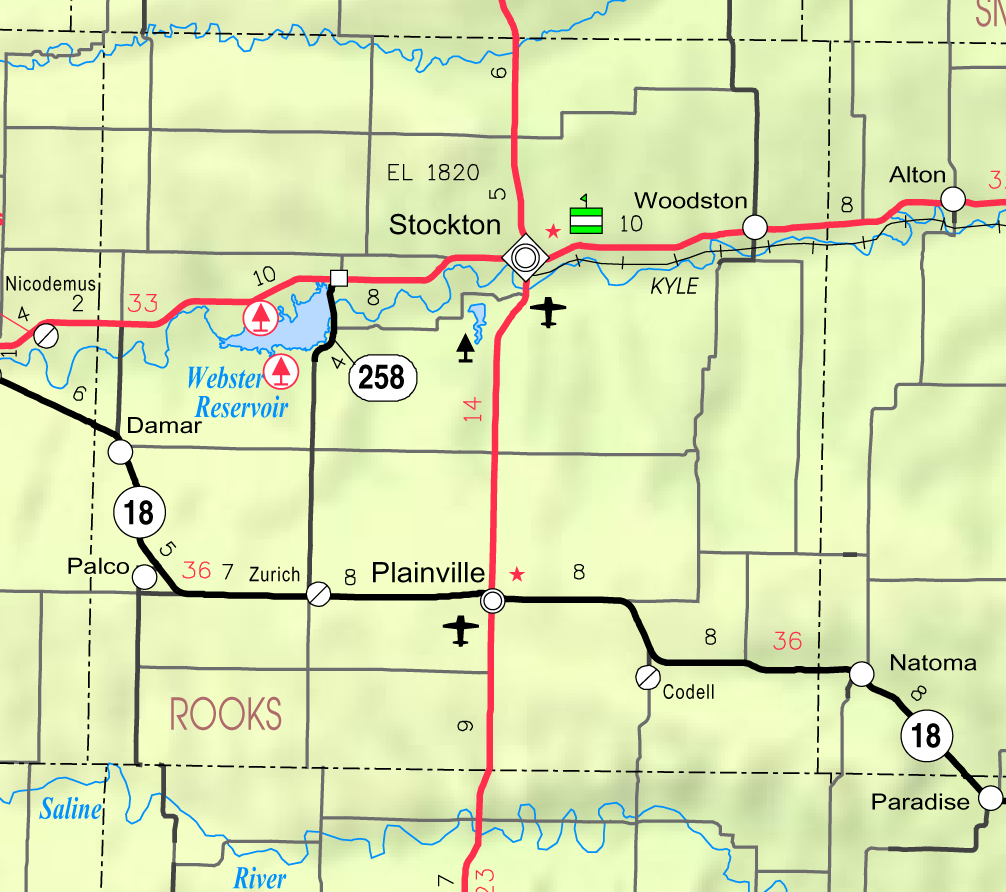
- KDOT map of Rooks County (legend)

- Location within Kansas Location within the United States
- Coordinates: 39°23′00″N 99°35′01″W
- Country: United States
- State: Kansas
- County: Rooks
- Elevation: 1,952 ft (595 m)

Population
  - Total: 0
- Time zone: UTC-6 (CST)
  - Summer (DST): UTC-5 (CDT)
- Area code: 785
- GNIS ID: 482528

Gould City is a ghost town in Alcona Township, Rooks County, Kansas, United States.
