= Webster Reservoir =

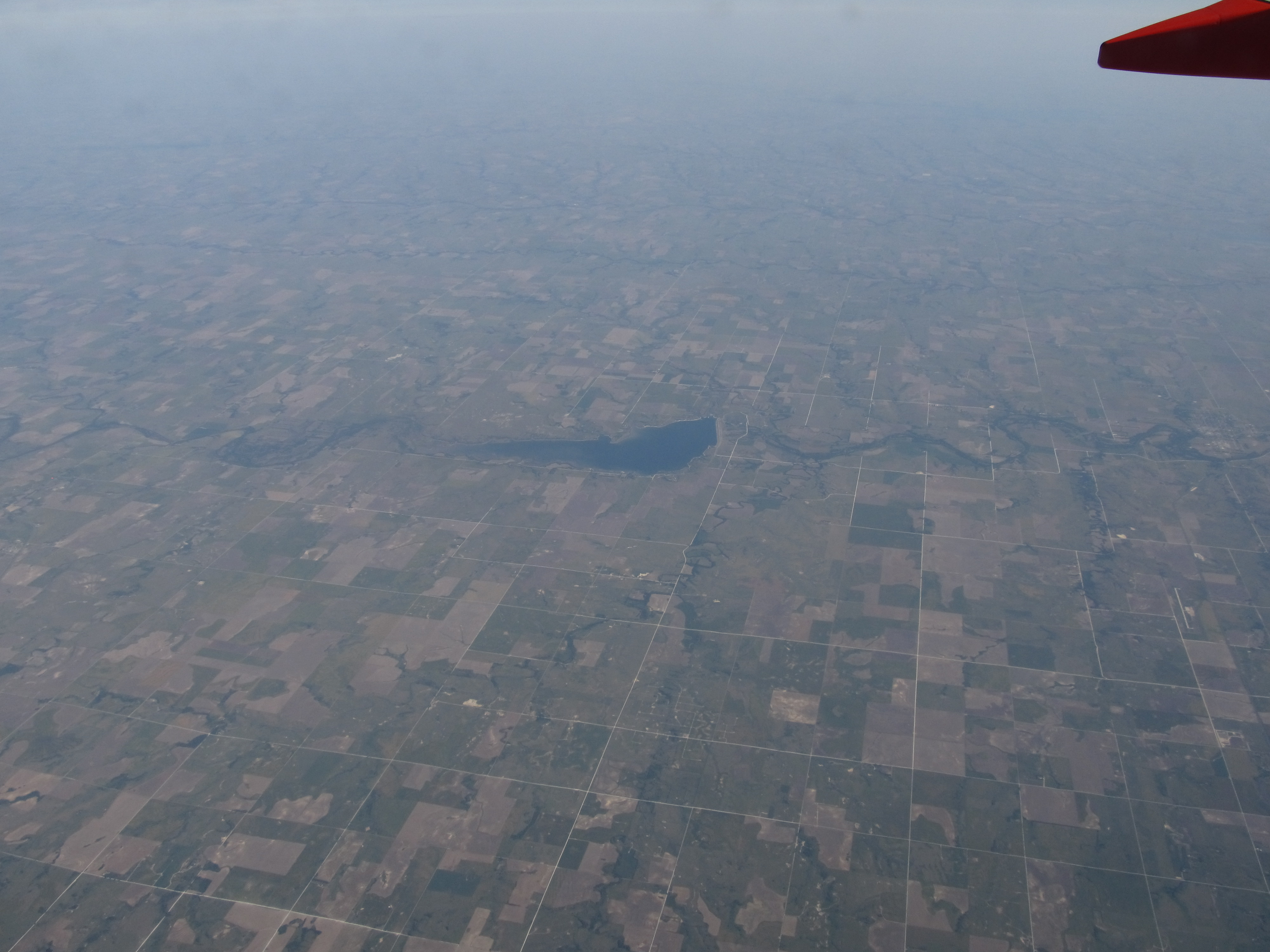
- Aerial view of Webster Reservoir

- Location within Kansas Location within the United States

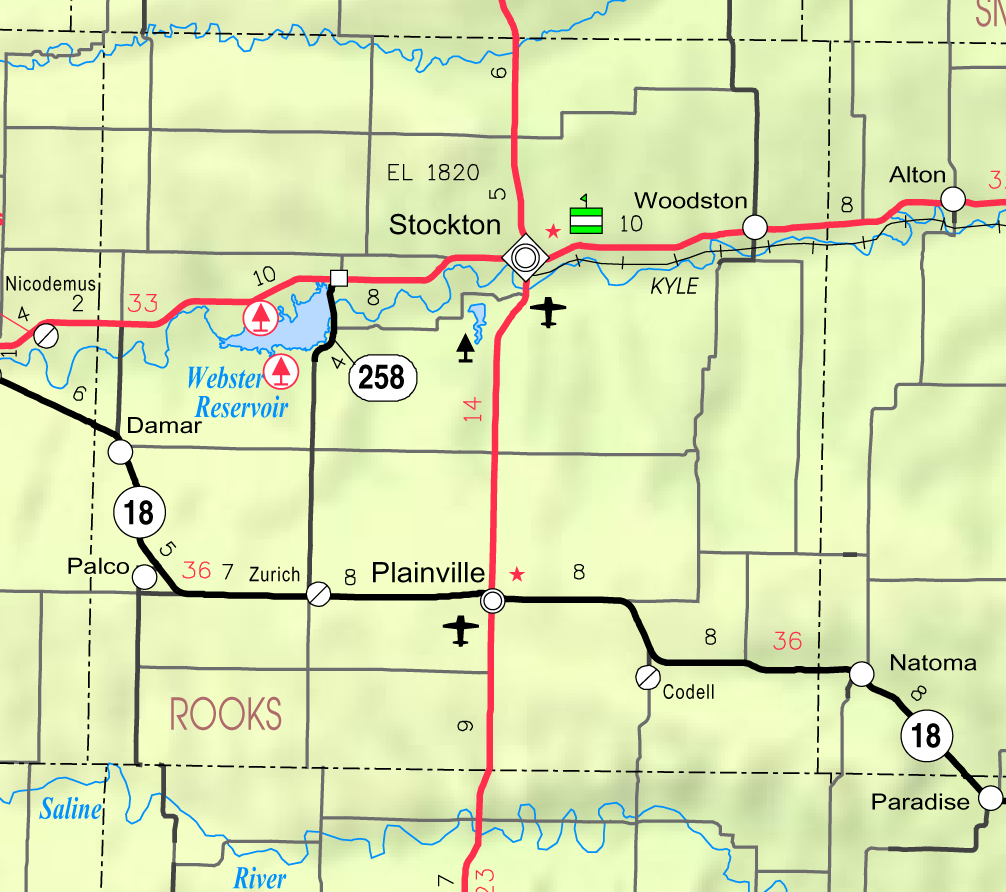
- KDOT map of Rooks County (legend)
- Location: Rooks County, Kansas
- Coordinates: 39°24′30″N 99°25′28″W
- Type: Reservoir
- Primary inflows: South Fork Solomon River
- Primary outflows: South Fork Solomon River
- Catchment area: 1,150 sq mi (3,000 km^{2})
- Basin countries: United States
- Managing agency: U.S. Bureau of Reclamation
- Built: March 1953
- First flooded: May 3, 1956
- Max. length: 7 miles (11 km)
- Surface area: 3,767 acres (15.24 km^{2})
- Max. depth: 42 feet (13 m)
- Water volume: Full: 76,157 acre⋅ft (93,938,000 m^{3}); Current (Nov. 2015): 17,091 acre⋅ft (21,081,000 m^{3})
- Shore length^{1}: 27 miles (43 km)
- Surface elevation: Full: 1,893 ft (577 m); Current (Nov. 2015): 1,870 ft (570 m)
- Settlements: Stockton, Damar, Webster
- ^{1} Shore length is not a well-defined measure.

Webster Reservoir is a reservoir in Rooks County, Kansas, United States. Built and managed by the U.S. Bureau of Reclamation, it is used for flood control, irrigation, and recreation. Webster State Park is located on its shore.

== History ==
Construction of Webster Dam and Reservoir was approved as part of the Pick-Sloan Missouri Basin Program. Following the Great Flood of 1951, the U.S. Bureau of Reclamation determined the project could provide additional flood control and irrigation support to the region. Contractors started construction in March 1953, but a combination of funding problems and adverse weather caused multiple delays over the following years. The project's namesake, the small community of Webster, laid within the reservoir's intended basin and had to be relocated roughly 2 miles (3.2 km) to the southeast. Water storage in the reservoir began May 3, 1956, and the Webster project became formally operational September 1, 1956.

Area residents successfully organized Webster Irrigation District No. 4 and obtained a water right in December 1956. Construction of downstream irrigation infrastructure, including a diversion dam near Woodston, Kansas and the Osborne Canal, began in July 1957 and finished in April 1961.

== Geography ==
Webster Reservoir is located in northwestern Kansas on the western edge of the Smoky Hills region of the Great Plains. It is located entirely within Rooks County.

The reservoir is impounded at its eastern end by Webster Dam located at 39°24′30″N 99°25′28″W (39.4083423, -99.4245476) at an elevation of 1,893 feet (577 m). The South Fork Solomon River is both the reservoir's primary inflow and outflow.

U.S. Route 24 runs generally east-west north of the reservoir. Kansas Highway 258 runs generally north-south along the top of Webster Dam.

There is one unincorporated settlement at Webster Reservoir: Webster, Kansas, the reservoir's namesake, located just southeast of the dam.

== Hydrography ==
The surface area, surface elevation, and water volume of the reservoir fluctuate based on inflow and local climatic conditions. In terms of capacity, the Bureau of Reclamation vertically divides the reservoir into a set of pools based on volume and water level, and it considers the reservoir full when filled to the capacity of its active conservation pool. When full, Webster Reservoir has a surface area of 3,767 acres (15.24 km^{2}), a surface elevation of 1,893 feet (577 m), and a volume of 76,157 acre-feet (93,938,000 m^{3}). When filled to maximum capacity, it has a surface area of 11,270 acres (45.6 km^{2}), a surface elevation of 1,938 feet (591 m), and a volume of 400,422 acre-feet (493,913,000 m^{3}).

== Infrastructure ==
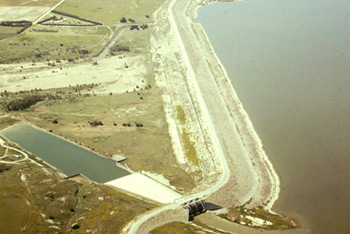
Webster Dam

Webster Dam is an earth-fill embankment dam with a structural height of 154 feet (47 m) and a length of 10,604 feet (3,232 m). At its crest, the dam has an elevation of 1,944 feet (593 m).

== Management ==
The U.S. Bureau of Reclamation operates and maintains Webster Dam and Reservoir. The Kansas Department of Wildlife, Parks and Tourism (KDWP) manages 8,018 acres (32.45 km^{2}) of land around the reservoir and upstream along the South Fork Solomon River as the Webster Wildlife Area.

== Parks and recreation ==
The KDWP manages Webster State Park located on the shore of the reservoir. Occupying a total of 880 acres (3.6 km^{2}), the park is divided into two areas: the Oldtown Area on the north shore and the Goose Flat Area on the south shore. Both areas include boat ramps and camping facilities. The Oldtown Area also includes an amphitheater, swimming beaches, playgrounds, and a hiking trail.

Webster Reservoir is open for sport fishing. Hunting is permitted on the public land around the reservoir although it is restricted in the Wildlife Area.

== Wildlife ==
Fish species resident in Webster Reservoir include bluegill, channel and flathead catfish, crappie, largemouth and smallmouth bass, rainbow trout, walleye, white bass, and wiper. Game animals living around the reservoir include deer, ducks, geese, pheasants, quail, and wild turkeys. Bald eagles are also present in the area.

== See also ==
- List of Kansas state parks
- List of lakes, reservoirs, and dams in Kansas
- List of rivers of Kansas
