= Igo, Kansas =

- Ghost town
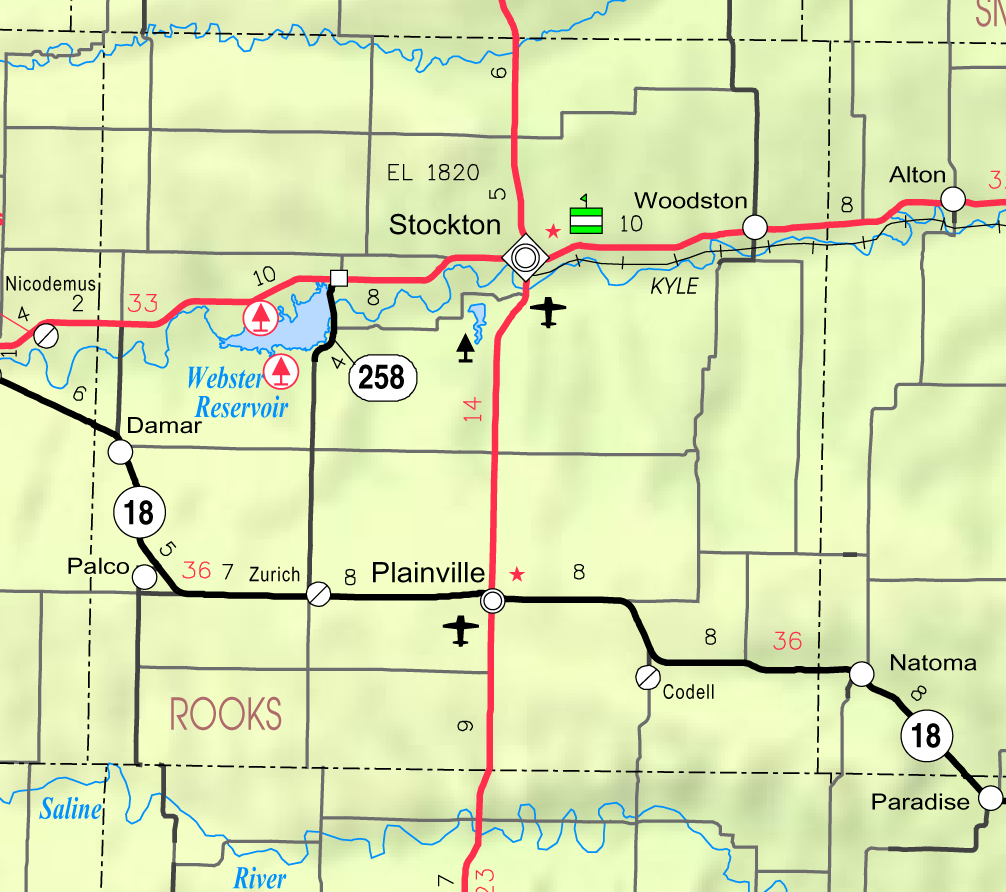
- KDOT map of Rooks County (legend)

- Location within Kansas Location within the United States
- Coordinates: 39°19′20″N 99°08′56″W
- Country: United States
- State: Kansas
- County: Rooks
- Elevation: 1,880 ft (570 m)

Population
  - Total: 0
- Time zone: UTC-6 (CST)
  - Summer (DST): UTC-5 (CDT)
- Area code: 785
- GNIS ID: 481907

Igo is a ghost town in Medicine Township, Rooks County, Kansas, United States.

== History ==
Igo was located in Medicine Township along Big Medicine Creek. A post office was issued to Igo in 1877. The post office was discontinued in 1904. There is nothing left of Igo.
