= Roy M. Fisher =

American journalist

- Born: September 5, 1918
- Died: March 25, 1999
- Education: Kansas State University (BS)
- Occupation: Journalist

Roy M. Fisher (September 5, 1918 – March 25, 1999) was a journalist and Editor-in-Chief of the Chicago Daily News.

Fisher was born in Stockton, Kansas. He received a Bachelor of Science degree in journalism from Kansas State University in 1940. During World War II, he served in the U.S. Pacific Fleet, 1942–1944, was Senior U.S. Naval Liaison Officer, British Pacific Fleet, in 1945, and retired from the U.S. Naval Reserves as a Lieutenant Commander. Fisher began his journalism career in 1945, as a reporter for the Chicago Daily News. He went on to become a feature writer, city editor, and assistant managing editor. In 1951, he was also named a Nieman Fellow at Harvard University in political science and history.

In 1959, Fisher left the Daily News to become the Editorial Director and Vice-President of Field Enterprises Educational Corporation, the publishers of the World Book Encyclopedia and Science Year. Fisher returned to the Chicago Daily News in 1965, as Editor-in-Chief. During his career with the Daily News, Fisher received two Pulitzer Prize nominations and, in 1957, he shared in a Pulitzer Prize Award. As a member of the American Society of Newspaper Editors, he also helped create the Freedom of Information Act in 1966 to provide citizens with more access to governmental documents.

In 1971, Fisher left the Daily News and was appointed Dean of the University of Missouri's School of Journalism and remained in that position until 1982. Under his leadership, in 1981, the Associated Press Managing Editors Association rated Missouri the top journalism school in the country. From 1982 to 1989, Fisher led the Missouri School of Journalism's Washington Program.
