= Webster State Park =

State park in Kansas, United States

- Location within Kansas Location within the United States
- Interactive map of Webster State Park
- Location: Rooks County, Kansas, United States
- Coordinates: 39°24′35″N 99°26′58″W
- Area: 880 acres (360 ha)
- Elevation: 1,893 ft (577 m)
- Established: 1965
- Administrator: Kansas Department of Wildlife and Parks
- Visitors: 143,400 (in 2022)
- Website: Official website
- Kansas State Parks

Webster State Park is a state park of Kansas, United States. It is located west of the city of Stockton in Rooks County. The park offers camping as well as boating on Webster Reservoir.

== See also ==
- List of lakes, reservoirs, and dams in Kansas
- List of rivers of Kansas
