= Survey, Kansas =

- Ghost town
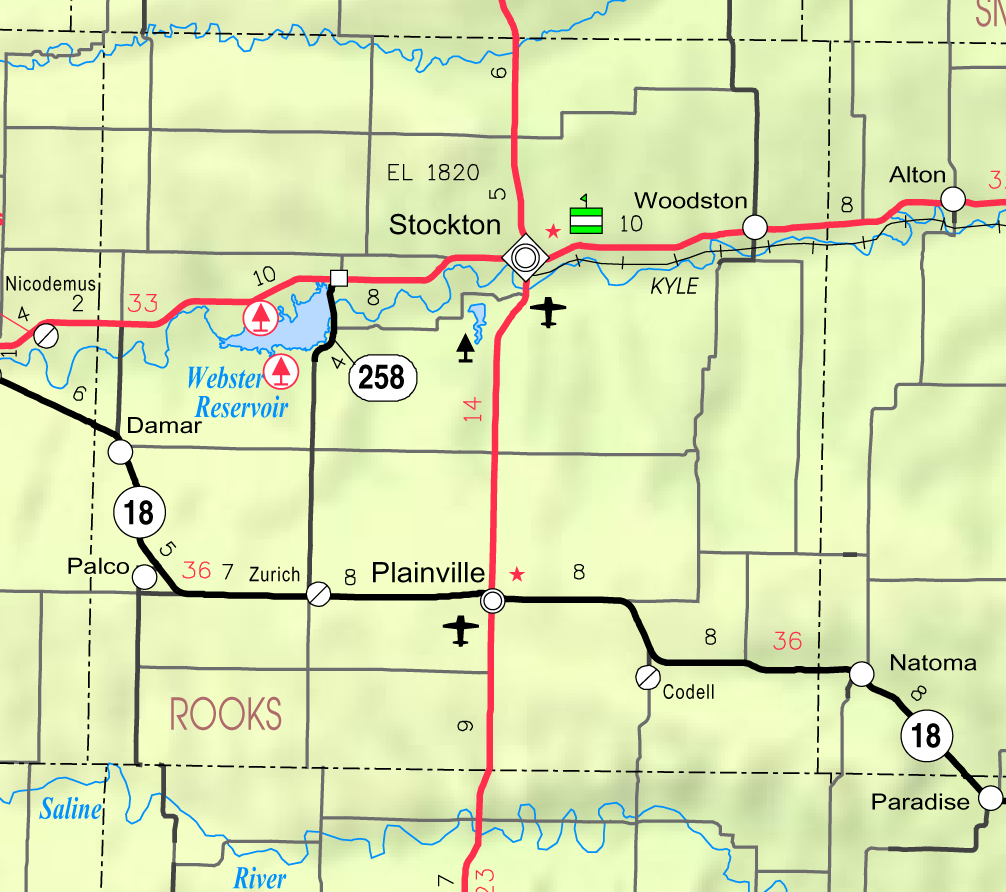
- KDOT map of Rooks County (legend)

- Location within Kansas Location within the United States
- Coordinates: 39°22′50″N 99°08′21″W
- Country: United States
- State: Kansas
- County: Rooks
- Elevation: 1,831 ft (558 m)

Population
  - Total: 0
- Time zone: UTC-6 (CST)
  - Summer (DST): UTC-5 (CDT)
- Area code: 785

Survey is a ghost town in Medicine Township, Rooks County, Kansas, United States.

== History ==
Survey was issued a post office in 1880. The post office was discontinued in 1890. There is nothing left of Survey. There is a Survey Cemetery still in existence.
