= Township 9, Rooks County, Kansas =

Township in Rooks County, Kansas, U.S.

Township 9
- Township
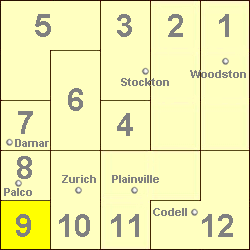
- Location in Rooks County

- Location within state of Kansas
- Coordinates: 39°10′34″N 99°32′58″W
- Country: United States
- State: Kansas
- County: Rooks
- Established: 1925 (as Fairview Township)

Area
  - Total: 36.109 sq mi (93.52 km^{2})
  - Land: 36.091 sq mi (93.48 km^{2})
  - Water: 0.018 sq mi (0.047 km^{2}) 0.05%
- Elevation: 2,133 ft (650 m)

Population (2020)
  - Total: 45
  - Density: 1.2/sq mi (0.48/km^{2})
- Time zone: UTC-6 (CST)
  - Summer (DST): UTC-5 (CDT)
- Area code: 785
- GNIS feature ID: 485305

Township 9 is a township in Rooks County, Kansas, United States. As of the 2020 census, its population was 45.

== History ==
Rooks County was established with four townships: Bow Creek, Lowell, Paradise and Stockton. That number increased to seven by 1878 and twenty three in 1925. The twenty three townships were in place until 1971 when the number was reduced to the current twelve townships.

Township 9 was formed by renaming Fairview Township in 1971. While other Rooks County townships were combined pursuant to Kansas Statute 80-1110, Fairview was just renamed using the new naming standard.

=== Fairview Township ===
Fairview Township was established in 1925 from part of Walton Township. Walton Township was formed from Plainville Township. Plainville Township from Paradise Township.

== Geography ==
Township 9 covers an area of 36.109 square miles (93.52 square kilometers).

=== Adjacent townships ===
Township 8, Rooks County
		north
Morlan Township, Graham County	west	self	east	Township 10, Rooks County
Ogallah Township, Trego County	southwest	south
Buckeye Township, Ellis County
