= Laton, Kansas =

- Ghost town
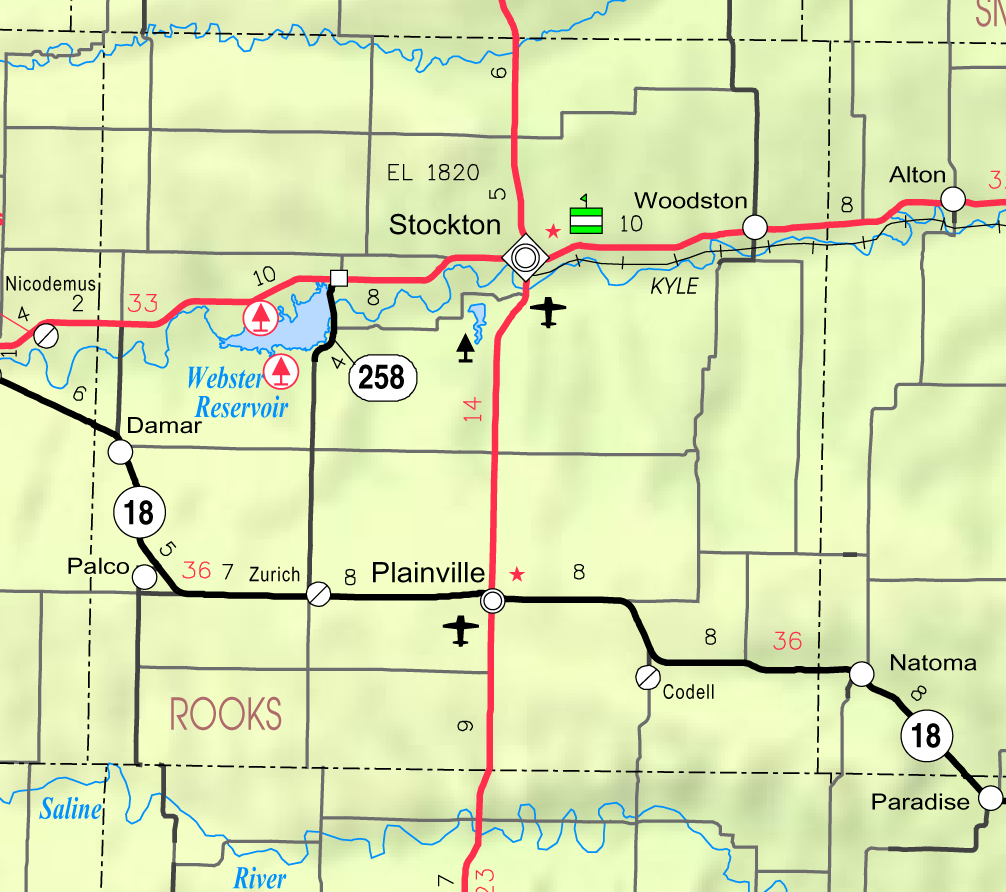
- KDOT map of Rooks County (legend)

- Location within Kansas Location within the United States
- Coordinates: 39°17′08″N 99°04′36″W
- Country: United States
- State: Kansas
- County: Rooks
- Elevation: 2,073 ft (632 m)

Population
  - Total: 0
- Time zone: UTC-6 (CST)
  - Summer (DST): UTC-5 (CDT)
- Area code: 785
- GNIS ID: 484596

Laton is a ghost town in Corning Township, Rooks County, Kansas, United States.

== History ==
Eagle Creek was issued a post office in 1878. In 1884, the post office name was changed to Laton before being discontinued in 1904. In addition to the post office Laton had a school, store, cream station, garage, blacksmith shop, and telephone office. The population in 1910 was 30.

The Midland Trail (Red Line Highway) passed through Laton on its initial route in 1914. The creation of U.S Route 40N (US-24) to the north and K-18 highway to the south bypassed Laton.

Laton School District R-5, Rooks County, Kansas was disorganized in 1962. There is now nothing left of Laton.
