= Township 10, Rooks County, Kansas =

Township in Rooks County, Kansas, U.S.

Township 10
- Township
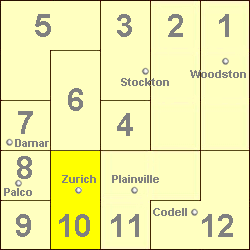
- Location in Rooks County

- Location within state of Kansas
- Coordinates: 39°13′12″N 99°26′16″W
- Country: United States
- State: Kansas
- County: Rooks
- Established: 1971

Area
  - Total: 72.146 sq mi (186.86 km^{2})
  - Land: 72.086 sq mi (186.70 km^{2})
  - Water: 0.06 sq mi (0.16 km^{2}) 0.08%
- Elevation: 2,201 ft (671 m)

Population (2020)
  - Total: 173
  - Density: 2.40/sq mi (0.927/km^{2})
- Time zone: UTC-6 (CST)
  - Summer (DST): UTC-5 (CDT)
- Area code: 785
- GNIS feature ID: 472372

Township 10 is a township in Rooks County, Kansas, United States. As of the 2020 census, its population was 173. Zurich is the largest population center in Township 10.

== History ==
Rooks County was established with four townships: Bow Creek, Lowell, Paradise and Stockton. That number increased to seven by 1878 and twenty three in 1925. The twenty three townships were in place until 1971 when the number was reduced to the current twelve townships.

Township 10 was formed from Rooks County townships Logan and Walton in 1971, pursuant to Kansas Statute 80–1110. Statute 80-1110 allowed for the disestablishment of townships and assigning those territories to contiguous townships.

=== Logan Township ===
Logan Township was established in 1880 from part of Plainville Township.

=== Walton Township ===
Walton Township was created from part of Plainville Township around 1880. The township, named for settler Tom Walton, was a double township until Fairview Township was created in 1925.

== Geography ==
Township 10 covers an area of 72.146 square miles (186.86 square kilometers). Sand Creek originates in Township 10, then flows southeast into the Saline River in Ellis County.

=== Communities ===
- Zurich

=== Adjacent townships ===
Township 6, Rooks County
| Township 7, Rooks County | northwest | north | northeast | Township 4, Rooks County |
| Township 8, Rooks County | west | self | east | Township 11, Rooks County |
| Township 9, Rooks County | southwest | south |
Buckeye Township, Ellis County

== Transportation ==
=== Major highways ===
- K-18
