= Rooks County, Kansas =

County in Kansas, United States

- County
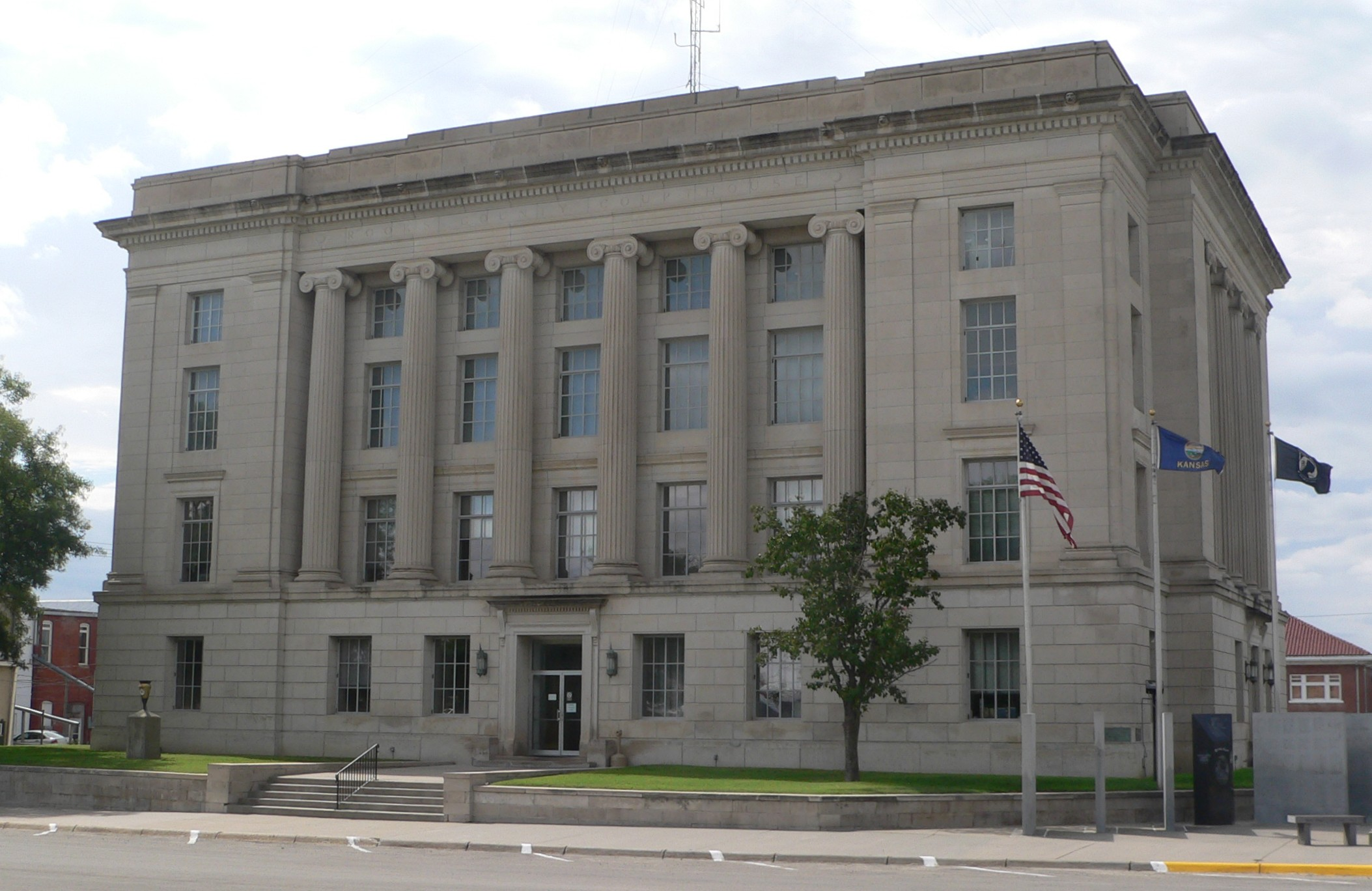
- Rooks County Courthouse in Stockton (2014)

- Location within the U.S. state of Kansas
- Coordinates: 39°27′05″N 99°06′07″W
- Country: United States
- State: Kansas
- Founded: February 26, 1867
- Named for: John C. Rooks
- Seat: Stockton
- Largest city: Plainville

Area
  - Total: 895 sq mi (2,320 km^{2})
  - Land: 891 sq mi (2,310 km^{2})
  - Water: 4.6 sq mi (12 km^{2}) 0.5%

Population (2020)
  - Total: 4,919
  - Estimate (2026): 4,046 ▼
  - Density: 5.5/sq mi (2.1/km^{2})
- Time zone: UTC−6 (Central)
  - Summer (DST): UTC−5 (CDT)
- Congressional district: 1st
- Website: rookscountyks.gov

Rooks County is a county located in the U.S. state of Kansas. Its county seat is Stockton, and its largest city is Plainville. As of the 2020 census, the county population was 4,919. The county was named for John C. Rooks, a private in Company I of the 11th Kansas Cavalry Regiment, who died at the Battle of Prairie Grove during the American Civil War.

== History ==
=== Early history ===
For many millennia, the Great Plains of North America was inhabited by nomadic Native Americans. From the 16th century to 18th century, the Kingdom of France claimed ownership of large parts of North America. In 1762, after the French and Indian War, France secretly ceded New France to Spain, per the Treaty of Fontainebleau.

=== 19th century ===
In 1802, Spain returned most of the land to France, but keeping title to about 7,500 square miles. In 1803, most of the land for modern day Kansas was acquired by the United States from France as part of the 828,000 square mile Louisiana Purchase for 2.83 cents per acre.

In 1854, the Kansas Territory was organized, then in 1861 Kansas became the 34th U.S. state. In 1867, Rooks County was established.

In 1881, the first county courthouse was built in Stockton. The county jail was built nearby from cottonwood logs strengthened by tons of iron.

=== 20th century ===
In 1923, a new courthouse opened in Stockton. The Rooks County Courthouse was added to the National Register of Historic Places in 2002.

== Geography ==
According to the U.S. Census Bureau, the county has a total area of 895 square miles (2,320 km^{2}), of which 891 square miles (2,310 km^{2}) is land and 4.6 square miles (12 km^{2}) (0.5%) is water.

=== Adjacent counties ===
- Phillips County (north)
- Smith County (northeast)
- Osborne County (east)
- Ellis County (south)
- Trego County (southwest)
- Graham County (west)

== Demographics ==
Historical population
| Census | Pop. | Note | %± |
|---|---|---|---|
| 1880 | 8,112 | | — |
| 1890 | 8,018 | | −1.2% |
| 1900 | 7,960 | | −0.7% |
| 1910 | 11,282 | | 41.7% |
| 1920 | 9,966 | | −11.7% |
| 1930 | 9,534 | | −4.3% |
| 1940 | 8,497 | | −10.9% |
| 1950 | 9,043 | | 6.4% |
| 1960 | 9,734 | | 7.6% |
| 1970 | 7,628 | | −21.6% |
| 1980 | 7,006 | | −8.2% |
| 1990 | 6,039 | | −13.8% |
| 2000 | 5,685 | | −5.9% |
| 2010 | 5,181 | | −8.9% |
| 2020 | 4,919 | | −5.1% |
| 2025 (est.) | 4,646 | ▼ | −5.5% |
U.S. Decennial Census; 1790-1960 1900-1990; 1990-2000 2010-2020

=== 2020 census ===
As of the 2020 census, the county had a population of 4,919. The median age was 45.4 years. 22.1% of residents were under the age of 18 and 23.1% of residents were 65 years of age or older. For every 100 females there were 101.0 males, and for every 100 females age 18 and over there were 102.5 males age 18 and over.

The racial makeup of the county was 93.9% White, 0.6% Black or African American, 0.4% American Indian and Alaska Native, 0.1% Asian, 0.2% Native Hawaiian and Pacific Islander, 0.2% from some other race, and 4.5% from two or more races. Hispanic or Latino residents of any race comprised 2.4% of the population.

0.0% of residents lived in urban areas, while 100.0% lived in rural areas.

There were 2,109 households in the county, of which 27.0% had children under the age of 18 living with them and 24.7% had a female householder with no spouse or partner present. About 33.6% of all households were made up of individuals and 17.2% had someone living alone who was 65 years of age or older.

There were 2,638 housing units, of which 20.1% were vacant. Among occupied housing units, 75.7% were owner-occupied and 24.3% were renter-occupied. The homeowner vacancy rate was 3.0% and the rental vacancy rate was 14.8%.

=== 2000 census ===
As of the census of 2000, there were 5,685 people, 2,362 households, and 1,556 families residing in the county. The population density was 6 people per square mile (2.3 people/km^{2}). There were 2,758 housing units at an average density of 3 per square mile (1.2/km^{2}). The racial makeup of the county was 97.13% White, 1.13% Black or African American, 0.42% Native American, 0.19% Asian, 0.02% Pacific Islander, 0.37% from other races, and 0.74% from two or more races. 1.06% of the population were Hispanic or Latino of any race.

There were 2,362 households, out of which 29.10% had children under the age of 18 living with them, 55.40% were married couples living together, 7.20% had a female householder with no husband present, and 34.10% were non-families. 31.80% of all households were made up of individuals, and 18.50% had someone living alone who was 65 years of age or older. The average household size was 2.32 and the average family size was 2.93.

In the county, the population was spread out, with 25.20% under the age of 18, 6.40% from 18 to 24, 25.50% from 25 to 44, 21.50% from 45 to 64, and 21.50% who were 65 years of age or older. The median age was 40 years. For every 100 females there were 98.10 males. For every 100 females age 18 and over, there were 94.30 males.

The median income for a household in the county was $30,457, and the median income for a family was $36,931. Males had a median income of $26,794 versus $18,389 for females. The per capita income for the county was $15,588. About 7.30% of families and 9.80% of the population were below the poverty line, including 9.70% of those under age 18 and 7.40% of those age 65 or over.

== Government ==
=== Presidential elections ===
Presidential election results

United States presidential election results for Rooks County, Kansas
| Year | Republican | | Democratic | | Third party(ies) | |
| Year | No. | % | No. | % | No. | % |
|---|---|---|---|---|---|---|
| 1888 | 1,112 | 58.31% | 412 | 21.60% | 383 | 20.08% |
| 1892 | 811 | 47.93% | 0 | 0.00% | 881 | 52.07% |
| 1896 | 817 | 45.09% | 971 | 53.59% | 24 | 1.32% |
| 1900 | 927 | 49.28% | 925 | 49.18% | 29 | 1.54% |
| 1904 | 1,266 | 64.46% | 495 | 25.20% | 203 | 10.34% |
| 1908 | 1,280 | 53.13% | 1,003 | 41.64% | 126 | 5.23% |
| 1912 | 545 | 24.14% | 865 | 38.31% | 848 | 37.56% |
| 1916 | 1,621 | 38.29% | 2,394 | 56.54% | 219 | 5.17% |
| 1920 | 2,143 | 69.94% | 843 | 27.51% | 78 | 2.55% |
| 1924 | 2,442 | 66.02% | 930 | 25.14% | 327 | 8.84% |
| 1928 | 2,583 | 70.73% | 1,044 | 28.59% | 25 | 0.68% |
| 1932 | 2,005 | 46.39% | 2,229 | 51.57% | 88 | 2.04% |
| 1936 | 2,150 | 49.03% | 2,235 | 50.97% | 0 | 0.00% |
| 1940 | 2,590 | 60.61% | 1,650 | 38.61% | 33 | 0.77% |
| 1944 | 2,361 | 66.53% | 1,166 | 32.85% | 22 | 0.62% |
| 1948 | 2,197 | 56.59% | 1,636 | 42.14% | 49 | 1.26% |
| 1952 | 3,331 | 74.32% | 1,105 | 24.65% | 46 | 1.03% |
| 1956 | 3,059 | 70.88% | 1,238 | 28.68% | 19 | 0.44% |
| 1960 | 2,840 | 63.25% | 1,639 | 36.50% | 11 | 0.24% |
| 1964 | 1,985 | 50.59% | 1,923 | 49.01% | 16 | 0.41% |
| 1968 | 2,252 | 63.01% | 1,012 | 28.32% | 310 | 8.67% |
| 1972 | 2,457 | 71.74% | 904 | 26.39% | 64 | 1.87% |
| 1976 | 1,664 | 53.04% | 1,412 | 45.01% | 61 | 1.94% |
| 1980 | 2,275 | 71.38% | 725 | 22.75% | 187 | 5.87% |
| 1984 | 2,604 | 77.75% | 699 | 20.87% | 46 | 1.37% |
| 1988 | 1,938 | 64.45% | 1,012 | 33.65% | 57 | 1.90% |
| 1992 | 1,249 | 40.42% | 771 | 24.95% | 1,070 | 34.63% |
| 1996 | 1,864 | 66.88% | 650 | 23.32% | 273 | 9.80% |
| 2000 | 2,016 | 72.65% | 597 | 21.51% | 162 | 5.84% |
| 2004 | 2,121 | 78.27% | 534 | 19.70% | 55 | 2.03% |
| 2008 | 2,068 | 79.91% | 468 | 18.08% | 52 | 2.01% |
| 2012 | 2,038 | 82.85% | 361 | 14.67% | 61 | 2.48% |
| 2016 | 2,031 | 83.96% | 275 | 11.37% | 113 | 4.67% |
| 2020 | 2,325 | 86.14% | 339 | 12.56% | 35 | 1.30% |
| 2024 | 2,153 | 84.96% | 349 | 13.77% | 32 | 1.26% |

Rooks County is overwhelmingly Republican. No Democratic presidential candidate has won Rooks County since Franklin D. Roosevelt – ironically against Kansan Alf Landon – carried the county by eighty-five votes in 1936. The last Democrat to exceed a quarter of the county's vote was Michael Dukakis in 1988 during a major drought on the Great Plains.

=== Laws ===
Following amendment to the Kansas Constitution in 1986, the county remained a prohibition, or "dry", county until 2000, when voters approved the sale of alcoholic liquor by the individual drink with a 30 percent food sales requirement.

== Education ==
=== Unified school districts ===
- Palco USD 269
  - limited to western edge of county; includes Palco, Damar and Zurich
- Plainville USD 270
  - southern half of county, except western edge zoned to Palco
- Stockton USD 271
  - northern half of county

== Communities ==
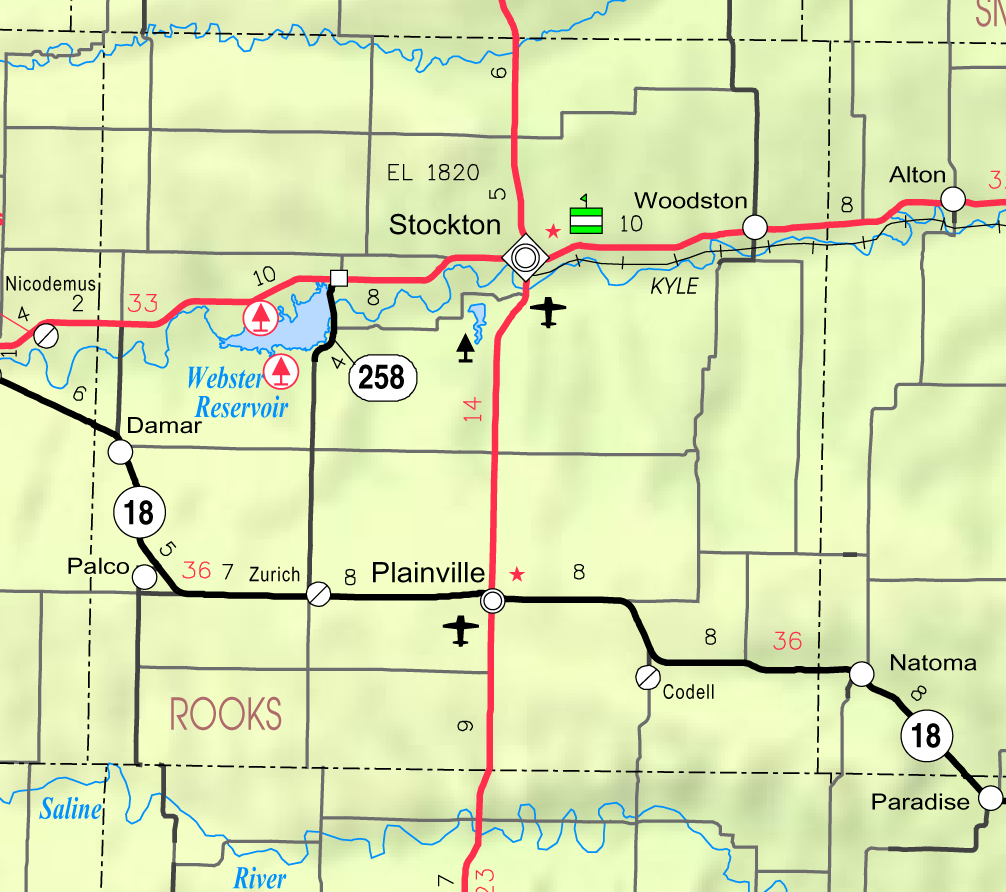
2005 map of Rooks County (map legend)

List of townships / incorporated cities / unincorporated communities / extinct former communities within Rooks County.

=== Cities ===
- Damar
- Palco
- Plainville
- Stockton (county seat)
- Woodston
- Zurich

=== Unincorporated communities ===
† means a community is designated a Census-Designated Place (CDP) by the United States Census Bureau.

- Codell†
- Webster

=== Ghost towns ===
- Adamson
- Alcona
- Amboy
- Chandler
- Cresson
- Earnest
- Frankton
- Gould City
- Highhill
- Hoskins
- Igo
- Laton
- McHale
- Motor
- Nyra
- Portage
- Slate
- Sugarloaf
- Survey
- Rockport

=== Townships ===
Rooks County is divided into twelve townships. None of the cities within the county are considered governmentally independent, and all figures for the townships include those of the cities. In the following table, the population center is the largest city (or cities) included in that township's population total, if it is of a significant size.

Sources: 2000 U.S. Gazetteer from the U.S. Census Bureau.
| Township | FIPS | Population center | Population | Population density /km^{2} (/sq mi) | Land area km^{2} (sq mi) | Water area km^{2} (sq mi) | Water % | Geographic coordinates |
|---|---|---|---|---|---|---|---|---|
| Township 1 | 71203 | | 280 | 1 (3) | 276 (107) | 1 (0) | 0.23% | 39°27′6″N 99°6′8″W |
| Township 2 | 71207 | | 382 | 1 (4) | 278 (107) | 1 (0) | 0.25% | 39°26′33″N 99°13′22″W |
| Township 3 | 71211 | Stockton | 1,489 | 8 (21) | 184 (71) | 0 (0) | 0.14% | 39°27′13″N 99°17′35″W |
| Township 4 | 71215 | | 27 | 0 (1) | 93 (36) | 0 (0) | 0.12% | 39°21′11″N 99°18′36″W |
| Township 5 | 71219 | | 74 | 0 (1) | 276 (107) | 0 (0) | 0.05% | 39°30′10″N 99°30′0″W |
| Township 6 | 71224 | | 60 | 0 (1) | 173 (67) | 13 (5) | 7.13% | 39°24′44″N 99°26′24″W |
| Township 7 | 71229 | | 218 | 2 (6) | 91 (35) | 1 (0) | 0.93% | 39°20′37″N 99°33′24″W |
| Township 8 | 71234 | | 344 | 4 (10) | 94 (36) | 0 (0) | 0.09% | 39°15′20″N 99°33′33″W |
| Township 9 | 71239 | | 51 | 1 (1) | 94 (36) | 0 (0) | 0.05% | 39°10′31″N 99°32′20″W |
| Township 10 | 71243 | | 197 | 1 (3) | 187 (72) | 0 (0) | 0.08% | 39°14′5″N 99°26′0″W |
| Township 11 | 71246 | Plainville | 2,380 | 9 (22) | 279 (108) | 1 (0) | 0.44% | 39°14′13″N 99°17′39″W |
| Township 12 | 71249 | | 183 | 1 (2) | 277 (107) | 1 (0) | 0.24% | 39°12′56″N 99°9′10″W |

== See also ==
Community information for Kansas

- Kansas locations by per capita income
- List of counties in Kansas
- List of townships in Kansas
- List of cities in Kansas
- List of unincorporated communities in Kansas
- List of ghost towns in Kansas
