= Township 11, Rooks County, Kansas =

Township in Rooks County, Kansas, U.S.

Township 11
- Township
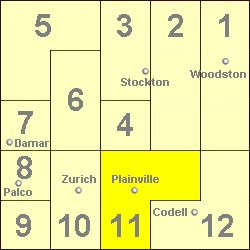
- Location in Rooks County

- Location within state of Kansas
- Coordinates: 39°14′03″N 99°17′20″W
- Country: United States
- State: Kansas
- County: Rooks
- Established: 1971

Area
  - Total: 108.051 sq mi (279.85 km^{2})
  - Land: 107.614 sq mi (278.72 km^{2})
  - Water: 0.437 sq mi (1.13 km^{2}) 0.40%
- Elevation: 2,149 ft (655 m)

Population (2020)
  - Total: 2,063
  - Density: 19.17/sq mi (7.402/km^{2})
- Time zone: UTC-6 (CST)
  - Summer (DST): UTC-5 (CDT)
- Area code: 785
- GNIS feature ID: 472373

Township 11 is a township in Rooks County, Kansas, United States. As of the 2020 census, its population was 2,063. Plainville is the largest population center in Township 11.

== History ==
Rooks County was established with four townships: Bow Creek, Lowell, Paradise and Stockton. That number increased to seven by 1878 and twenty three in 1925. The twenty three townships were in place until 1971 when the number was reduced to the current twelve townships.

Township 11 was formed from Rooks County townships Plainville and Twin Mound in 1971 pursuant to Kansas Statute 80-1110. 80-1110 allowed for the disorganization of townships and assigning those territories to contiguous townships.

=== Plainville Township ===
Plainville Township was established in 1879 from Paradise Township. Fairview, Logan, Northampton and Walton townships were eventually formed from parts of Plainville township. Plainville remained a double township until Township 11 was created.

=== Twin Mound Township ===
Twin Mound Township was established in 1879 from part of Paradise Township. The township was named for two unique blue-green, hard rock mounds that bore the Twin Mound name.

== Geography ==
Township 11 covers an area of 108.051 square miles (279.85 square kilometers). Paradise Creek, labeled as Salt Creek on early maps, originates in Township 11 then flows eastward into the Saline River in Russell County.

=== Communities ===
- Plainville

=== Adjacent townships ===
Township 4, Rooks County; Township 2, Rooks County
Township 6, Rooks County	northwest	north	northeast	Township 1, Rooks County
Township 10, Rooks County	west	self	east	Township 12, Rooks County
		south
Buckeye Township, Ellis County

== Transportation ==
=== Major highways ===
- US-183
- K-18
