= Wildhorse Township, Kansas =

Wildhorse Township
- Township
- Location in Graham County
- Coordinates: 39°20′00″N 099°46′01″W
- Country: United States
- State: Kansas
- County: Graham

Area
  - Total: 53.10 sq mi (137.54 km^{2})
  - Land: 53.07 sq mi (137.46 km^{2})
  - Water: 0.031 sq mi (0.08 km^{2}) 0.06%
- Elevation: 2,175 ft (663 m)

Population (2020)
  - Total: 229
  - Density: 4.31/sq mi (1.67/km^{2})
- GNIS feature ID: 0472211

Wildhorse Township is a township in Graham County, Kansas, United States. As of the 2020 census, its population was 229.

== Geography ==
Wildhorse Township covers an area of 53.1 square miles (138 km^{2}) and contains one incorporated settlement, Bogue. According to the USGS, it contains three cemeteries: Fagan, Samuels and Wild Horse.

The streams of Coon Creek, Skunk Creek, West Branch Wild Horse Creek and Wild Horse Creek run through this township.
