= Stockton, Kansas =

City in Rooks County, Kansas

- City and County seat
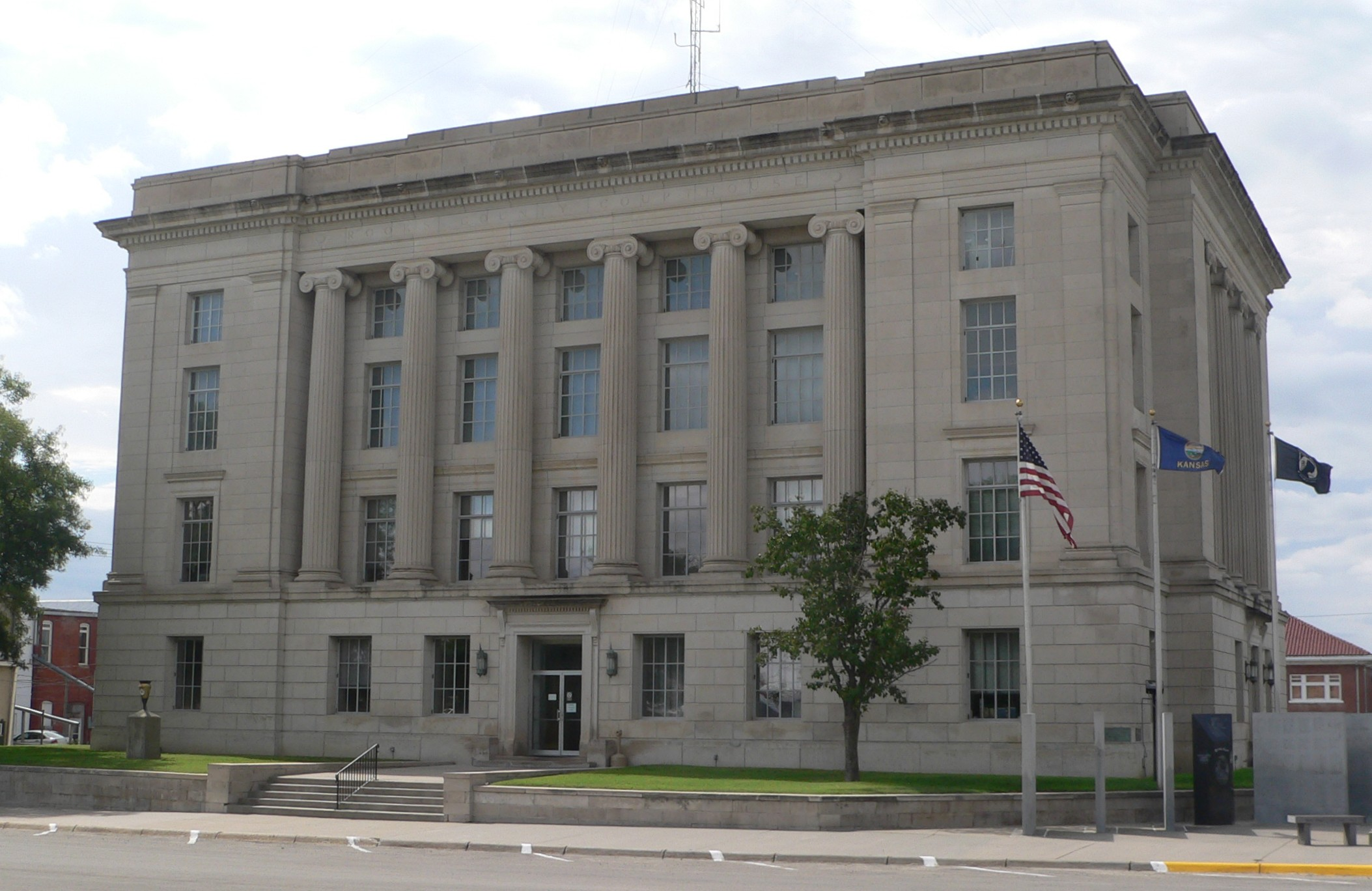
- Rooks County Courthouse (2014)

- Location within Rooks County and Kansas

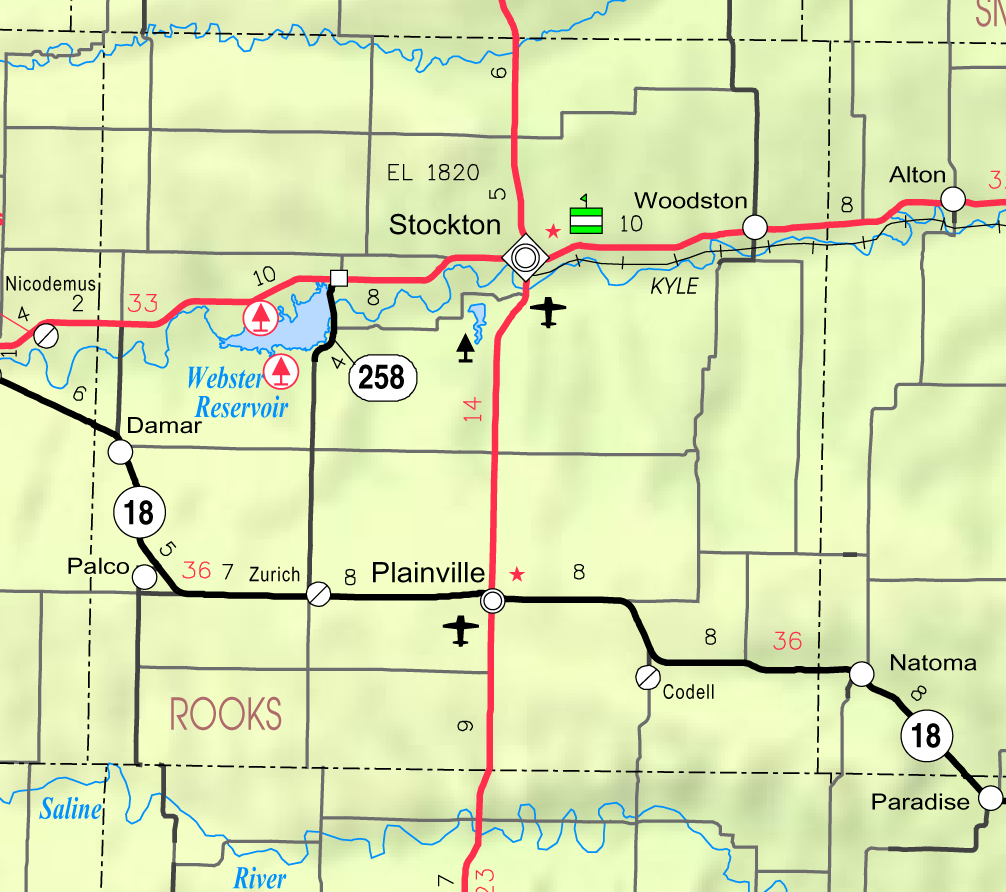
- KDOT map of Rooks County (legend)
- Coordinates: 39°25′30″N 99°16′35″W
- Country: United States
- State: Kansas
- County: Rooks
- Founded: 1872
- Incorporated: 1879
- Named for: Cattle

Area
  - Total: 1.66 sq mi (4.29 km^{2})
  - Land: 1.66 sq mi (4.29 km^{2})
  - Water: 0 sq mi (0.00 km^{2})
- Elevation: 1,762 ft (537 m)

Population (2020)
  - Total: 1,480
  - Density: 894/sq mi (345/km^{2})
- Time zone: UTC-6 (CST)
  - Summer (DST): UTC-5 (CDT)
- ZIP Code: 67669
- Area code: 785
- FIPS code: 20-68350
- GNIS ID: 2395974
- Website: stocktonks.com

Stockton is a city in and the county seat of Rooks County, Kansas, United States. As of the 2020 census, the population of the city was 1,480.

== History ==
=== 19th century ===
Stockton was founded in 1872. A large share of the first settlers were cattle dealers, or stockmen, and they named their new home Stocktown, or as it soon became known, Stockton. Stockton was incorporated as a city in 1879.

Stockton is located on the natural trail up the valley of the South Solomon River and where the military supply trail from Fort Kearney, Nebraska, to Fort Hays, Kansas, crossed the South Solomon River. Stockton survived and grew during the thirteen years from founding until the arrival of the railroad in 1885.

Stockton was once a sundown town, where African Americans living in Nicodemus were not welcome after dark.

=== 20th century ===
Stockton was featured in British author Tony Parker's 1989 book Bird, Kansas for which he transcribed tape recorded interviews with local residents.

== Geography ==
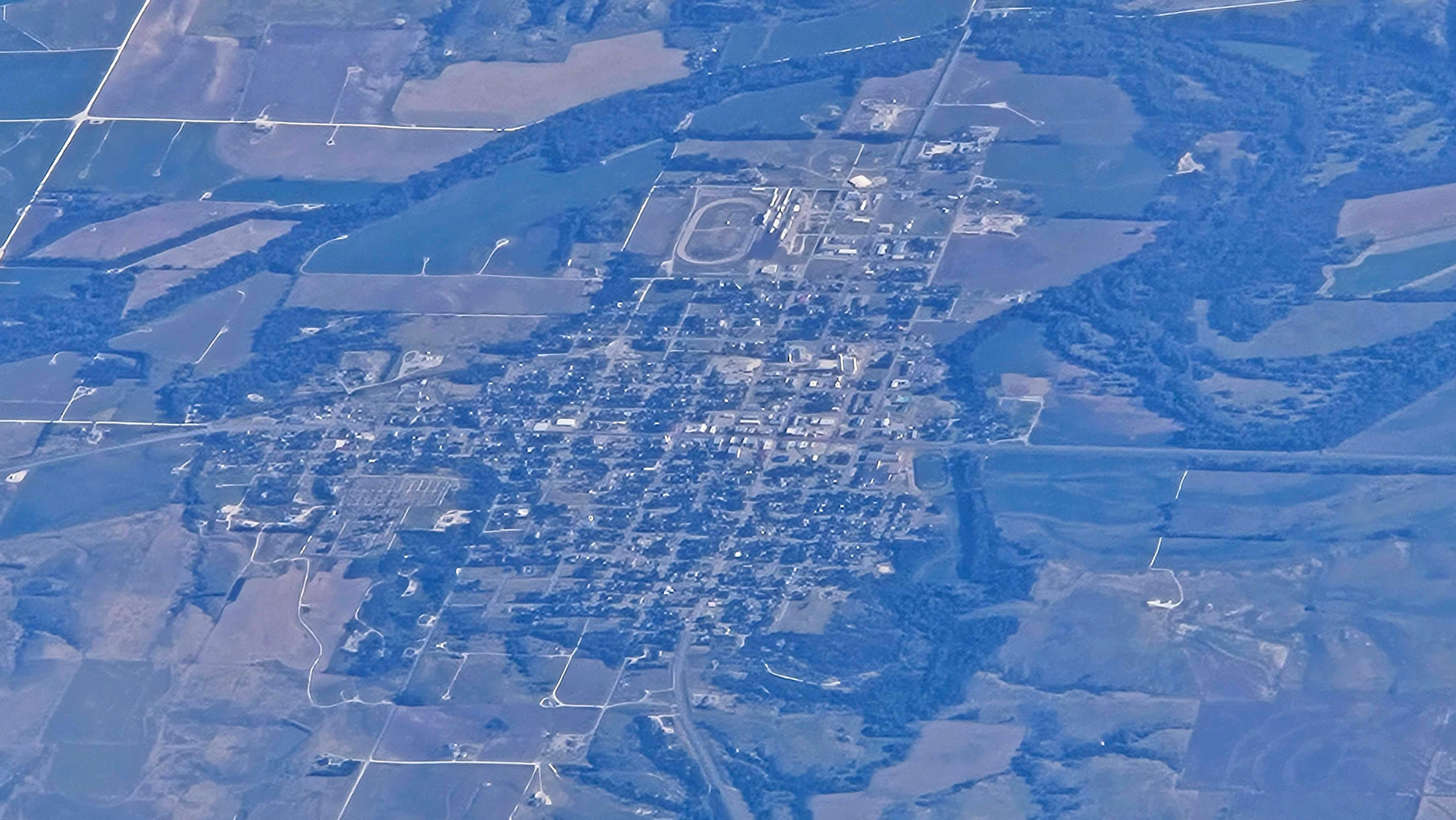
Stockton from above 2023

According to the United States Census Bureau, the city has a total area of 2.23 square miles (5.78 km^{2}), all land.

== Demographics ==
Historical population
Census	Pop.	Note	%±
1880	411		—
1890	880		114.1%
1900	1,030		17.0%
1910	1,317		27.9%
1920	1,324		0.5%
1930	1,291		−2.5%
1940	1,418		9.8%
1950	1,867		31.7%
1970	1,818		—
1980	1,825		0.4%
1990	1,507		−17.4%
2000	1,558		3.4%
2010	1,329		−14.7%
2020	1,480		11.4%
U.S. Decennial Census

=== 2010 census ===
As of the census of 2010, there were 1,329 people, 606 households, and 369 families residing in the city. The population density was 596.0 inhabitants per square mile (230.1/km^{2}). There were 743 housing units at an average density of 333.2 per square mile (128.6/km^{2}). The racial makeup of the city was 97.1% White, 0.5% African American, 0.6% Native American, 0.2% Asian, 0.2% from other races, and 1.4% from two or more races. Hispanic or Latino of any race were 2.3% of the population.

There were 606 households, of which 26.2% had children under the age of 18 living with them, 47.5% were married couples living together, 9.4% had a female householder with no husband present, 4.0% had a male householder with no wife present, and 39.1% were non-families. 36.1% of all households were made up of individuals, and 17% had someone living alone who was 65 years of age or older. The average household size was 2.13 and the average family size was 2.74.

The median age in the city was 46.1 years. 21.2% of residents were under the age of 18; 7.3% were between the ages of 18 and 24; 19.7% were from 25 to 44; 30.7% were from 45 to 64; and 21.1% were 65 years of age or older. The gender makeup of the city was 47.2% male and 52.8% female.

=== 2000 census ===
As of the census of 2000, there were 1,558 people, 636 households, and 403 families residing in the city. The population density was 1,198.2 inhabitants per square mile (462.6/km^{2}). There were 745 housing units at an average density of 573.0 per square mile (221.2/km^{2}). The racial makeup of the city was 93.97% White, 2.82% African American, 0.58% Native American, 0.19% Asian, 1.16% from other races, and 1.28% from two or more races. Hispanic or Latino of any race were 1.93% of the population.

There were 636 households, out of which 28.8% had children under the age of 18 living with them, 50.9% were married couples living together, 9.7% had a female householder with no husband present, and 36.5% were non-families. 35.4% of all households were made up of individuals, and 23.4% had someone living alone who was 65 years of age or older. The average household size was 2.21 and the average family size was 2.85.

In the city, the population was spread out, with 22.9% under the age of 18, 5.5% from 18 to 24, 26.8% from 25 to 44, 19.7% from 45 to 64, and 25.0% who were 65 years of age or older. The median age was 42 years. For every 100 females, there were 102.9 males. For every 100 females age 18 and over, there were 99.5 males.

The median income for a household in the city was $31,125, and the median income for a family was $38,603. Males had a median income of $26,458 versus $19,688 for females. The per capita income for the city was $17,205. About 6.3% of families and 9.1% of the population were below the poverty line, including 14.4% of those under age 18 and 8.0% of those age 65 or over.

== Area attractions ==
- Rooks County Historical Society Frank Walker Museum

== Education ==
The community is served by Stockton USD 271 public school district.

== Notable people ==
Notable individuals who were born in and/or have lived in Stockton include:

- Dale Dodrill (1926-2019), football defensive tackle
- Roy Fisher (1918-1999), editor, reporter
- Lorenzo Fuller (1919-2011), singer, musician and actor.
- Mal Stevens (1900-1979), football halfback, coach, surgeon

== See also ==
- List of sundown towns in the United States
- Webster Reservoir and Webster State Park
