= Township 5, Rooks County, Kansas =

Township in Rooks County, Kansas, U.S.

Township 5
- Township
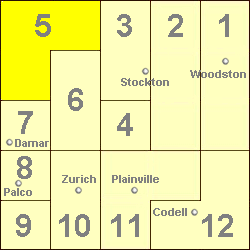
- Location in Rooks County

- Location within state of Kansas
- Coordinates: 39°29′44″N 99°30′32″W
- Country: United States
- State: Kansas
- County: Rooks
- Established: 1971

Area
  - Total: 106.857 sq mi (276.76 km^{2})
  - Land: 106.806 sq mi (276.63 km^{2})
  - Water: 0.051 sq mi (0.13 km^{2}) 0.05%
- Elevation: 2,113 ft (644 m)

Population (2020)
  - Total: 64
  - Density: 0.60/sq mi (0.23/km^{2})
- Time zone: UTC-6 (CST)
  - Summer (DST): UTC-5 (CDT)
- Area code: 785
- GNIS feature ID: 472125

Township 5 is a township in Rooks County, Kansas, United States. As of the 2020 census, its population was 64.

== History ==
Rooks County was established with four townships: Bow Creek, Lowell, Paradise and Stockton. That number increased to seven by 1878 and twenty three in 1925. The twenty three townships were in place until 1971 when the number was reduced to the current twelve townships.

Township 5 was formed from Rooks County townships Alcona, Bow Creek and Sugar Loaf in 1971, pursuant to Kansas Statute 80-1110. The statute allowed for the dissolution of townships and assigning those territories to contiguous townships.

Bow Creek flows through Township 5, then on to Kirwin Reservoir in Phillips County.

=== Alcona Township ===
Alcona Township was established in 1879 from part of Stockton Township.

=== Bow Creek Township ===
Bow Creek was one of the original four Rooks County civil townships along with Lowell, Paradise and Stockton. The original Bow Creek Township was 6 miles north to south (1 survey township). The east border was with Lowell Township, 9 miles (1 1/2 survey townships) from the Osborne County line. The west border was the Graham County line, making Bow Creek 21 miles (3 1/2 survey townships) wide. Farmington, Sugar Loaf and the west half of Lanark townships were originally part of Bow Creek Township.

Bow Creek Township was named for Bow Creek, which flowed through the township.

=== Sugar Loaf Township ===
Sugar Loaf Township was established in 1880 from part of Bow Creek Township. The township was named for a unique rounded mound of flint rock that was once used as a lookout by Native Americans.

== Geography ==
Township 5 covers an area of 106.857 square miles (276.76 square kilometers).

=== Adjacent townships ===
Plainview Township, Phillips County
		north	northeast	Rushville Township, Phillips County
Pioneer Township, Graham County	west	self	east	Township 3, Rooks County
Nicodemus Township, Graham County	southwest	south	southeast	Township 6, Rooks County
Township 7, Rooks County

== Transportation ==
=== Major highways ===
- US-24
