= Highland-District 2 Township, Kansas =

Township in Norton County, Kansas, U.S.

Highland-District 2 Township
- Township
- Location within Norton County
- Coordinates: 39.692218°N 100.031174°W
- Country: United States
- State: Kansas
- County: Norton

Area
  - Total: 292.011 sq mi (756.31 km^{2})
  - Land: 289.001 sq mi (748.51 km^{2})
  - Water: 3.01 sq mi (7.8 km^{2}) 1.03%

Population (2020)
  - Total: 546
  - Density: 1.89/sq mi (0.729/km^{2})
- Time zone: UTC-6 (CST)
  - Summer (DST): UTC-5 (CDT)
- Area code: 785

Highland-District 2 Township is a township in Norton County, Kansas, United States. As of the 2020 census, its population was 546.

== Geography ==
Highland-District 2 Township covers an area of 292.011 square miles (756.31 square kilometers). Prairie Dog State Park and Keith Sebelius Lake are located within the township.

=== Communities ===
- part of Clayton
- Lenora
- New Almelo
- Oronoque
- Reager

=== Adjacent townships ===
- Center-District 1 Township, Norton County (north)
- Solomon-District 3 Township, Norton County (east)
- Graham Township, Graham County (southeast)
- Indiana Township, Graham County (south-southeast)
- Allodium Township, Graham County (south)
- Adell Township, Sheridan County (southwest)
- Allison Township, Decatur County (west-southwest)
- Pleasant Valley Township, Decatur County (west)
- Garfield Township, Decatur County (west-northwest)
- Lincoln Township, Decatur County (northwest)

=== Major highways ===
- US-36
- US-283
- K-9
- K-383
