= K-123 (Kansas highway) =

State highway in Kansas, U.S.

K-123
- K-123 highlighted in red

Route information
- Maintained by KDOT
- Length: 5.544 mi (8.922 km)
- Existed: c. 1940–present

Major junctions
- South end: K-23 north of Hoxie
- K-9 south of Dresden
- North end: K-383 in Dresden

Location
- Country: United States
- State: Kansas
- Counties: Sheridan, Decatur

Highway system
- Kansas State Highway System; Interstate; US; State; Spurs
← K-121	→ K-124

K-123 is a 5 1/2-mile-long (8.9 km) state highway in the U.S. state of Kansas. The southern terminus is at K-23 north of Hoxie, and the northern terminus is at K-383 in Dresden. Along the way K-123 intersects the western terminus of K-9 south of Dresden.

Between 1938 and 1940, K-123 was created to replace the former alignment of K-23 from K-9 to Dresden. Between 1944 and 1945, K-9 was realigned to end at US-83 in Dresden. Then between 1953 and 1956, K-9 was realigned to start at K-123 south of Dresden. In 1981, K-123's northern terminus, US-383 was redesignated as K-383.

== Route description ==
K-123 begins at K-23 north of the city of Hoxie and begins travelling east through rural farmlands. After one mile (1.6 km) it curves north at an intersection with 10E and 140N. Another one mile (1.6 km) farther north K-123 intersects the western terminus of K-9, as it enters Decatur County. The landscape begins to transition to rolling hills as it continues north for about 1.4 miles (2.3 km) then crosses an unnamed creek. The landscape begins to transition back to rural farmlands and then another 1.8 miles (2.9 km) farther north, K-123 enters the city of Dresden. The highway continues north through the city for a short distance before reaching its northern terminus at K-383. Past K-383 the roadway continues as locally maintained Kings Avenue.

K-123 is maintained by the Kansas Department of Transportation (KDOT), which is responsible for constructing and maintaining highways in the state. As part of this role, KDOT regularly surveys traffic on their highways. These surveys are most often presented in the form of annual average daily traffic, which is a measurement of the number of vehicles that use a highway during an average day of the year. In 2024, 225 vehicles used the road daily near the southern terminus and 200 vehicles used the road daily near the northern terminus. K-123 is not included in the National Highway System, a system of highways important to the nation's defense, economy, and mobility. K-123 does connect to the National Highway System at its junction with K-383.

== History ==
=== Early roads ===
Before state highways were numbered in Kansas there were auto trails, which were an informal network of marked routes that existed in the United States and Canada in the early part of the 20th century. The former Pikes Peak Ocean to Ocean Highway followed K-123's northern terminus.

=== Establishment and realignments ===
In 1927, the highway that became K-123 was established as K-23. Between July 1938 and 1940, US-183 was realigned to go east from Oberlin along US-36. At this time K-23 was realigned to follow K-9 west to US-83, then north to US-36 and US-183 in Oberlin. K-123 was created to replace the former alignment of K-23 from K-9 to Dresden. At their spring 1941 meeting, the American Association of State Highway and Transportation Officials (AASHO) approved to swap US-183 and US-83 within Nebraska and a small portion into Kansas, and US-383 was assigned to the former alignment of US-83 through Dresden. At this time, K-23 was truncated to its present-day northern terminus. Between 1944 and 1945, K-9 was realigned to end at US-83 in Dresden. KDOT passed a resolution on December 20, 1950, which approved K-9 to be realigned to start at K-123 south of Dresden. By 1956, construction had finished and K-9 was realigned to start at K-123 south of Dresden. AASHTO approved the removal of the US-383 designation at their spring 1979 meeting. On April 1, 1981, KDOT approved a resolution to redesignate K-123's northern terminus to K-383.

== Major intersections ==
County	Location	mi	km	Destinations	Notes
Sheridan	Sheridan–Union township line	0.000	0.000	K-23 – Hoxie	Southern terminus
Sheridan–Decatur county line	Union–Lyon township line	2.000	3.219	K-9 east – New Almelo	Western terminus of K-9
Decatur	Dresden	5.544	8.922	K-383 – Oakley, Norton, Jennings	Northern terminus; former US-383
1.000 mi = 1.609 km; 1.000 km = 0.621 mi
