= Center-District 1 Township, Kansas =

Township in Norton County, Kansas, U.S.

Center-District 1 Township
- Township
- Location within Norton County
- Coordinates: 39.914521°N 99.973117°W
- Country: United States
- State: Kansas
- County: Norton

Area
  - Total: 252.946 sq mi (655.13 km^{2})
  - Land: 252.756 sq mi (654.64 km^{2})
  - Water: 0.19 sq mi (0.49 km^{2}) 0.08%

Population (2020)
  - Total: 1,521
  - Density: 6.018/sq mi (2.323/km^{2})
- Time zone: UTC-6 (CST)
  - Summer (DST): UTC-5 (CDT)
- Area code: 785

Center-District 1 Township is a township in Norton County, Kansas, United States. As of the 2020 census, its population was 1,521. The city of Norton is surrounded by the township but is independent of it.

== Geography ==
Center-District 1 Township covers an area of 252.946 square miles (655.13 square kilometers).

=== Adjacent townships ===
- Almena-District 4 Township, Norton County (east)
- Solomon-District 3 Township, Norton County (southeast)
- Highland-District 2 Township, Norton County (south)
- Garfield Township, Decatur County (southwest)
- Lincoln Township, Decatur County (west-southwest)
- Grant Township, Decatur County (west)

=== Major highways ===
- US-36
- US-283
- K-383
