= Oberlin =

Oberlin may refer to:

== Places in the United States ==
- Oberlin Township, Decatur County, Kansas
  - Oberlin, Kansas, a city in the township
- Oberlin, Louisiana, a town
- Oberlin, Ohio, a city
- Oberlin, Licking County, Ohio, a ghost town
- Oberlin, Michigan, an unincorporated community
- Oberlin, Pennsylvania, a census-designated place
- Mount Oberlin, Glacier National Park, Montana

== Schools ==
- J. F. Oberlin University, a private university in Machida, Tokyo, Japan
- Oberlin College, a liberal arts college in Oberlin, Ohio
- Oberlin High School (Louisiana), Oberlin, Louisiana, United States
- Oberlin High School (Ohio), Oberlin, Ohio, United States
- Oberlin High School, Jamaica

== People ==
- Oberlin (surname)
- Oberlin Smith (1840–1926), American engineer
