= U.S. Route 383 =

Former highway in the United States

U.S. Route 383
- US 383 highlighted in red

Route information
- Auxiliary route of US 83
- Length: 190 mi (310 km)
- Existed: 1942–1982

Major junctions
- South end: US-40 / US-83 in Oakley, KS
- North end: US 30 / US 183 in Elm Creek, NE

Location
- Country: United States

Highway system
- United States Numbered Highway System; List; Special; Divided

U.S. Route 383 was a north–south United States highway. US 383 was created in 1942, and deleted in 1982. After deletion, a portion of the highway became K-383.

== Route description ==
=== Kansas ===
US-383 began in Oakley, heading north along present-day US-83. A short distance north of Oakley, the route intersected I-70. In Halford, US-83/US-383 crossed over US-24. From here, the road turned northeast, where US-383 split from US-83 near Leoville. US-383 continued to the northeast until meeting US-36. At this point, the route turned east for a concurrency with US-36, crossing US-283 in Norton. Past Norton, US-383 split from US-36 and resumed northeast, reaching an intersection with US-183 near Woodruff a short distance south of the Nebraska border.

=== Nebraska ===
In Nebraska, US-383 continued north on the present alignment of US-183, reaching an intersection with US-136 in Alma. Prior to 1964, US-383 continued north past Alma, intersecting US-6/US-34 in Holdrege before ending at US-30 in Elm Creek.

== History ==
When the route was first commissioned in 1942, it ran from Oakley, Kansas to Elm Creek, Nebraska, a distance of 175 miles (282 km). In 1964, the north end of US 383 was truncated to Alma, Nebraska.

== Major intersections ==
| State | County | Location | mi | km | Destinations | Notes |
|---|---|---|---|---|---|---|
| Kansas | Logan | Oakley | 0 | 0.0 | US 40 / US 83 south – Sharon Springs, Wakeeney | Southern end of US 83 overlap |
| Kansas | Thomas | | 20 | 32 | US 24 – Colby, Hoxie | |
| Kansas | Sheridan | | 44 | 71 | US 83 north / K-23 south – Hoxie, Oberlin | Northern end of US 83 overlap |
| Kansas | Decatur | Dresden | 53 | 85 | K-123 south | |
| Kansas | Norton | | 90 | 140 | US 36 west – Oberlin | Southern end of US 36 overlap |
| Kansas | Norton | Norton | 96 | 154 | US 283 – Hill City, Arapahoe Neb. | |
| Kansas | Norton | | 99 | 159 | K-67 north – Norton Correctional Facility | |
| Kansas | Norton | Calvert | 102 | 164 | US 36 east – Phillipsburg | Northern end of US 36 overlap |
| Kansas | Norton | | 107 | 172 | K-60 south | |
| Kansas | Phillips | | 138 | 222 | US 183 south – Phillipsburg | Southern end of US 183 overlap |
| | | | 139 0 | 224 0.0 | Kansas–Nebraska state line | |
| Nebraska | Harlan | | 4 | 6.4 | N-89 – Orleans | |
| Nebraska | Harlan | Alma | 7 | 11 | US 136 east – Franklin | Southern end of US 136 overlap; former N-3 east; northern end of the route after 1964 |
| Nebraska | Harlan | Alma | 9 | 14 | US 136 west – Orleans | Northern end of US 136 overlap; former N-3 west |
| Nebraska | Harlan | | 14 | 23 | Spur 2183 east – Huntley | |
| Nebraska | Harlan | | 21 | 34 | N-4 to US 6 / US 34 – Beatrice | |
| Nebraska | Phelps | Holdrege | 31 | 50 | US 6 / US 34 east – Minden | Southern end of US 6/US 34 overlap |
| Nebraska | Phelps | Holdrege | 32 | 51 | US 6 / US 34 west – Arapahoe | Northern end of US 6/US 34 overlap |
| Nebraska | Buffalo | Elm Creek | 51 | 82 | US 183 north / US 30 (Lincoln Highway) – Kearney, Lexington, Miller | Original northern terminus; northern end of US 183 overlap |
1.000 mi = 1.609 km; 1.000 km = 0.621 mi: Concurrency terminus

== See also ==
=== Related routes ===
- U.S. Route 83
- U.S. Route 183
- U.S. Route 283
- K-383
