= K-223 (Kansas highway) =

State highway in Kansas, U.S.

K-223
- K-223 highlighted in red

Route information
- Maintained by KDOT
- Length: 2.615 mi (4.208 km)
- Existed: July 30, 1958–present

Major junctions
- South end: K-23 north of Hoxie
- North end: K-383 southwest of Dresden

Location
- Country: United States
- State: Kansas
- Counties: Sheridan, Decatur

Highway system
- Kansas State Highway System; Interstate; US; State; Spurs
| ← K-222 | → K-224 |

K-223 is a 2.615-mile-long (4.208 km) state highway in the U.S. state of Kansas. K-223's southern terminus is at K-23 north of Hoxie, and the northern terminus is at K-383 southwest of Dresden. The highway travels through rural farmland and passes through the unincorporated community of Leoville.

K-223 was designated as a state highway in a June 10, 1959 resolution. In 1981, the highways northern terminus was renumbered from US-383 to K-383. The alignment of K-223 has not changed since its creation.

== Route description ==
K-223 begins at K-23 north of Hoxie in north central Sheridan County. The highway begins travelling north through flat rural farmland. After roughly one mile (1.6 km) the highway shifts slightly west as it enters into Decatur County. K-223 continues through farmland, before crossing an unnamed creek, then enters the unincorporated community of Leoville. The highway exits the community then reaches its northern terminus at K-383 southwest of Dresden. North of K-383, the roadway continues as locally maintained 1500th Road.

The route is maintained by KDOT, which is responsible for constructing and maintaining highways in the state. As part of this role, KDOT regularly surveys traffic on their highways. These surveys are most often presented in the form of annual average daily traffic, which is a measurement of the number of vehicles that use a highway during an average day of the year. In 2024, KDOT calculated that on average a total of 53 vehicles, and 22 trucks, used the road daily. K-223 is not included in the National Highway System. The National Highway System is a system of highways important to the nation's defense, economy, and mobility. K-223 does connect to the National Highway System at its junction with K-383.

== History ==
Before state highways were numbered in Kansas there were auto trails, which were an informal network of marked routes that existed in the United States and Canada in the early part of the 20th century. The former Pikes Peak Ocean to Ocean Highway followed K-123's northern terminus.

K-223 was planned by the Kansas Department of Transportation (KDOT) in a July 30, 1958 meeting to become a state highway through Leoville as soon as Sheridan and Decatur counties had brought the roadway up to state highway standards. By June 1959, the required projects had been completed by the counties, and the highway was designated K-223 through a June 10, 1959 resolution. The alignment of K-223 has not changed since its creation. On April 1, 1981, K-223's northern terminus was renumbered from US-383 to K-383.

== Major intersections ==
| County | Location | mi | km | Destinations | Notes |
|---|---|---|---|---|---|
| Sheridan | Sheridan Township | 0.000 | 0.000 | K-23 – Selden, Hoxie | Southern terminus |
| Decatur | Dresden Township | 2.615 | 4.208 | K-383 | Northern terminus |
1.000 mi = 1.609 km; 1.000 km = 0.621 mi
