= Sheridan Township, Sheridan County, Kansas =

Township in Sheridan County, Kansas, U.S.

Sheridan Township
- Township
- Location within Sheridan County

- Location within Kansas
- Coordinates: 39°31′30″N 100°31′42″W
- Country: United States
- State: Kansas
- County: Sheridan

Area
  - Total: 53.484 sq mi (138.52 km^{2})
  - Land: 53.456 sq mi (138.45 km^{2})
  - Water: 0.028 sq mi (0.073 km^{2}) 0.05%
- Elevation: 2,815 ft (858 m)

Population (2020)
  - Total: 285
  - Density: 5.33/sq mi (2.06/km^{2})
- Time zone: UTC-6 (CST)
  - Summer (DST): UTC-5 (CDT)
- Area code: 785
- GNIS feature ID: 471106

Sheridan Township is a township in Sheridan County, Kansas, United States. As of the 2020 census, its population was 285.

== History ==
Sheridan Township is home to the ghost town of Sheridan. The extinct town of Arkona, whose post office was in operation from 1880 to 1881, is also located in the township.

== Geography ==
Sheridan Township covers an area of 53.484 square miles (138.52 square kilometers).

=== Communities ===
- Selden

=== Adjacent townships ===
Prairie Dog Township, Decatur County	northwest		northeast	Dresden Township, Decatur County
Prairie Dog Township, Sheridan County	west	self	east	Union Township, Sheridan County
Bloomfield Township, Sheridan County	southwest	south
Parnell Township, Sheridan County

== Transportation ==
=== Major highways ===
- US-83
- K-23
- K-123
- K-223
- K-383
