= Prairie Dog Township, Kansas =

Prairie Dog Township, Kansas may refer to one of the following townships:

- Prairie Dog Township, Decatur County, Kansas
- Prairie Dog Township, Sheridan County, Kansas

See also

- Prairie Dog Township (disambiguation)
