= Beaver Township, Kansas =

Beaver Township, Kansas may refer to the following places in Kansas:

- Beaver Township, Barton County, Kansas
- Beaver Township, Cowley County, Kansas
- Beaver Township, Decatur County, Kansas
- Beaver Township, Lincoln County, Kansas
- Beaver Township, Phillips County, Kansas
- Beaver Township, Republic County, Kansas
- Beaver Township, Scott County, Kansas
- Beaver Township, Smith County, Kansas

== See also ==
- List of Kansas townships
- Beaver Township (disambiguation)
