= K-383 (Kansas highway) =

State highway in Kansas, U.S.

K-383
- K-383 highlighted in red

Route information
- Maintained by KDOT
- Length: 74.042 mi (119.159 km)
- Existed: April 1, 1981–present

Major junctions
- South end: US-83 / K-23 near Selden
- US-36 near Norton; US-283 in Norton
- North end: US-183 near Woodruff

Location
- Country: United States
- State: Kansas
- Counties: Sheridan; Decatur; Norton; Phillips

Highway system
- Kansas State Highway System; Interstate; US; State; Spurs
← K-368	→ US-400

K-383 is a state highway in Kansas, United states. The highway runs 74.042 miles (119.159 km) from U.S. Route 83 (US-83) and K-23 near Selden north and east to US-183 near Woodruff, just south of the Nebraska state line. K-383 runs southwest–northeast and connects Norton with Colby to the southwest and Alma, Nebraska, to the northeast via the valley of Prairie Dog Creek, a tributary of the Republican River. The highway also serves the cities of Selden in northern Sheridan County; Dresden, Jennings, and Clayton in southeastern Decatur County; Almena in eastern Norton County; and Long Island in northern Phillips County. K-383 was assigned in 1981 over the portions of former US-383 that had not run concurrently with either US-83 or US-183. The highway was originally designated as parts of US-36 and K-22 in the mid-1920s. The entire route became US-83 and was placed on much of its modern alignment in the early 1930s, replacing the original path that followed section lines. The route was redesignated US-383 in the mid-1940s and paved from the late 1930s to the late 1940s. The highway was relocated within Norton in the late 1930s and early 1940s. Other relocations of K-383 have included the segment near Clayton in the mid-1950s, southwest of Norton in the late 1930s and again in the early 1960s, and at both ends of the highway in the early 1990s.

== Route description ==
K-383 begins at a four-legged intersection northeast of the town of Selden in northern Sheridan County. US-83 heads west toward Selden and Colby and north toward Oberlin; K-23 heads south and east toward Hoxie. K-383 heads northeast as a two-lane road immediately parallel to the Kyle Railroad and a couple of miles south of Prairie Dog Creek. The highway enters Decatur County and intersects K-223 north of the village of Leoville and K-123 while passing through the city of Dresden. K-383 and the railroad enter the creek valley shortly before the city of Jennings, through which the road is Railroad Street. The highway separates from the railroad for several miles prior to rejoining at the city of Clayton at the Decatur–Norton county line. K-383 leaves the railroad again southwest of the village of Oronoque, heading east then curving north to cross Prairie Dog Creek west of where the creek enters Keith Sebelius Lake. The highway crosses over the Kyle Railroad before intersecting US-36, with which the state highway runs concurrently east.

K-383 and US-36 intersect K-261, a spur serving Prairie Dog State Park, before reaching the city of Norton. The highways curve northeast and back east and pass through the northern part of the city as Holme Street. K-383 and US-36 intersect US-283 (State Street) north of the downtown area. The highways leave Norton and cross over the Kyle Railroad and begin to parallel the railroad and Prairie Dog Creek. K-383 and US-36 meet the southern end of K-67, a spur serving the Norton Correctional Facility, before they diverge. US-36 continues east and K-383 heads northeast parallel to the Kyle Railroad through the hamlet of Calvert. The state highway meets the northern end of K-60 just before it crosses over the Kyle Railroad on the edge of the city of Almena. K-383 continues east parallel to the Nebraska Kansas Colorado Railway into Phillips County. After the highway and railroad pass through the city of Long Island, that railroad splits to the north into Nebraska. K-383 passes through the village of Woodruff shortly before it reaches its northern terminus at US-183 about one half-mile south of the Nebraska state line.

The section of K-383 from its southern terminus to the northern end of the US-36 overlap is a part the National Highway System. The National Highway System is a system of highways important to the nation's defense, economy, and mobility.

== History ==
The portion of K-383 southwest of Almena was part of the Rock Island Highway, an auto trail that paralleled the Chicago, Rock Island and Pacific Railroad northeast from Colby to Norton and then east along the northern tier of the state to St. Joseph, Missouri. When the U.S. Highway System was laid out in 1926, the Rock Island Highway, which had become integrated into the Pikes Peak Ocean to Ocean Highway, was designated US-36. The portion of K-383 north of the US-36 split was K-22. By 1927, all of the highway along the K-383 corridor followed section lines, with a great number of right-angle turns, except for a small section south of Almena. US-36 and K-22 were graded throughout Norton County but were unimproved dirt roads in Decatur, Phillips, and Sheridan counties.

At their spring 1929 meeting, the American Association of State Highway Officials (AASHO, now AASHTO) approved changes to US-36 and US-83 in northwestern Kansas. Instead of heading southwest along the present K-383 corridor from Norton toward Selden, US-36 was extended west through Oberlin toward Colorado. US-83 was extended south from South Dakota and followed the whole length of the K-383 corridor. By 1932, the entire route from Selden to Nebraska had been straightened, mostly paralleling the railroad instead of following section lines, except for through Oronoque and Jennings. US-83 was a gravel road from Selden to the Norton–Phillips county line, east of which the highway remained a dirt road until it was graveled in 1937. The highway was relocated straight through Jennings and to a path with fewer turns through Oronoque in 1938; that same year, the highway was paved with a bituminous surface along the US-36 concurrency. US-83 was paved from the US-36 split to the Nebraska state line in 1940. The highway was paved from Selden to Dresden by 1945, and from Dresden to US-36 west of Norton in 1948. At their spring 1941 meeting, AASHO approved moving US-83 to its present corridor north of Selden, and US-383 was assigned to the entire length of the K-383 corridor and beyond in both directions.

The first modern relocations along what is now K-383 occurred in Norton. US-36 and US-83 originally entered the city along Washington Street, turned north onto First Avenue, and turned east onto Main Street. The highway followed Main Street out of town and along a road paralleling the railroad to the present highway. The first realignment was authorized in 1936, to eliminate several right-angle turns and several at-grade railroad crossings. East of the intersection of First and Main, US-36 and US-83 turned north onto State Street and followed the highway to Holme Street, where the highways joined the present course. By 1941 this change was deemed unsatisfactory due to the continued existence of right-angle turns and grade crossings. Shortly thereafter, the highways were moved to their present course bypassing downtown Norton. US-383 was relocated to K-383's present alignment southwest of Clayton starting in 1954. The highway was constructed along its current route near Oronoque concurrent with the construction of the Norton Reservoir (now Keith Sebelius Lake) on Prairie Dog Creek around 1962.

AASHTO approved the removal of the US-383 designation at their spring 1979 meeting. K-383 was assigned to the portions of former US-383 in Kansas from US-83 near Selden to a concurrency with US-183 at the Nebraska state line in 1981. In 1990, K-383's western terminus was relocated to its present spot. K-383 had begun at US-83's intersection with the first east–west section line road the latter highway intersects west of K-383. US-83 followed the section line road to near what was then K-23's northern terminus, then turned north along another section line road and passed under K-383 and the Kyle Railroad; a connector ramp was used between US-83 and K-383 at the bridges, which were constructed by 1951. US-83 was relocated to remove the grade separations and both K-383 and K-23 were given their present termini; the east–west section line road west of K-23 was transferred to county maintenance. In 1994, K-383 was relocated at its present eastern terminus to remove what had been a wye junction with US-183.

== Major intersections ==
County	Location	mi	km	Destinations	Notes
Sheridan		0.000	0.000	K-23 south / US-83 – Colby, Oberlin, Hoxie	Southern terminus of K-383; northern terminus of K-23; road continues as US-83 south (former US-383 south)
Decatur		4.531	7.292	K-223 south – Leoville	Northern terminus of K-223
Decatur	Dresden	7.361	11.846	K-123 south to K-9 east – Hoxie	Northern terminus of K-123
Norton		36.374	58.538	US-36 west – Oberlin	Southern end of concurrency with US-36
Norton		38.376	61.760	K-261 south – Prairie Dog State Park	Northern terminus of K-261
Norton	Norton	42.636	68.616	US-283 (State Street) – Hill City, Arapahoe Neb.	
Norton		46.575	74.955	K-67 north – Norton Correctional Facility	Southern terminus of K-67
Norton		48.339	77.794	US-36 east – Phillipsburg	Northern end of concurrency with US-36
Norton	Almena	53.512	86.119	K-60 south	Northern terminus of K-60
Phillips		74.042	119.159	US-183 – Phillipsburg, Alma Neb.	Northern terminus; US-183 north is former US-383 north
1.000 mi = 1.609 km; 1.000 km = 0.621 mi: Concurrency terminus

== See also ==
- List of state highways in Kansas
- List of highways numbered 383
