= Lund, Kansas =

Ghost town in Decatur County, Kansas

- Ghost town
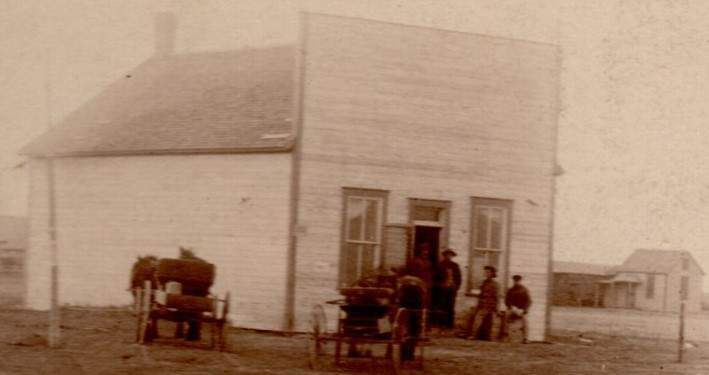
- Lund Store (1910)

- Location within Kansas Location within the United States
- Coordinates: 39°40′11″N 100°36′35″W
- Country: United States
- State: Kansas
- County: Decatur
- Township: Summit
- Elevation: 2,808 ft (856 m)

Population
  - Total: 0
- Time zone: UTC-6 (CST)
  - Summer (DST): UTC-5 (CDT)
- Area code: 785
- GNIS ID: 481934

Lund is a ghost town in Summit Township of Decatur County, Kansas, United States. It was located 12 miles south and four miles west of Oberlin.

== History ==
Lund was issued a post office in 1892. The post office was discontinued in 1907 when it was moved to Dresden (10 miles southeast of Lund). Lund was not named on the 1910 census but was part of Summit Township, population 24.

A church and cemetery are all that remains of this former community.

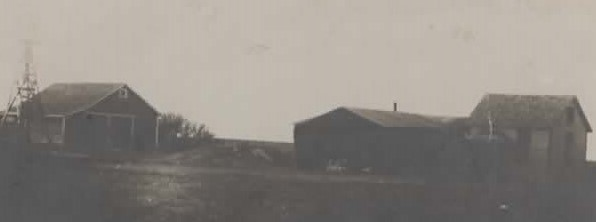
Frank and Pearl (Hill) Bacon home in Lund, 1908–1910
