= Sheffield, Kansas =

- Ghost town
- Location within Kansas Location within the United States
- Coordinates: 39°45′05″N 100°41′12″W
- Country: United States
- State: Kansas
- County: Decatur
- Elevation: 2,667 ft (813 m)

Population
  - Total: 0
- Time zone: UTC-6 (CST)
  - Summer (DST): UTC-5 (CDT)
- Area code: 785
- GNIS ID: 482125

Sheffield is a ghost town in Sappa Township of Decatur County, Kansas, United States.

== History ==
Sheffield was issued a post office in 1881. The post office was discontinued in 1887.
