= Shibboleth, Kansas =

- Ghost town
- Location within Kansas Location within the United States
- Coordinates: 39°38′02″N 100°31′17″W
- Country: United States
- State: Kansas
- County: Decatur
- Elevation: 2,677 ft (816 m)

Population
  - Total: 0
- Time zone: UTC-6 (CST)
  - Summer (DST): UTC-5 (CDT)
- Area code: 785
- GNIS ID: 481999

Shibboleth is a former post village in Decatur County, Kansas, United States. Shibboleth Cemetery is located in the eastern part of the present-day Prairie Dog Township.

== History ==
Shibboleth was issued a post office in 1875. The post office was discontinued at the end of 1904.
