= Harlan Township =

Harlan Township may refer to the following townships in the United States:

- Harlan Township, Fayette County, Iowa
- Harlan Township, Decatur County, Kansas
- Harlan Township, Warren County, Ohio
