= Harlan Township, Kansas =

Harlan Township, Kansas may refer to:

- Harlan Township, Decatur County, Kansas
- Harlan Township, Smith County, Kansas
