= Stephen, Kansas =

- Ghost town
- Location within Kansas Location within the United States
- Coordinates: 39°41′51″N 100°30′32″W
- Country: United States
- State: Kansas
- County: Decatur
- Elevation: 2,759 ft (841 m)

Population
  - Total: 0
- Time zone: UTC-6 (CST)
  - Summer (DST): UTC-5 (CDT)
- Area code: 785
- GNIS ID: 482127

Stephen is a ghost town in Custer Township of Decatur County, Kansas, United States.

== History ==
Stephen was issued a post office in 1883. The post office was discontinued in 1888.
