= Hooker, Kansas =

- Ghost town
- Location within Kansas Location within the United States
- Coordinates: 39°45′05″N 100°35′27″W
- Country: United States
- State: Kansas
- County: Decatur
- Elevation: 2,625 ft (800 m)

Population
  - Total: 0
- Time zone: UTC-6 (CST)
  - Summer (DST): UTC-5 (CDT)
- Area code: 785
- GNIS ID: 482126

Hooker is a ghost town in Oberlin Township of Decatur County, Kansas, United States.

== History ==
Hooker was issued a post office in 1880. The post office was renamed Saint John in 1907.
