= Oberlin High School =

Oberlin High School may refer to:

- Oberlin High School (Louisiana), Oberlin, Louisiana, United States
- Oberlin High School (Ohio), Oberlin, Ohio, United States
- Oberlin High School, Jamaica
