= Bank of Oberlin =

- U.S. National Register of Historic Places
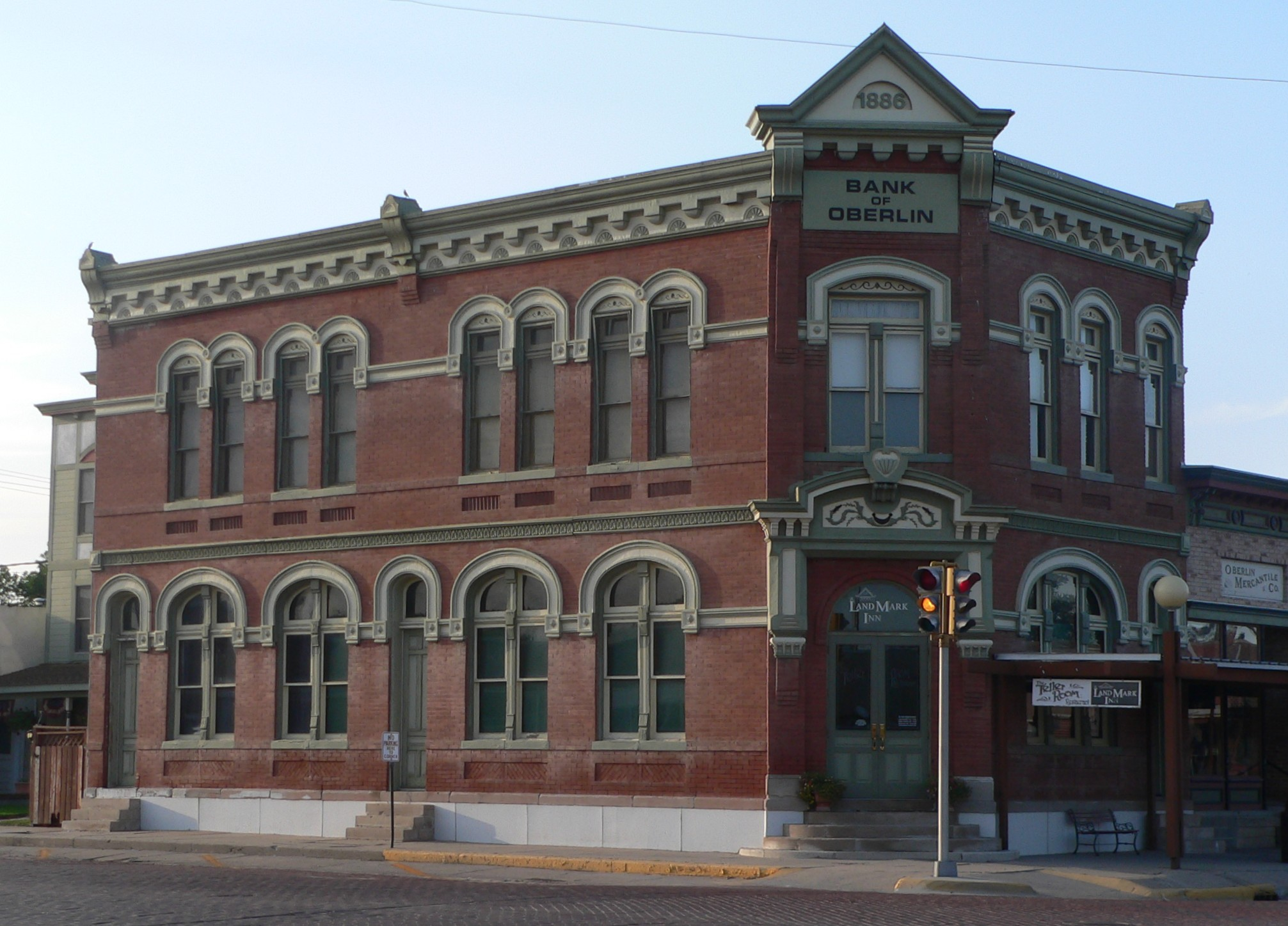

- Location within Kansas Location within the United States
- Location: 187 S. Penn, Oberlin, Kansas
- Coordinates: 39°49′8.9″N 100°31′45.6″W
- Built: 1886; 140 years ago
- Built by: White, Mr.
- Architectural style: Italianate
- NRHP reference No.: 94001418
- Added to NRHP: December 1, 1994

The Bank of Oberlin, located at 187 S. Penn in Oberlin, Kansas, United States, was a bank whose building was constructed in 1886. The building, also known as the Decatur County Courthouse and as First National Bank of Oberlin, was listed on the National Register of Historic Places since 1994.

It is a 28-by-60-foot (8.5 m × 18.3 m) two-story red brick building. The brick walls include corbelling and a herringbone panel beneath each window and are "beautiful", in contrast to the walls of many historic buildings in Oberlin that have been covered with stucco or siding.

The Bank of Oberlin occupied the building until 1894, when it closed due to the Panic of 1893. Decatur County acquired the building as part of a settlement following the bank's failure, and it used the building as its first permanent courthouse until 1927.

It was deemed significant "for its historical association with the growth and development of Oberlin" and "for its architectural significance as an Italianate commercial building."
