= K123 =

K123 or K-123 may refer to:

- K-123 (Kansas highway), a state highway in Kansas
- HMS Oxlip (K123), a former UK Royal Navy ship
