= Tasco, Kansas =

Unincorporated community in Sheridan County, Kansas

- Unincorporated community
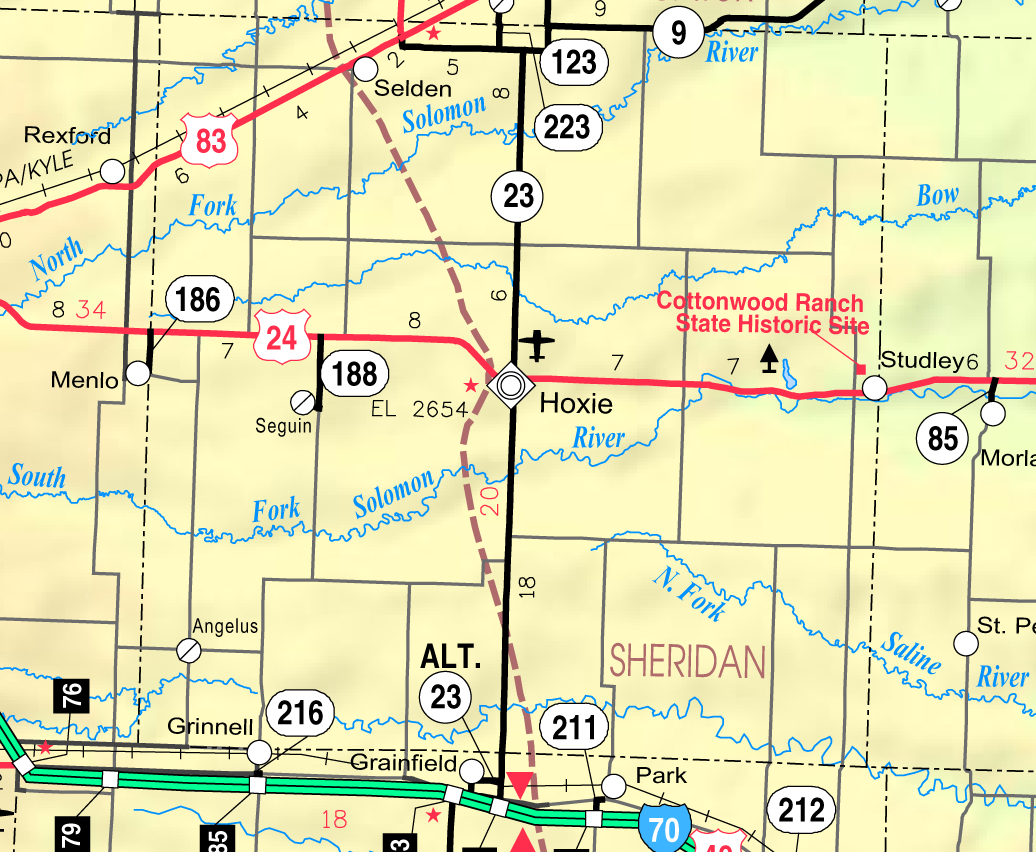
- KDOT map of Sheridan County (legend)

- Location within Kansas Location within the United States
- Coordinates: 39°21′8″N 100°18′10″W
- Country: United States
- State: Kansas
- County: Sheridan
- Elevation: 2,500 ft (760 m)
- Time zone: UTC-6 (CST)
  - Summer (DST): UTC-5 (CDT)
- Area code: 785
- FIPS code: 20-70025
- GNIS ID: 471276

Tasco is an unincorporated community in Sheridan County, Kansas, United States. It is located approximately seven miles east of Hoxie and south of U.S. Route 24, adjacent to an abandoned railroad.

== History ==
Originally named Guy, the community was issued a post office in 1887. The post office was renamed Tasco in 1923, then discontinued in 1953.

== Education ==
The community is served by Hoxie USD 412 public school district.
