= Decatur, Kansas =

- Ghost town
- Location within Kansas Location within the United States
- Coordinates: 39°54′30″N 100°22′00″W
- Country: United States
- State: Kansas
- County: Decatur
- Elevation: 2,480 ft (760 m)

Population
  - Total: 0
- Time zone: UTC-6 (CST)
  - Summer (DST): UTC-5 (CDT)
- Area code: 785
- GNIS ID: 482124

Decatur is a ghost town in Roosevelt Township of Decatur County, Kansas, United States.

== History ==
Decatur was issued a post office in 1874. The post office was discontinued in 1897.
