= Liberty Township, Decatur County, Kansas =

Liberty Township
- Township
- Interactive map of Liberty Township
- Coordinates: 39°53′54″N 100°34′07″W
- Country: United States
- State: Kansas
- County: Decatur

Area
  - Total: 35.20 sq mi (91.17 km^{2})
  - Land: 35.19 sq mi (91.15 km^{2})
  - Water: 0.0077 sq mi (0.02 km^{2}) 0.02%
- Elevation: 2,802 ft (854 m)

Population (2020)
  - Total: 41
  - Density: 1.2/sq mi (0.45/km^{2})
- GNIS feature ID: 0470919

Liberty Township is a township in Decatur County, Kansas, United States. As of the 2020 census, its population was 41.

== Geography ==
Liberty Township covers an area of 35.2 square miles (91 km^{2}) and contains no incorporated settlements. The county seat of Oberlin sits on the township's southeastern border.

== Transportation ==
Liberty Township contains two airports or landing strips: Oberlin Municipal Airport and R and D Aerial Spraying Airport.
