= Prairie Dog Township =

Prairie Dog Township may refer to one of the following places in the United States:

- Prairie Dog Township, Decatur County, Kansas
- Prairie Dog Township, Sheridan County, Kansas
- Prairie Dog Township, Harlan County, Nebraska

See also

- Prairie Township (disambiguation)
- Prairie Creek Township (disambiguation)
