= Summit Township, Decatur County, Kansas =

Summit Township
- Township
- Location in Decatur County
- Coordinates: 39°41′48″N 100°34′47″W
- Country: United States
- State: Kansas
- County: Decatur

Area
  - Total: 35.86 sq mi (92.88 km^{2})
  - Land: 35.8 sq mi (92.8 km^{2})
  - Water: 0.031 sq mi (0.08 km^{2}) 0.09%
- Elevation: 2,815 ft (858 m)

Population (2020)
  - Total: 20
  - Density: 0.56/sq mi (0.22/km^{2})
- GNIS feature ID: 0471063

Summit Township is a township in Decatur County, Kansas, United States. As of the 2020 census, its population was 20.

== Geography ==
Summit Township covers an area of 35.86 square miles (92.9 km^{2}) and contains the ghost town of Lund. According to the USGS, it contains one cemetery, Mennonite.
