= Prairie Dog Township, Sheridan County, Kansas =

Township in Sheridan County, Kansas, U.S.

Prairie Dog Township
- Township
- Location within Sheridan County

- Location within Kansas
- Coordinates: 39°31′30″N 100°39′52″W
- Country: United States
- State: Kansas
- County: Sheridan

Area
  - Total: 35.85 sq mi (92.9 km^{2})
  - Land: 35.838 sq mi (92.82 km^{2})
  - Water: 0.012 sq mi (0.031 km^{2}) 0.03%
- Elevation: 2,897 ft (883 m)

Population (2020)
  - Total: 33
  - Density: 0.92/sq mi (0.36/km^{2})
- Time zone: UTC-6 (CST)
  - Summer (DST): UTC-5 (CDT)
- Area code: 785
- GNIS feature ID: 471104

Prairie Dog Township is a township in Sheridan County, Kansas, United States. As of the 2020 census, its population was 33.

== Geography ==
Prairie Dog Township covers an area of 35.85 square miles (92.9 square kilometers).

=== Adjacent townships ===
Cook Township, Decatur County
		north	northeast	Prairie Dog Township, Decatur County
Wendell Township, Thomas County	west	self	east	Sheridan Township, Sheridan County
Smith Township, Thomas County	southwest	south	southeast	Parnell Township, Sheridan County
Bloomfield Township, Sheridan County

== Transportation ==
=== Major highways ===
- US-83
