= Olive Township, Kansas =

Olive Township
- Township
- Location in Decatur County
- Coordinates: 39°51′22″N 100°27′39″W
- Country: United States
- State: Kansas
- County: Decatur

Area
  - Total: 35.66 sq mi (92.36 km^{2})
  - Land: 35.43 sq mi (91.76 km^{2})
  - Water: 0.23 sq mi (0.6 km^{2}) 0.65%
- Elevation: 2,543 ft (775 m)

Population (2020)
  - Total: 53
  - Density: 1.5/sq mi (0.58/km^{2})
- GNIS ID: 0470925

Olive Township is a township in Decatur County, Kansas, United States. As of the 2020 census, its population was 53.

== History ==
A post office was opened at Vallonia in 1879. The post office was discontinued in 1887.

== Geography ==
Olive Township covers an area of 35.66 square miles (92.4 km^{2}) and contains no incorporated settlements. According to the USGS, it contains one cemetery, Vallonia.

The streams of Cotton Creek and Johnson Draw run through this township.
