= Logan Township, Decatur County, Kansas =

Logan Township
- Township
- Location in Decatur County
- Coordinates: 39°53′38″N 100°41′07″W
- Country: United States
- State: Kansas
- County: Decatur

Area
  - Total: 35.76 sq mi (92.63 km^{2})
  - Land: 35.76 sq mi (92.63 km^{2})
  - Water: 0 sq mi (0 km^{2}) 0%
- Elevation: 2,790 ft (850 m)

Population (2020)
  - Total: 39
  - Density: 1.1/sq mi (0.42/km^{2})
- GNIS feature ID: 0470920

Logan Township is a township in Decatur County, Kansas, United States. As of the 2020 census, its population was 39.

== Geography ==
Logan Township covers an area of 35.77 square miles (92.6 km^{2}) and contains no incorporated settlements. According to the USGS, it contains two cemeteries: Saint Johns and Saint Johns.
