= Altory Township, Kansas =

Township in Kansas, United States

Altory Township
- Township
- Location in Decatur County
- Coordinates: 39°46′54″N 100°20′27″W
- Country: United States
- State: Kansas
- County: Decatur

Area
  - Total: 35.75 sq mi (92.59 km^{2})
  - Land: 35.75 sq mi (92.59 km^{2})
  - Water: 0 sq mi (0 km^{2}) 0%
- Elevation: 2,618 ft (798 m)

Population (2020)
  - Total: 16
  - Density: 0.52/sq mi (0.2/km^{2})
- GNIS feature ID: 0471017

Altory Township is a township in Decatur County, Kansas, United States. As of the 2020 census, its population was 16.

== Geography ==
Altory Township covers an area of 35.75 square miles (92.6 km^{2}) and contains no incorporated settlements. According to the USGS, it contains two cemeteries: Big Timber and Kanona.
