= Finley Township, Kansas =

Finley Township
- Township
- Location in Decatur County
- Coordinates: 39°57′40″N 100°41′17″W
- Country: United States
- State: Kansas
- County: Decatur

Area
  - Total: 35.75 sq mi (92.58 km^{2})
  - Land: 35.75 sq mi (92.58 km^{2})
  - Water: 0 sq mi (0 km^{2}) 0%
- Elevation: 2,759 ft (841 m)

Population (2020)
  - Total: 43
  - Density: 1.2/sq mi (0.46/km^{2})
- GNIS feature ID: 0470917

Finley Township is a township in Decatur County, Kansas, United States. As of the 2020 census, its population was 43.

== Geography ==
Finley Township covers an area of 35.74 square miles (92.6 km^{2}) and contains no incorporated settlements. According to the USGS, it contains one cemetery, Traer.
