= Hoxie USD 412 =

Public school district in Hoxie, Kansas

Address
- 1100 Queen Ave. Hoxie, Kansas, 67740; United States
- Coordinates: 39°21′20″N 100°26′24″W

District information
- Type: Public
- Grades: K to 12
- Schools: 2

Other information
- Website: hoxie.org

Hoxie USD 412 is a public unified school district headquartered in Hoxie, Kansas, United States. The district includes the communities of Hoxie, Jennings (south of highway 383), Leoville, Seguin, Studley, Tasco, Allison, Dresden (south of highway 383), rural areas southwest of the Clayton (south of highway 383), and other nearby rural areas.

== Schools ==
The school district operates the following schools:

- Hoxie Junior-Senior High School
- Hoxie Elementary School

== History ==
In 2006, Prairie Heights USD 295 underwent a dissolution, a majority of students moved to Hoxie USD 412, the rest to Oberlin USD 294.

== See also ==
- Kansas State Department of Education
- Kansas State High School Activities Association
- List of high schools in Kansas
- List of unified school districts in Kansas
