= Jennings Township, Kansas =

Jennings Township
- Township
- Location in Decatur County
- Coordinates: 39°41′58″N 100°20′07″W
- Country: United States
- State: Kansas
- County: Decatur

Area
  - Total: 35.88 sq mi (92.94 km^{2})
  - Land: 35.76 sq mi (92.63 km^{2})
  - Water: 0.12 sq mi (0.31 km^{2}) 0.33%
- Elevation: 2,621 ft (799 m)

Population (2020)
  - Total: 109
  - Density: 3.05/sq mi (1.18/km^{2})
- GNIS feature ID: 0471075

Jennings Township is a township in Decatur County, Kansas, United States. As of the 2020 census, its population was 109.

== Geography ==
Jennings Township covers an area of 35.89 square miles (93.0 km^{2}) and contains one incorporated settlement, Jennings. According to the USGS, it contains two cemeteries: Jackson and Jennings.
