= Allison, Kansas =

Unincorporated community in Decatur County, Kansas

Coordinates: 39°34′30″N 100°15′51″W

Allison is an unincorporated community in Decatur County, Kansas, United States.

== History ==
A post office was opened in Allison in 1880, and remained in operation until it was discontinued in 1919.

== Education ==
The community is served by Hoxie USD 412 public school district.
