= Lyon Township, Decatur County, Kansas =

Lyon Township
- Township
- Location in Decatur County
- Coordinates: 39°36′00″N 100°20′32″W
- Country: United States
- State: Kansas
- County: Decatur

Area
  - Total: 35.88 sq mi (92.93 km^{2})
  - Land: 35.88 sq mi (92.93 km^{2})
  - Water: 0 sq mi (0 km^{2}) 0%
- Elevation: 2,667 ft (813 m)

Population (2020)
  - Total: 19
  - Density: 0.53/sq mi (0.20/km^{2})
- GNIS feature ID: 0471074

Lyon Township is a township in Decatur County, Kansas, United States. As of the 2020 census, its population was 19.

== Geography ==
Lyon Township covers an area of 35.88 square miles (92.9 km^{2}) and contains no incorporated settlements.
