= Pleasant Valley Township, Decatur County, Kansas =

Pleasant Valley Township
- Township
- Location in Decatur County
- Coordinates: 39°42′00″N 100°13′01″W
- Country: United States
- State: Kansas
- County: Decatur

Area
  - Total: 35.79 sq mi (92.69 km^{2})
  - Land: 35.77 sq mi (92.65 km^{2})
  - Water: 0.019 sq mi (0.05 km^{2}) 0.05%
- Elevation: 2,460 ft (750 m)

Population (2020)
  - Total: 27
  - Density: 0.75/sq mi (0.29/km^{2})
- GNIS feature ID: 0471078

Pleasant Valley Township is a township in Decatur County, Kansas, United States. As of the 2020 census, its population was 27.

== Geography ==
Pleasant Valley Township covers an area of 35.79 square miles (92.7 km^{2}) and contains no incorporated settlements.

The stream of Big Timber Creek runs through this township.
