= Oberlin, Licking County, Ohio =

Ghost town in Ohio, United States

Coordinates: 40.229°N 82.335°W

Oberlin is a ghost town in Eden Township, Licking County, in the U.S. state of Ohio.

== History ==
Oberlin was founded about 1856 and at first was centered on a general store.
