= Grant Township, Decatur County, Kansas =

Grant Township
- Township
- Location in Decatur County
- Coordinates: 39°58′03″N 100°13′12″W
- Country: United States
- State: Kansas
- County: Decatur

Area
  - Total: 35.62 sq mi (92.25 km^{2})
  - Land: 35.59 sq mi (92.19 km^{2})
  - Water: 0.027 sq mi (0.07 km^{2}) 0.08%
- Elevation: 2,372 ft (723 m)

Population (2020)
  - Total: 17
  - Density: 0.48/sq mi (0.18/km^{2})
- GNIS feature ID: 0470936

Grant Township is a township in Decatur County, Kansas, United States. As of the 2020 census, its population was 17.

== Geography ==
Grant Township covers an area of 35.62 square miles (92.3 km^{2}) and contains no incorporated settlements.

The stream of Spring Branch runs through this township.
