= Roosevelt Township, Kansas =

Roosevelt Township
- Township
- Location in Decatur County
- Coordinates: 39°51′22″N 100°20′22″W
- Country: United States
- State: Kansas
- County: Decatur

Area
  - Total: 36.02 sq mi (93.29 km^{2})
  - Land: 35.99 sq mi (93.22 km^{2})
  - Water: 0.023 sq mi (0.06 km^{2}) 0.06%
- Elevation: 2,638 ft (804 m)

Population (2020)
  - Total: 7
  - Density: 0.19/sq mi (0.075/km^{2})
- GNIS feature ID: 0470930

Roosevelt Township is a township in Decatur County, Kansas, United States. As of the 2020 census, its population was 7.

== Geography ==
Roosevelt Township covers an area of 36.02 square miles (93.3 km^{2}) and contains no incorporated settlements.
