= U.S. Route 36 in Kansas =

East-west highway

U.S. Highway 36
- US-36 highlighted in red

Route information
- Maintained by KDOT
- Length: 390 mi (630 km)
- Existed: 1926–present

Major junctions
- West end: US 36 at the Colorado state line near St. Francis
- US-83 in Oberlin; US-283 in Norton; US-183 in Phillipsburg; US-281 in Smith Center; US-81 in Belleville; US-77 in Marysville; US-75 near Fairview; US-73 / US-159 in Hiawatha
- East end: US 36 at the Missouri state line in Elwood

Location
- Country: United States
- State: Kansas
- Counties: Cheyenne, Rawlins, Decatur, Norton, Phillips, Smith, Jewell, Republic, Washington, Marshall, Nemaha, Brown, Doniphan

Highway system
- United States Numbered Highway System; List; Special; Divided; Kansas State Highway System; Interstate; US; State; Spurs
← I-35	→ K-39

U.S. Route 36 (US-36) is a major east–west route in the U.S. state of Kansas, extending from the Colorado state line to the Missouri border.

== Route description ==
The highway enters from Colorado into Cheyenne County, and shares a seven-mile (11 km) concurrency through the town of St. Francis with K-27, the first north–south route intersected in Kansas. K-27 splits east of St. Francis and heads south toward Goodland, and US-36 then continues through Bird City and McDonald before intersecting K-25 in Atwood, the seat of Rawlins County.

US-36 continues east through Decatur County, intersecting with US-83 in Oberlin before beginning a concurrency with K-383 in Norton County, a concurrency which runs for 12 miles (19 km) through the city of Norton, where it crosses US-283. K-383 splits in eastern Norton County and bends northeast toward Almena and the Nebraska state line, while US-36 enters Phillips County, picking up a brief concurrency with US-183 in Phillipsburg.

The highway passes through the small towns of Agra and Kensington before reaching Smith Center, the seat of Smith County, where US-281 joins US-36 for a 12-mile (19 km) concurrency. Near Lebanon, US-36 passes about four miles (6.4 km) south of the Geographic center of the contiguous United States, which is indicated by a marker where US-281 splits northward to Lebanon. US-36 then passes through largely unpopulated areas, except for the tiny town of Mankato in Jewell County.

At Belleville, the seat of Republic County, US-36 has an interchange with US-81. After passing through Washington County, US-36 picks up a brief concurrency with US-77 in Marysville, the seat of Marshall County, and another one with US-75 in Fairview. Between the junctions with US-77 and US-75, the highway passes through Nemaha County and its seat, Seneca.

In Brown County, US-36 becomes a super two, intersecting the concurrency of US-73 and US-159 in Hiawatha. The highway becomes full-access again before entering Doniphan County for its final trek through the state, passing through Troy and into Wathena, where it picks up freeway status though Elwood before crossing the Missouri River on the Pony Express Bridges and entering Missouri.

== History ==
Prior to 1926, the portion of future US-36 between Norton and the Missouri state line was known as the Rock Island Highway. The US-36 designation first appeared on Kansas maps in 1932. Since then, the highway has been straightened and parts of it upgraded to freeway or super two status.

Originally US-36 overlapped K-63 for a mile north out of Seneca, then turned east and left K-63 towards Oneida. Then in a March 21, 1939 resolution, it was approved to realign US-36 between Seneca and Fairview on a straight alignment, eliminating the overlap with K-63.

== Major junctions ==
All exits are unnumbered.

County	Location	mi	km	Destinations	Notes
Cheyenne		0.000	0.000	US 36 west – Denver	Continuation into Colorado
Cheyenne				K-27 north – Haigler Ne.	West end of K-27 concurrency
Cheyenne				K-27 south – Goodland	East end of K-27 concurrency
Cheyenne	Bird City			K-161 north – Benkelman Ne.	
Rawlins	Atwood			K-25 – Trenton Ne., Colby	
Rawlins	Midway			K-117 north – Herndon	
Decatur	Oberlin			US-83 – McCook Ne., Hoxie, Oakley	Former US-183
Norton				K-383 south – Clayton	West end of K-383 concurrency; former US-383 south; originally US-83 south
Norton	Norton			US-283 (State Street) – Arapahoe Ne., Hill City, Business District	Former K-21
Norton				K-67 north – Norton Correctional Facility	
Norton				K-383 north – Almena	East end of K-383 concurrency; former US-383 north; originally US-83 north
Norton				K-60 north (Road E11) – Almena	
Phillips	Phillipsburg			US-183 north (Second Street) – Alma Neb.	West end of US-183 concurrency; former K-1 north
Phillips	Phillipsburg			US-183 south – Stockton	East end of US-183 concurrency; former K-1 south
Smith	Kensington			K-248 south (Main Street) – Business District	
Smith				K-8 north (H Road) – Franklin Ne.	
Smith				K-204 east – Smith Center	
Smith	Smith Center			US-281 south (Main Street) – Osborne, Business District	West end of US-281 concurrency; former K-8 south
Smith				K-182 north (V Road) – Bellaire	
Smith				US-281 north / K-181 south – Lebanon, Downs	Interchange; east end of US-281 concurrency; northern terminus of K-181; US-281 north is former K-65
Jewell				K-112 north (50 Road) – Esbon	
Jewell				K-128 south – Waconda Lake	West end of K-128 concurrency
Jewell				K-128 north (110 Road) – Burr Oak	East end of K-128 concurrency; former K-28 west
Jewell				K-14 south – Jewell, Beloit	West end of K-14 concurrency
Jewell				K-14 north – Superior Ne.	East end of K-128 concurrency
Republic				K-199 south – Courtland	
Republic				K-266 (50 Road) – Pawnee Indian Village	
Republic	Belleville			US-81 – Concordia, Hebron Ne.	Interchange
Republic				K-139 south – Cuba	
Washington				K-22 north (Deer Road) – Haddam	
Washington				K-15 north – Morrowville, Fairbury Neb.	West end of K-15 concurrency; former K-15W north
Washington	Washington			K-15 south (B Street) – Clay Center	East end of K-15 concurrency; former K-15W south
Washington				K-148 (All-American Road) / Oregon National Historic Trail / California National Historic Trail / Pony Express National Historic Trail – Hanover, Nebraska state line, Barnes	Former K-15E
Marshall	Marysville			US-77 north – Beatrice Ne.	West end of US-77 concurrency
Marshall	Marysville			US-77 south (Tenth Street) / Oregon National Historic Trail / California National Historic Trail – Junction City, Blue Rapids	East end of US-77 concurrency
Marshall				K-99 (21st Terrace) – Beattie, Frankfort	
Marshall				K-87 south (26th Road) – Vliets	
Marshall				K-110 north (30th Road) – Axtell	
Nemaha				K-187 south – Centralia	
Nemaha				K-178 north – St. Benedict	
Nemaha	Seneca			K-63 north (21st Terrace) – Beattie, Frankfort	West end of K-63 concurrency
Nemaha				K-63 south (26th Road) – Vliets	East end of K-63 concurrency
Nemaha				K-236 north – Oneida	
Brown				US-75 – Sabetha, Holton	Interchange
Brown				12th Street	West end of super two
Brown	Hiawatha			US-73 / US-159 – Hiawatha, Horton	
Brown				Mulberry Road	
Brown				Raccoon Road	
Brown				Timber Road	
Doniphan				Ash Point Road – Leona	At-grade intersection; east end of super two
Doniphan				K-120 – Highland, Severance	Interchange
Doniphan				K-7 – Atchison, White Cloud	Interchange
Doniphan				K-136 – Troy	Interchange; northern terminus of K-136
Doniphan	Wathena–Elwood line			165th Road	West end of freeway
Doniphan	Elwood			K-238	Southern terminus of K-238
Doniphan	Elwood			Roseport Road	
Missouri River		390.0	627.6	Pony Express Bridges; Kansas–Missouri line	
Missouri River		390.0	627.6	US 36 east	Continuation into St. Joseph, Missouri
1.000 mi = 1.609 km; 1.000 km = 0.621 mi: Concurrency terminus; Route transition

U.S. Route 36
Previous state: Colorado	Kansas	Next state: Missouri
