= Oberlin (surname) =

Oberlin is the surname of:

- Adam W. Oberlin (1859–1921), American politician from Ohio
- Frank Oberlin (1876–1952), American Major League Baseball pitcher
- J. F. Oberlin (1740–1826), Alsatian pastor and philanthropist
- Jérémie Jacques Oberlin (1735–1806), Alsatian philologist and archaeologist, brother of the above
- Russell Oberlin (1928–2016), American opera singer
- Rachel Oberlin (born 1986), American former pornographic actress
