= Custer Township, Decatur County, Kansas =

Custer Township
- Township
- Location in Decatur County
- Coordinates: 39°41′44″N 100°27′27″W
- Country: United States
- State: Kansas
- County: Decatur

Area
  - Total: 35.78 sq mi (92.67 km^{2})
  - Land: 35.76 sq mi (92.63 km^{2})
  - Water: 0.012 sq mi (0.03 km^{2}) 0.03%
- Elevation: 2,664 ft (812 m)

Population (2020)
  - Total: 48
  - Density: 1.3/sq mi (0.52/km^{2})
- GNIS feature ID: 0471070

Custer Township is a township in Decatur County, Kansas, United States. As of the 2020 census, its population was 48.

== Geography ==
Custer Township covers an area of 35.78 square miles (92.7 km^{2}) and contains no incorporated settlements.
