= Allison Township, Kansas =

Allison Township
- Township
- Location in Decatur County
- Coordinates: 39°36′00″N 100°13′11″W
- Country: United States
- State: Kansas
- County: Decatur

Area
  - Total: 35.83 sq mi (92.79 km^{2})
  - Land: 35.82 sq mi (92.78 km^{2})
  - Water: 0.0039 sq mi (0.01 km^{2}) 0.01%
- Elevation: 2,539 ft (774 m)

Population (2020)
  - Total: 49
  - Density: 1.4/sq mi (0.53/km^{2})
- GNIS feature ID: 0471079

Allison Township is a township in Decatur County, Kansas, United States. As of the 2020 census, its population was 49.

== Geography ==
Allison Township covers an area of 35.83 square miles (92.8 km^{2}) and contains no incorporated settlements.
