= Sappa Township, Kansas =

Sappa Township
- Township
- Location in Decatur County
- Coordinates: 39°47′00″N 100°41′07″W
- Country: United States
- State: Kansas
- County: Decatur

Area
  - Total: 36.00 sq mi (93.25 km^{2})
  - Land: 35.99 sq mi (93.21 km^{2})
  - Water: 0.015 sq mi (0.04 km^{2}) 0.04%
- Elevation: 2,743 ft (836 m)

Population (2020)
  - Total: 17
  - Density: 0.47/sq mi (0.18/km^{2})
- GNIS feature ID: 0471007

Sappa Township is a township in Decatur County, Kansas, United States. As of the 2020 census, its population was 17.

== Geography ==
Sappa Township covers an area of 36 square miles (93 km^{2}) and contains no incorporated settlements.
