= Beaver Township, Decatur County, Kansas =

Beaver Township
- Township
- Location in Decatur County
- Coordinates: 39°57′20″N 100°34′02″W
- Country: United States
- State: Kansas
- County: Decatur

Area
  - Total: 35.74 sq mi (92.57 km^{2})
  - Land: 35.70 sq mi (92.46 km^{2})
  - Water: 0.039 sq mi (0.1 km^{2}) 0.11%
- Elevation: 2,700 ft (823 m)

Population (2020)
  - Total: 69
  - Density: 1.9/sq mi (0.75/km^{2})
- GNIS feature ID: 0470918

Beaver Township is a township in Decatur County, Kansas, United States. As of the 2020 census, its population was 69.

== Geography ==
Beaver Township covers an area of 35.74 square miles (92.6 km^{2}) and contains no incorporated settlements. According to the USGS, it contains one cemetery, Cedar Bluffs.
