= U.S. Route 283 in Kansas =

Segment of American highway

U.S. Highway 283
- US-283 highlighted in red

Route information
- Maintained by KDOT and the city of Jetmore
- Length: 217.004 mi (349.234 km)
- Existed: 1933–present

Major junctions
- South end: US 283 at the Oklahoma state line in Englewood
- US-160 south of Minneola; US-54 in Minneola; US-50 / US-56 / US-400 in Dodge City; K-156 in Jetmore; K-96 in Ness City; K-4 east of Ransom; I-70 / US-40 in WaKeeney; US-24 in Hill City; K-9 west of Edmond; US-36 / K-383 in Norton
- North end: US 283 at the Nebraska state line near Beaver City, NE

Location
- Country: United States
- State: Kansas
- Counties: Clark, Ford, Hodgeman, Ness, Trego, Graham, Norton

Highway system
- United States Numbered Highway System; List; Special; Divided; Kansas State Highway System; Interstate; US; State; Spurs
← US-281	→ K-284
← K-20	→ K-22

U.S. Route 283 (US-283) is a part of the U.S. Highway System that runs from US-87 in Brady, Texas north to US-30 in Lexington, Nebraska. In the U.S. state of Kansas, US-283 is a main north–south highway that runs from the Oklahoma border north to the Nebraska border in the western part of the state. Along the way it intersects other major routes including US-50, US-56 and US-400 in Dodge City, Interstate 70 (I-70) and US-40 in WaKeeney. It also intersects US-36 and K-383 in Norton.

In 1927, the highway that would become US-283 was established as K-21 from the Oklahoma border north to the Nebraska border. In 1933, US-283 was extended north from Oklahoma over K-21 to US-50S and US-154 in Dodge City. By 1936, it had been extended further north to K-96 in Ness City, further along K-21. Between 1938 and 1940, US-283 was extended north to US-36, US-83 and US-183 in Norton. Between 1941 and 1945, US-283 was extended north into Nebraska, resulting in K-21 being completely decommissioned.

== Route description ==
US-283 enters from Oklahoma south of Englewood in Clark County, and passes through largely unpopulated areas of the county until joining up for a brief concurrency with U.S. Route 160. Following the split, US-283 continues north through Minneola before making its way into Dodge City, the only town with a population of more than 3,300 the highway passes through in the Sunflower State.

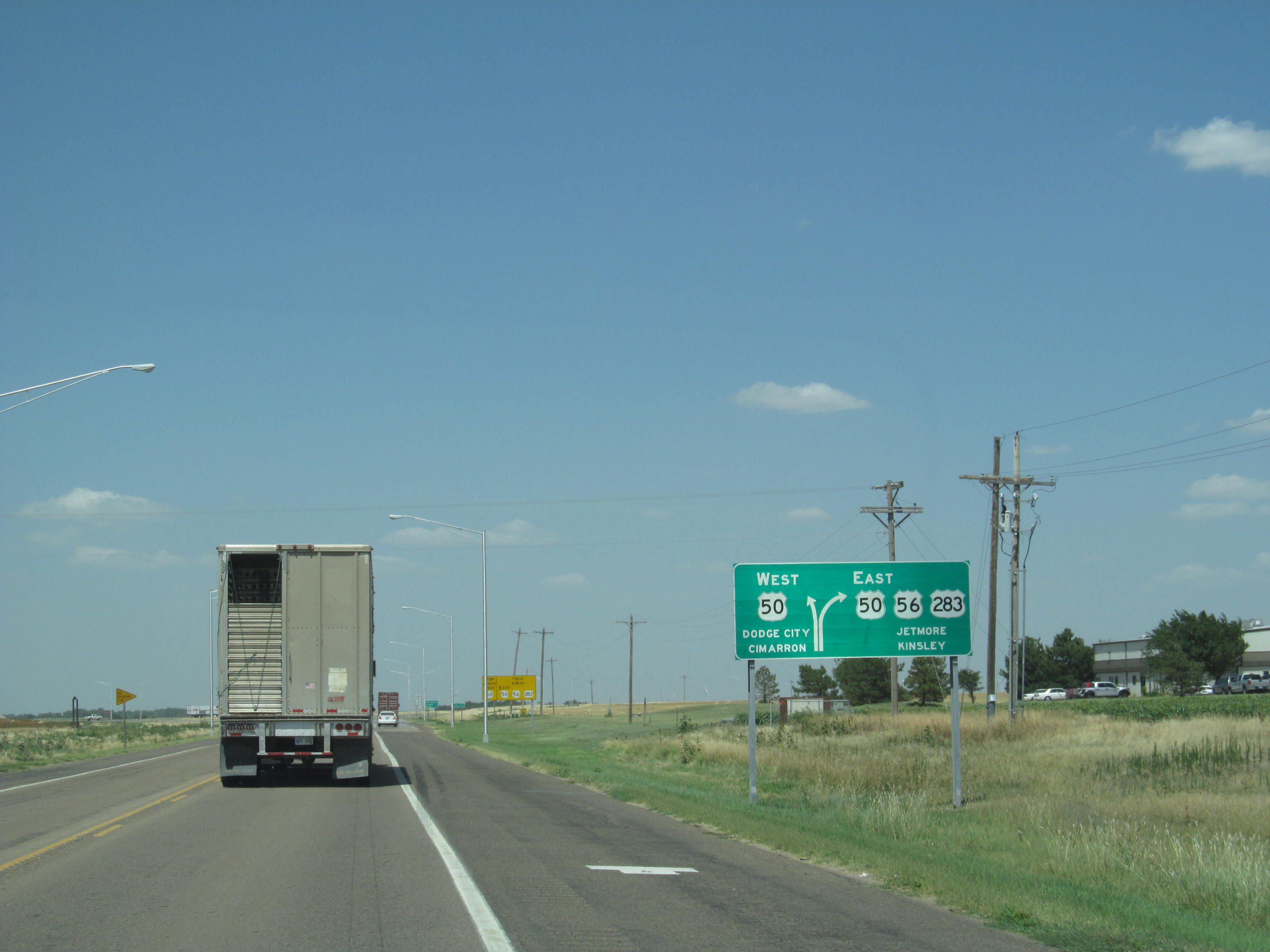
US-283 and US-56 approaching US-50 north of Dodge City

At Dodge City, US-283 jogs east. It meets with U.S. Route 400, but the two highways do not stay joined for long; US-400 splits and heads southeast towards Greensburg, while US-283 continues eastbound past the Dodge City Regional Airport. After passing the airport, the route then bends northeast before joining U.S. Route 50 and U.S. Route 56 for a brief stint.

US-50 and US-56 split east towards Kinsley, and US-283 resumes a due northerly course through open fields before reaching Jetmore, where K-156 crosses in an east–west direction. K-156 heads to Garden City westbound and Great Bend eastbound. The highway continues on another stretch through sparsely populated farmland before reaching Ness City and K-96, the first of two junctions in Ness County. The other junction in the county is at K-4 near Ransom. The highway reaches Interstate 70 in WaKeeney, and makes a brief jog east through downtown WaKeeney before turning back to the north. US-283 between Ransom and I-70 was closed for much of 2006 as part of a major reconstruction program.

The highway continues north to Hill City, where it crosses U.S. Route 24. The route stays on course until it reaches southern Norton County, where it has a brief concurrency with K-9. At the split, K-9 continues west to Lenora, and US-283 resumes a straight northerly direction until the city of Norton, where after crossing U.S. Route 36, it reaches Nebraska 11 miles (18 km) later.

With the exception of small sections in Dodge City, all portions of US-283 in Kansas are two-laned.

== History ==
K-21
- Existed: 1927–c. 1941

In 1927, the highway that would become US-283 was established as K-21 from the Oklahoma border north to the Nebraska border. In 1933, US-281 was extended north from Oklahoma over K-21 to US-50S and US-154 in Dodge City. By 1936, it had been extended further north to K-96 in Ness City along K-21. Between July 1938 and 1940, US-283 was extended north to US-36, US-83 and US-183 in Norton. In an August 7, 1941 resolution, a one mile (1.6 km) section of K-21 was realigned at the Nebraska border to eliminate two sharp curves. Between 1941 and 1944, US-283 was extended north into Nebraska, resulting in K-21 being completely decommissioned. Also between 1941 and 1945, US-83 and US-183 were swapped within Nebraska and a small portion into Kansas, which straightened their alignment and eliminated their overlap in Norton. The former alignment of US-83 from northeast of Selden to east of Woodruff became US-383.

=== Realignments ===
In an August 20, 1935 resolution, US-283 was slightly realigned along its overlap with US-160 to eliminate a few sharp curves. In a February 26, 1958 resolution, a section of I-70 was approved from Collyer east to Ogallah, which included a new diamond interchange to be built at US-283 to serve WaKeeney. K-383 was assigned to the portions of former US-383 in Kansas from US-83 near Selden to a concurrency with US-183 at the Nebraska state line in 1981. In an April 1, 1981 resolution, US-283 Spur was redesignated as US-40 Business in WaKeeney. In another April 1, 1981 resolution, US-156 was redesignated as K-156 in Jetmore. In an August 24, 1981 resolution, US-50 Alternate along the north side of Dodge City became a new alignment of US-50, and the former US-50 that overlapped US-283 and US-56 through Dodge City became US-50 Business. In a December 1, 1994 resolution, US-400 was established in Kansas, which created an overlap with US-283, US-56 and US-50 Business from the south end of the overlap with US-50 Business to the former K-129. In an April 25, 2008 resolution, the overlap with US-50 Business in Dodge City was removed as it was decommissioned. Also the overlap with US-400 was changed to run from the southern end of US-283's overlap with US-56 north to where US-400 originally turned east off US-283 and US-56.

== Major intersections ==
County	Location	mi	km	Destinations	Notes
Clark		0.000	0.000	US 283 south	Continuation into Oklahoma
Clark		13.590	21.871	US-160 east – Ashland	Southern end of US-160 overlap
Clark		20.160	32.444	US-160 west – Meade	Northern end of US-160 overlap
Clark	Minneola	31.672	50.971	US-54 (Front Street) – Meade, Greensburg	
Ford	Dodge City	50.321	80.984	US-56 west / US-400 west / 2nd Street – Sublette, Cimarron	Roundabout; southern end of US-56 and US-400 overlap
Ford	Dodge City	53.751	86.504	US-400 east – Greensburg	Northern end of US-400 overlap; former US-154
Ford	Dodge City	57.463	92.478	US-50 west – Cimarron	Southern end of US-50 overlap
Ford	Wright	59.739	96.141	US-50 east / US-56 east (Jewell Road) – Kinsley	Northern end of US-50 and US-56 overlap
Hodgeman	Jetmore	81.247	130.754	K-156 – Garden City, Larned	Former US-156
Ness	Ness City	106.601	171.558	K-96 (Sycamore Street)	
Ness		119.299	191.993	K-4	
Trego	WaKeeney	145.470	234.111	I-70 / US-40 – Hays, Denver US 40 Bus. begins	I-70 exit 127; diamond interchange; western terminus of US-40 Business; southern end of US-40 Business overlap
Trego	WaKeeney	146.935	236.469	US 40 Bus. east (13th Street south)	Northern end of US-40 Business overlap
Graham	Hill City	170.973	275.154	US-24 (Main Street)	
Norton		188.985	304.142	K-9 east – Logan	Southern end of K-9 overlap
Norton		190.989	307.367	K-9 west – Lenora	Northern end of K-9 overlap
Norton	Norton	205.737	331.102	US-36 / K-383 (Holme Street) – Oberlin, Phillipsburg	
40th parallel north		217.004	349.234	US 283 north / Road A – Arapahoe	Kansas–Nebraska line; US 283 continues into Nebraska
1.000 mi = 1.609 km; 1.000 km = 0.621 mi: Concurrency terminus

== Former spur ==
U.S. Highway 283 Spur
- Location: WaKeeney
- Existed: c. 1963.–April 1, 1981

U.S. Route 283 Spur (US-283 Spur) was a spur route that existed in WaKeeney. It began at a diamond interchange with I-70 and US-40 exit 128, and traveled north and ended at US-283. US-283 Spur first appears on the 1963–1964 State Highway map. In an April 1, 1981 resolution, US-283 Spur was redesignated as US-40 Business (US-40 Bus.) in WaKeeney.

U.S. Route 283
Previous state: Oklahoma	Kansas	Next state: Nebraska
