= Dresden Township, Decatur County, Kansas =

Dresden Township
- Township
- Location in Decatur County
- Coordinates: 39°35′58″N 100°27′32″W
- Country: United States
- State: Kansas
- County: Decatur

Area
  - Total: 35.7 sq mi (92.5 km^{2})
  - Land: 35.71 sq mi (92.49 km^{2})
  - Water: 0.0039 sq mi (0.01 km^{2}) 0.01%
- Elevation: 2,694 ft (821 m)

Population (2020)
  - Total: 91
  - Density: 2.5/sq mi (0.98/km^{2})
- GNIS feature ID: 0471071

Dresden Township is a township in Decatur County, Kansas, United States. As of the 2020 census, its population was 91.

== Geography ==
Dresden Township covers an area of 35.71 square miles (92.5 km^{2}) and contains one incorporated settlement, Dresden.

The stream of North Fork Prairie Dog Creek runs through this township.
