= Oberlin Township, Kansas =

Oberlin Township
- Township
- Location in Decatur County
- Coordinates: 39°46′52″N 100°34′47″W
- Country: United States
- State: Kansas
- County: Decatur

Area
  - Total: 34.26 sq mi (88.74 km^{2})
  - Land: 34.24 sq mi (88.67 km^{2})
  - Water: 0.027 sq mi (0.07 km^{2}) 0.08%
- Elevation: 2,582 ft (787 m)

Population (2020)
  - Total: 81
  - Density: 2.4/sq mi (0.91/km^{2})
- GNIS feature ID: 0471011

Oberlin Township is a township in Decatur County, Kansas, United States. As of the 2020 census, its population was 81.

== Geography ==
Oberlin Township covers an area of 34.26 square miles (88.7 km^{2}) and contains one incorporated settlement, Oberlin (the county seat).

The streams of North Fork Sappa Creek and South Fork Sappa Creek run through this township.
