= Lincoln Township, Decatur County, Kansas =

Lincoln Township
- Township
- Location in Decatur County
- Coordinates: 39°51′23″N 100°13′16″W
- Country: United States
- State: Kansas
- County: Decatur

Area
  - Total: 35.61 sq mi (92.22 km^{2})
  - Land: 35.6 sq mi (92.2 km^{2})
  - Water: 0.0077 sq mi (0.02 km^{2}) 0.02%
- Elevation: 2,585 ft (788 m)

Population (2020)
  - Total: 168
  - Density: 4.72/sq mi (1.82/km^{2})
- GNIS feature ID: 0470937

Lincoln Township is a township in Decatur County, Kansas, United States. As of the 2020 census, its population was 168.

== Geography ==
Lincoln Township covers an area of 35.61 square miles (92.2 km^{2}) and contains one incorporated settlement, Norcatur. According to the USGS, it contains one cemetery, Shirley.
