= Oberlin High School, Jamaica =

Oberlin High School

Location
- Lawrence Tavern; Saint Andrew; Jamaica
- Coordinates: 18.1333333°N 76.85°W

Information
- Motto: Hunc Montem Mihi Da (Now therefore give me this mountain)
- Established: January 1946
- School number: (876) 942-6940 or 942-6944
- Principal: Mrs. Michelle Spencer
- Grades: 7 - 13
- Gender: Male and Female
- Hours in school day: 7
- Classrooms: 45
- Colours: Green and Burgundy
- Song: Hunc Montem Mihi Da
- Sports: Football, Cricket, Badminton, Table-Tennis, Track and Field
- Communities served: Glengoffe, Lawrence Tavern

Oberlin High School is a Jamaican high school located in West Rural Saint Andrew. The school was started in January 1946 as Oberlin College (not to be confused with Ohio's Oberlin College).
