= Harlan Township, Decatur County, Kansas =

Harlan Township
- Township
- Location in Decatur County
- Coordinates: 39°58′04″N 100°20′22″W
- Country: United States
- State: Kansas
- County: Decatur

Area
  - Total: 35.62 sq mi (92.26 km^{2})
  - Land: 35.61 sq mi (92.22 km^{2})
  - Water: 0.015 sq mi (0.04 km^{2}) 0.04%
- Elevation: 2,543 ft (775 m)

Population (2020)
  - Total: 31
  - Density: 0.87/sq mi (0.34/km^{2})
- GNIS feature ID: 0470931

Harlan Township is a township in Decatur County, Kansas, United States. As of the 2020 census, its population was 31.

== Geography ==
Harlan Township covers an area of 35.62 square miles (92.3 km^{2}) and contains no incorporated settlements. According to the USGS, it contains two cemeteries: Redman and White.
