= Garfield Township, Decatur County, Kansas =

Garfield Township
- Township
- Location in Decatur County
- Coordinates: 39°47′33″N 100°13′11″W
- Country: United States
- State: Kansas
- County: Decatur

Area
  - Total: 35.64 sq mi (92.31 km^{2})
  - Land: 35.64 sq mi (92.31 km^{2})
  - Water: 0 sq mi (0 km^{2}) 0%
- Elevation: 2,552 ft (778 m)

Population (2020)
  - Total: 42
  - Density: 1.2/sq mi (0.45/km^{2})
- GNIS feature ID: 0471024

Garfield Township is a township in Decatur County, Kansas, United States. As of the 2020 census, its population was 42.

== Geography ==
Garfield Township covers an area of 35.64 square miles (92.3 km^{2}) and contains no incorporated settlements. According to the USGS, it contains one cemetery, Clayton.
