= Cook Township, Kansas =

Cook Township
- Township
- Location in Decatur County
- Coordinates: 39°35′54″N 100°41′12″W
- Country: United States
- State: Kansas
- County: Decatur

Area
  - Total: 35.94 sq mi (93.08 km^{2})
  - Land: 36 sq mi (93 km^{2})
  - Water: 0.031 sq mi (0.08 km^{2}) 0.09%
- Elevation: 2,858 ft (871 m)

Population (2002)
  - Total: 19
  - Density: 0.53/sq mi (0.20/km^{2})
- GNIS feature ID: 0471062

Cook Township is a township in Decatur County, Kansas, United States. As of the 2020 census, its population was 19.

== Geography ==
Cook Township covers an area of 35.94 square miles (93.1 km^{2}) and contains no incorporated settlements. According to the USGS, it contains one cemetery, Hawkeye.
