= Jennings, Kansas =

City in Decatur County, Kansas

- City
- Location within Decatur County and Kansas

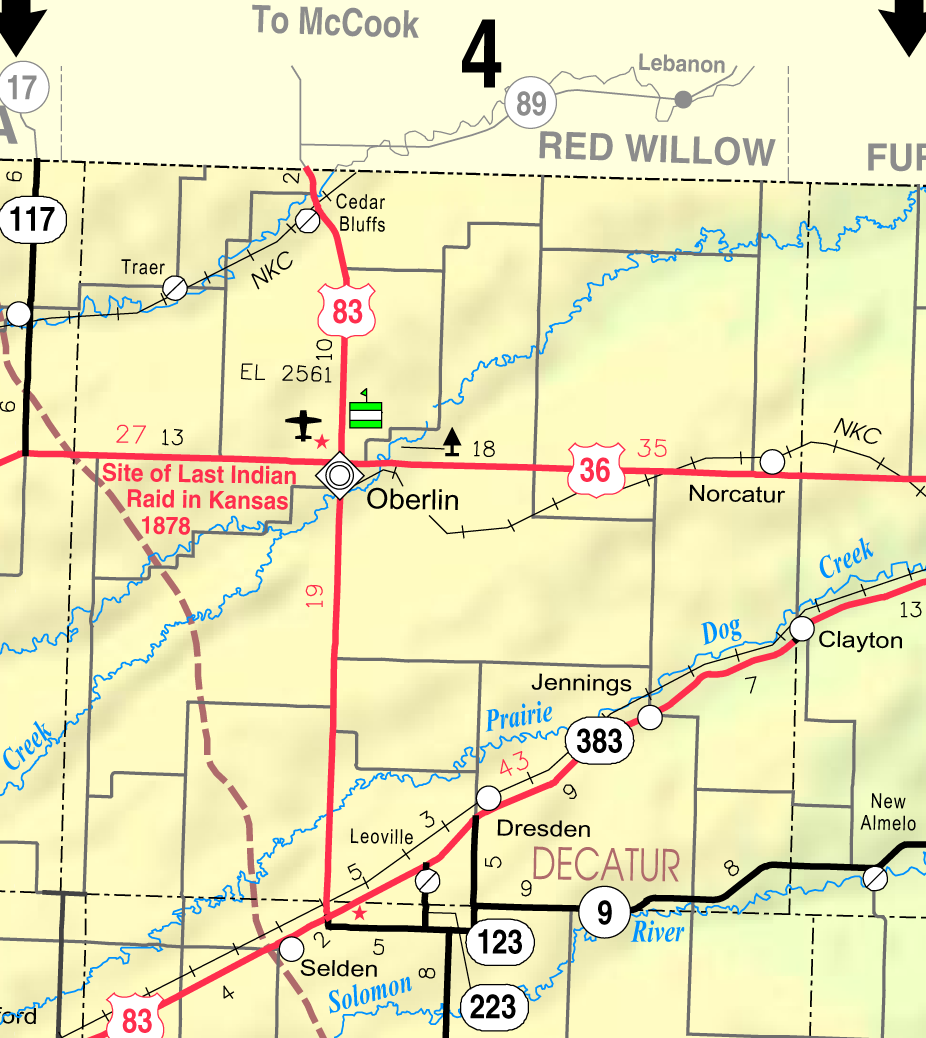
- KDOT map of Decatur County (legend)
- Coordinates: 39°40′49″N 100°17′38″W
- Country: United States
- State: Kansas
- County: Decatur
- Founded: 1870s
- Platted: 1888
- Incorporated: 1906
- Named for: Warren Jennings

Area
  - Total: 0.27 sq mi (0.69 km^{2})
  - Land: 0.27 sq mi (0.69 km^{2})
  - Water: 0 sq mi (0.00 km^{2})
- Elevation: 2,510 ft (770 m)

Population (2020)
  - Total: 81
  - Density: 300/sq mi (120/km^{2})
- Time zone: UTC-6 (CST)
  - Summer (DST): UTC-5 (CDT)
- ZIP Code: 67643
- Area code: 785
- FIPS code: 20-35375
- GNIS ID: 471077

Jennings is a city in Decatur County, Kansas, United States. As of the 2020 census, the population of the city was 81.

== History ==
The first post office at Jennings was established in 1874, but the post office there was called Slab City until 1879.

Jennings was laid out in 1888. It was named for Warren Jennings, a landowner.

Jennings was located on the Chicago, Rock Island and Pacific Railroad.

Jennings was a popular area for Czech immigrants to settle and start their farms.

== Geography ==
Jennings is located at 39°40′49″N 100°17′38″W (39.680197, -100.293918). According to the United States Census Bureau, the city has a total area of 0.27 square miles (0.70 km^{2}), all land.

== Demographics ==
Historical population
Census	Pop.	Note	%±
1910	259		—
1920	253		−2.3%
1930	344		36.0%
1940	311		−9.6%
1950	330		6.1%
1960	292		−11.5%
1970	224		−23.3%
1980	194		−13.4%
1990	188		−3.1%
2000	146		−22.3%
2010	96		−34.2%
2020	81		−15.6%
U.S. Decennial Census

=== 2020 census ===
The 2020 United States census counted 81 people, 52 households, and 20 families in Jennings. The population density was 302.2 per square mile (116.7/km^{2}). There were 76 housing units at an average density of 283.6 per square mile (109.5/km^{2}). The racial makeup was 91.36% (74) white or European American (91.36% non-Hispanic white), 2.47% (2) black or African-American, 3.7% (3) Native American or Alaska Native, 0.0% (0) Asian, 0.0% (0) Pacific Islander or Native Hawaiian, 0.0% (0) from other races, and 2.47% (2) from two or more races. Hispanic or Latino of any race was 0.0% (0) of the population.

Of the 52 households, 17.3% had children under the age of 18; 26.9% were married couples living together; 23.1% had a female householder with no spouse or partner present. 55.8% of households consisted of individuals and 26.9% had someone living alone who was 65 years of age or older. The average household size was 1.8 and the average family size was 2.3. The percent of those with a bachelor's degree or higher was estimated to be 9.9% of the population.

18.5% of the population was under the age of 18, 2.5% from 18 to 24, 11.1% from 25 to 44, 33.3% from 45 to 64, and 34.6% who were 65 years of age or older. The median age was 53.5 years. For every 100 females, there were 84.1 males. For every 100 females ages 18 and older, there were 100.0 males.

The 2016–2020 5-year American Community Survey estimates show that the median household income was $42,917 (with a margin of error of +/- $11,262) and the median family income was $41,250 (+/- $9,857). Males had a median income of $46,750 (+/- $9,918). The median income for those above 16 years old was $40,000 (+/- $29,952). Approximately, 20.0% of families and 24.5% of the population were below the poverty line, including 5.0% of those under the age of 18 and 23.8% of those ages 65 or over.

=== 2010 census ===
As of the census of 2010, there were 96 people, 50 households, and 30 families living in the city. The population density was 355.6 inhabitants per square mile (137.3/km^{2}). There were 89 housing units at an average density of 329.6 per square mile (127.3/km^{2}). The racial makeup of the city was 99.0% White and 1.0% from two or more races.

There were 50 households, of which 10.0% had children under the age of 18 living with them, 48.0% were married couples living together, 6.0% had a female householder with no husband present, 6.0% had a male householder with no wife present, and 40.0% were non-families. 34.0% of all households were made up of individuals, and 18% had someone living alone who was 65 years of age or older. The average household size was 1.92 and the average family size was 2.37.

The median age in the city was 61.7 years. 8.3% of residents were under the age of 18; 5.2% were between the ages of 18 and 24; 14.6% were from 25 to 44; 26.1% were from 45 to 64; and 45.8% were 65 years of age or older. The gender makeup of the city was 50.0% male and 50.0% female.

== Education ==
South of Highway 383 is served by Hoxie USD 412 public school district, north of the highway is served by Oberlin USD 294.

Jennings schools were closed in school unification. The Jennings High School mascot was the Coyotes.
