= Prairie Dog Township, Decatur County, Kansas =

Prairie Dog Township
- Township
- Location in Decatur County
- Coordinates: 39°35′30″N 100°33′32″W
- Country: United States
- State: Kansas
- County: Decatur

Area
  - Total: 35.76 sq mi (92.62 km^{2})
  - Land: 35.76 sq mi (92.61 km^{2})
  - Water: 0.0039 sq mi (0.01 km^{2}) 0.01%
- Elevation: 2,769 ft (844 m)

Population (2020)
  - Total: 27
  - Density: 0.76/sq mi (0.29/km^{2})
- GNIS feature ID: 0471064

Prairie Dog Township is a township in Decatur County, Kansas, United States. As of the 2020 census, its population was 27.

== Geography ==
Prairie Dog Township covers an area of 35.76 square miles (92.6 km^{2}) and contains no incorporated settlements. According to the USGS, it contains one cemetery, Shibboleth.
