= Decatur County, Kansas =

County in Kansas, United States

- County
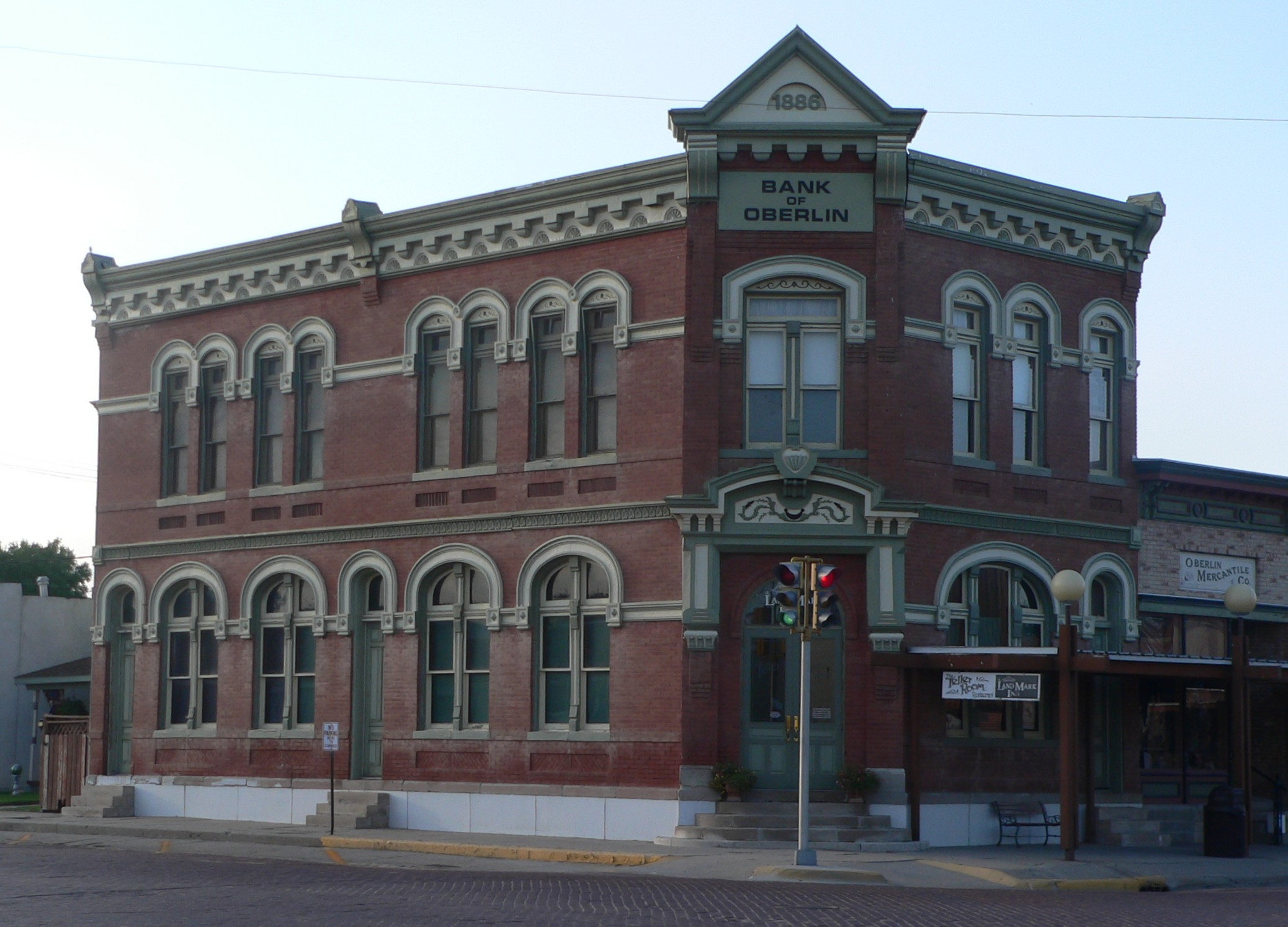
- Bank of Oberlin (2014)

- Location within the U.S. state of Kansas
- Coordinates: 39°48′N 100°28′W
- Country: United States
- State: Kansas
- Founded: March 20, 1873
- Named for: Stephen Decatur, Jr.
- Seat: Oberlin
- Largest city: Oberlin

Area
  - Total: 894 sq mi (2,320 km^{2})
  - Land: 894 sq mi (2,320 km^{2})
  - Water: 0.6 sq mi (1.6 km^{2}) 0.07%

Population (2020)
  - Total: 2,764
  - Estimate (2025): 2,716 ▼
  - Density: 3.1/sq mi (1.2/km^{2})
- Time zone: UTC−6 (Central)
  - Summer (DST): UTC−5 (CDT)
- Area code: 785
- Congressional district: 1st
- Website: https://www.dccoks.org/

Decatur County is a county located in Northwest Kansas. Its county seat and most populous city is Oberlin. As of the 2020 census, the county population was 2,764. The county was named in honor of Stephen Decatur, Jr., a commodore in the United States Navy who served during both Barbary Wars in North Africa, the Quasi-War with France, and the War of 1812 with Britain.

== History ==
=== 19th century ===
In 1854, the Kansas Territory was organized, then in 1861 Kansas became the 34th U.S. state.

Decatur County was established by an act of the state legislature on 1873-03-20, which defined the original borders of the county as:

Commencing where the east line of range 26 west, intersects the fortieth degree of north latitude; thence south, with the range line, to the first standard parallel; thence west with said parallel to the east line of range 31 west; thence north with said range line to the fortieth degree of north latitude; thence east with said parallel to the place of beginning.

The county had been surveyed the previous year, and its first settlers had been arriving since then.

Independent county government was established on 1879-12-11, by proclamation of Governor John A. Martin in response to a petition. Martin originally proclaimed Oberlin as the county seat, as an initial temporary arrangement. It was chosen as the permanent seat by an election on 1880-02-03.

The county is named for the Navy war hero Commodore Stephen Decatur, Jr., who served during the First Barbary War and the Second Barbary War and the War of 1812.

In 1878, the Sappa Creek valley in Decatur county was the scene of the last raid by Native Americans (Indians) in Kansas. In the Northern Cheyenne Exodus after the Battle of Punished Woman's Fork, a band of Cheyenne needing horses and provisions raged through the valley, killing more than 30 civilians and raping several woman. Several Cheyenne elderly, women, and children were also killed in the region by soldiers and civilians. In Oberlin, the Decatur County Last Indian Raid Museum commemorates the Cheyenne raid.

The county's first newspaper was the Oberlin Herald, established on 1879-06-12 by Humphrey & Counter. Later Oberlin newspapers included the Oberlin Eye and the Oberlin Opinion. The Norcatur Register was published in Norcatur, and there were two more newspapers in Dresden and Jennings as of 1909.

== Geography ==
According to the U.S. Census Bureau, the county has a total area of 894 square miles (2,320 km^{2}), of which 894 square miles (2,320 km^{2}) is land and 0.6 square miles (1.6 km^{2}) (0.07%) is water.

=== Geology and hydrology ===
The county is crossed by Beaver Creek and Long Branch Creek in the north, by Sappa Creek in the middle, and by Prairie Dog Creek and South Fork Solomon River in the south. Sappa has two forks, north and south, and Prairie Dog's principal branch is Tom Cat.

=== Adjacent counties ===
- Red Willow County, Nebraska (north)
- Furnas County, Nebraska (northeast)
- Norton County (east)
- Sheridan County (south)
- Thomas County (southwest)
- Rawlins County (west)

== Demographics ==
Historical population
Census	Pop.	Note	%±
1880	4,180		—
1890	8,414		101.3%
1900	9,234		9.7%
1910	8,976		−2.8%
1920	8,121		−9.5%
1930	8,866		9.2%
1940	7,434		−16.2%
1950	6,185		−16.8%
1960	5,778		−6.6%
1970	4,988		−13.7%
1980	4,509		−9.6%
1990	4,021		−10.8%
2000	3,472		−13.7%
2010	2,961		−14.7%
2020	2,764		−6.7%
2025 (est.)	2,716	▼	−1.7%
U.S. Decennial Census; 1790-1960 1900-1990; 1990-2000 2010-2020

=== 2020 census ===
As of the 2020 census, the county had a population of 2,764. The median age was 50.8 years. 20.4% of residents were under the age of 18 and 27.9% of residents were 65 years of age or older. For every 100 females there were 104.6 males, and for every 100 females age 18 and over there were 103.0 males age 18 and over. 0.0% of residents lived in urban areas, while 100.0% lived in rural areas.

The racial makeup of the county was 94.2% White, 0.3% Black or African American, 0.3% American Indian and Alaska Native, 0.5% Asian, 0.0% Native Hawaiian and Pacific Islander, 0.3% from some other race, and 4.3% from two or more races. Hispanic or Latino residents of any race comprised 2.7% of the population.

There were 1,295 households in the county, of which 21.9% had children under the age of 18 living with them and 23.5% had a female householder with no spouse or partner present. About 38.8% of all households were made up of individuals and 20.0% had someone living alone who was 65 years of age or older.

There were 1,640 housing units, of which 21.0% were vacant. Among occupied housing units, 77.1% were owner-occupied and 22.9% were renter-occupied. The homeowner vacancy rate was 3.4% and the rental vacancy rate was 14.2%.

In 1879 the population was just over 1,500. By 1886 there were 6,300 people in the county, up from 4,067 in 1885. By the 1910 Census this had risen to 8.976.

=== 2000 census ===
As of the 2000 census, there were 3,472 people, 1,494 households, and 981 families residing in the county. The population density was 4 people per square mile (1.5 people/km^{2}). There were 1,821 housing units at an average density of 2 per square mile (0.77/km^{2}). The racial makeup of the county was 97.87% White, 0.52% Black or African American, 0.09% Native American, 0.14% Asian, 0.12% Pacific Islander, 0.37% from other races, and 0.89% from two or more races. Hispanic or Latino of any race were 0.98% of the population.

There were 1,494 households, out of which 25.80% had children under the age of 18 living with them, 57.00% were married couples living together, 5.60% had a female householder with no husband present, and 34.30% were non-families. 32.80% of all households were made up of individuals, and 17.50% had someone living alone who was 65 years of age or older. The average household size was 2.24 and the average family size was 2.83.

In the county, the population was spread out, with 23.60% under the age of 18, 4.70% from 18 to 24, 22.90% from 25 to 44, 22.60% from 45 to 64, and 26.20% who were 65 years of age or older. The median age was 44 years. For every 100 females there were 97.50 males. For every 100 females age 18 and over, there were 91.40 males.

The median income for a household in the county was $30,257, and the median income for a family was $34,982. Males had a median income of $25,139 versus $17,368 for females. The per capita income for the county was $16,348. About 8.00% of families and 11.60% of the population were below the poverty line, including 17.20% of those under age 18 and 6.30% of those age 65 or over.

== Government ==
Decatur County is heavily Republican. The last time a Democratic candidate carried the county was Franklin D. Roosevelt in 1936.

=== Presidential elections ===
Presidential election results

United States presidential election results for Decatur County, Kansas
Year	Republican		Democratic		Third party(ies)	
Year	No.	%	No.	%	No.	%
1888	1,224	57.41%	731	34.29%	177	8.30%
1892	619	38.59%	0	0.00%	985	61.41%
1896	594	36.37%	1,032	63.20%	7	0.43%
1900	848	41.77%	1,158	57.04%	24	1.18%
1904	1,215	59.71%	411	20.20%	409	20.10%
1908	898	39.33%	1,250	54.75%	135	5.91%
1912	256	14.88%	955	55.52%	509	29.59%
1916	1,007	27.73%	2,431	66.95%	193	5.32%
1920	1,448	51.55%	1,221	43.47%	140	4.98%
1924	1,621	46.89%	1,218	35.23%	618	17.88%
1928	2,314	66.53%	1,129	32.46%	35	1.01%
1932	1,439	36.26%	2,422	61.02%	108	2.72%
1936	1,727	42.08%	2,362	57.55%	15	0.37%
1940	2,018	56.16%	1,546	43.03%	29	0.81%
1944	1,758	59.92%	1,159	39.50%	17	0.58%
1948	1,545	51.41%	1,402	46.66%	58	1.93%
1952	2,451	74.54%	821	24.97%	16	0.49%
1956	2,028	68.58%	920	31.11%	9	0.30%
1960	1,846	63.83%	1,038	35.89%	8	0.28%
1964	1,382	50.96%	1,314	48.45%	16	0.59%
1968	1,654	65.74%	652	25.91%	210	8.35%
1972	1,707	70.22%	616	25.34%	108	4.44%
1976	1,232	52.74%	1,011	43.28%	93	3.98%
1980	1,642	72.98%	443	19.69%	165	7.33%
1984	1,770	78.15%	467	20.62%	28	1.24%
1988	1,291	60.10%	793	36.92%	64	2.98%
1992	940	45.00%	576	27.57%	573	27.43%
1996	1,255	68.06%	417	22.61%	172	9.33%
2000	1,255	71.35%	424	24.10%	80	4.55%
2004	1,355	77.87%	355	20.40%	30	1.72%
2008	1,189	76.81%	343	22.16%	16	1.03%
2012	1,218	79.50%	266	17.36%	48	3.13%
2016	1,210	83.33%	178	12.26%	64	4.41%
2020	1,260	84.11%	218	14.55%	20	1.34%
2024	1,217	83.82%	215	14.81%	20	1.38%

=== Laws ===
Following amendment to the Kansas Constitution in 1986, the county remained a prohibition, or "dry", county until 2002, when voters approved the sale of alcoholic liquor by the individual drink with a 30% food sales requirement.

== Education ==
There were 101 school districts in the county in 1909.

=== Unified school districts ===
- Oberlin USD 294

== Communities ==
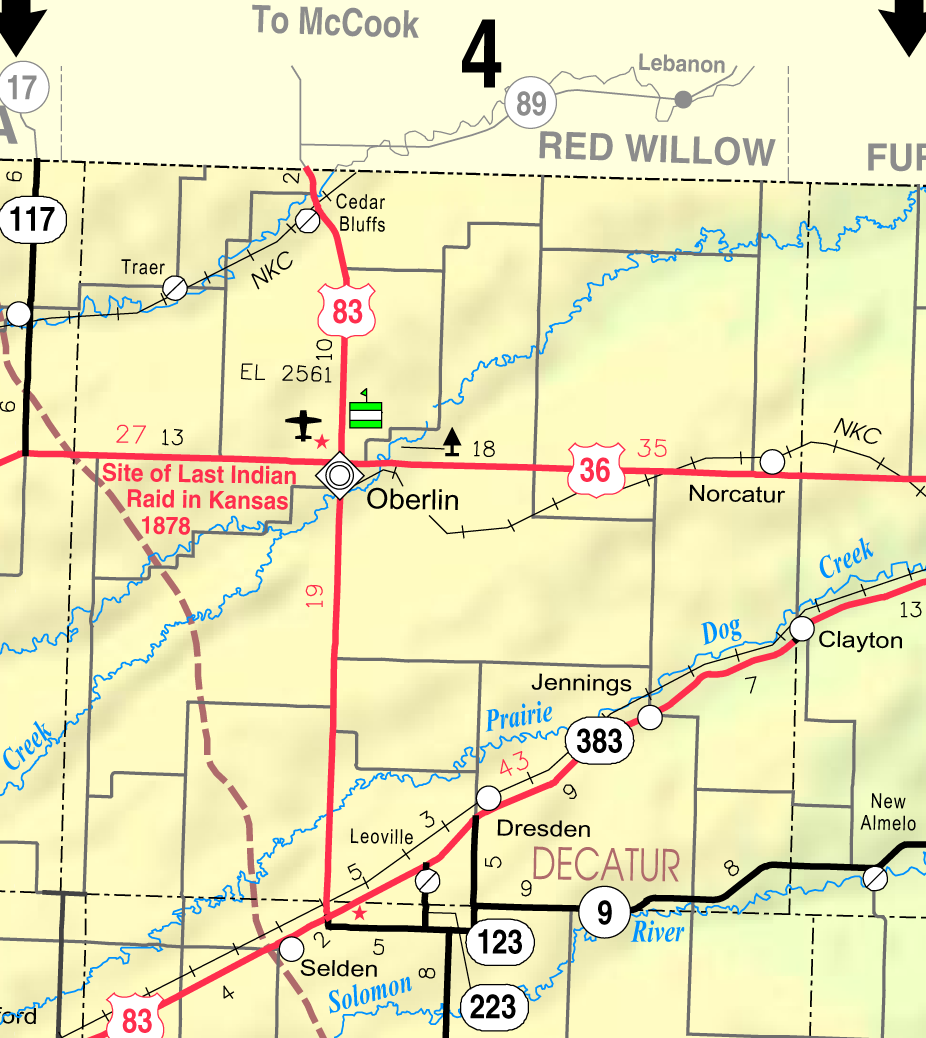
2005 map of Decatur County (map legend)

List of townships / incorporated cities / unincorporated communities / extinct former communities within Decatur County.

=== Cities ===
‡ means a community has portions in an adjacent county.

- Clayton‡
- Dresden
- Jennings
- Norcatur
- Oberlin (county seat)

=== Unincorporated communities ===
- Allison
- Cedar Bluffs
- Kanona
- Leoville
- Lyle
- Traer

=== Ghost towns ===
- Bassetville
- Decatur
- Hawkeye
- Hooker
- Jackson
- Lund
- Sheffield
- Shibboleth
- Stephen
- Vallonia

=== Post offices ===
The first post office in the county was Sappa, established in April 1874 by postmaster J. A. Rodehaver. It was located where Oberlin now is. In 1886 there were seventeen post offices in the county: Allison, Altory, Bassettville, Cedar Bluffs, Decatur, Hawkeye, Hooker, Jackson, Jenings, Lyle, Oberlin, Norcatur, Sheffield, Shibboleth, Stephen, Traer, and Vallonia.

=== Townships ===
Decatur County is divided into twenty-five townships. The city of Oberlin is considered governmentally independent and is excluded from the census figures for the townships. In the following table, the population center is the largest city (or cities) included in that township's population total, if it is of a significant size.

Township	FIPS	Population center	Population	Population density /km^{2} (/sq mi)	Land area km^{2} (sq mi)	Water area km^{2} (sq mi)	Water %	Geographic coordinates
Allison	01300		39	0 (1)	93 (36)	0 (0)	0.01%	39°35′36″N 100°12′24″W
Altory	01650		16	0 (0)	93 (36)	0 (0)	0%	39°47′22″N 100°21′15″W
Bassettville	04475		26	0 (1)	93 (36)	0 (0)	0%	39°41′12″N 100°40′38″W
Beaver	05050		86	1 (2)	92 (36)	0 (0)	0.11%	39°58′42″N 100°34′2″W
Center	11650		60	1 (2)	93 (36)	0 (0)	0.03%	39°47′5″N 100°27′38″W
Cook	15375		44	0 (1)	93 (36)	0 (0)	0.08%	39°36′16″N 100°40′32″W
Custer	16850		27	0 (1)	93 (36)	0 (0)	0.04%	39°41′17″N 100°26′59″W
Dresden	18625		141	2 (4)	92 (36)	0 (0)	0.01%	39°36′39″N 100°27′5″W
Finley	23425		39	0 (1)	93 (36)	0 (0)	0%	39°57′42″N 100°41′20″W
Garfield	25525		41	0 (1)	92 (36)	0 (0)	0%	39°46′38″N 100°14′44″W
Grant	27600		31	0 (1)	92 (36)	0 (0)	0.07%	39°57′36″N 100°14′11″W
Harlan	30050		51	1 (1)	92 (36)	0 (0)	0.05%	39°56′50″N 100°20′56″W
Jennings	35400		173	2 (5)	93 (36)	0 (0)	0.34%	39°40′35″N 100°18′56″W
Liberty	39975		48	1 (1)	91 (35)	0 (0)	0.03%	39°53′2″N 100°33′31″W
Lincoln	40600		203	2 (6)	92 (36)	0 (0)	0.02%	39°50′58″N 100°12′21″W
Logan	41825		52	1 (1)	93 (36)	0 (0)	0%	39°52′38″N 100°42′42″W
Lyon	43450		24	0 (1)	93 (36)	0 (0)	0%	39°36′52″N 100°21′8″W
Oberlin	52025		91	1 (3)	89 (34)	0 (0)	0.08%	39°47′32″N 100°34′20″W
Olive	52675		68	1 (2)	92 (35)	1 (0)	0.65%	39°51′43″N 100°28′18″W
Pleasant Valley	56525		46	0 (1)	93 (36)	0 (0)	0.05%	39°41′53″N 100°13′59″W
Prairie Dog	57475		50	1 (1)	93 (36)	0 (0)	0.01%	39°36′33″N 100°33′49″W
Roosevelt	61025		32	0 (1)	93 (36)	0 (0)	0.07%	39°53′1″N 100°21′43″W
Sappa	63050		43	0 (1)	93 (36)	0 (0)	0.04%	39°45′57″N 100°41′48″W
Sherman	64900		25	0 (1)	92 (36)	0 (0)	0.01%	39°57′5″N 100°28′7″W
Summit	69075		22	0 (1)	93 (36)	0 (0)	0.09%	39°41′27″N 100°34′37″W
Sources: "Census 2000 U.S. Gazetteer Files". U.S. Census Bureau, Geography Division. Archived from the original on August 2, 2002.

This list has remained the same since 1910. In 1886 there had been just eleven: Bassettville, Beaver, Center, Custer. Garfield, Grant, Jennings, Logan, Oberlin, Olive, and Prairie Dog. Originally in 1879, the county commissioners established just six townships: Grant, Beaver, Bassettville, Oberlin, Prairie Dog, and Jennings.

== See also ==
- National Register of Historic Places listings in Decatur County, Kansas

Community information for Kansas

- Kansas locations by per capita income
- List of counties in Kansas
- List of townships in Kansas
- List of cities in Kansas
- List of unincorporated communities in Kansas
- List of ghost towns in Kansas
