= Hoxie, Kansas =

City in Sheridan County, Kansas

- City and County seat
- Location within Sheridan County and Kansas

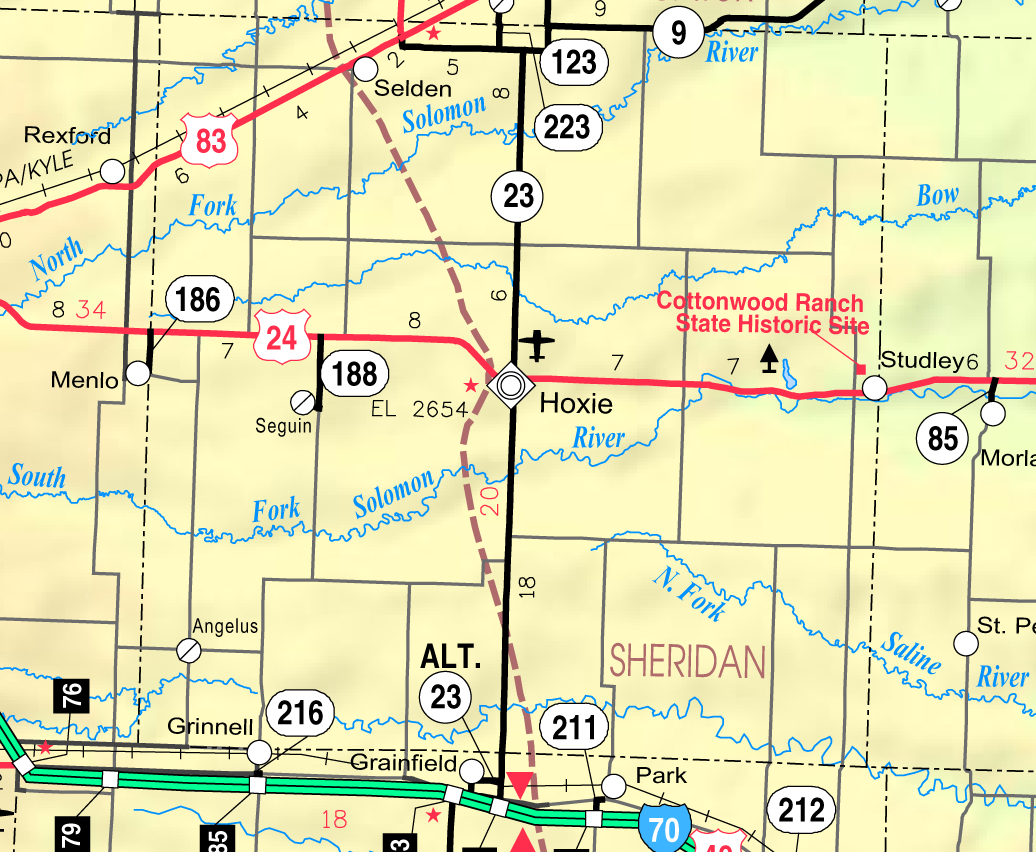
- KDOT map of Sheridan County (legend)
- Coordinates: 39°21′21″N 100°26′23″W
- Country: United States
- State: Kansas
- County: Sheridan
- Founded: 1886
- Incorporated: 1886
- Named for: Herbert Hoxie

Area
  - Total: 0.86 sq mi (2.23 km^{2})
  - Land: 0.86 sq mi (2.23 km^{2})
  - Water: 0 sq mi (0.00 km^{2})
- Elevation: 2,704 ft (824 m)

Population (2020)
  - Total: 1,211
  - Density: 1,410/sq mi (543/km^{2})
- Time zone: UTC-6 (CST)
  - Summer (DST): UTC-5 (CDT)
- ZIP Code: 67740
- Area code: 785
- FIPS code: 20-33350
- GNIS ID: 2394432
- Website: City website

Hoxie is a city in and the county seat of Sheridan County, Kansas, United States. As of the 2020 census, the population of the city was 1,211.

== History ==
Hoxie was laid out in early 1886. The town founders convinced the residents of Kenneth, a community three miles to the north and the current county seat, to move south (including their buildings) at their expense to the new site of Hoxie. The residents of Kenneth knew the coming rail line would pass through Hoxie and not their town as they had hoped, so the offer was promising. The towns agreed to consolidate and carry out that plan, making Hoxie the new county seat. It was named for H.M. Hoxie, a railroad official. The railroad (which became part of the Union Pacific Railroad) arrived in 1888.

The 99-mile Plainville-Colby branch of the Union Pacific railroad which passed through Hoxie was abandoned in 1998.

== Geography ==
According to the United States Census Bureau, the city has a total area of 0.84 square miles (2.18 km^{2}), all land.

=== Climate ===
The climate in this area is characterized by hot, humid summers and generally mild to cool winters. According to the Köppen Climate Classification system, Hoxie has a humid subtropical climate, abbreviated "Cfa" on climate maps.

Climate data for Hoxie, Kansas, 1991–2020 normals, extremes 1897–2020
Month	Jan	Feb	Mar	Apr	May	Jun	Jul	Aug	Sep	Oct	Nov	Dec	Year
Record high °F (°C)	83 (28)	85 (29)	93 (34)	100 (38)	102 (39)	112 (44)	114 (46)	111 (44)	107 (42)	98 (37)	90 (32)	83 (28)	114 (46)
Mean maximum °F (°C)	67.1 (19.5)	71.7 (22.1)	80.5 (26.9)	87.6 (30.9)	93.0 (33.9)	99.6 (37.6)	101.6 (38.7)	99.9 (37.7)	95.8 (35.4)	89.3 (31.8)	76.2 (24.6)	65.0 (18.3)	103.0 (39.4)
Mean daily maximum °F (°C)	41.8 (5.4)	44.8 (7.1)	55.6 (13.1)	64.5 (18.1)	73.9 (23.3)	85.3 (29.6)	90.0 (32.2)	87.6 (30.9)	80.0 (26.7)	67.2 (19.6)	53.7 (12.1)	42.9 (6.1)	65.6 (18.7)
Daily mean °F (°C)	30.3 (−0.9)	33.0 (0.6)	42.5 (5.8)	51.6 (10.9)	62.0 (16.7)	73.2 (22.9)	78.1 (25.6)	75.9 (24.4)	67.6 (19.8)	54.2 (12.3)	41.6 (5.3)	32.1 (0.1)	53.5 (12.0)
Mean daily minimum °F (°C)	18.8 (−7.3)	21.1 (−6.1)	29.4 (−1.4)	38.8 (3.8)	50.1 (10.1)	61.1 (16.2)	66.1 (18.9)	64.3 (17.9)	55.1 (12.8)	41.3 (5.2)	29.5 (−1.4)	21.2 (−6.0)	41.4 (5.2)
Mean minimum °F (°C)	−0.7 (−18.2)	2.0 (−16.7)	9.2 (−12.7)	21.4 (−5.9)	33.5 (0.8)	46.8 (8.2)	53.6 (12.0)	53.0 (11.7)	38.6 (3.7)	23.1 (−4.9)	10.6 (−11.9)	0.2 (−17.7)	−7.1 (−21.7)
Record low °F (°C)	−28 (−33)	−30 (−34)	−21 (−29)	3 (−16)	17 (−8)	33 (1)	41 (5)	37 (3)	23 (−5)	5 (−15)	−10 (−23)	−28 (−33)	−30 (−34)
Average precipitation inches (mm)	0.45 (11)	0.59 (15)	1.18 (30)	2.20 (56)	3.21 (82)	2.73 (69)	3.70 (94)	3.16 (80)	1.54 (39)	1.76 (45)	0.81 (21)	0.68 (17)	22.01 (559)
Average snowfall inches (cm)	4.2 (11)	6.2 (16)	3.9 (9.9)	0.8 (2.0)	0.3 (0.76)	0.0 (0.0)	0.0 (0.0)	0.0 (0.0)	0.2 (0.51)	1.4 (3.6)	1.5 (3.8)	5.2 (13)	23.7 (60.57)
Average precipitation days (≥ 0.01 in)	3.3	4.1	5.2	7.9	9.0	7.9	8.6	8.1	5.8	5.8	3.9	3.5	73.1
Average snowy days (≥ 0.1 in)	2.0	2.3	1.6	0.8	0.1	0.0	0.0	0.0	0.0	0.4	0.7	2.2	10.1
Source 1: NOAA
Source 2: National Weather Service

== Demographics ==
Historical population
Census	Pop.	Note	%±
1890	245		—
1900	250		2.0%
1910	532		112.8%
1920	616		15.8%
1930	800		29.9%
1940	957		19.6%
1950	1,157		20.9%
1960	1,289		11.4%
1970	1,419		10.1%
1980	1,462		3.0%
1990	1,342		−8.2%
2000	1,244		−7.3%
2010	1,201		−3.5%
2020	1,211		0.8%
U.S. Decennial Census

=== 2020 census ===
The 2020 United States census counted 1,211 people, 504 households, and 300 families in Hoxie. The population density was 1,408.1 per square mile (543.7/km^{2}). There were 572 housing units at an average density of 665.1 per square mile (256.8/km^{2}). The racial makeup was 90.42% (1,095) white or European American (87.2% non-Hispanic white), 0.17% (2) black or African-American, 0.58% (7) Native American or Alaska Native, 0.58% (7) Asian, 0.0% (0) Pacific Islander or Native Hawaiian, 1.98% (24) from other races, and 6.28% (76) from two or more races. Hispanic or Latino of any race was 8.26% (100) of the population.

Of the 504 households, 28.0% had children under the age of 18; 47.4% were married couples living together; 27.2% had a female householder with no spouse or partner present. 37.1% of households consisted of individuals and 16.5% had someone living alone who was 65 years of age or older. The average household size was 2.2 and the average family size was 3.0. The percent of those with a bachelor's degree or higher was estimated to be 22.0% of the population.

24.9% of the population was under the age of 18, 7.1% from 18 to 24, 23.6% from 25 to 44, 21.3% from 45 to 64, and 23.0% who were 65 years of age or older. The median age was 40.4 years. For every 100 females, there were 104.6 males. For every 100 females ages 18 and older, there were 108.0 males.

The 2016–2020 5-year American Community Survey estimates show that the median household income was $65,435 (with a margin of error of +/- $9,349) and the median family income was $72,250 (+/- $15,367). Males had a median income of $45,769 (+/- $8,752) versus $20,114 (+/- $12,304) for females. The median income for those above 16 years old was $31,602 (+/- $5,632). Approximately, 1.0% of families and 4.2% of the population were below the poverty line, including 0.0% of those under the age of 18 and 7.6% of those ages 65 or over.

=== 2010 census ===
As of the census of 2010, there were 1,201 people, 546 households, and 341 families residing in the city. The population density was 1,429.8 inhabitants per square mile (552.0/km^{2}). There were 605 housing units at an average density of 720.2 per square mile (278.1/km^{2}). The racial makeup of the city was 96.5% White, 0.1% Native American, 0.3% Asian, 1.4% from other races, and 1.7% from two or more races. Hispanic or Latino of any race were 3.6% of the population.

There were 546 households, of which 24.5% had children under the age of 18 living with them, 50.9% were married couples living together, 6.6% had a female householder with no husband present, 4.9% had a male householder with no wife present, and 37.5% were non-families. 34.8% of all households were made up of individuals, and 19.6% had someone living alone who was 65 years of age or older. The average household size was 2.14 and the average family size was 2.72.

The median age in the city was 48.9 years. 21.4% of residents were under the age of 18; 5.4% were between the ages of 18 and 24; 17.9% were from 25 to 44; 28.2% were from 45 to 64; and 27.1% were 65 years of age or older. The gender makeup of the city was 48.4% male and 51.6% female.

== Education ==
The community is served by Hoxie USD 412 public school district which includes Hoxie Junior-Senior High School and Hoxie Elementary School.

== Media ==
The Hoxie Sentinel was founded in 1884 as the Weekly Sentinel in the community of Kenneth, and was generally titled as The Hoxie Sentinel from 1886 to 2016. Hoxie's one weekly newspaper is now titled The Sheridan Sentinel after it was renamed when The Hoxie Sentinel changed owners in 2016.

== Notable people ==
- Les Barnhart, Major League Baseball player
- Nick Hague, NASA astronaut
- Alex M. Fromme, justice Kansas Supreme Court
- Jacie Hoyt, Oklahoma State University Women's Basketball Head Coach
- Dirk Johnson, professional football player, NFL
- Brad Lambert, Head Coach, Charlotte 49ers (Collegiate football)
- Urbane Pickering, Major League Baseball player
- Gordon Sloan, associate justice of the Oregon Supreme Court
- Erastus Turner, U.S. Representative from Kansas
