= Dresden, Kansas =

City in Decatur County, Kansas

- City
- Location within Decatur County and Kansas

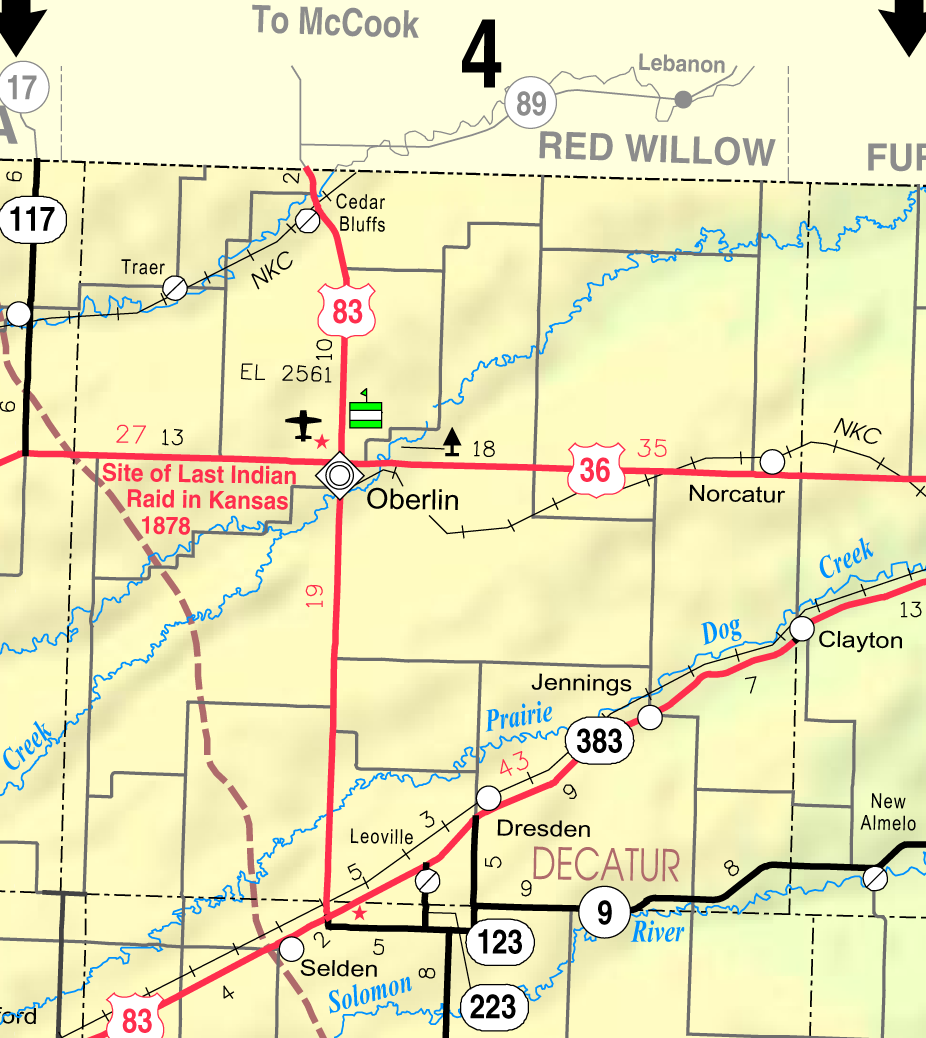
- KDOT map of Decatur County (legend)
- Coordinates: 39°37′20″N 100°25′17″W
- Country: United States
- State: Kansas
- County: Decatur
- Founded: 1888
- Incorporated: 1920
- Named for: Dresden, Germany

Area
  - Total: 0.90 sq mi (2.34 km^{2})
  - Land: 0.90 sq mi (2.34 km^{2})
  - Water: 0 sq mi (0.00 km^{2})
- Elevation: 2,733 ft (833 m)

Population (2020)
  - Total: 43
  - Density: 48/sq mi (18/km^{2})
- Time zone: UTC-6 (CST)
  - Summer (DST): UTC-5 (CDT)
- ZIP Code: 67635
- Area code: 785
- FIPS code: 20-18600
- GNIS ID: 471072

Dresden is a city in Decatur County, Kansas, United States. As of the 2020 census, the population of the city was 43.

== History ==
Dresden was founded in 1888. It was named by German settlers after the city of Dresden, Germany.

The first post office in Dresden was established in October 1888.

Dresden was a station on the Chicago, Rock Island and Pacific Railroad.

== Geography ==
Dresden is located at 39°37′20″N 100°25′17″W (39.622221, -100.421403). According to the United States Census Bureau, the city has a total area of 0.94 square miles (2.43 km^{2}), all land.

== Demographics ==
Historical population
| Census | Pop. | Note | %± |
|---|---|---|---|
| 1930 | 231 | | — |
| 1940 | 180 | | −22.1% |
| 1950 | 162 | | −10.0% |
| 1960 | 134 | | −17.3% |
| 1970 | 103 | | −23.1% |
| 1980 | 84 | | −18.4% |
| 1990 | 73 | | −13.1% |
| 2000 | 51 | | −30.1% |
| 2010 | 41 | | −19.6% |
| 2020 | 43 | | 4.9% |
U.S. Decennial Census

=== 2020 census ===
The 2020 United States census counted 43 people, 20 households, and 7 families in Dresden. The population density was 47.7 per square mile (18.4/km^{2}). There were 27 housing units at an average density of 29.9 per square mile (11.6/km^{2}). The racial makeup was 93.02% (40) white or European American (93.02% non-Hispanic white), 0.0% (0) black or African-American, 0.0% (0) Native American or Alaska Native, 0.0% (0) Asian, 0.0% (0) Pacific Islander or Native Hawaiian, 0.0% (0) from other races, and 6.98% (3) from two or more races. Hispanic or Latino of any race was 0.0% (0) of the population.

Of the 20 households, 5.0% had children under the age of 18; 25.0% were married couples living together; 45.0% had a female householder with no spouse or partner present. 55.0% of households consisted of individuals and 20.0% had someone living alone who was 65 years of age or older. The average household size was 3.1 and the average family size was 3.2.

27.9% of the population was under the age of 18, 2.3% from 18 to 24, 11.6% from 25 to 44, 30.2% from 45 to 64, and 27.9% who were 65 years of age or older. The median age was 53.5 years. For every 100 females, there were 115.0 males. For every 100 females ages 18 and older, there were 93.8 males.

The 2016–2020 5-year American Community Survey estimates show that the median family income was $52,083 (+/- $16,997). The median income for those above 16 years old was $31,250 (+/- $27,820).

=== 2010 census ===
As of the census of 2010, there were 41 people, 19 households, and 12 families living in the city. The population density was 43.6 inhabitants per square mile (16.8/km^{2}). There were 29 housing units at an average density of 30.9 per square mile (11.9/km^{2}). The racial makeup of the city was 100.0% White.

There were 19 households, of which 21.1% had children under the age of 18 living with them, 57.9% were married couples living together, 5.3% had a male householder with no wife present, and 36.8% were non-families. 31.6% of all households were made up of individuals, and 15.8% had someone living alone who was 65 years of age or older. The average household size was 2.16 and the average family size was 2.75.

The median age in the city was 49.8 years. 22% of residents were under the age of 18; 0.0% were between the ages of 18 and 24; 19.5% were from 25 to 44; 24.4% were from 45 to 64; and 34.1% were 65 years of age or older. The gender makeup of the city was 51.2% male and 48.8% female.

== Education ==
North of highway 383 is served by Oberlin USD 294 public school district, South of the highway is served by Hoxie USD 412.
