= Oberlin, Kansas =

City in Decatur County, Kansas, US

- City and County seat
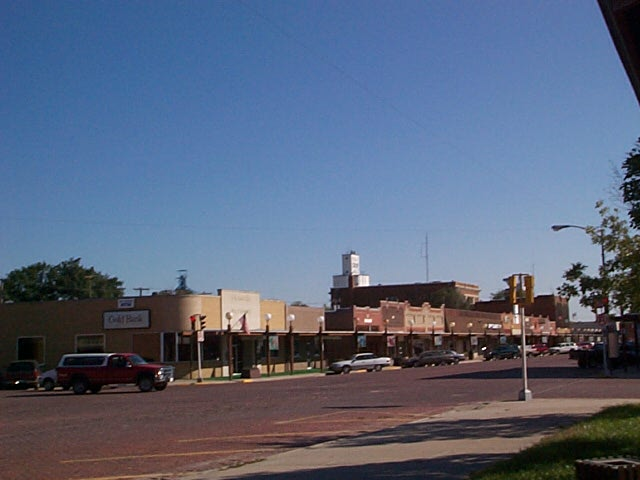
- Downtown Oberlin (1999)

- Location within Decatur County and Kansas

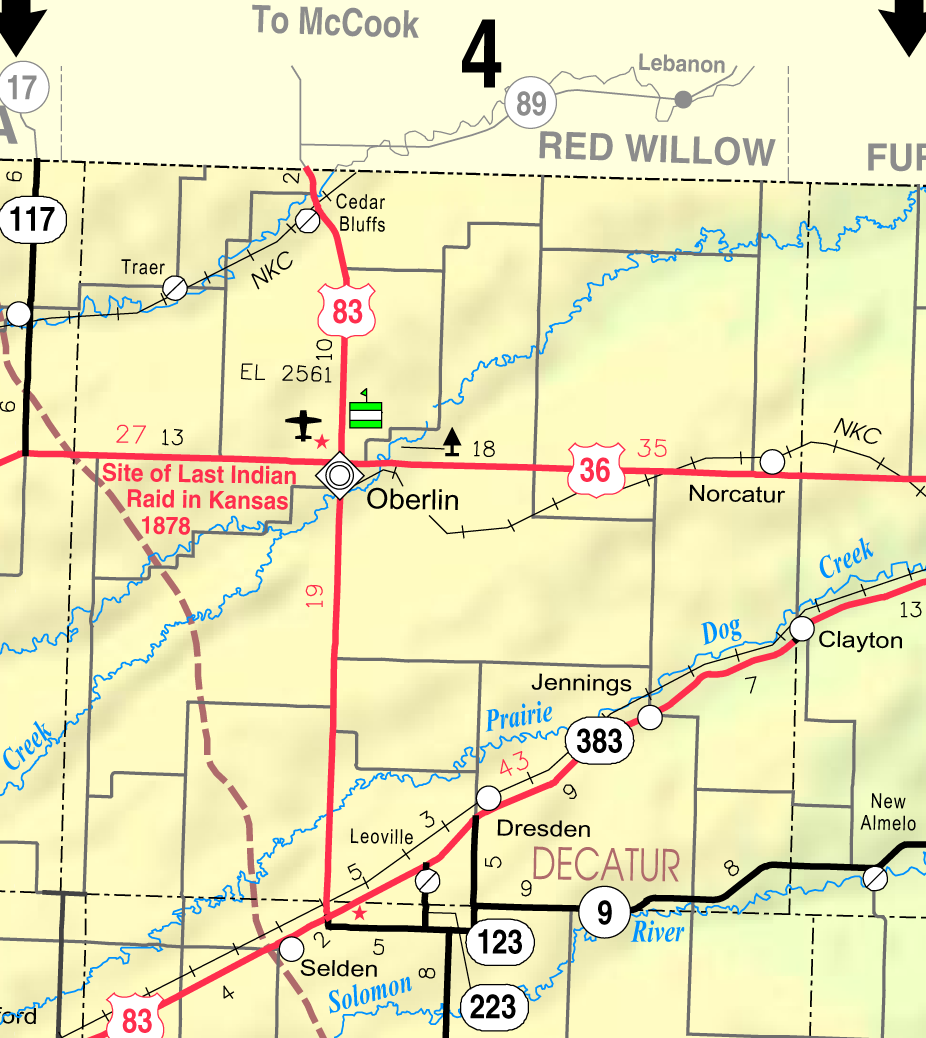
- KDOT map of Decatur County (legend)
- Coordinates: 39°49′23″N 100°31′51″W
- Country: United States
- State: Kansas
- County: Decatur
- Founded: 1872
- Platted: 1878
- Incorporated: 1885
- Named for: Oberlin, Ohio

Government
  - Mayor: Chris Kaiser
  - City Manager: David Sporn

Area
  - Total: 1.91 sq mi (4.95 km^{2})
  - Land: 1.91 sq mi (4.95 km^{2})
  - Water: 0 sq mi (0.00 km^{2})
- Elevation: 2,569 ft (783 m)

Population (2020)
  - Total: 1,644
  - Density: 860/sq mi (332/km^{2})
- Time zone: UTC-6 (CST)
  - Summer (DST): UTC-5 (CDT)
- ZIP Code: 67749
- Area code: 785
- FIPS code: 20-52000
- GNIS ID: 485632
- Website: oberlinkansas.gov

Oberlin is a city in and the county seat of Decatur County, Kansas, United States. As of the 2020 census, its population was 1,644.

== History ==
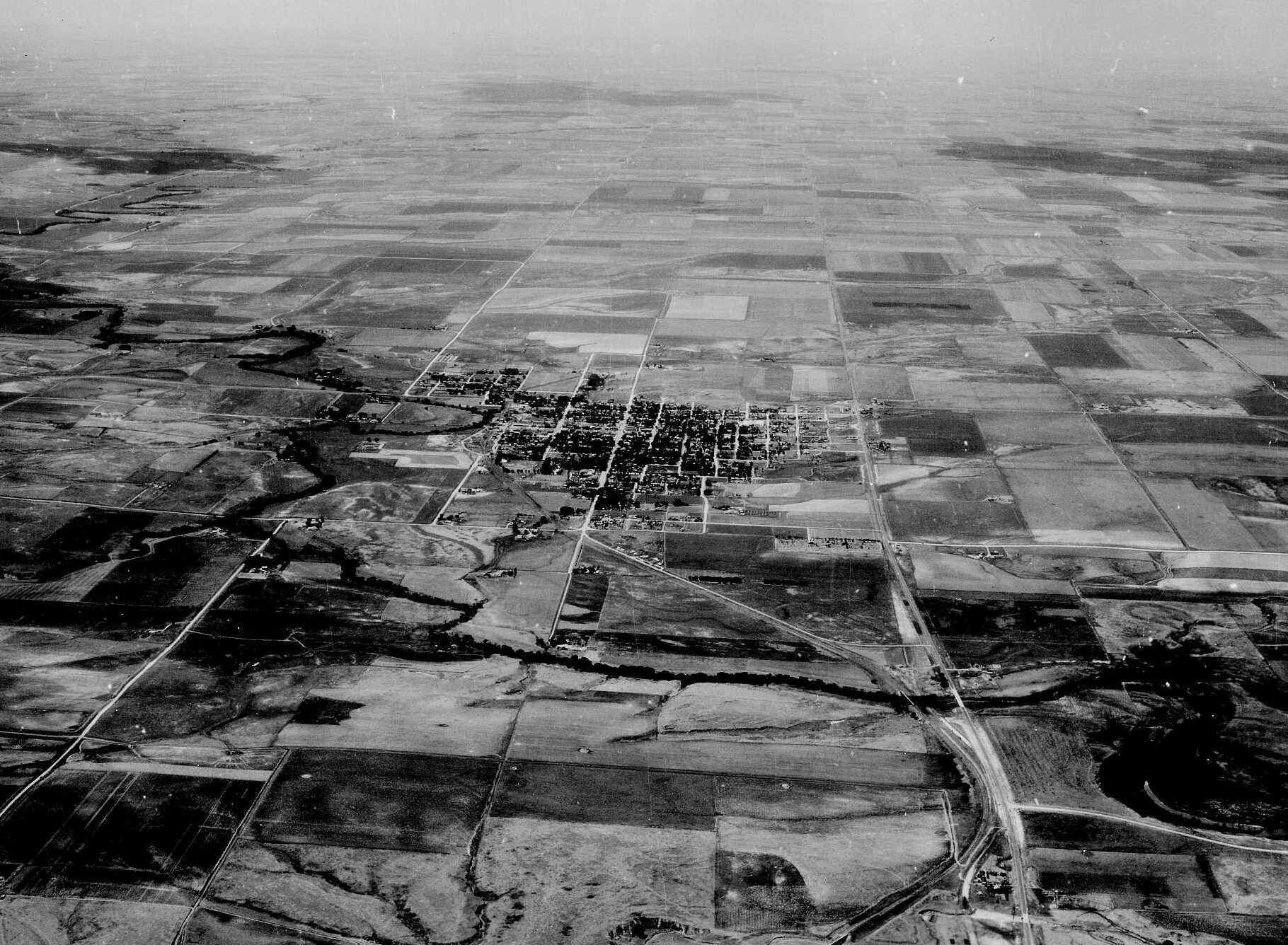
View of Oberlin, 1943

Oberlin was platted in 1878. It was named after Oberlin, Ohio. Its first post office was established in April, 1878, and the city was incorporated in 1885.

On September 30, 1878, Northern Cheyenne, fleeing from Indian Territory to their homes in the north during the Northern Cheyenne Exodus, attacked homesteaders near Oberlin, then a tiny hamlet. The raid's victims are commemorated in the "Last Indian Raid in Kansas" room of the Decatur County Museum, and by a monument in the town cemetery.

On April 29, 1942, an extremely violent tornado swept away three farms south of Oberlin, killing 15 people. Oberlin was spared from direct hit, as it passed 1 mi (1.6 km) east of city. This tornado was retrospectively rated F5 on the Fujita scale.

== Geography ==
Oberlin lies on the northwest side of Sappa Creek, a tributary of the Republican River, in the High Plains region of the Great Plains. Located at the intersection of U.S. routes 36 and 83 in northwestern Kansas, it is 228 miles (367 km) northwest of Wichita, 238 miles (383 km) east of Denver, and 320 miles (510 km) west-northwest of Kansas City.

According to the United States Census Bureau, it has a total area of 1.91 square miles (4.95 km^{2}), all land.

=== Climate ===
Oberlin has a humid continental climate (Köppen Dfa), with hot, dry summers and cold, dry winters. The hottest temperature recorded in Oberlin was 114 °F (45.6 °C) on July 24, 1936, while the coldest temperature recorded was −32 °F (−35.6 °C) on January 11, 1918.

Climate data for Oberlin, Kansas, 1991–2020 normals, extremes 1913–2021
Month	Jan	Feb	Mar	Apr	May	Jun	Jul	Aug	Sep	Oct	Nov	Dec	Year
Record high °F (°C)	78 (26)	85 (29)	93 (34)	97 (36)	103 (39)	111 (44)	114 (46)	110 (43)	107 (42)	99 (37)	88 (31)	83 (28)	114 (46)
Mean maximum °F (°C)	65.3 (18.5)	70.7 (21.5)	81.4 (27.4)	87.9 (31.1)	94.4 (34.7)	100.0 (37.8)	103.3 (39.6)	100.9 (38.3)	97.1 (36.2)	89.6 (32.0)	77.9 (25.5)	65.9 (18.8)	104.4 (40.2)
Mean daily maximum °F (°C)	41.7 (5.4)	44.9 (7.2)	56.1 (13.4)	64.6 (18.1)	74.1 (23.4)	85.9 (29.9)	90.9 (32.7)	88.7 (31.5)	80.9 (27.2)	67.6 (19.8)	53.9 (12.2)	42.6 (5.9)	66.0 (18.9)
Daily mean °F (°C)	28.8 (−1.8)	31.6 (−0.2)	41.3 (5.2)	50.3 (10.2)	60.4 (15.8)	72.1 (22.3)	77.4 (25.2)	75.1 (23.9)	66.2 (19.0)	52.6 (11.4)	39.6 (4.2)	29.8 (−1.2)	52.1 (11.2)
Mean daily minimum °F (°C)	15.8 (−9.0)	18.4 (−7.6)	26.4 (−3.1)	36.0 (2.2)	46.8 (8.2)	58.3 (14.6)	63.8 (17.7)	61.5 (16.4)	51.4 (10.8)	37.5 (3.1)	25.4 (−3.7)	17.0 (−8.3)	38.2 (3.4)
Mean minimum °F (°C)	−3.8 (−19.9)	−0.2 (−17.9)	7.9 (−13.4)	20.3 (−6.5)	30.9 (−0.6)	44.8 (7.1)	52.5 (11.4)	50.2 (10.1)	35.3 (1.8)	20.2 (−6.6)	8.4 (−13.1)	−1.9 (−18.8)	−9.9 (−23.3)
Record low °F (°C)	−32 (−36)	−28 (−33)	−25 (−32)	0 (−18)	22 (−6)	34 (1)	40 (4)	35 (2)	19 (−7)	2 (−17)	−19 (−28)	−31 (−35)	−32 (−36)
Average precipitation inches (mm)	0.42 (11)	0.68 (17)	1.03 (26)	2.13 (54)	3.30 (84)	3.01 (76)	3.27 (83)	3.07 (78)	1.72 (44)	1.69 (43)	0.80 (20)	0.67 (17)	21.79 (553)
Average snowfall inches (cm)	5.7 (14)	6.2 (16)	3.4 (8.6)	1.9 (4.8)	0.2 (0.51)	0.0 (0.0)	0.0 (0.0)	0.0 (0.0)	0.0 (0.0)	1.3 (3.3)	2.3 (5.8)	4.2 (11)	25.2 (64.01)
Average precipitation days (≥ 0.01 in)	3.0	3.7	5.1	6.7	9.6	9.0	8.7	8.8	6.1	5.6	3.6	3.1	73.0
Average snowy days (≥ 0.1 in)	1.9	2.8	1.7	0.8	0.1	0.0	0.0	0.0	0.0	0.3	1.1	2.2	10.9
Source 1: NOAA
Source 2: National Weather Service

== Demographics ==
Historical population
Census	Pop.	Note	%±
1890	976		—
1900	937		−4.0%
1910	1,157		23.5%
1920	1,247		7.8%
1930	1,629		30.6%
1940	1,878		15.3%
1950	2,019		7.5%
1960	2,337		15.8%
1970	2,291		−2.0%
1980	2,387		4.2%
1990	2,197		−8.0%
2000	1,994		−9.2%
2010	1,788		−10.3%
2020	1,644		−8.1%
U.S. Decennial Census

=== 2020 census ===
As of the 2020 census, Oberlin had a population of 1,644. The median age was 49.1 years. 20.4% of residents were under the age of 18 and 28.8% were 65 years of age or older. For every 100 females, there were 95.5 males, and for every 100 females age 18 and over, there were 92.4 males age 18 and over.

The population density was 860.7 per square mile (332.3/km^{2}). There were 970 housing units at an average density of 507.9 per square mile (196.1/km^{2}). There were 970 housing units, of which 20.5% were vacant. The homeowner vacancy rate was 5.4% and the rental vacancy rate was 16.2%.

0.0% of residents lived in urban areas, while 100.0% lived in rural areas.

There were 771 households and 428 families in Oberlin. Of households, 21.8% had children under the age of 18 living in them. Of all households, 43.5% were married-couple households, 23.1% were households with a male householder and no spouse or partner present, and 29.4% were households with a female householder and no spouse or partner present. About 41.7% of all households were made up of individuals and 21.8% had someone living alone who was 65 years of age or older. The average household size was 1.9 and the average family size was 2.7.

Racial composition as of the 2020 census
Race	Number	Percent
White	1,534	93.3%
Black or African American	7	0.4%
American Indian and Alaska Native	4	0.2%
Asian	6	0.4%
Native Hawaiian and Other Pacific Islander	0	0.0%
Some other race	6	0.4%
Two or more races	87	5.3%
Hispanic or Latino (of any race)	52	3.2%

Income and poverty

The 2016–2020 5-year American Community Survey estimates show that the median household income was $35,771 (with a margin of error of +/- $2,433) and the median family income was $52,150 (+/- $13,156). Males had a median income of $38,068 (+/- $5,006) versus $21,307 (+/- $7,424) for females. The median income for those above 16 years old was $32,617 (+/- $4,329). Approximately, 19.5% of families and 17.7% of the population were below the poverty line, including 27.1% of those under the age of 18 and 4.5% of those ages 65 or over.

Educational attainment

The percent of those with a bachelor's degree or higher was estimated to be 11.6% of the population.

=== 2010 census ===
As of the census of 2010, there were 1,788 people, 824 households, and 477 families residing in the city. The population density was 936.1 inhabitants per square mile (361.4/km^{2}). There were 1,046 housing units at an average density of 547.6 per square mile (211.4/km^{2}). The racial makeup of the city was 96.9% White, 0.7% African American, 0.7% Native American, 0.3% Asian, 0.4% from other races, and 1.0% from two or more races. Hispanic or Latino of any race were 1.0% of the population.

There were 824 households, of which 21.2% had children under the age of 18 living with them, 47.8% were married couples living together, 7.3% had a female householder with no husband present, 2.8% had a male householder with no wife present, and 42.1% were non-families. 39.6% of all households were made up of individuals, and 19.6% had someone living alone who was 65 years of age or older. The average household size was 2.07 and the average family size was 2.73.

The median age in the city was 52 years. 20% of residents were under the age of 18; 4.1% were between the ages of 18 and 24; 17.4% were from 25 to 44; 29% were from 45 to 64; and 29.5% were 65 years of age or older. The gender makeup of the city was 47.4% male and 52.6% female.

== Arts and culture ==
Oberlin is home to the Last Indian Raid Museum, which contains multiple late 19th and early 20th century buildings filled with artifacts chronicling the history of the area and early Plains settlers. Examples include a 1930s grocery store and a one-room schoolhouse built in 1922.

Its a recreation center, completed in 2010, includes a 3D-capable movie theater and a bowling alley.

The Oberlin Area Band is an intergenerational band that rehearses weekly and performs quarterly.

== Parks and recreation ==
The Oberlin City Park, near Decatur Community High School, and has a playground, picnic shelter, band shell, and full basketball court, and is home to the Oberlin swimming pool.

=== Sappa Park ===
The City of Oberlin is the owner of the Sappa Park two miles east of town. Formerly a state park, it has wetlands, bike and hiking paths, a nine-hole disc golf course, and a shelter house built by the Works Progress Administration in the 1930s. It is currently undergoing a multi-year improvement project. A nine-hole golf course is adjacent to it.

The park, originally by a lake, was developed in 1935 by the National Park Service. The Works Progress Administration (WPA) hired unemployed young men to build its dam and shelter house. It was dedicated in 1939, but over the years silt filled the lake and it was drained. Part of the lake has recently been restored as a wetlands.

== Government ==
Oberlin is a city of the third class, according to state statute, with a mayor-council form of government. The city council consists of five members and meets on the first and third Thursday of each month at 7PM.

== Education ==
The community is served by Oberlin USD 294 public school district, which operates two schools in the city: Oberlin Elementary School (Grades Pre-K-6) and Decatur Community Junior/Senior High School (7–12).

== Media ==
The Oberlin Herald is the city's sole newspaper, published weekly.

Two FM radio stations are licensed to and broadcast from Oberlin:

- K-LOVE (translator station K217CY), at 91.3 FM, playing a Christian Contemporary format

Oberlin is in the Wichita-Hutchinson, Kansas television market. NBC affiliate KSNK, licensed to McCook, Nebraska, broadcasts on channel 8 from studios west of Oberlin. It is a satellite station of KSNW in Wichita.

== Notable people ==
Notable people who were born in and/or have lived in Oberlin include:

- Brun Campbell – ragtime composer, pianist
- Sam Francis – #1 pick in 1937 NFL draft, football coach at Kansas State University standout fullback for Nebraska Cornhuskers
- Elmer Hackney – NFL running back
- Richard Rogers – U.S. federal judge
- Cora Simpson – nurse and nurse educator, founder of nursing school in Fuzhou, China
