= Adell Township, Kansas =

Township in Sheridan County, Kansas, U.S.

Adell Township
- Township
- Location within Sheridan County

- Location within Kansas
- Coordinates: 39°31′30″N 100°14′41″W
- Country: United States
- State: Kansas
- County: Sheridan
- Established: 1879

Area
  - Total: 53.997 sq mi (139.85 km^{2})
  - Land: 53.991 sq mi (139.84 km^{2})
  - Water: 0.006 sq mi (0.016 km^{2}) 0.01%
- Elevation: 2,654 ft (809 m)

Population (2020)
  - Total: 7
  - Density: 0.13/sq mi (0.050/km^{2})
- Time zone: UTC-6 (CST)
  - Summer (DST): UTC-5 (CDT)
- Area code: 785
- GNIS feature ID: 471111

Adell Township is a township in Sheridan County, Kansas, United States. As of the 2020 census, its population was 7.

== History ==
Adell Township was established in 1879. The first settler in what was to become Adell Township was a man named Abernathy, who settled there in 1872.

Adell Township is home to the ghost towns of Adell, Alcyone, Chicago, and Lucerne. The extinct town of Hortonville, whose post office was in operation from 1879 to 1880, is also located in the township.

== Geography ==
Adell Township covers an area of 53.997 square miles (139.85 square kilometers). The North Fork Solomon River flows through it.

=== Adjacent townships ===
Allison Township, Decatur County
Lyon Township, Decatur County	northwest	north	northeast	Highland-District 2 Township, Norton County
Union Township, Sheridan County	west	self	east	Allodium Township, Graham County
		south
Bowcreek Township, Sheridan County

== Transportation ==
=== Major highways ===
- K-9
