= Bayne, Kansas =

Bayne, Kansas, is the name of two former settlements:

- Bayne, Lincoln County, Kansas
- Bayne, Russell County, Kansas
