= Emley (disambiguation) =

Emley is a village in West Yorkshire, England.

Emley may also refer to:

- Emley, Kansas, United States
- Emley A.F.C., an association football club based in the West Yorkshire village
- Hundred of Elmbridge, Surrey, England
- Frank Emley (1861–1938), English architect
