= Sheridan County, Kansas =

County in Kansas, United States

- County
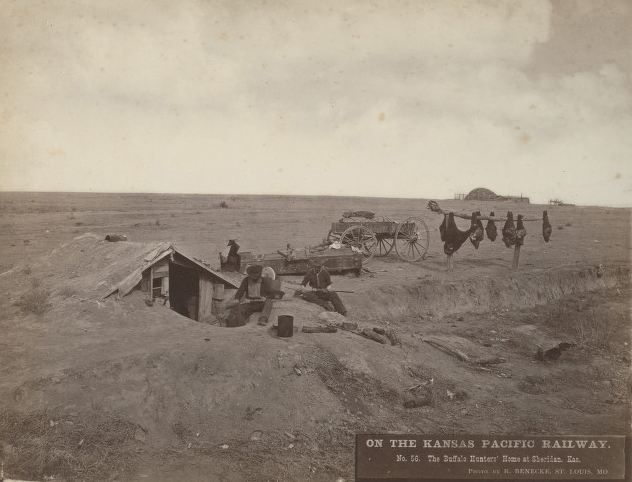
- Buffalo Hunters' Home in Sheridan (1873)

- Location within the U.S. state of Kansas
- Coordinates: 39°21′N 100°26′W
- Country: United States
- State: Kansas
- Founded: 1873
- Named for: Philip Sheridan
- Seat: Hoxie
- Largest city: Hoxie

Area
  - Total: 896 sq mi (2,320 km^{2})
  - Land: 896 sq mi (2,320 km^{2})
  - Water: 0.3 sq mi (0.78 km^{2}) 0.03%

Population (2020)
  - Total: 2,447
  - Estimate (2025): 2,427 ▼
  - Density: 2.7/sq mi (1.0/km^{2})
- Time zone: UTC−6 (Central)
  - Summer (DST): UTC−5 (CDT)
- Congressional district: 1st
- Website: County Website

Sheridan County is a county located in the U.S. state of Kansas. Its county seat is Hoxie. As of the 2020 census, the county population was 2,447. The county was named in honor of Philip Sheridan, a Union general during the Civil War.

== History ==
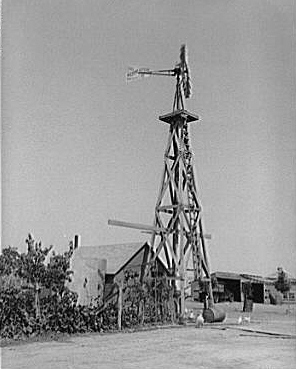
Windmill, Sheridan County, Kansas, 1939. Farm Security Administration photo by Russell Lee.

=== Early history ===
For many millennia, the Great Plains of North America was inhabited by nomadic Native Americans. From the 16th century to 18th century, the Kingdom of France claimed ownership of large parts of North America. In 1762, after the French and Indian War, France secretly ceded New France to Spain, per the Treaty of Fontainebleau.

=== 19th century ===
In 1802, Spain returned most of the land to France while keeping title to about 7,500 square miles. In 1803, most of the land for modern day Kansas was acquired by the United States from France as part of the 828,000 square miles Louisiana Purchase for 2.83 cents per acre.

In 1854, the Kansas Territory was organized, then in 1861 Kansas became the 34th U.S. state. In 1873, the remaining unorganized western part of the state was divided into 22 new counties, including Sheridan County. Sheridan County was then organized in 1880, with the county seat at Kenneth. After it became apparent in 1886, that the railroad line coming to the area would run south of Kenneth to the new town of Hoxie, the residents of Kenneth accepted an offer to get new lots in Hoxie (and move their buildings at no expense), and the county seat transferred to Hoxie. The Lincoln-Colorado railroad line opened through the county in 1888, and formally became part of the Union Pacific Railroad in the late 1890s.

=== 20th century ===
The population of Sheridan County grew in the early 20th century and peaked in 1930 at 6,038 residents. Since then the population has steadily declined, as part of the general depopulation of the Great Plains.

The rail line stayed in operation in Sheridan County until 1998. After flooding east of Plainville in the 1993 floods damaged the line, the railroad concluded it would not be cost effective to rebuild, and the entire line from Plainville to Colby was abandoned by 1998.

== Geography ==
According to the U.S. Census Bureau, the county has a total area of 896 square miles (2,320 km^{2}), of which 896 square miles (2,320 km^{2}) is land and 0.3 square miles (0.78 km^{2}) (0.03%) is water.

=== Adjacent counties ===
- Decatur County (north)
- Norton County (northeast)
- Graham County (east)
- Gove County (south)
- Thomas County (west)

== Demographics ==
Historical population
Census	Pop.	Note	%±
1880	1,567		—
1890	3,733		138.2%
1900	3,819		2.3%
1910	5,651		48.0%
1920	5,484		−3.0%
1930	6,038		10.1%
1940	5,312		−12.0%
1950	4,607		−13.3%
1960	4,267		−7.4%
1970	3,859		−9.6%
1980	3,544		−8.2%
1990	3,043		−14.1%
2000	2,813		−7.6%
2010	2,556		−9.1%
2020	2,447		−4.3%
2025 (est.)	2,427	▼	−0.8%
U.S. Decennial Census; 1790-1960 1900-1990; 1990-2000 2010-2020

=== 2020 census ===
As of the 2020 census, the county had a population of 2,447. The median age was 43.1 years. 24.8% of residents were under the age of 18 and 22.9% of residents were 65 years of age or older. For every 100 females there were 104.1 males, and for every 100 females age 18 and over there were 103.4 males age 18 and over.

The racial makeup of the county was 92.2% White, 0.1% Black or African American, 0.4% American Indian and Alaska Native, 0.5% Asian, 0.1% Native Hawaiian and Pacific Islander, 1.9% from some other race, and 4.7% from two or more races. Hispanic or Latino residents of any race comprised 5.9% of the population.

0.0% of residents lived in urban areas, while 100.0% lived in rural areas.

There were 1,020 households in the county, of which 30.6% had children under the age of 18 living with them and 21.0% had a female householder with no spouse or partner present. About 31.1% of all households were made up of individuals and 15.2% had someone living alone who was 65 years of age or older.

There were 1,152 housing units, of which 11.5% were vacant. Among occupied housing units, 72.6% were owner-occupied and 27.4% were renter-occupied. The homeowner vacancy rate was 0.7% and the rental vacancy rate was 7.7%.

=== 2000 census ===
As of the census of 2000, there were 2,813 people, 1,124 households, and 795 families residing in the county. The population density was 3 people per square mile (1.2 people/km^{2}). There were 1,263 housing units at an average density of 1 per square mile (0.39/km^{2}). The racial makeup of the county was 98.65% White, 0.14% Black or African American, 0.07% Native American, 0.07% Asian, 0.14% Pacific Islander, 0.36% from other races, and 0.57% from two or more races. 1.46% of the population were Hispanic or Latino of any race.

There were 1,124 households, out of which 30.40% had children under the age of 18 living with them, 63.80% were married couples living together, 4.50% had a female householder with no husband present, and 29.20% were non-families. 27.60% of all households were made up of individuals, and 14.80% had someone living alone who was 65 years of age or older. The average household size was 2.46 and the average family size was 3.01.

In the county, the population was spread out, with 26.30% under the age of 18, 5.80% from 18 to 24, 23.70% from 25 to 44, 23.90% from 45 to 64, and 20.30% who were 65 years of age or older. The median age was 42 years. For every 100 females there were 100.10 males. For every 100 females age 18 and over, there were 95.80 males.

The median income for a household in the county was $33,547, and the median income for a family was $38,292. Males had a median income of $26,351 versus $16,250 for females. The per capita income for the county was $16,299. About 12.00% of families and 15.70% of the population were below the poverty line, including 27.30% of those under age 18 and 5.50% of those age 65 or over.

== Government ==
=== Presidential elections ===
Presidential election results

United States presidential election results for Sheridan County, Kansas
Year	Republican		Democratic		Third party(ies)	
Year	No.	%	No.	%	No.	%
1888	623	61.99%	337	33.53%	45	4.48%
1892	325	41.09%	0	0.00%	466	58.91%
1896	282	40.46%	384	55.09%	31	4.45%
1900	445	46.31%	499	51.93%	17	1.77%
1904	607	57.92%	293	27.96%	148	14.12%
1908	639	48.89%	631	48.28%	37	2.83%
1912	195	18.19%	509	47.48%	368	34.33%
1916	760	37.49%	1,189	58.66%	78	3.85%
1920	1,194	69.54%	477	27.78%	46	2.68%
1924	1,320	59.11%	542	24.27%	371	16.61%
1928	1,450	60.52%	930	38.81%	16	0.67%
1932	878	32.43%	1,773	65.50%	56	2.07%
1936	1,007	40.26%	1,442	57.66%	52	2.08%
1940	1,492	62.06%	903	37.56%	9	0.37%
1944	1,342	66.87%	658	32.79%	7	0.35%
1948	1,097	52.69%	966	46.40%	19	0.91%
1952	1,581	73.88%	555	25.93%	4	0.19%
1956	1,324	67.41%	633	32.23%	7	0.36%
1960	1,047	51.93%	954	47.32%	15	0.74%
1964	808	43.75%	1,028	55.66%	11	0.60%
1968	1,002	58.36%	563	32.79%	152	8.85%
1972	1,134	64.40%	552	31.35%	75	4.26%
1976	838	49.15%	793	46.51%	74	4.34%
1980	1,202	71.00%	391	23.10%	100	5.91%
1984	1,274	73.86%	419	24.29%	32	1.86%
1988	901	57.90%	600	38.56%	55	3.53%
1992	739	45.17%	347	21.21%	550	33.62%
1996	1,053	74.15%	264	18.59%	103	7.25%
2000	1,132	76.02%	281	18.87%	76	5.10%
2004	1,144	81.37%	239	17.00%	23	1.64%
2008	1,108	80.52%	254	18.46%	14	1.02%
2012	1,154	85.99%	168	12.52%	20	1.49%
2016	1,197	87.12%	127	9.24%	50	3.64%
2020	1,282	88.72%	147	10.17%	16	1.11%
2024	1,229	89.51%	126	9.18%	18	1.31%

Sheridan County is overwhelmingly Republican. Since Michael Dukakis in the heavily drought-influenced 1988 election won almost 39 percent of the county's vote, no Democratic presidential candidate has topped 22 percent, and in 2016 Hillary Clinton’s share plummeted into single digits. This county was Republican presidential candidate Donald Trump's second strongest in the state in 2024, after Wallace County, which gave Trump over 90% of the vote.

=== Laws ===
Although the Kansas Constitution was amended in 1986 to allow the sale of alcoholic liquor by the individual drink with the approval of voters, Sheridan County has remained a prohibition, or "dry", county.

== Education ==
=== Unified school districts ===
- Hoxie USD 412

== Communities ==
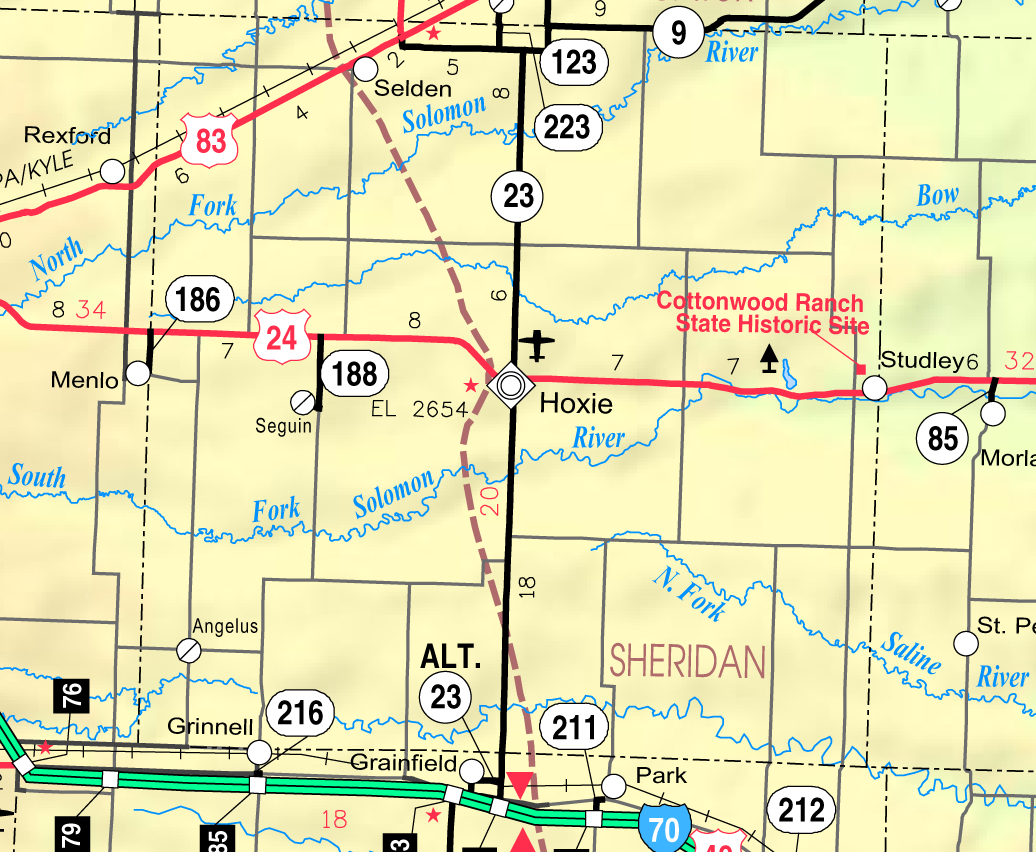
2005 map of Sheridan County (map legend)

List of townships / incorporated cities / unincorporated communities / extinct former communities within Sheridan County.

=== Cities ===
- Hoxie (county seat)
- Selden

=== Unincorporated communities ===
- Angelus
- Seguin
- Studley
- Tasco

=== Ghost towns ===
- Adell
- Alcyone
- Chicago
- Lucerne
- Museum
- Mystic
- Phelps
- Sheridan
- Ute
- Violenta

=== Townships ===
Sheridan County is divided into fourteen townships. None of the cities within the county are considered governmentally independent, and all figures for the townships include those of the cities. In the following table, the population center is the largest city (or cities) included in that township's population total, if it is of a significant size.

Sources: 2000 U.S. Gazetteer from the U.S. Census Bureau.
Township	FIPS	Population center	Population	Population density /km^{2} (/sq mi)	Land area km^{2} (sq mi)	Water area km^{2} (sq mi)	Water %	Geographic coordinates
Adell	00300		13	0 (0)	140 (54)	0 (0)	0.01%	39°30′58″N 100°14′13″W
Bloomfield	07450		45	0 (1)	93 (36)	0 (0)	0%	39°26′8″N 100°39′52″W
Bowcreek	08125		54	0 (1)	186 (72)	0 (0)	0%	39°25′48″N 100°17′2″W
East Saline	19675		66	0 (1)	186 (72)	0 (0)	0.03%	39°11′50″N 100°12′38″W
Kenneth	36525	Hoxie	1,430	15 (40)	93 (36)	0 (0)	0%	39°21′16″N 100°26′24″W
Logan	42225		115	1 (2)	187 (72)	0 (0)	0.04%	39°21′26″N 100°37′4″W
Parnell	54650		104	1 (1)	185 (71)	0 (0)	0.03%	39°25′33″N 100°30′57″W
Prairie Dog	57500		71	1 (2)	93 (36)	0 (0)	0.03%	39°31′27″N 100°40′15″W
Sheridan	64750		269	2 (5)	138 (53)	0 (0)	0.05%	39°31′40″N 100°32′38″W
Solomon	66400		248	1 (2)	279 (108)	0 (0)	0.04%	39°13′54″N 100°38′0″W
Springbrook	67350		108	0 (1)	279 (108)	0 (0)	0.01%	39°13′38″N 100°28′15″W
Union	72400		60	1 (2)	92 (36)	0 (0)	0%	39°31′52″N 100°22′35″W
Valley	73150		139	1 (2)	186 (72)	0 (0)	0.09%	39°21′0″N 100°16′5″W
West Saline	77375		91	0 (1)	186 (72)	0 (0)	0.02%	39°12′44″N 100°20′28″W

== See also ==
- Dry counties

Community information for Kansas

- Kansas locations by per capita income
- List of counties in Kansas
- List of townships in Kansas
- List of cities in Kansas
- List of unincorporated communities in Kansas
- List of ghost towns in Kansas
