= Ash Grove, Kansas =

Unincorporated community in Lincoln County, Kansas

Coordinates: 39°09′41″N 98°21′43″W

Ash Grove is an unincorporated community in Lincoln County, Kansas, United States. It is located approximately two miles east of K-181 (Kansas highway) along Ash Grove / Union Road.

== History ==
The community started when Civil War Veteran Napoleon Bonaparte Alley made his dugout there. A post office was opened in Ash Grove in 1916, and remained in operation until it was discontinued in 1944.

About 3.3 miles southwest of the old town of Ash Grove is the South Fork Spillman Creek Double Arch Bridge.

Currently it consists of two houses, abandoned church, abandoned school, and various other abandoned small buildings.

== Education ==
The community is served by Sylvan–Lucas USD 299 public school district.

== See also ==
- Grant, Kansas, a ghost town, a few miles south-east of Ash Grove next to railroad.
- Pottersburg, Kansas, a ghost town, a few miles south of Ash Grove.
