= Chicago, Kansas =

Ghost town in Sheridan County, Kansas

- Ghost town
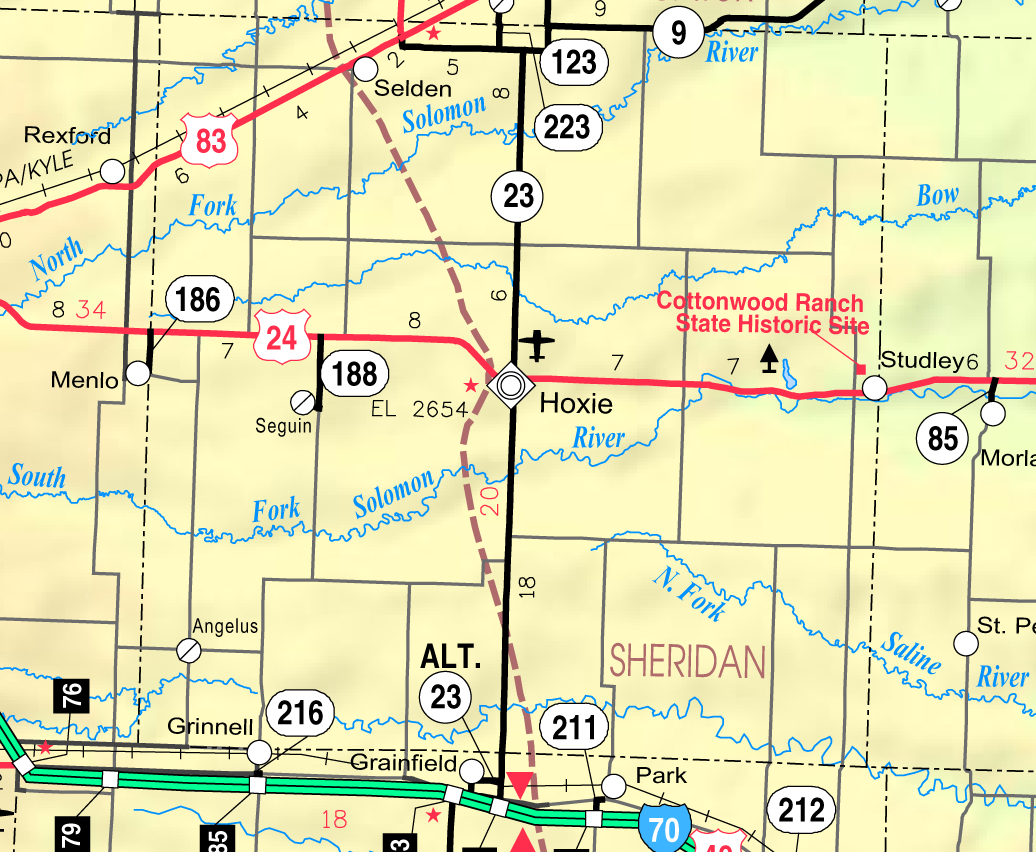
- KDOT map of Sheridan County (legend)

- Location within Kansas Location within the United States
- Coordinates: 39°29′00″N 100°15′23″W
- Country: United States
- State: Kansas
- County: Sheridan
- Township: Adell
- Named for: Chicago, Illinois
- Elevation: 2,657 ft (810 m)

Population
  - Total: 0
- Time zone: UTC-6 (CST)
  - Summer (DST): UTC-5 (CDT)
- Area code: 785
- GNIS ID: 482591

Chicago is a ghost town in Adell Township, Sheridan County, Kansas, United States.

== History ==
The community was named after Chicago, Illinois because it was the busiest place in the local area. A joint post office, stagecoach stop, and general store opened in 1880. The post office only lasted until 1887. A church built in 1910 lasted until the early 1960s, and the local school closed in 1954.

Currently, what remained of the community is an abandoned schoolhouse, a rusty "Chicago" sign marker, and the foundation of an abandoned home.
