= Lone Walnut, Kansas =

- Ghost town
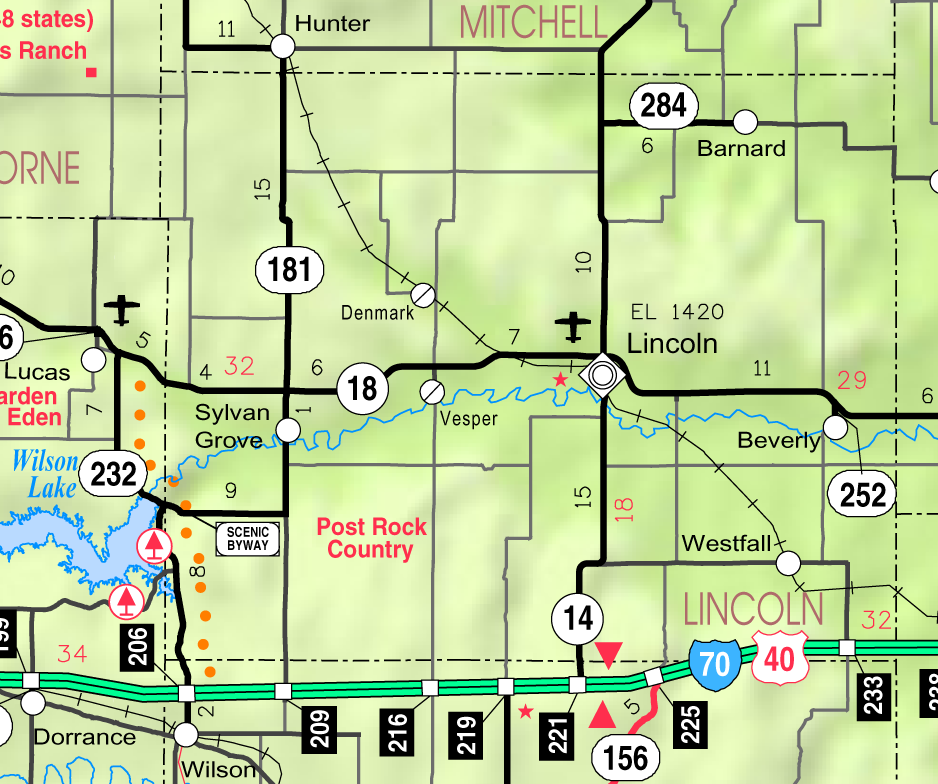
- KDOT map of Lincoln County (legend)

- Location within Kansas Location within the United States
- Coordinates: 38°53′07″N 98°12′56″W
- Country: United States
- State: Kansas
- County: Lincoln
- Elevation: 1,588 ft (484 m)

Population
  - Total: 0
- Time zone: UTC-6 (CST)
  - Summer (DST): UTC-5 (CDT)
- Area code: 785
- GNIS ID: 482327

Lone Walnut is a ghost town in Lincoln County, Kansas, United States.

== History ==
Lone Walnut was issued a post office in 1878. The post office was discontinued in 1900.
