= Sheridan, Kansas =

Ghost town in Sheridan County, Kansas

- Ghost town
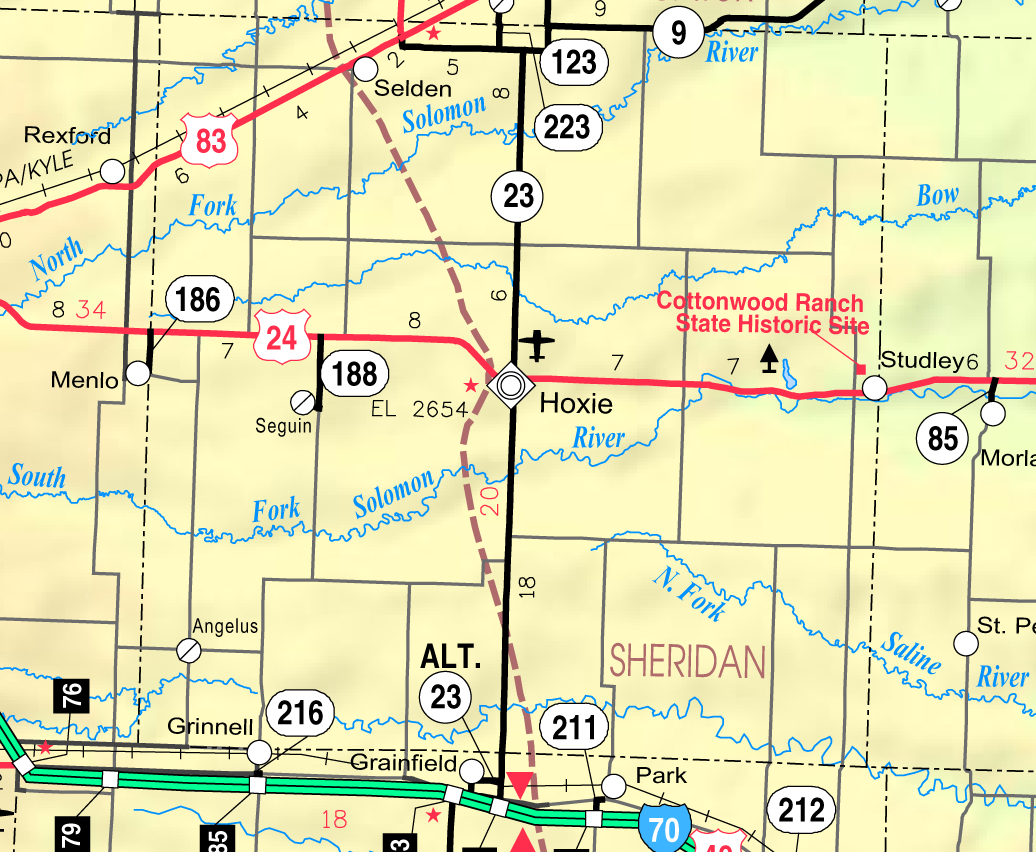
- KDOT map of Sheridan County (legend)

- Location within Kansas Location within the United States
- Coordinates: 39°30′33″N 100°29′52″W
- Country: United States
- State: Kansas
- County: Sheridan
- Elevation: 2,743 ft (836 m)

Population
  - Total: 0
- Time zone: UTC-6 (CST)
  - Summer (DST): UTC-5 (CDT)
- Area code: 785
- GNIS ID: 482587

Sheridan is a ghost town in Sheridan County, Kansas, United States.

== History ==
Sheridan was issued a post office in 1876. The post office was discontinued in 1888.

The Denver Extension of the Kansas Pacific Railroad was completed near Sheridan in 1868.

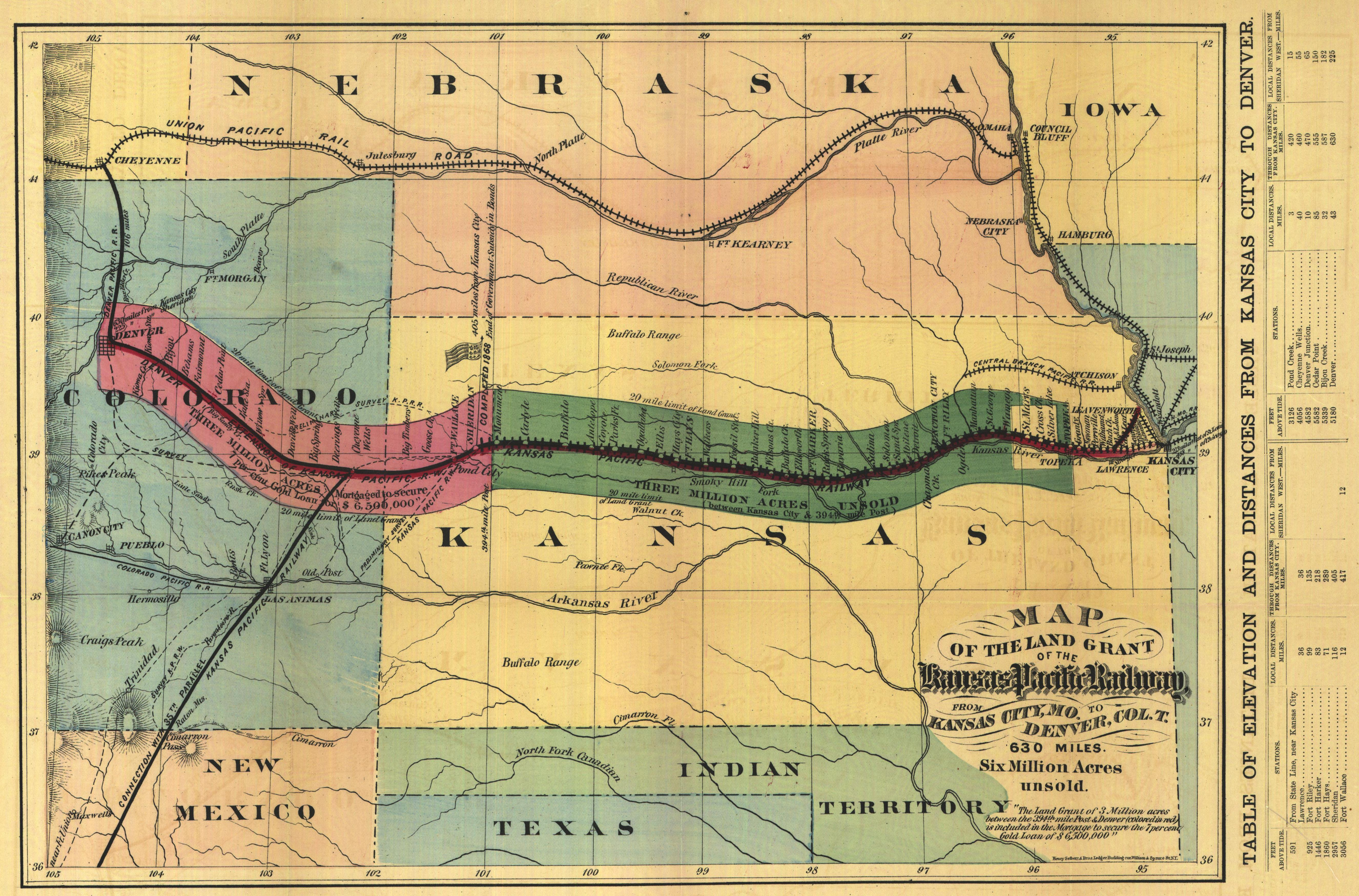
Kansas Pacific Railroad completes the Denver Extension
