= Lincoln County, Kansas =

County in Kansas, United States

- County
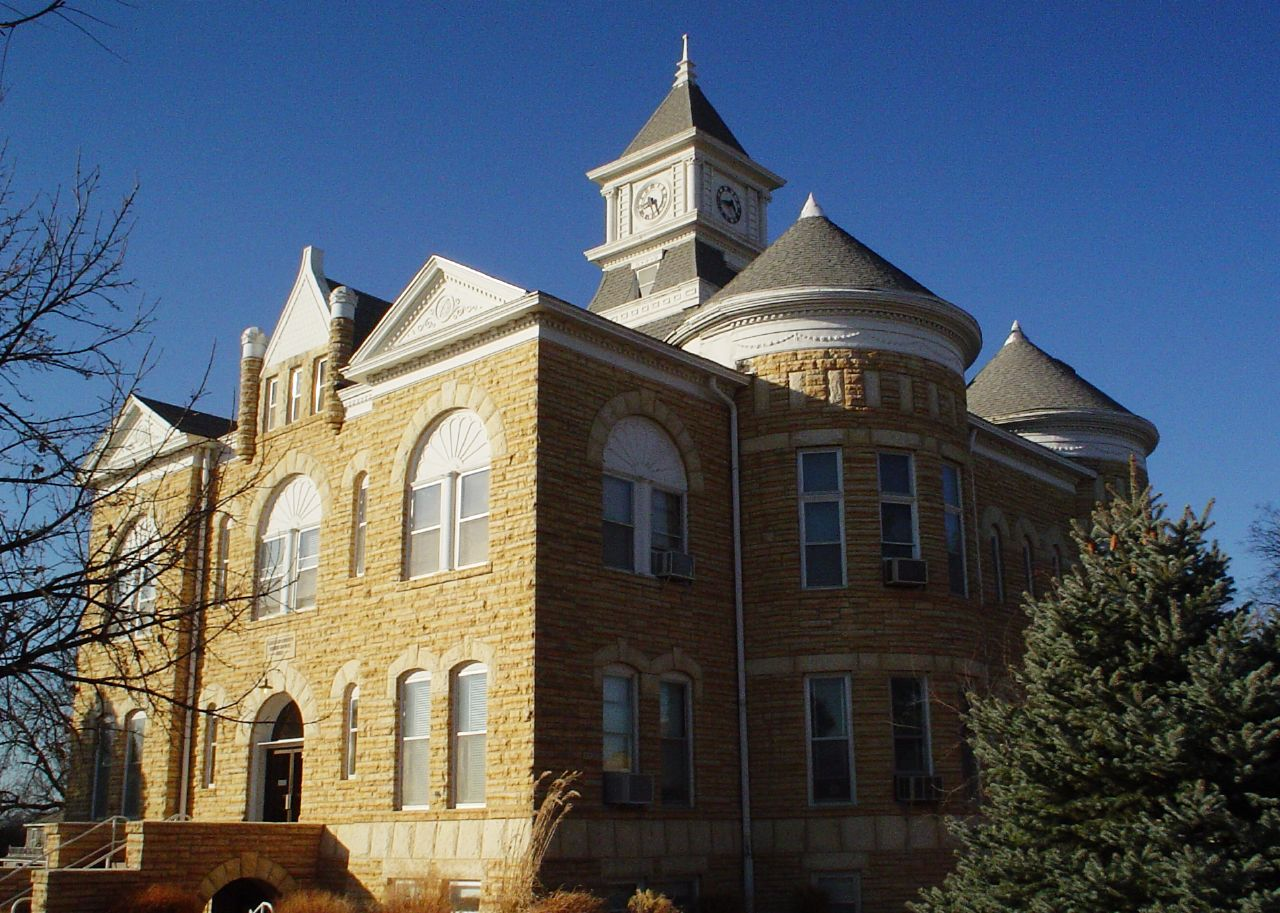
- Lincoln County Courthouse in Lincoln (2005)

- Location within the U.S. state of Kansas
- Coordinates: 39°03′N 98°12′W
- Country: United States
- State: Kansas
- Founded: February 26, 1867
- Named for: Abraham Lincoln
- Seat: Lincoln
- Largest city: Lincoln

Area
  - Total: 720 sq mi (1,900 km^{2})
  - Land: 719 sq mi (1,860 km^{2})
  - Water: 1.1 sq mi (2.8 km^{2}) 0.1%

Population (2020)
  - Total: 2,939
  - Estimate (2025): 2,861 ▼
  - Density: 4.09/sq mi (1.58/km^{2})
- Time zone: UTC−6 (Central)
  - Summer (DST): UTC−5 (CDT)
- Congressional district: 1st
- Website: ks497.cichosting.com/main/

Lincoln County is a county located in the U.S. state of Kansas. Its county seat and largest city is Lincoln Center. As of the 2020 census, the county population was 2,939. The county was named after Abraham Lincoln, the 16th president of the United States.

== History ==
For many millennia, the Great Plains of North America was inhabited by nomadic Native Americans. From the 16th century to 18th century, the Kingdom of France claimed ownership of large parts of North America. In 1762, after the French and Indian War, France secretly ceded New France to Spain, per the Treaty of Fontainebleau. In 1802, Spain returned most of the land to France, but keeping title to about 7,500 square miles. In 1803, most of the land for modern day Kansas was acquired by the United States from France as part of the 828,000 square mile Louisiana Purchase for 2.83 cents per acre.

In 1854, the Kansas Territory was organized, then in 1861 Kansas became the 34th U.S. state. In 1867, Lincoln County was established.

Lincoln County is among those in Kansas that are part of the depopulation of the Great Plains.

== Geography ==
According to the U.S. Census Bureau, the county has a total area of 720 square miles (1,900 km^{2}), of which 719 square miles (1,860 km^{2}) is land and 1.1 square miles (2.8 km^{2}) (0.1%) is water.

=== Adjacent counties ===
- Mitchell County (north)
- Ottawa County (east)
- Saline County (southeast)
- Ellsworth County (south)
- Russell County (west)
- Osborne County (northwest)

== Demographics ==
Historical population
| Census | Pop. | Note | %± |
|---|---|---|---|
| 1870 | 516 | | — |
| 1880 | 8,582 | | 1,563.2% |
| 1890 | 9,709 | | 13.1% |
| 1900 | 9,886 | | 1.8% |
| 1910 | 10,142 | | 2.6% |
| 1920 | 9,894 | | −2.4% |
| 1930 | 9,707 | | −1.9% |
| 1940 | 8,338 | | −14.1% |
| 1950 | 6,643 | | −20.3% |
| 1960 | 5,556 | | −16.4% |
| 1970 | 4,582 | | −17.5% |
| 1980 | 4,145 | | −9.5% |
| 1990 | 3,653 | | −11.9% |
| 2000 | 3,578 | | −2.1% |
| 2010 | 3,241 | | −9.4% |
| 2020 | 2,939 | | −9.3% |
| 2025 (est.) | 2,861 | ▼ | −2.7% |
U.S. Decennial Census; 1790-1960 1900-1990; 1990-2000 2010-2020

=== Racial and ethnic composition ===
Lincoln County, Kansas – Racial and ethnic composition Note: the US Census treats Hispanic/Latino as an ethnic category. This table excludes Latinos from the racial categories and assigns them to a separate category. Hispanics/Latinos may be of any race.
| Race / Ethnicity (NH = Non-Hispanic) | Pop 1980 | Pop 1990 | Pop 2000 | Pop 2010 | Pop 2020 | % 1980 | % 1990 | % 2000 | % 2010 | % 2020 |
|---|---|---|---|---|---|---|---|---|---|---|
| White alone (NH) | 4,104 | 3,624 | 3,491 | 3,116 | 2,691 | 99.01% | 99.21% | 97.57% | 96.14% | 91.56% |
| Black or African American alone (NH) | 0 | 1 | 4 | 8 | 6 | 0.00% | 0.03% | 0.11% | 0.25% | 0.20% |
| Native American or Alaska Native alone (NH) | 5 | 11 | 14 | 15 | 13 | 0.12% | 0.30% | 0.39% | 0.46% | 0.44% |
| Asian alone (NH) | 1 | 1 | 4 | 6 | 8 | 0.02% | 0.03% | 0.11% | 0.19% | 0.27% |
| Native Hawaiian or Pacific Islander alone (NH) | x | x | 0 | 0 | 0 | x | x | 0.00% | 0.00% | 0.00% |
| Other race alone (NH) | 6 | 1 | 3 | 1 | 12 | 0.14% | 0.03% | 0.08% | 0.03% | 0.41% |
| Mixed race or Multiracial (NH) | x | x | 25 | 23 | 79 | x | x | 0.70% | 0.71% | 2.69% |
| Hispanic or Latino (any race) | 29 | 15 | 37 | 72 | 130 | 0.70% | 0.41% | 1.03% | 2.22% | 4.42% |
| Total | 4,145 | 3,653 | 3,578 | 3,241 | 2,939 | 100.00% | 100.00% | 100.00% | 100.00% | 100.00% |

=== 2020 census ===
As of the 2020 census, the county had a population of 2,939. The median age was 47.2 years. 23.1% of residents were under the age of 18 and 26.2% of residents were 65 years of age or older. For every 100 females there were 101.6 males, and for every 100 females age 18 and over there were 94.9 males age 18 and over. 0.0% of residents lived in urban areas, while 100.0% lived in rural areas.

The racial makeup of the county was 93.2% White, 0.3% Black or African American, 0.5% American Indian and Alaska Native, 0.3% Asian, 0.0% Native Hawaiian and Pacific Islander, 1.6% from some other race, and 4.0% from two or more races. Hispanic or Latino residents of any race comprised 4.4% of the population.

There were 1,291 households in the county, of which 25.6% had children under the age of 18 living with them and 25.3% had a female householder with no spouse or partner present. About 33.4% of all households were made up of individuals and 17.5% had someone living alone who was 65 years of age or older.

There were 1,672 housing units, of which 22.8% were vacant. Among occupied housing units, 78.9% were owner-occupied and 21.1% were renter-occupied. The homeowner vacancy rate was 2.1% and the rental vacancy rate was 13.1%.

=== 2000 census ===
As of the census of 2000, there were 3,578 people, 1,529 households, and 1,039 families residing in the county. The population density was 5 people per square mile (1.9 people/km^{2}). There were 1,853 housing units at an average density of 3 per square mile (1.2/km^{2}). The racial makeup of the county was 98.30% White, 0.11% Black or African American, 0.48% Native American, 0.11% Asian, 0.25% from other races, and 0.75% from two or more races. 1.03% of the population were Hispanic or Latino of any race.

There were 1,529 households, out of which 27.10% had children under the age of 18 living with them, 58.10% were married couples living together, 6.40% had a female householder with no husband present, and 32.00% were non-families. 29.60% of all households were made up of individuals, and 16.40% had someone living alone who was 65 years of age or older. The average household size was 2.29 and the average family size was 2.81.

In the county, the population was spread out, with 23.50% under the age of 18, 5.50% from 18 to 24, 22.90% from 25 to 44, 24.60% from 45 to 64, and 23.50% who were 65 years of age or older. The median age was 44 years. For every 100 females there were 96.20 males. For every 100 females age 18 and over, there were 92.40 males.

The median income for a household in the county was $30,893, and the median income for a family was $36,538. Males had a median income of $24,681 versus $20,000 for females. The per capita income for the county was $15,788. About 7.30% of families and 9.70% of the population were below the poverty line, including 11.70% of those under age 18 and 10.00% of those age 65 or over.

== Government ==
=== Presidential elections ===
In common with other rural areas of the Great Plains states, Lincoln County votes predominantly Republican. Lyndon B. Johnson was the last Democrat to lose the county by less than 5%, and the last Democrat to win the county was Franklin D. Roosevelt in 1936.

Presidential election results

United States presidential election results for Lincoln County, Kansas
| Year | Republican | | Democratic | | Third party(ies) | |
| Year | No. | % | No. | % | No. | % |
|---|---|---|---|---|---|---|
| 1888 | 1,069 | 50.19% | 617 | 28.97% | 444 | 20.85% |
| 1892 | 878 | 39.18% | 0 | 0.00% | 1,363 | 60.82% |
| 1896 | 787 | 35.89% | 1,385 | 63.16% | 21 | 0.96% |
| 1900 | 1,110 | 46.44% | 1,250 | 52.30% | 30 | 1.26% |
| 1904 | 1,516 | 67.86% | 613 | 27.44% | 105 | 4.70% |
| 1908 | 1,218 | 50.27% | 1,117 | 46.10% | 88 | 3.63% |
| 1912 | 381 | 15.69% | 1,091 | 44.93% | 956 | 39.37% |
| 1916 | 1,716 | 43.55% | 2,106 | 53.45% | 118 | 2.99% |
| 1920 | 2,298 | 69.51% | 935 | 28.28% | 73 | 2.21% |
| 1924 | 2,277 | 59.41% | 615 | 16.04% | 941 | 24.55% |
| 1928 | 2,655 | 73.12% | 953 | 26.25% | 23 | 0.63% |
| 1932 | 1,653 | 40.80% | 2,297 | 56.70% | 101 | 2.49% |
| 1936 | 2,001 | 47.42% | 2,209 | 52.35% | 10 | 0.24% |
| 1940 | 2,822 | 67.69% | 1,301 | 31.21% | 46 | 1.10% |
| 1944 | 2,405 | 72.03% | 910 | 27.25% | 24 | 0.72% |
| 1948 | 2,181 | 65.73% | 1,094 | 32.97% | 43 | 1.30% |
| 1952 | 2,841 | 84.63% | 507 | 15.10% | 9 | 0.27% |
| 1956 | 2,219 | 76.20% | 681 | 23.39% | 12 | 0.41% |
| 1960 | 2,052 | 71.15% | 822 | 28.50% | 10 | 0.35% |
| 1964 | 1,373 | 50.80% | 1,316 | 48.69% | 14 | 0.52% |
| 1968 | 1,721 | 68.16% | 583 | 23.09% | 221 | 8.75% |
| 1972 | 1,649 | 75.57% | 476 | 21.81% | 57 | 2.61% |
| 1976 | 1,225 | 54.52% | 985 | 43.84% | 37 | 1.65% |
| 1980 | 1,685 | 72.16% | 528 | 22.61% | 122 | 5.22% |
| 1984 | 1,723 | 75.14% | 551 | 24.03% | 19 | 0.83% |
| 1988 | 1,229 | 59.66% | 796 | 38.64% | 35 | 1.70% |
| 1992 | 893 | 41.11% | 612 | 28.18% | 667 | 30.71% |
| 1996 | 1,372 | 64.47% | 528 | 24.81% | 228 | 10.71% |
| 2000 | 1,295 | 68.52% | 469 | 24.81% | 126 | 6.67% |
| 2004 | 1,368 | 76.00% | 391 | 21.72% | 41 | 2.28% |
| 2008 | 1,204 | 75.91% | 347 | 21.88% | 35 | 2.21% |
| 2012 | 1,165 | 78.56% | 289 | 19.49% | 29 | 1.96% |
| 2016 | 1,179 | 80.53% | 215 | 14.69% | 70 | 4.78% |
| 2020 | 1,283 | 81.25% | 266 | 16.85% | 30 | 1.90% |
| 2024 | 1,233 | 81.82% | 250 | 16.59% | 24 | 1.59% |

=== Laws ===
Following amendment to the Kansas Constitution in 1986, the county remained a prohibition, or "dry", county until 1990, when voters approved the sale of alcoholic liquor by the individual drink with a 30% food sales requirement.

== Education ==
=== Unified school districts ===
- Lincoln USD 298
- Sylvan–Lucas USD 299

== Communities ==
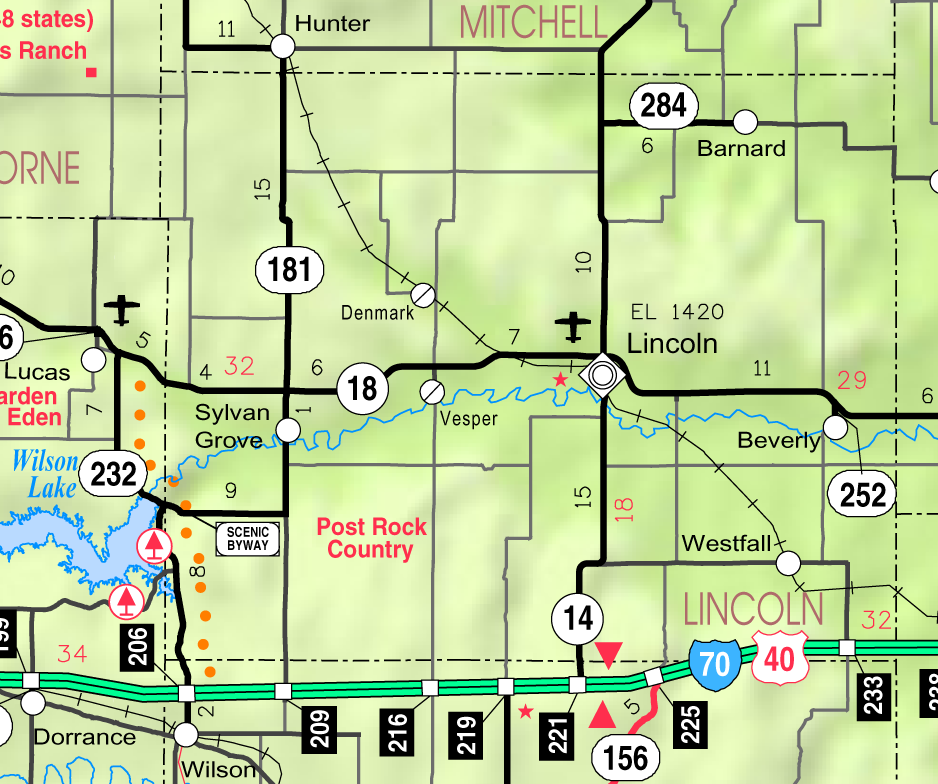
2005 map of Lincoln County (map legend)

List of townships, incorporated cities, unincorporated communities, and extinct former communities within Lincoln County:

=== Cities ===
- Barnard
- Beverly
- Lincoln Center (county seat)
- Sylvan Grove

=== Unincorporated communities ===
- Ash Grove
- Denmark
- Shady Bend
- Vesper
- Westfall

=== Ghost towns ===
- Bacon
- Bayne
- Cedron
- Herman
- Lone Walnut
- Milo
- Monroe
- Orbitello
- Orworth
- Paris
- Pinon
- Pleasant Valley
- Pottersburg
- Rosette
- Topsy
- Towerspring
- Union Valley
- Woodey
- Yorktown

=== Townships ===
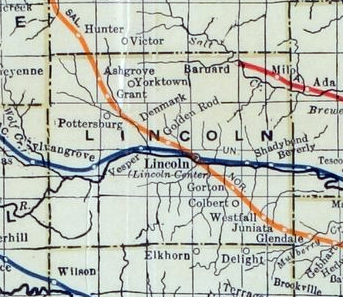
1915-1918 Railroad Map of Lincoln County

Lincoln County is divided into twenty townships. None of the cities within the county are considered governmentally independent, and all figures for the townships include those of the cities. In the following table, the population center is the largest city (or cities) included in that township's population total, if it is of a significant size.

Sources: 2000 U.S. Gazetteer from the U.S. Census Bureau.
| Township | FIPS | Population center | Population | Population density /km^{2} (/sq mi) | Land area km^{2} (sq mi) | Water area km^{2} (sq mi) | Water % | Geographic coordinates |
|---|---|---|---|---|---|---|---|---|
| Battle Creek | 04525 | | 51 | 1 (1) | 93 (36) | 0 (0) | 0.37% | 39°10′7″N 98°13′9″W |
| Beaver | 05075 | | 454 | 5 (13) | 93 (36) | 0 (0) | 0.03% | 39°4′12″N 98°8′48″W |
| Cedron | 11500 | | 47 | 1 (1) | 94 (36) | 0 (0) | 0.08% | 39°10′34″N 98°25′57″W |
| Colorado | 15000 | | 340 | 4 (9) | 93 (36) | 0 (0) | 0.02% | 39°0′52″N 97°58′57″W |
| Elkhorn | 20375 | | 927 | 10 (26) | 93 (36) | 0 (0) | 0.02% | 39°1′36″N 98°7′10″W |
| Franklin | 24425 | | 80 | 1 (2) | 93 (36) | 0 (0) | 0.17% | 38°55′47″N 98°5′44″W |
| Golden Belt | 26800 | | 67 | 1 (2) | 93 (36) | 0 (0) | 0.07% | 38°55′30″N 98°18′32″W |
| Grant | 27750 | | 91 | 1 (3) | 94 (36) | 0 (0) | 0.03% | 39°5′21″N 98°18′58″W |
| Hanover | 29850 | | 43 | 0 (1) | 93 (36) | 0 (0) | 0.10% | 39°5′45″N 98°25′11″W |
| Highland | 31950 | | 65 | 1 (2) | 92 (36) | 1 (0) | 0.64% | 38°54′45″N 98°26′27″W |
| Indiana | 34025 | | 206 | 2 (6) | 93 (36) | 0 (0) | 0.06% | 39°0′31″N 98°11′52″W |
| Logan | 41925 | | 67 | 1 (2) | 92 (36) | 0 (0) | 0.33% | 39°4′31″N 97°58′14″W |
| Madison | 44100 | | 96 | 1 (3) | 92 (36) | 0 (0) | 0.35% | 38°54′40″N 97°59′27″W |
| Marion | 44725 | | 103 | 1 (3) | 92 (35) | 0 (0) | 0.10% | 39°4′27″N 98°13′8″W |
| Orange | 52950 | | 68 | 1 (2) | 93 (36) | 0 (0) | 0.14% | 39°10′7″N 98°19′51″W |
| Pleasant | 56275 | | 482 | 5 (13) | 93 (36) | 0 (0) | 0.01% | 39°0′13″N 98°25′13″W |
| Salt Creek | 62800 | | 61 | 1 (2) | 93 (36) | 0 (0) | 0.04% | 39°11′6″N 97°59′36″W |
| Scott | 63525 | | 158 | 2 (4) | 93 (36) | 0 (0) | 0.12% | 39°10′51″N 98°4′11″W |
| Valley | 72900 | | 69 | 1 (2) | 93 (36) | 0 (0) | 0.26% | 38°56′10″N 98°12′45″W |
| Vesper | 73650 | | 103 | 1 (3) | 95 (37) | 0 (0) | 0.04% | 39°0′13″N 98°17′49″W |

== See also ==
- National Register of Historic Places listings in Lincoln County, Kansas

Community information for Kansas

- Kansas locations by per capita income
- List of counties in Kansas
- List of townships in Kansas
- List of cities in Kansas
- List of unincorporated communities in Kansas
- List of ghost towns in Kansas
