= Deliverance, Kansas =

- Ghost town
- Location within Kansas Location within the United States
- Coordinates: 39°20′10″N 99°01′06″W
- Country: United States
- State: Kansas
- County: Osborne
- Elevation: 1,939 ft (591 m)

Population
  - Total: 0
- Time zone: UTC-6 (CST)
  - Summer (DST): UTC-5 (CDT)
- Area code: 785

Deliverance is a ghost town in Mount Ayr Township, Osborne County, Kansas, United States.

== History ==
Initially named Pleasant Plain, the community was first located near the head of Little Medicine Creek. Pleasant Plain was issued a post office in 1878. The post office name was changed to Deliverance in 1894, then discontinued in 1904. The population in 1910 was 20.
