= Monroe, Kansas =

- Ghost town
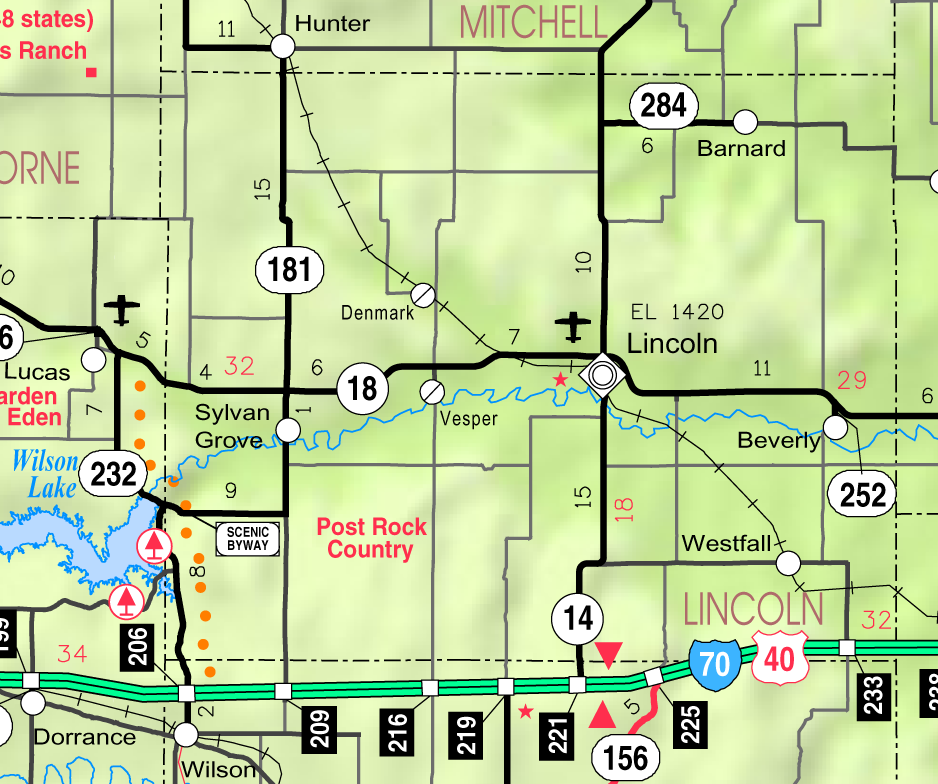
- KDOT map of Lincoln County (legend)

- Location within Kansas Location within the United States
- Coordinates: 38°59′13″N 97°59′01″W
- Country: United States
- State: Kansas
- County: Lincoln
- Elevation: 1,335 ft (407 m)

Population
  - Total: 0
- Time zone: UTC-6 (CST)
  - Summer (DST): UTC-5 (CDT)
- Area code: 785
- GNIS ID: 482325

Monroe is a ghost town in Lincoln County, Kansas, United States. It was located south of Beverly, near the intersection of Iron Drive and 280th Road.

== History ==
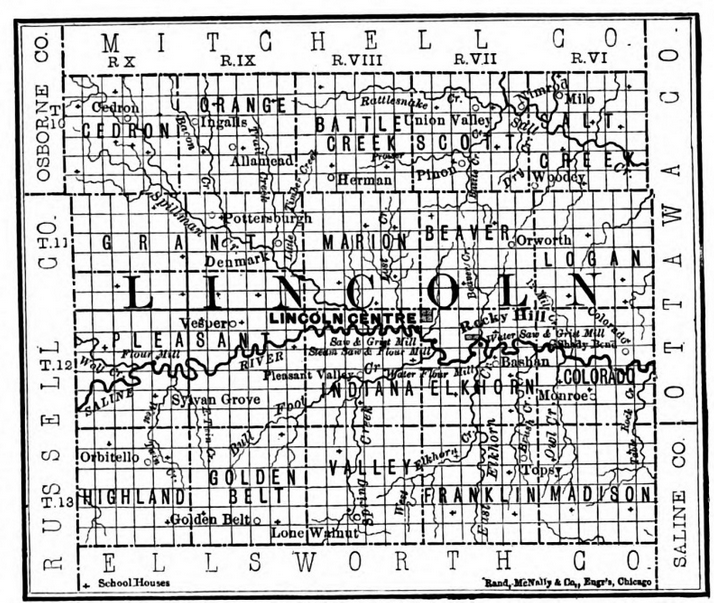
1883 map of Lincoln County, Monroe is labeled within Colorado Township in bottom right quadrant

Lincoln County was established in 1867, and organized in 1870. Monroe was issued a post office in December 1871. The post office was discontinued in 1886. In 1873, a Salina newspaper described Monroe as one of a few "post offices in the centre of industrious settlements" in Lincoln County. (1 December 1873). The county commissioners approved the creation of a Monroe township in 1873, carved out from Salt Creek and Elkhorn townships. The township must have had a very brief existence, as it does not appear on an 1878 county map.

The 1887 Official State Atlas of Kansas lists the names of six Lincoln County residents as living in Monroe. Local papers in this era would regularly report of happenings in Monroe.

The first public school in Lincoln County opened at Monroe in 1870. Though it was the first district organized in the county in 1873, it was registered second and thus became "No. 2". The first school house at Monroe was blown away in a storm in 1883 and then rebuilt, opening that fall with 45 students. As enrollment dropped the school was closed in 1939, and the students then sent to Beverly. The building was sold at public action in 1950. Many community events in Monroe would be held at the school house while it was in use.

Nothing remains of the community today except the nearby Monroe Cemetery.
