= Yorktown, Kansas =

- Ghost town
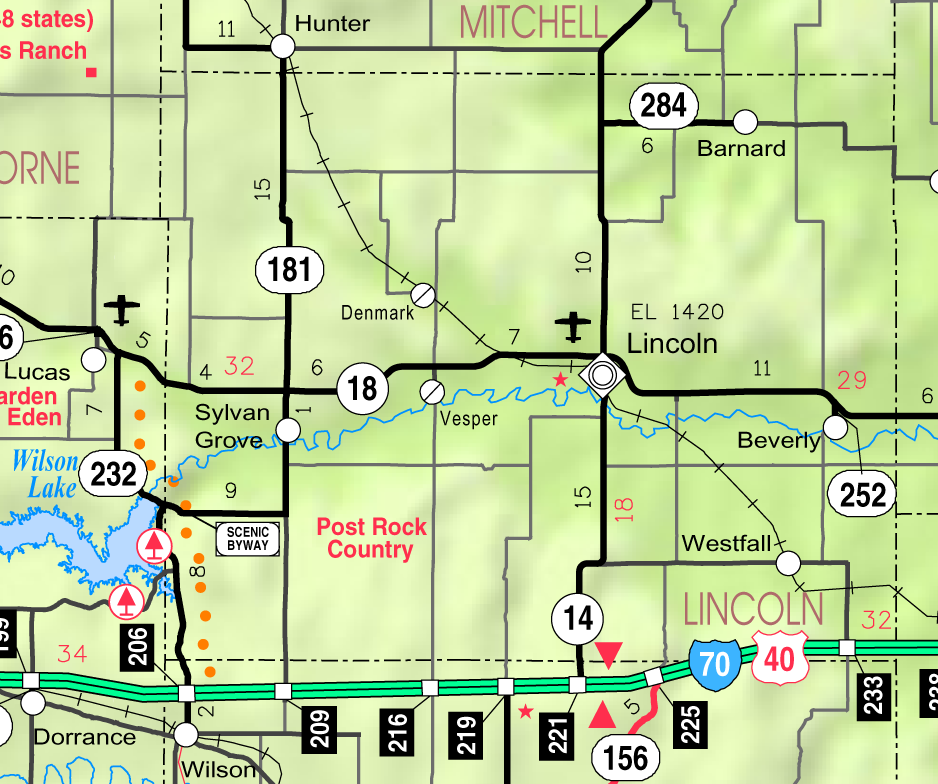
- KDOT map of Lincoln County (legend)

- Location within Kansas Location within the United States
- Coordinates: 39°10′35″N 98°19′19″W
- Country: United States
- State: Kansas
- County: Lincoln
- Elevation: 1,585 ft (483 m)

Population
  - Total: 0
- Time zone: UTC-6 (CST)
  - Summer (DST): UTC-5 (CDT)
- Area code: 785
- GNIS ID: 482317

Yorktown (initially Allamead) is a ghost town in Lincoln County, Kansas, United States.

== History ==
Allamead was issued a post office in 1880. The post office was renamed Yorktown in 1894, then discontinued in 1906.
