= Bacon, Kansas =

- Ghost town
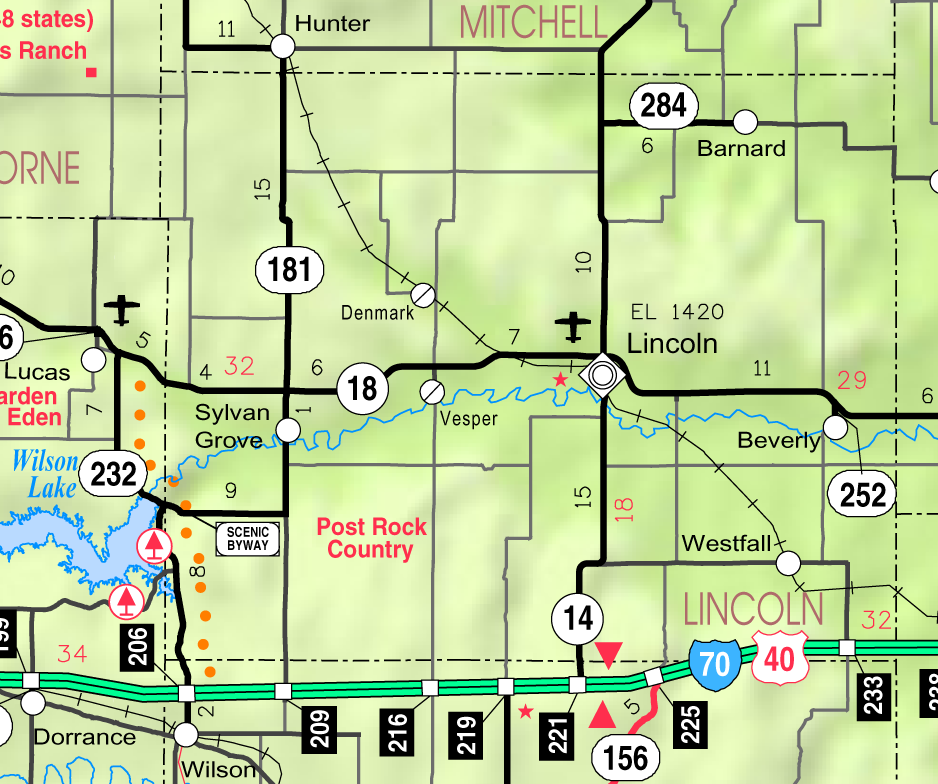
- KDOT map of Lincoln County (legend)

- Location within Kansas Location within the United States
- Coordinates: 39°08′00″N 98°27′06″W
- Country: United States
- State: Kansas
- County: Lincoln
- Elevation: 1,565 ft (477 m)

Population
  - Total: 0
- Time zone: UTC-6 (CST)
  - Summer (DST): UTC-5 (CDT)
- Area code: 785
- GNIS ID: 482315

Bacon is a ghost town in Lincoln County, Kansas, United States.

== History ==
Bacon was issued a post office in 1879. The post office was discontinued in 1902.
