= Mystic, Kansas =

Ghost town in Sheridan County, Kansas

- Ghost town
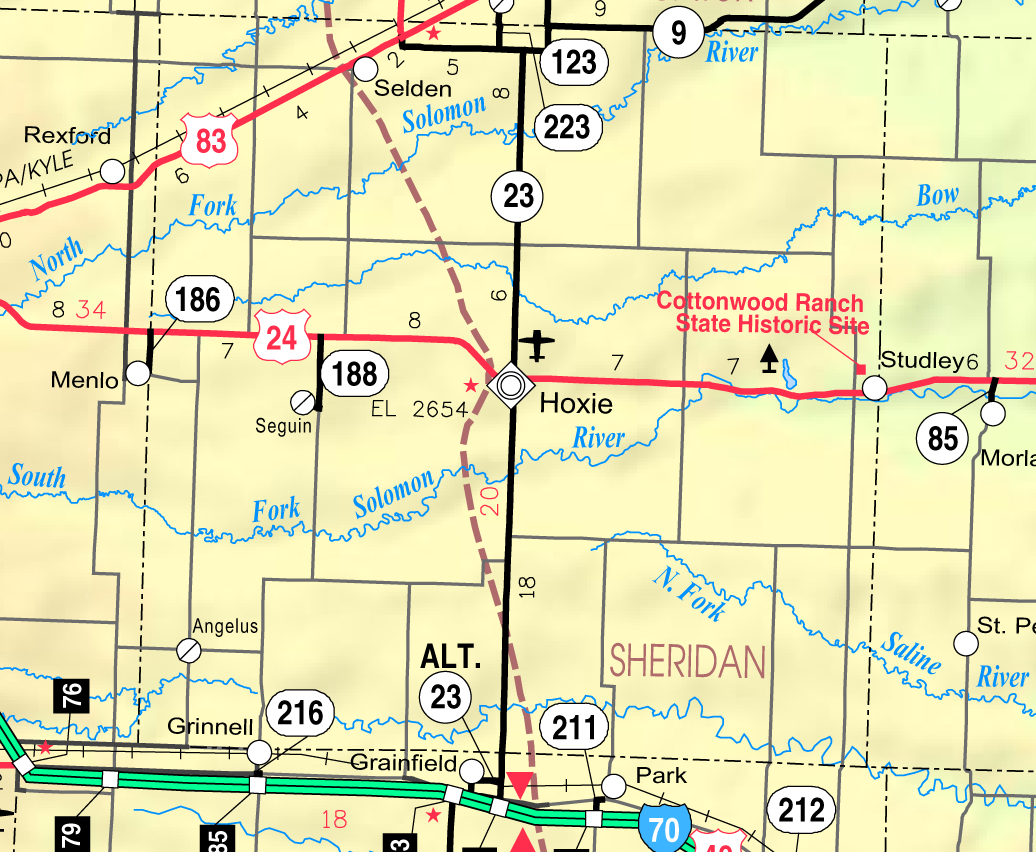
- KDOT map of Sheridan County (legend)

- Location within Kansas Location within the United States
- Coordinates: 39°22′50″N 100°43′12″W
- Country: United States
- State: Kansas
- County: Sheridan
- Elevation: 2,986 ft (910 m)

Population
  - Total: 0
- Time zone: UTC-6 (CST)
  - Summer (DST): UTC-5 (CDT)
- Area code: 785
- GNIS ID: 482590

Mystic is a ghost town in Sheridan County, Kansas, United States.

== History ==
Mystic was issued a post office in 1887. The post office was discontinued in 1889.
