= Museum, Kansas =

Ghost town in Sheridan County, Kansas

- Ghost town
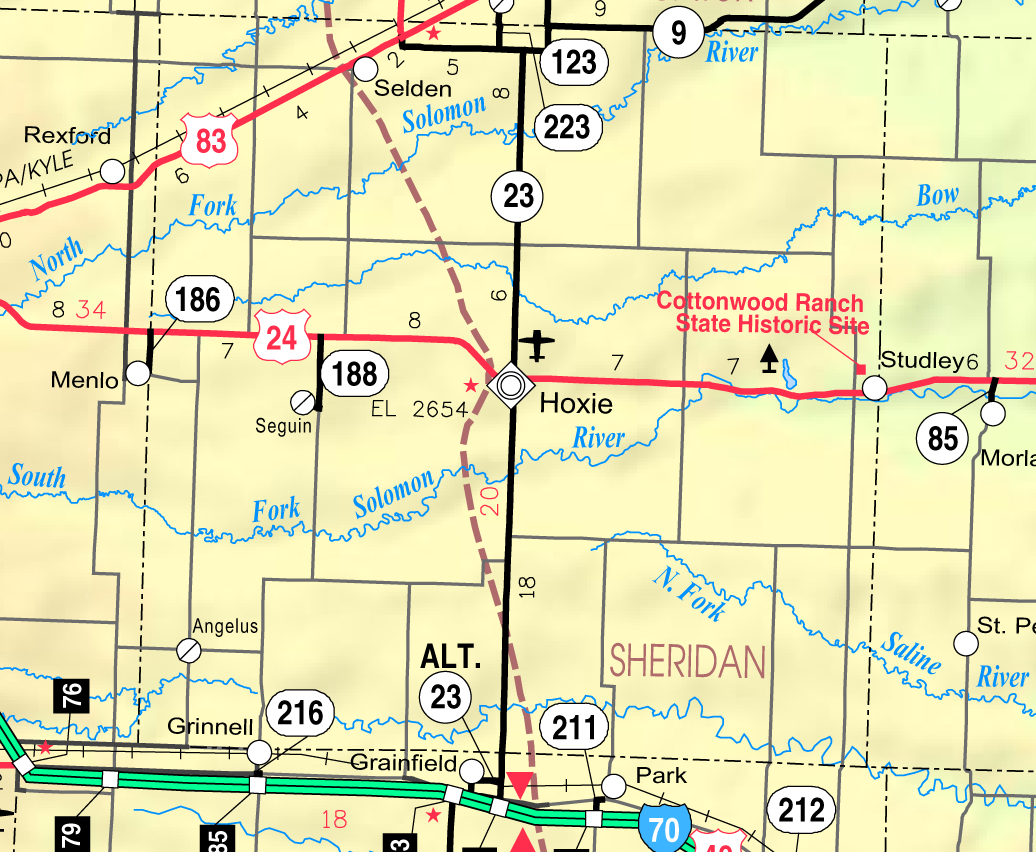
- KDOT map of Sheridan County (legend)

- Location within Kansas Location within the United States
- Coordinates: 39°19′55″N 100°14′08″W
- Country: United States
- State: Kansas
- County: Sheridan
- Elevation: 2,451 ft (747 m)

Population
  - Total: 0
- Time zone: UTC-6 (CST)
  - Summer (DST): UTC-5 (CDT)
- Area code: 785
- GNIS ID: 482593

Museum is a ghost town in Sheridan County, Kansas, United States.

== History ==
Museum was issued a post office in 1882. The post office was discontinued in 1898.
