= Milo, Kansas =

- Ghost town
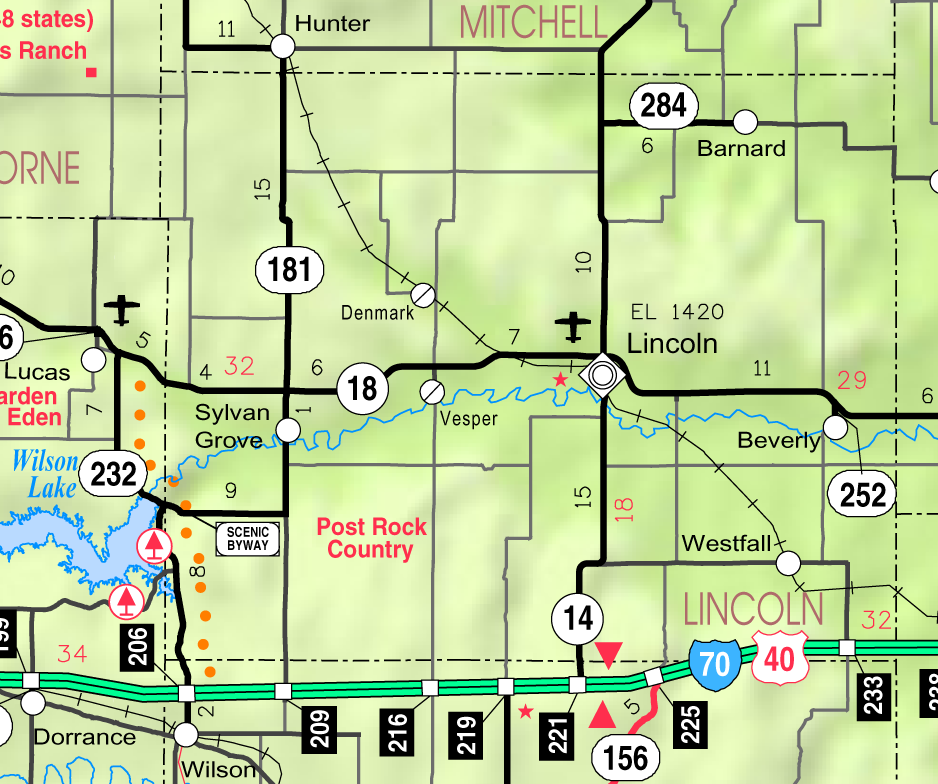
- KDOT map of Lincoln County (legend)

- Location within Kansas Location within the United States
- Coordinates: 39°10′20″N 97°58′03″W
- Country: United States
- State: Kansas
- County: Lincoln
- Elevation: 1,299 ft (396 m)

Population
  - Total: 0
- Time zone: UTC-6 (CST)
  - Summer (DST): UTC-5 (CDT)
- Area code: 785
- FIPS code: 20-46850
- GNIS ID: 484773

Milo is a ghost town in Lincoln County, Kansas, United States. It was located along a former railroad about halfway between the communities of Barnard and Ada.

== History ==
Milo was issued a post office in 1872. The post office was discontinued in 1938.

The 1912 cyclopedia of Kansas describes Milo as a "country trading point" on Atchison, Topeka and Santa Fe Railway, with "2 stores, an express office, and a money order postoffice with one rural route." It reported the 1910 population to be 50 people.

The referenced rail line opened in 1888 as a line of the Chicago, Kansas and Western Railroad opened from Manchester in the east to Barnard in the west, a 43 mile line, with a stop at Milo. The Atchison, Topeka and Santa Fe Railway took over operation of the line in 1901. An application was filed in 1983 to abandon this "Minneapolis District" line.
