= Topsy, Kansas =

- Ghost town
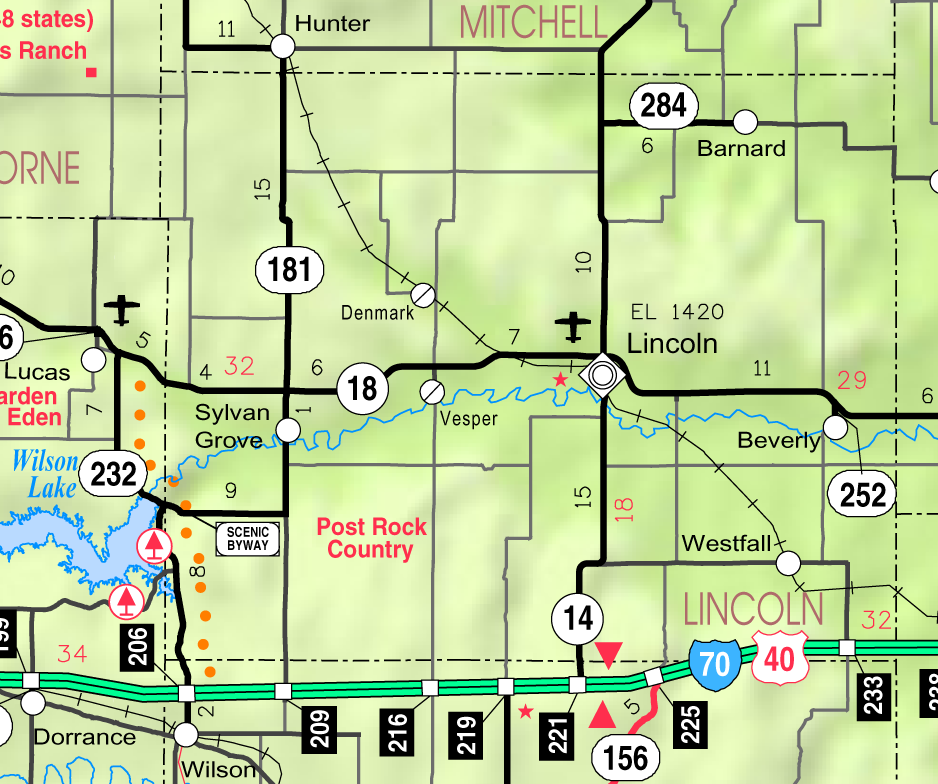
- KDOT map of Lincoln County (legend)

- Location within Kansas Location within the United States
- Coordinates: 38°55′46″N 98°02′26″W
- Country: United States
- State: Kansas
- County: Lincoln
- Elevation: 1,453 ft (443 m)

Population
  - Total: 0
- Time zone: UTC-6 (CST)
  - Summer (DST): UTC-5 (CDT)
- Area code: 785
- GNIS ID: 482329

Topsy is a ghost town in Lincoln County, Kansas, United States.

== History ==
Topsy was issued a post office in 1879. The post office was discontinued in 1886.
