= Bayne, Russell County, Kansas =

Bayne, Kansas
- Ghost town
- Location within the state of Kansas Bayne (the United States)
- Coordinates: 39°07′55″N 98°34′47″W
- Country: United States
- State: Kansas
- County: Russell
- Elevation: 1,621 ft (494 m)
- Time zone: UTC-6 (Central (CST))
  - Summer (DST): UTC-5 (CDT)
- GNIS feature ID: 482557

Bayne is a ghost town in Russell County, Kansas, United States.

== History ==
Bayne, Russell County, Kansas was issued a post office in 1883. The post office was discontinued in 1888. Ingalls, Kansas across the Lincoln County line was then renamed Bayne.
