= Lucerne, Kansas =

Ghost town in Sheridan County, Kansas

- Ghost town
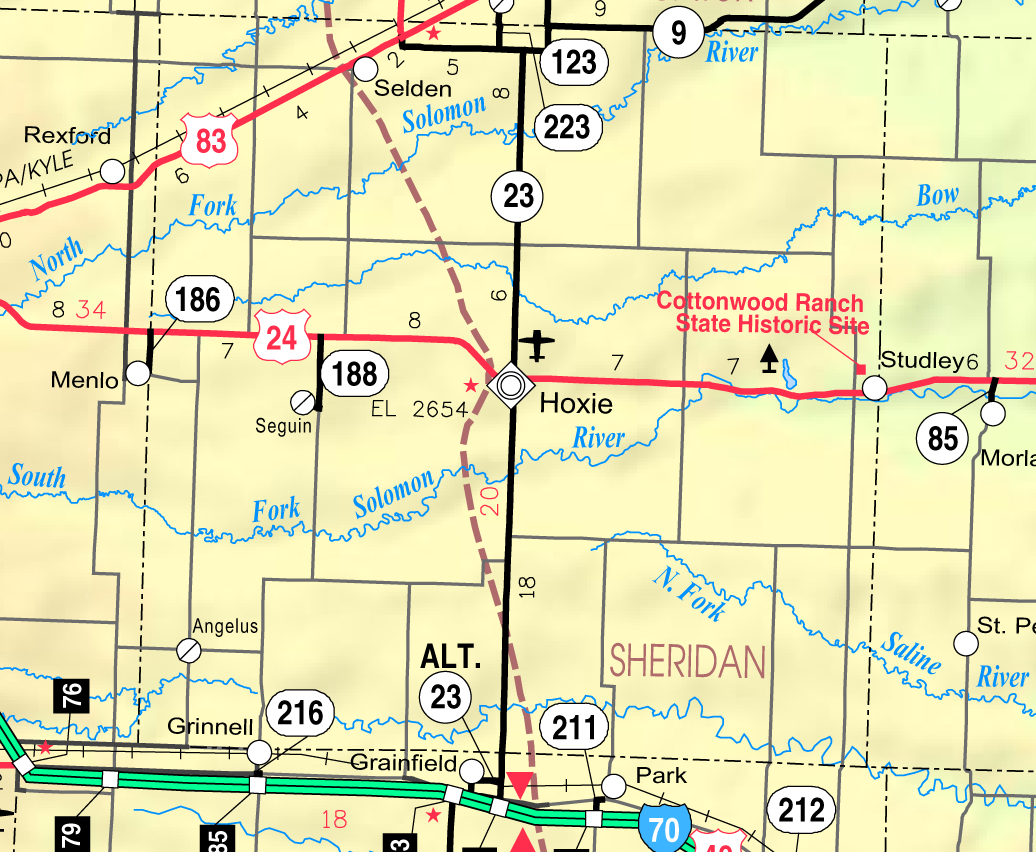
- KDOT map of Sheridan County (legend)

- Location within Kansas Location within the United States
- Coordinates: 39°29′48″N 100°12′01″W
- Country: United States
- State: Kansas
- County: Sheridan
- Township: Adell
- Elevation: 2,648 ft (807 m)

Population
  - Total: 0
- Time zone: UTC-6 (CST)
  - Summer (DST): UTC-5 (CDT)
- Area code: 785
- GNIS ID: 484550

Lucerne is a ghost town in Adell Township, Sheridan County, Kansas, United States. It is approximately 18 miles northeast of the county seat of Hoxie.

== History ==
The town had a post office from 1880 until 1943. As of 2010, the remains of the town included a cemetery, stone foundation, and a partial wooden sign that used to announce the town's name. As of the 2010 census, the entirety of Adell Township had a population of only 12.

According to a 1912 reference work on Kansas, the town at that time held a population of 50, a general store, a hotel, a money order post office, and a daily stagecoach to the town of Jennings.
