= Paris, Lincoln County, Kansas =

Paris, Kansas
- Ghost town
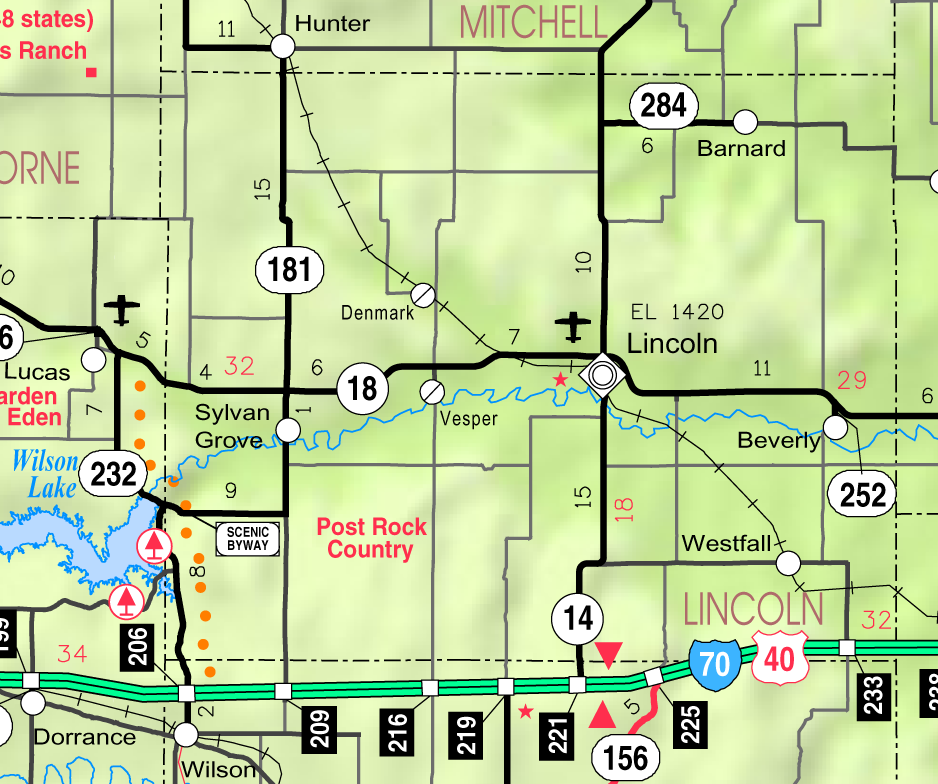
- KDOT map of Lincoln County (legend)

- Location within Kansas Location within the United States
- Coordinates: 39°12′30″N 98°12′31″W
- Country: United States
- State: Kansas
- County: Lincoln
- Elevation: 1,444 ft (440 m)

Population
  - Total: 0
- Time zone: UTC-6 (CST)
  - Summer (DST): UTC-5 (CDT)
- Area code: 785
- GNIS ID: 481968

Paris is a ghost town in Lincoln County, Kansas, United States.

== History ==
Paris was issued a post office in 1878. The post office was discontinued in 1898.
