= Thurman, Kansas =

Ghost town in Chase County, Kansas

- Ghost town
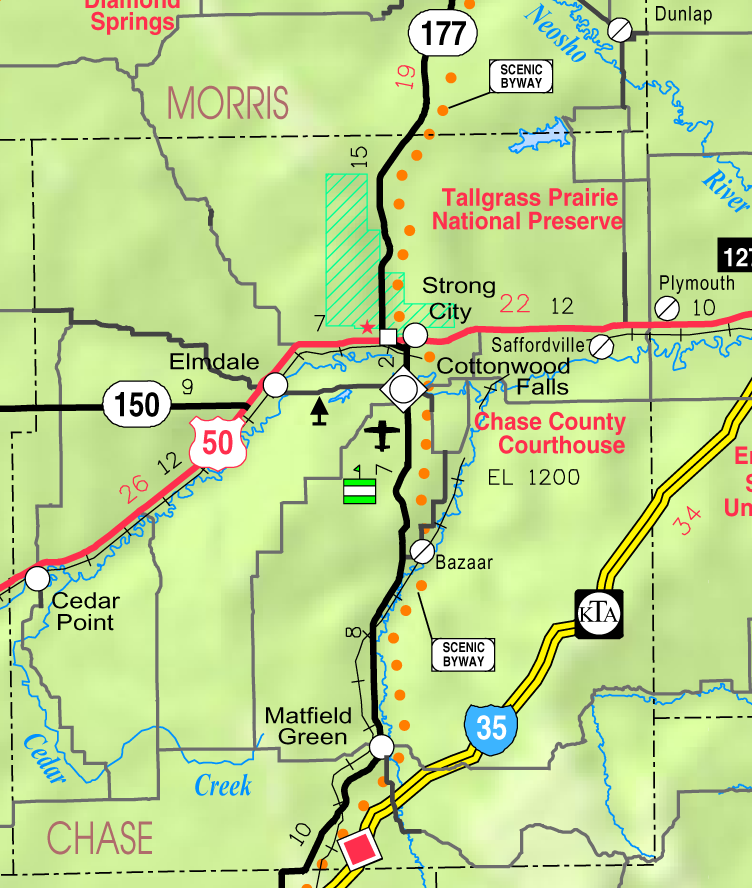
- KDOT map of Chase County (legend)

- Location within Kansas Location within the United States
- Coordinates: 38°6′3″N 96°31′1″W
- Country: United States
- State: Kansas
- County: Chase
- Elevation: 1,394 ft (425 m)

Population
  - Total: 0
- Time zone: UTC-6 (CST)
  - Summer (DST): UTC-5 (CDT)
- Area code: 620
- GNIS ID: 482064

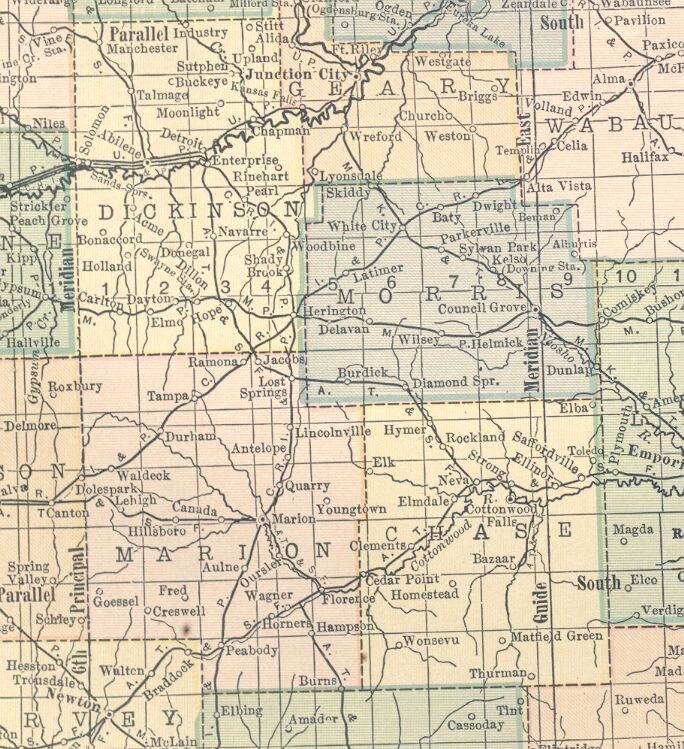
Location of Thurman according to a 1914 atlas

Thurman is a ghost town in Chase County, Kansas, United States. It was located southeast of Matfield Green in the rural Flint Hills.

== History ==
Founded in 1874, it experienced a period of decline that concluded in its abandonment in 1944. In 1900, the community was composed of over 50 households, and it included a post office, stores, schools, and a church.

A post office existed in Thurman from August 24, 1874 to January 31, 1909.

== Geography ==
The elevation of the Thurman site is 1,394 feet (425 m), and it is located at 38°6′3″N 96°31′1″W (38.1008519, -96.5169547), in the southeastern part of the county. Today, the site is located in southern Matfield Township.
