= Phelps, Kansas =

Ghost town in Sheridan County, Kansas

- Ghost town
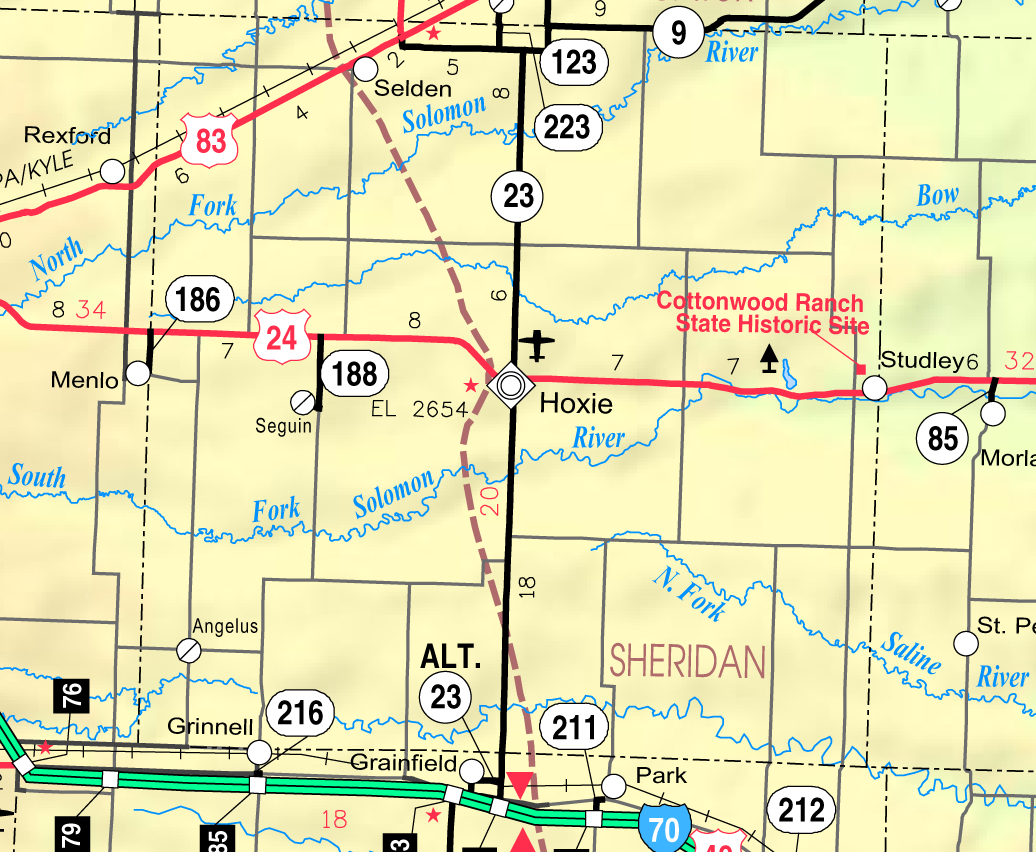
- KDOT map of Sheridan County (legend)

- Location within Kansas Location within the United States
- Coordinates: 39°14′44″N 100°10′26″W
- Country: United States
- State: Kansas
- County: Sheridan
- Elevation: 2,651 ft (808 m)

Population
  - Total: 0
- Time zone: UTC-6 (CST)
  - Summer (DST): UTC-5 (CDT)
- Area code: 785
- GNIS ID: 482594

Phelps is a ghost town in Sheridan County, Kansas, United States.

== History ==
Phelps was issued a post office in 1886. The post office was discontinued in 1907.
