= Bristow, Kansas =

- Ghost town
- Location within Kansas Location within the United States
- Coordinates: 39°21′03″N 98°45′03″W
- Country: United States
- State: Kansas
- County: Osborne
- Elevation: 1,716 ft (523 m)

Population
  - Total: 0
- Time zone: UTC-6 (CST)
  - Summer (DST): UTC-5 (CDT)
- Area code: 785
- GNIS ID: 481838

Bristow is a ghost town in Independence Township, Osborne County, Kansas, United States.

== History ==
Emley was issued a post office in 1872. The post office was renamed Bristow in 1876, then discontinued in 1901. There is nothing left of Bristow.
