= Bayne, Lincoln County, Kansas =

Bayne, Kansas
- Ghost town
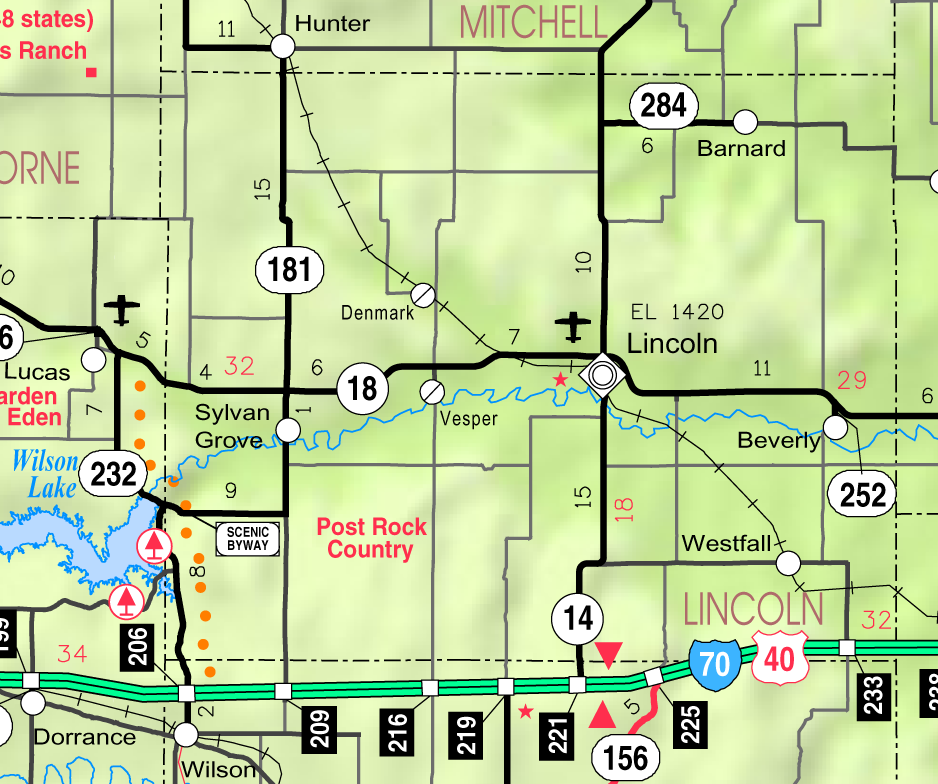
- KDOT map of Lincoln County (legend)

- Location within Kansas Location within the United States
- Coordinates: 39°11′21″N 98°22′06″W
- Country: United States
- State: Kansas
- County: Lincoln
- Elevation: 1,555 ft (474 m)

Population
  - Total: 0
- Time zone: UTC-6 (CST)
  - Summer (DST): UTC-5 (CDT)
- Area code: 785
- GNIS ID: 482316

Bayne is a ghost town in Lincoln County, Kansas, United States.

== History ==
Initially named Ingalls, the community was issued a post office in 1873. The post office was renamed Bayne in 1888 after the Bayne, Russell County, Kansas, post office was discontinued. The Bayne, Lincoln County, post office was discontinued in 1894.
