= Adell, Kansas =

Ghost town in Sheridan County, Kansas

- Ghost town
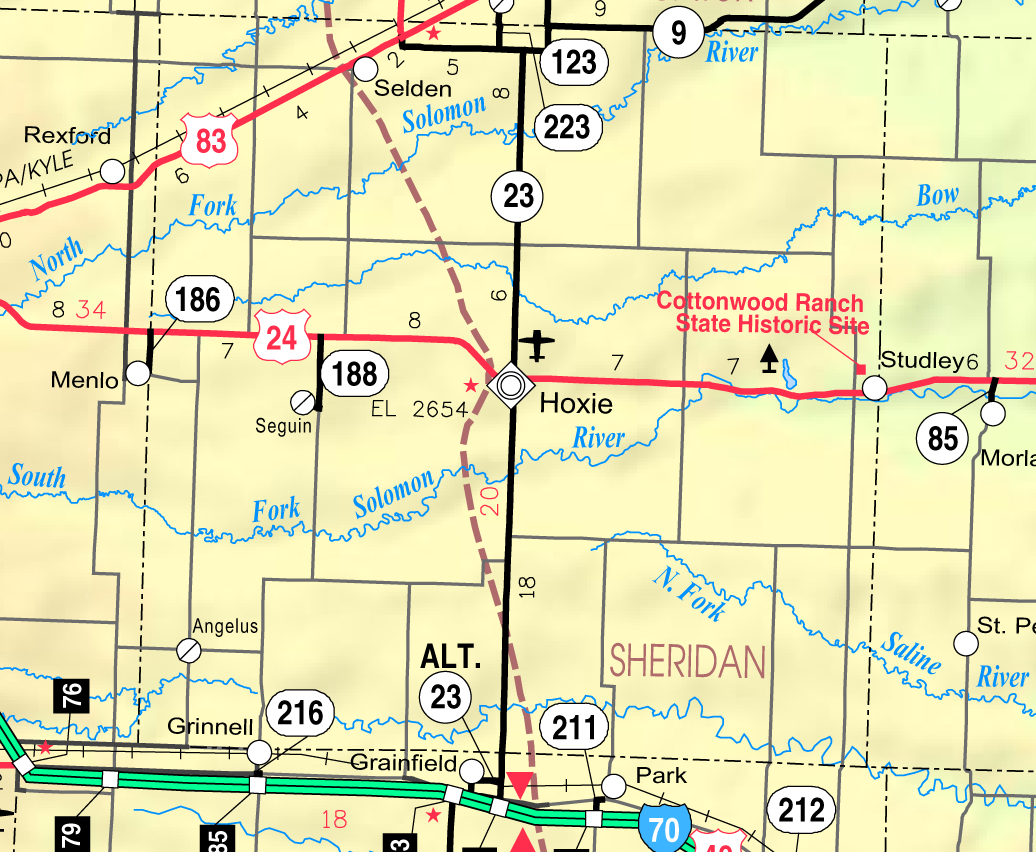
- KDOT map of Sheridan County (legend)

- Location within Kansas Location within the United States
- Coordinates: 39°33′22″N 100°19′05″W
- Country: United States
- State: Kansas
- County: Sheridan
- Elevation: 2,552 ft (778 m)

Population
  - Total: 0
- Time zone: UTC-6 (CST)
  - Summer (DST): UTC-5 (CDT)
- Area code: 785
- GNIS ID: 482588

Adell is a ghost town in Sheridan County, Kansas, United States.

== History ==
Adel was issued a post office in 1879. The post office was renamed Adell in 1885, then discontinued in 1892.
