= List of ghost towns in Kansas =

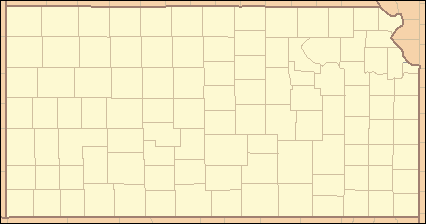

Map of the United States with Kansas highlighted

This is an incomplete list of ghost towns in the state of Kansas.

== Causes ==
Many reasons exist as to why a community becomes abandoned (or nearly so).

- Transportation: With the development of major highways and interstates, people were willing to travel farther for goods and services causing local businesses in smaller towns to lose customers and ultimately close. The more businesses that close, the more people are apt to want to move away to a bigger town. Transportation has played a major role in settlement in Kansas. As traffic from the Oregon and Santa Fe Trails increased, towns boomed along them. When railroads were established towns developed along the tracks or even moved to where the tracks were.
- Politics: In Kansas, the political atmosphere was highly divided. Towns were either proslavery or abolitionist. When Kansas became a free state in 1861, proslavery towns died out. Certain towns, lacking any other economic basis, banked their development on becoming a county seat. If they failed, there would be little employment, and the few inhabitants would abandon the town to find work elsewhere.
- Boom and bust: Towns that catered to a specific industry such as coal mining or military housing were boom towns that quickly died when their markets collapsed. Some towns that mainly relied on agriculture were abandoned in the 1930s during the Dust Bowl period.
- Eminent domain / flood control: Since 1951, the U.S. Army Corps of Engineers has sought to control floods through the building of dams along rivers and the resulting outcome is a town having to be moved or abandoned and demolished.
- Environmental degradation: Remnants of lead and zinc mining can cause soil contamination that can render entire communities uninhabitable; e.g. Treece.

== List ==
List of ghost towns in Kansas that are not incorporated cities or unincorporated communities:

=== Allen County ===
- Cofachique
- Octagon City

=== Anderson County ===
- Hyattville

=== Atchison County ===
- Mount Pleasant
- Pardee

=== Butler County ===
- Oil Hill
- Plum Grove
- Wingate

=== Chase County ===
- Elk
- Ellinor
- Homestead
- Hymer
- Thurman

=== Cherokee County ===
- Treece

=== Cheyenne County ===
- Calhoun
- Jaqua
- Lawnridge
- Marney
- Orlando

=== Clark County ===
- Lexington
- Letitia was located southwest of Minneola

=== Clay County ===
- Broughton
- Browndale

=== Cloud County ===
- Como
- Macyville
- Sibley
- Yuma

=== Cowley County ===
- Floral
- Wilmot

=== Decatur County ===
- Bassetville
- Decatur
- Hawkeye
- Hooker
- Jackson
- Lund
- Sheffield
- Shibboleth
- Stephen
- Vallonia

=== Doniphan County ===
- Geary

=== Douglas County ===
- Belvoir
- Franklin
- Lapeer
- Louisiana
- Media
- Prairie City
- Twin Mound
- Weaver

=== Elk County ===
- Cave Springs
- Fiat
- Upola

=== Ellis County ===
- Chetolah
- Easdale
- Hog Back
- Mendota
- Rome
- Smoky Hill City
- Stockrange
- Turkville

=== Ellsworth County ===
- Terra Cotta

=== Finney County ===
- Eminence
- Ravanna

=== Franklin County ===
- Appanoose
- Greenwood
- Minneola
- Norwood
- Ohio City
- Silkville

=== Geary County ===
- Alida
- Pawnee

=== Gove County ===
- Alanthus
- Hackberry
- Jerome

=== Graham County ===
- Fargo
- Happy
- Houston
- Kebar
- Millbrook
- Olean
- Roscoe
- Togo
- Turnerville
- Whitfield
- Wild Horse

=== Greeley County ===
- Astor

=== Greenwood County ===
- Teterville
- Thrall
- Utopia

=== Harper County ===
- Albion

=== Harvey County ===
- Annelly

=== Haskell County ===
- Santa Fe

=== Jewell County ===
- Dentonia

=== Labette County ===
- Mortimer

=== Leavenworth County ===
- Delaware City

=== Lincoln County ===
- Bacon
- Bayne
- Cedron
- Herman
- Lone Walnut
- Milo
- Monroe
- Orbitello
- Orworth
- Paris
- Pinon
- Pleasant Valley
- Pottersburg
- Rosette
- Topsy
- Towerspring
- Union Valley
- Woodey
- Yorktown

=== Linn County ===
- Barnard
- Blooming Grove
- Brooklin
- Keokuk
- Hail Ridge
- Harmonia
- Jackson
- Linnville
- Mansfield
- Moneka
- Oakwood
- Paris
- Potosi
- Twin Springs

=== Logan County ===
- McAllaster
- Sheridan

=== Marion County ===
- Elk
- Gnadenau
- Hampson
- Oursler
- Waldeck
- Watchorn

=== Marshall County ===
- Bigelow
- Irving

=== Mitchell County ===
- Blue Hill
- Buel
- Coursens Grove
- Elmira
- Saltville
- Victor
- Walnut Grove
- West Asher

=== Montgomery County ===
- Le Hunt

=== Morris County ===
- Comiskey

=== Neosho ===
- Ladore

=== Norton County ===
- Bower
- Brett
- Cactus
- Devizes
- Fairhaven
- Hanback
- Hedgewood
- Rayville
- Rockwell
- Smithton
- Wakeman

=== Osborne County ===
- Banks
- Bristow
- Cheyenne
- Delhi
- Deliverance
- Dial
- Emley
- Forney
- Free Will
- Handy
- Pleasant Plain
- Potterville
- Roundmound
- Twin Creek
- Vincent
- Yoxall

=== Ottawa County ===
- Vine Creek

=== Phillips County ===
- Crow
- Dickeyville
- Goode
- Jimtown
- Luctor
- Matteson
- Myrtle
- Pleasant Green
- Powell
- Wagnerville
- West Cedar

=== Rawlins County ===
- Achilles
- Beardsley
- Beaverton
- Burntwood
- Celia
- Chardon
- Gladstone
- Greshamton
- Mirage
- Rawlins
- Rotate

=== Reno County ===
- Kent

=== Republic County ===
- Sherdahl
- White Rock

=== Rice County ===
- Crawford
- Galt

=== Rooks County ===
- Adamson
- Alcona
- Amboy
- Chandler
- Cresson
- Earnest
- Frankton
- Gould City
- Highhill
- Hoskins
- Igo
- Laton
- McHale
- Motor
- Nyra
- Portage
- Slate
- Sugarloaf
- Survey
- Rockport

=== Rush County ===
- Belfield
- Brookdale
- Fenton
- Flavius
- Hampton
- Hutton
- Lippard
- Olney
- Pioneer
- Ryan
- Saunders
- West Point

=== Russell County ===
- Bayne
- Blue Stem
- East Wolf
- Fay
- Forest Hill
- Greenvale
- Hawley
- Jack
- Kennebec
- Success
- Winterset
- Woodville

=== Seward County ===
- Arkalon

=== Shawnee County ===
- Richland

=== Sheridan County ===
- Adell
- Alcyone
- Chicago
- Lucerne
- Museum
- Mystic
- Phelps
- Sheridan
- Ute
- Violenta

=== Smith County ===
- Cora
- Germantown
- Hardilee
- Jacksonburg
- Twelve Mile

=== Stevens County ===
- Woodsdale

=== Sumner County ===
- Bushnell
- Cleardale
- Doster
- Ewell
- Metcalf
- Roland
- Sumner City

=== Thomas County ===
- Copeland
- Cumberland
- Kuka
- Otterbourne
- Quickville

=== Trego County ===
- Banner
- Bosna
- Cyrus
- Wilcox

=== Wabaunsee County ===
- Vera

=== Washington County ===
- Strawberry

=== Wichita County ===
- Farmer City

== See also ==
- List of counties in Kansas
- List of townships in Kansas
- List of cities in Kansas
- List of unincorporated communities in Kansas
- List of census-designated places in Kansas
- Lists of places in Kansas
- Kansas locations by per capita income
- Kansas census statistical areas
- Kansas license plate county codes
