= Valley Township, Sheridan County, Kansas =

Township in Sheridan County, Kansas, U.S.

Valley Township
- Township
- Location within Sheridan County

- Location within Kansas
- Coordinates: 39°21′00″N 100°16′11″W
- Country: United States
- State: Kansas
- County: Sheridan

Area
  - Total: 71.78 sq mi (185.9 km^{2})
  - Land: 71.716 sq mi (185.74 km^{2})
  - Water: 0.064 sq mi (0.17 km^{2}) 0.09%
- Elevation: 2,457 ft (749 m)

Population (2020)
  - Total: 102
  - Density: 1.42/sq mi (0.549/km^{2})
- Time zone: UTC-6 (CST)
  - Summer (DST): UTC-5 (CDT)
- Area code: 785
- GNIS feature ID: 471220

Valley Township is a township in Sheridan County, Kansas, United States. As of the 2020 census, its population was 102.

== Geography ==
Valley Township covers an area of 71.78 square miles (185.9 square kilometers). The South Fork Solomon River flows through it, as well as Sand Creek, Cortez Creek, South Martin Creek, Museum Creek, East Creek, Center Fork, Southwest Fork County Line Creek, Foster Creek, and Storer Creek.

=== Communities ===
- Studley
- Tasco

=== Adjacent townships ===
Bowcreek Township, Sheridan County
Parnell Township, Sheridan County	northwest	north	northeast	Gettysburg Township, Graham County
Kenneth Township, Sheridan County	west	self
West Saline Township, Sheridan County; Springbrook Township, Sheridan County	southwest		southeast	Solomon Township, Graham County; East Saline Township, Sheridan County

== Transportation ==
=== Major highways ===
- US-24
