= WaKeeney Township, Kansas =

Township in Trego County, Kansas, U.S.

WaKeeney Township
- Township
- Location within Trego County
- Coordinates: 38.921302°N 99.865423°W
- Country: United States
- State: Kansas
- County: Trego
- Established: 1879

Area
  - Total: 299.492 sq mi (775.68 km^{2})
  - Land: 294.954 sq mi (763.93 km^{2})
  - Water: 4.538 sq mi (11.75 km^{2}) 1.52%

Population (2020)
  - Total: 2,160
  - Density: 7.32/sq mi (2.83/km^{2})
- Time zone: UTC-6 (CST)
  - Summer (DST): UTC-5 (CDT)
- Area code: 785
- GNIS feature ID: 472430

WaKeeney Township is a township in Trego County, Kansas, United States. As of the 2020 census, its population was 2,160.

== History ==
The townships in Trego County have been through many border and land changes throughout their history. The first three townships were created on June 26, 1879. WaKeeney Township was the center third of the county. By the 1880s, Downer Township was created from southern parts of WaKeeney Township and Collyer Township. Downer Township would eventually be reabsorbed back into Collyer Township and WaKeeney Township, and Wilcox Township was created from the southern part of WaKeeney Township. In the 2020s, Wilcox Township would be merged back into WaKeeney Township.

== Geography ==
WaKeeney Township covers an area of 299.492 square miles (775.68 km^{2}), 1.52% of it water. Part of Cedar Bluff Reservoir and Cedar Bluff State Park lie within the township. The Smoky Hill River, Big Creek, and Saline River flow through it, as well as Page Creek, Trego Creek, Happy Creek, and Chalk Creek.

=== Communities ===
- WaKeeney

=== Adjacent townships ===
Happy Township, Graham County
		north	northeast	Morlan Township, Graham County
Collyer Township, Trego County	west	self	east	Ogallah Township, Trego County
		south	southeast	Waring Township, Ness County
Nevada Township, Ness County

== Transportation ==
The Trego WaKeeney Airport, which serves the city of WaKeeney and Trego County, lies within the township.

=== Major highways ===
- I-70
- I-70 BS
- US-40
- US-283

== Demographics ==
As of the 2020 census, the township had a population of 2,160, giving a population density of 7.32 people per square mile (2.83 people/km^{2}). The racial makeup of the township was 93.8% White, 0.5% Asian, 0.2% Native American, 0.1% Black or African American, 0.3% from some other race, and 5.0% from two or more races. Hispanics or Latinos of any race were 2.4% of the population.

The 2020–2024 American Community Survey estimated that the township contained 1,141 households and 1,307 housing units.
