= East Saline Township, Kansas =

Township in Sheridan County, Kansas, U.S.

East Saline Township
- Township
- Location within Sheridan County

- Location within Kansas
- Coordinates: 39°13′00″N 100°13′01″W
- Country: United States
- State: Kansas
- County: Sheridan
- Established: 1917

Area
  - Total: 71.765 sq mi (185.87 km^{2})
  - Land: 71.743 sq mi (185.81 km^{2})
  - Water: 0.022 sq mi (0.057 km^{2}) 0.03%
- Elevation: 2,569 ft (783 m)

Population (2010)
  - Total: 48
  - Density: 0.67/sq mi (0.26/km^{2})
- Time zone: UTC-6 (CST)
  - Summer (DST): UTC-5 (CDT)
- Area code: 785
- GNIS feature ID: 471279

East Saline Township is a township in Sheridan County, Kansas, United States. As of the 2020 census, its population was 48.

== History ==
East Saline Township and West Saline Township were originally part of Saline Township, which was divided in two in 1917. Saline Township had a population of 849 in the 1910 census.

== Geography ==
East Saline Township covers an area of 71.765 square miles (185.87 square kilometers). The Saline River flows through it.

=== Adjacent townships ===
Valley Township, Sheridan County
		north	northeast	Solomon Township, Graham County
West Saline Township, Sheridan County	west	self	east	Bryant Township, Graham County
		south
Baker Township, Gove County
