= Cottonwood Ranch =

- John Fenton Pratt Ranch
- U.S. National Register of Historic Places
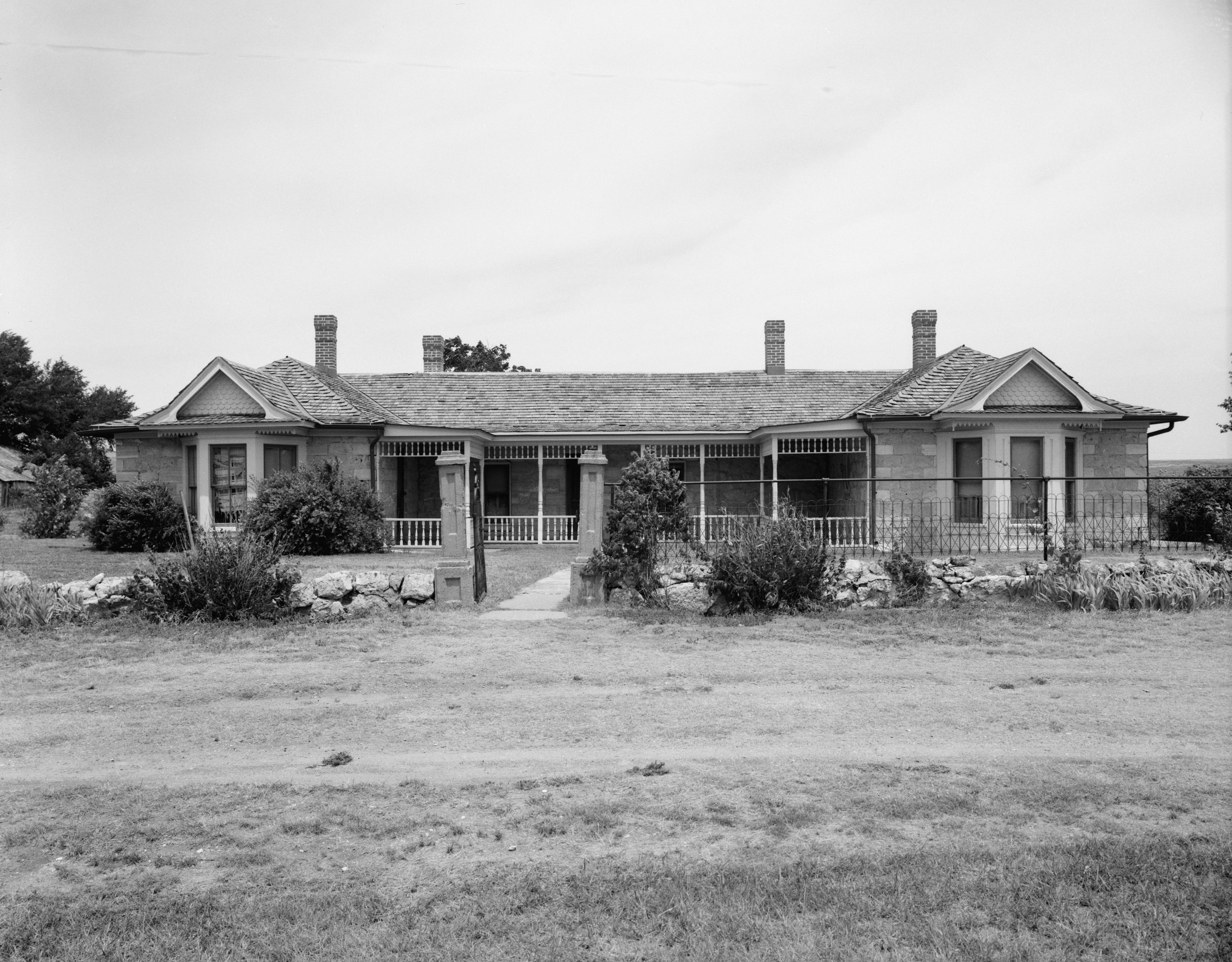
- Front of the ranch house

- Location within Kansas Location within the United States
- Location: Valley Township, Sheridan County, Kansas, US
- Nearest city: Morland, Kansas
- Coordinates: 39°21′20″N 100°10′25″W
- Architect: John Fenton Pratt
- NRHP reference No.: 83000442
- Added to NRHP: April 28, 1983

The Cottonwood Ranch is a historic site near Studley in Valley Township, Sheridan County, Kansas, United States. The ranch is now preserved as a Kansas State Historic Site.

The ranch was built by Abraham Pratt, an Englishman who first came to the United States during the years of the Colorado Gold Rush. After returning to England, he immigrated to Kansas with his sons John Fenton and Tom and settled in the Studley vicinity. Beginning in 1885, the men built a one-room stone house with a sod roof and dirt floor. After it proved inadequate for shelter from the winter conditions, it was re-roofed with wood, and it was expanded in later years. Other buildings at the ranch included a sod stable, a sod-walled corral, and a wood-framed outbuilding with a toilet. A storage cistern was constructed to store water from a natural spring on the property.

In 1983, the ranch property was listed on the National Register of Historic Places as the John Fenton Pratt Ranch.
