= U.S. Route 24 in Kansas =

Segment of American highway

U.S. Highway 24
- US 24 highlighted in red

Route information
- Maintained by KDOT
- Length: 435.95 mi (701.59 km)
- Existed: 1936–present

Major junctions
- West end: I-70 / US 24 at Colorado state line near Kanorado
- US-83 near Gem; US-283 in Hill City; US-183 in Stockton; US-281 in Osborne; US-81 near Glascoe; US-77 in Riley; US-59 near Williamstown; US-40 in Lawrence; US-73 / K-7 in Bonner Springs; I-70 / Kansas Turnpike in Bonner Springs
- East end: I-70 / US 24 / US 40 at Missouri state line in Kansas City

Location
- Country: United States
- State: Kansas
- Counties: Sherman, Thomas, Sheridan, Graham, Rooks, Osborne, Mitchell, Cloud, Clay, Riley, Pottawatomie, Shawnee, Jefferson, Douglas, Leavenworth, Wyandotte

Highway system
- United States Numbered Highway System; List; Special; Divided; Kansas State Highway System; Interstate; US; State; Spurs
← K-23	→ K-25

U.S. Highway 24 (US-24) in the state of Kansas runs east–west across the northern half of the state for 435.95 miles (701.59 km). The route mostly connects rural communities across the High Plains of Kansas, while also later providing an Interstate alternate between Topeka, Lawrence, and Kansas City. US-24 both enters and exits the state running concurrently with Interstate 70 (I-70). Along with US-40, the road has largely been replaced by the more modern Interstate in its functionality as a long-distance route.

== Route description ==
US-24 enters the state from Colorado concurrent with I-70 southwest of Kanorado. For its first 46.061 miles (74.128 km), the route runs concurrently with the Interstate, passing Goodland and Brewster. This is despite the fact that former alignment remains intact, albeit largely as a local road. The exception to this rule is a business route through downtown Goodland.

South-southwest of Levant, US-24 splits from the Interstate and begins heading northeastward before eastward and into Colby. The route passes through the northern side of town, intersecting K-25 before continuing east. Toward the Thomas–Sheridan county line, US-24 intersects US-83 in an extremely rural setting southeast of the town of Gem. The route continues through Sheridan, Graham, and Rooks counties, passing through the towns of Hoxie, Hill City, and Stockton and intersecting K-23, US-283, K-18, and US-183. US-24 also passes by several other smaller communities, such as Menlo and Morland, connecting to those towns via secondary state highways. Additionally, the route passes around the northern edge of the Webster Reservoir in western Rooks County.

In Osborne, the highway joins US-281 and begins heading northward. South of Portis, US-24 leaves US-281 and returns to an eastward trajectory, picking up a concurrency with K-9 in the process. The route passes through Downs and Cawker City, around Waconda Lake, and into Beloit. In Beloit, it junctions K-14, before K-9 splits toward the east as US-24 begins a southeastward run to Glasco, where it returns to an eastward trajectory. East of that town, the route crosses US-81 in another rural setting. US-24 continues through Clay County and Clay Center and into Riley County.

Shortly after Leonardville, US-24 takes a sharp rightward turn before intersecting US-77 on the north side of Riley, returning to an eastward direction and running concurrently. The routes split shortly thereafter as US-24 begins heading southeast toward Manhattan. The route passes around the city to the northeast and east sides, before splitting away from town at K-177 heading into Pottawatomie County and crossing the Big Blue River.

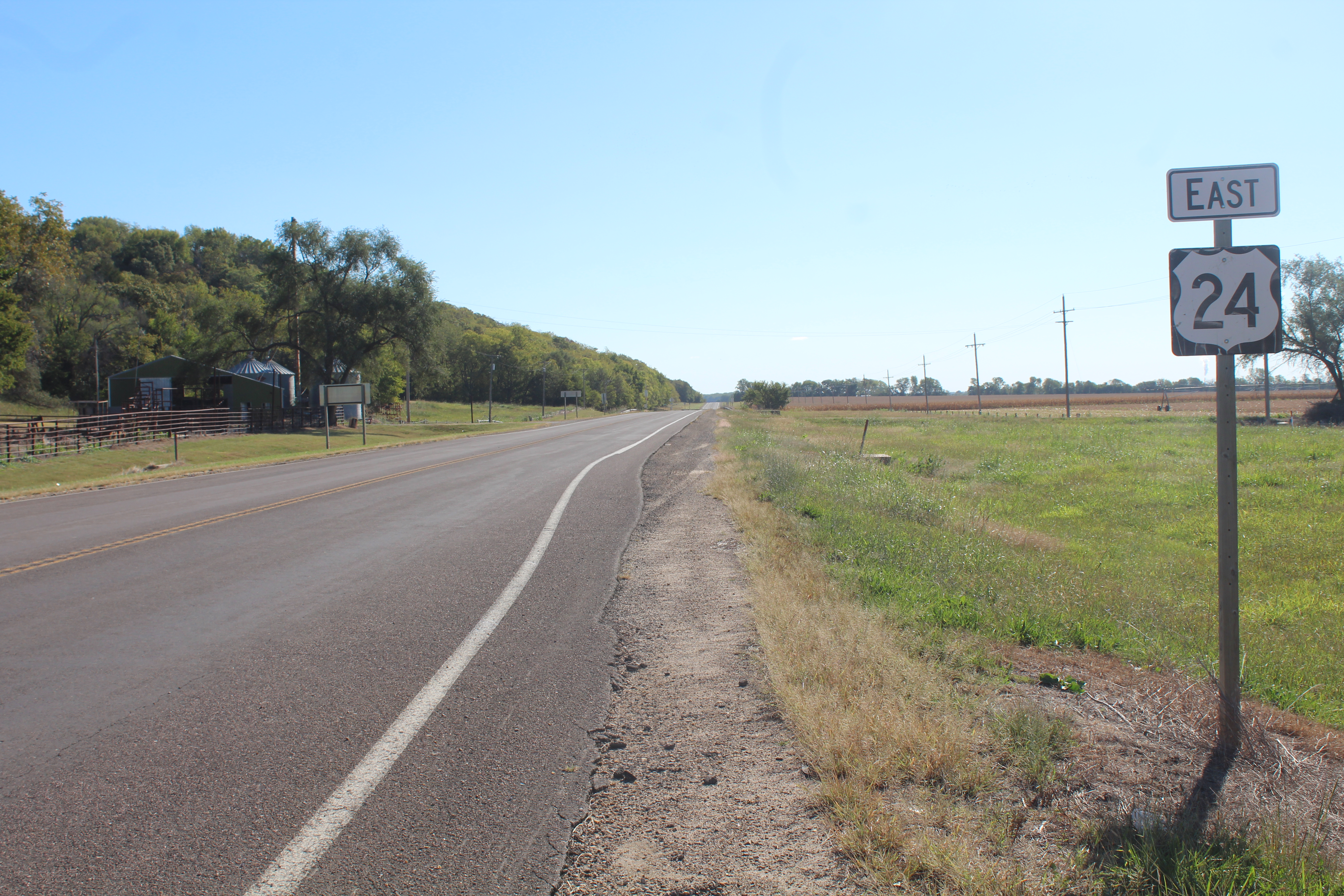
US-24 eastbound east of Perry

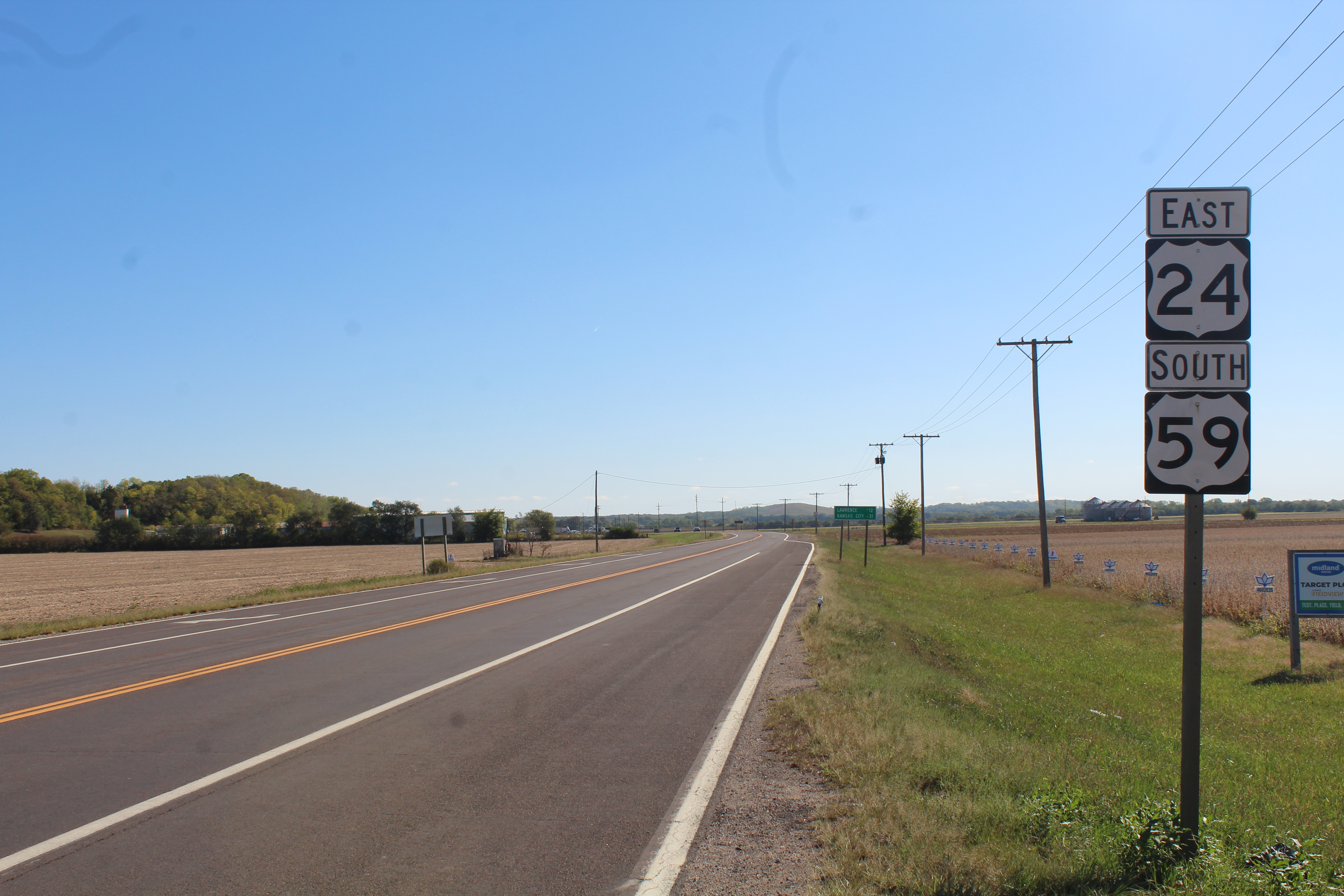
Concurrency of US-24 and US-59 near Williamstown

US-24 runs across the southern edge of the county parallel to the Kansas River, passing through Wamego, Belvue, and St. Marys. Entering Shawnee, US-24 begins heading southeastward toward Topeka via Rossville and Silver Lake. US-24 passes across the northern end of Topeka as a hybrid limited-access road, with four interchanges in and around the city, including ones with US-75 and K-4, with a short concurrency between interchanges with the last route. US-24 continues eastward, paralleling the Kansas River through Jefferson County, passing through Grantville and Perry, then picking up a concurrency with US-59 north of Williamstown. The routes then turn south toward Lawrence, with US-24 splitting to the east and gaining a concurrency with US-40 on the north side of the city as US-59 and US-40 west head south toward downtown. US-24/US-40 heads northeast toward Tonganoxie, where it turns east once again. On the Kansas City–Bonner Springs city line, the two routes intersect US-73 and K-7 at a cloverleaf interchange, where US-24/US-40 joins US-73/K-7 southward toward I-70 and Bonner Springs. At I-70, US-24 and US-40 join the Interstate Highway eastward, while US-73 ends and K-7 continues southward into the core of Bonner Springs. US-24 continues with I-70 into Kansas City and across the Kansas River into Kansas City, Missouri.

== History ==
U.S. Highway 40N
- Location: Colorado state line–Manhattan
- Length: 327 mi (526 km)
- Existed: 1926–1935

When the United States Numbered Highway System was first instituted in 1926, much of what is now US-24 was designated as U.S. Highway 40N (US-40N). US-40N ran along present-day US-24 between Limon, Colorado, and Manhattan. At Manhattan, it and US-40S recombined into US-40, which used the present alignment of US-24 eastward toward Topeka. Between Topeka and Lawrence, K-10 occupied the current alignment of US-24 as US-40 used its still standing alignment on the south side of the Kansas River. At Lawrence, US-40 returned to using US-24's alignment onto Kansas City and Missouri. In 1935, US-40N was decommissioned and US-24 was extended westward from its previous terminus at Independence across the state into Colorado and eventually on to Grand Junction, Colorado (later reduced to Minturn, Colorado).

== Major junctions ==
County	Location	mi	km	Exit	Destinations	Notes
Sherman		0.00	0.00		I-70 west / US 24 west	Continuation into Colorado
Sherman		1.35	2.17	1	K-267 – Kanorado	
Sherman		9.32	15.00	9	County Road 11	
Sherman		12.27	19.75	12	County Road 14	
Sherman	Goodland	17.27	27.79	17	US 24 Bus. east / K-27 – Sharon Springs, St. Francis	
Sherman	Goodland	19.25	30.98	19	US 24 Bus. west – Goodland	
Sherman		27.22	43.81	27	K-253 – Edson	
Thomas		36.34	58.48	36	K-184 – Brewster	
Thomas		46.061	74.128	45	I-70 east / County Road 11 – Salina	Eastern end of I-70 overlap
Thomas	Colby	54.967	88.461		K-25 (North Range Avenue) to I-70 – Oakley, Atwood, College	To I-70, airport signed westbound only
Thomas		64.966	104.553		US-83 – Oakley, Oberlin	
Thomas–Sheridan county line		73.223	117.841		K-186 south / County Road 11 – Menlo	Northern terminus of K-186
Sheridan		80.159	129.003		K-188 south / CR 481 / Road 80W – Seguin	Northern terminus of K-188
Sheridan	Hoxie	88.681	142.718		K-23 (Main Street) – Gove, Oberlin	
Graham		108.572	174.730		K-85 south – Morland, St. Peter	Northern terminus of K-85
Graham		113.907	183.316		K-84 south – Penokee	Northern terminus of K-84
Graham	Hill City	120.713	194.269		US-283 (Fourth Avenue) – Wakeeney, Norton	
Graham		129.286	208.066		K-18 east – Bogue, Plainville	Western terminus of K-18; Bogue signed eastbound only
Rooks		144.730	232.920		K-258 south – Webster Reservoir	Interchange; northern terminus of K-258
Rooks	Stockton	152.689	245.729		US-183 (Cedar Street) – Hays, Phillipsburg	
Osborne	Osborne	184.436	296.821		US-281 south (North First Street) / West 80th Street – Osborne	Western end of US-281 overlap; hospital signed eastbound only
Osborne		188.441	303.266		US-281 north / K-9 west / 40th Drive – Smith Center	Eastern end of US-281 overlap; western end of K-9 overlap
Osborne	Downs	196.362	316.014		K-181 (Morgan Avenue) – Lebanon, Tipton	
Mitchell		207.620	334.132		K-128 north to US-36 / Glen Elder State Park	Southern terminus of K-128
Mitchell		220.160	354.313		K-14 – Jewell, Marshall County Historical Museum	
Mitchell	Beloit	220.832	355.395		K-9 east – Concordia	Eastern end of K-9 overlap
Mitchell		229.574	369.464		K-193 south / Honey Lane – Asherville	Northern terminus of K-193
Mitchell–Cloud county line		232.193	373.678		K-194 south / County Road 757 – Simpson	Northern terminus of K-194
Cloud		247.501	398.314		US-81 – Salina, Concordia, National Orphan Train Museum	Interchange on US 81
Cloud		259.144	417.052		K-189 south / 260th Road – Miltonvale, St. Joseph, Ames	Northern terminus of K-189
Clay	Clay Center	276.689	445.288		K-15 (Sixth Street) – Abilene, Washington	
Riley		288.379	464.101		K-82 west / Cavalry Road – Junction City	Northern terminus of K-82
Riley		297.661	479.039		US-77 south / North Main Street – Junction City, Riley	Western end of US-77 overlap
Riley		301.759	485.634		US-77 north / Stockdale Park Road – Marysville	Eastern end of US-77 overlap
Riley		310.375	499.500		K-113 south – Manhattan, Kansas State University	Northern terminus of K-113; Kansas State, hospital signed eastbound only
Riley		311.317– 311.326	501.016– 501.031		K-13 north to K-16 – Tuttle Creek State Park	Southern terminus of K-13
Riley	Manhattan	316.972– 316.980	510.117– 510.130		K-177 south (Fort Riley Boulevard) – Council Grove	Northern terminus of K-177
Pottawatomie	Wamego	330.920– 330.932	532.564– 532.583		K-99 (Lincoln Avenue) to I-70 – Alma, Westmoreland, Oz Museum, Columbian City Park	
Pottawatomie	St. Marys	344.009	553.629		K-63 north (North Sixth Street) / South Sixth Street – Seneca	Southern terminus of K-63
Shawnee	Topeka	364.823– 364.829	587.126– 587.135		US-75 – Topeka, Holton	Cloverleaf interchange
Shawnee	Topeka	368.271	592.675		Topeka Boulevard	Cloverleaf interchange
Shawnee		371.311– 371.328	597.567– 597.594		K-4 west	Western end of K-4 overlap; trumpet interchange
Shawnee		371.983– 371.992	598.649– 598.663		K-4 east – Valley Falls	Eastern end of K-4 overlap; diamond interchange
Jefferson		378.575– 378.580	609.257– 609.265		K-237 north / Bridge Road – Perry State Park	Southern terminus of K-237
Jefferson		386.383	621.823		US-59 north / Oak Street – Williamstown, Oskaloosa	Western end of US-59 overlap
Douglas		394.813	635.390		US-40 west / US-59 south to I-70 / 1800 North – Lawrence	Eastern end of US-59 overlap; western end of US-40 overlap; To I-70 signed westbound only
Douglas		397.273	639.349		K-32 east – Linwood, Bonner Springs	Western terminus of K-32; Bonner Springs signed westbound only
Leavenworth	Tonganoxie	406.760	654.617		K-16 west (West Fourth Street) / East Fourth Street – Oskaloosa, McLouth	Eastern terminus of K-16; McLouth signed westbound only
Wyandotte	Kansas City–Bonner Springs line	417.838– 417.856	672.445– 672.474		US-73 north / K-7 north / State Avenue – Lansing, Leavenworth	Western end of US-73 / K-7 overlap; destinations signed eastbound only; partial cloverleaf interchange
Wyandotte	Bonner Springs	419.403– 419.420	674.964– 674.991	224	I-70 west / Kansas Turnpike west / K-7 south – Topeka, Olathe	Eastern end of K-7 overlap; western end of I-70 / KTA overlap; southern terminus of US-73; Topeka signed eastbound only, Olathe westbound only
Wyandotte	Kansas City			410	110th Street – Kansas Speedway	Exit numbers follow mileage of I-70.
Wyandotte	Kansas City			411	I-435	I-435 exits 12A-B; signed as exits 411A (south) and 411B (north)
Wyandotte	Kansas City			414	78th Street	
Wyandotte	Kansas City			415	Turner Diagonal / College Parkway	Diverging diamond interchange
Wyandotte	Kansas City			417	57th Street	
Wyandotte	Kansas City			418	I-635 – St Joseph, Wichita	Signed as exits 418A (north) and 418B (south) eastbound; westbound access is part of exit 419; I-635 exits 4A-B
Wyandotte	Kansas City			419	Park Drive / 38th Street	
Wyandotte	Kansas City			420A	US-69 south (18th Street Expressway)	Western end of US-69 overlap; eastern end of Kansas Turnpike
Wyandotte	Kansas City			420B	18th Street north	
Wyandotte	Kansas City			421A	Railroad Yard – No outlet, railroad use only	Westbound exit and eastbound entrance
Wyandotte	Kansas City			421B	I-670 east to I-35 south – St. Louis	Eastbound exit and westbound entrance
Wyandotte	Kansas City			422A	US-69 north (7th Street Trafficway)	Eastern end of US-69 overlap
Wyandotte	Kansas City			422B	US-169 south (7th Street Trafficway)	Western end of US-169 overlap
Wyandotte	Kansas City			422C	Pacific Avenue	
Wyandotte	Kansas City			422D	Central Avenue	
Wyandotte	Kansas City			423A	5th Street	Eastbound exit and westbound entrance
Wyandotte	Kansas City			423B	James Street / 3rd Street	Eastbound exit and westbound entrance
Wyandotte	Kansas City			423C	Minnesota Avenue / Washington Boulevard	Westbound exit and eastbound entrance
Wyandotte	Kansas City			423D	Fairfax District	Westbound exit and eastbound entrance
Wyandotte	Kansas City				I-70 east / US 24 east / US 40 east / US 169 north – Kansas City, St. Louis	Continuation into Missouri
1.000 mi = 1.609 km; 1.000 km = 0.621 mi: Concurrency terminus; Incomplete access

U.S. Route 24
Previous state: Colorado	Kansas	Next state: Missouri
