= West Saline Township, Kansas =

Township in Sheridan County, Kansas, U.S.

West Saline Township
- Township
- Location within Sheridan County

- Location within Kansas
- Coordinates: 39°13′00″N 100°19′56″W
- Country: United States
- State: Kansas
- County: Sheridan
- Established: 1917

Area
  - Total: 71.667 sq mi (185.62 km^{2})
  - Land: 71.653 sq mi (185.58 km^{2})
  - Water: 0.014 sq mi (0.036 km^{2}) 0.02%
- Elevation: 2,680 ft (820 m)

Population (2020)
  - Total: 63
  - Density: 0.88/sq mi (0.34/km^{2})
- Time zone: UTC-6 (CST)
  - Summer (DST): UTC-5 (CDT)
- Area code: 785
- GNIS feature ID: 471272

West Saline Township is a township in Sheridan County, Kansas, United States. As of the 2020 census, its population was 63.

== History ==
West Saline Township and East Saline Township were originally part of Saline Township, which was divided in two in 1917. Saline Township had a population of 849 in the 1910 census.

== Geography ==
West Saline Township covers an area of 71.667 square miles (185.62 square kilometers). The Saline River and South Fork Solomon River flow through it.

=== Adjacent townships ===
Valley Township, Sheridan County
Kenneth Township, Sheridan County	northwest	north
Springbrook Township, Sheridan County	west	self	east	East Saline Township, Sheridan County
		south	southeast	Baker Township, Gove County
Payne Township, Gove County
