= Kenneth Township, Kansas =

Township in Sheridan County, Kansas, U.S.

Kenneth Township
- Township
- Location within Sheridan County

- Location within Kansas
- Coordinates: 39°21′00″N 100°26′12″W
- Country: United States
- State: Kansas
- County: Sheridan

Area
  - Total: 35.75 sq mi (92.6 km^{2})
  - Land: 35.75 sq mi (92.6 km^{2})
  - Water: 0 sq mi (0 km^{2}) 0%
- Elevation: 2,667 ft (813 m)

Population (2020)
  - Total: 1,382
  - Density: 38.66/sq mi (14.93/km^{2})
- Time zone: UTC-6 (CST)
  - Summer (DST): UTC-5 (CDT)
- Area code: 785
- GNIS feature ID: 471219

Kenneth Township is a township in Sheridan County, Kansas, United States. As of the 2020 census, its population was 1,382. Hoxie, the county seat of Sheridan County, is located in Kenneth Township.

== Geography ==
Kenneth Township covers an area of 35.75 square miles (92.6 square kilometers). The South Fork Solomon River flows through it, as well as Sand Creek.

=== Communities ===
- Hoxie

=== Adjacent townships ===
Parnell Township, Sheridan County
		north	northeast	Bowcreek Township, Sheridan County
Logan Township, Sheridan County	west	self	east	Valley Township, Sheridan County
		south	southeast	West Saline Township, Sheridan County
Springbrook Township, Sheridan County

== Transportation ==
=== Major highways ===
- US-24
- K-23
