= Bowcreek Township, Kansas =

Township in Sheridan County, Kansas, U.S.

Bowcreek Township
- Township
- Location within Sheridan County

- Location within Kansas
- Coordinates: 39°26′10″N 100°16′01″W
- Country: United States
- State: Kansas
- County: Sheridan

Area
  - Total: 71.843 sq mi (186.07 km^{2})
  - Land: 71.843 sq mi (186.07 km^{2})
  - Water: 0 sq mi (0 km^{2}) 0%
- Elevation: 2,621 ft (799 m)

Population (2020)
  - Total: 43
  - Density: 0.60/sq mi (0.23/km^{2})
- Time zone: UTC-6 (CST)
  - Summer (DST): UTC-5 (CDT)
- Area code: 785
- GNIS feature ID: 471223

Bowcreek Township is a township in Sheridan County, Kansas, United States. As of the 2020 census, its population was 43.

== Geography ==
Bowcreek Township covers an area of 71.843 square miles (186.07 square kilometers).

=== Adjacent townships ===
Adell Township, Sheridan County
Union Township, Sheridan County	northwest	north	northeast	Allodium Township, Graham County
Parnell Township, Sheridan County	west	self
Kenneth Township, Sheridan County	southwest	south	southeast	Gettysburg Township, Graham County
Valley Township, Sheridan County
