= Collyer Township, Kansas =

Township in Trego County, Kansas, U.S.

Collyer Township
- Township
- Location within Trego County
- Coordinates: 38.923576°N 100.061873°W
- Country: United States
- State: Kansas
- County: Trego
- Established: 1879

Area
  - Total: 299.739 sq mi (776.32 km^{2})
  - Land: 299.703 sq mi (776.23 km^{2})
  - Water: 0.036 sq mi (0.093 km^{2}) 0.01%

Population (2020)
  - Total: 319
  - Density: 1.06/sq mi (0.411/km^{2})
- Time zone: UTC-6 (CST)
  - Summer (DST): UTC-5 (CDT)
- Area code: 785
- GNIS feature ID: 471324

Collyer Township is a township in Trego County, Kansas, United States. As of the 2020 census, its population was 319.

== History ==
The townships in Trego County have been through many border and land changes throughout their history. The first three townships were created on June 26,1879. Collyer Township was the westernmost third of the county. By the 1880s, Downer Township was created from southern parts of Collyer Township and WaKeeney Township. Downer Township would later be disestablished, and Franklin Township was created from southern Collyer Township. In the 2020s, Franklin Township would be merged back into Collyer Township. The ghost town of Banner lies within the township.

== Geography ==
Collyer Township covers an area of 299.739 square miles (776.32 km^{2}), 0.01% of it water. The Smoky Hill River, Big Creek, and the Saline River and its north fork flow through it.

=== Communities ===
- Collyer
- Voda

=== Adjacent townships ===
Bryant Township, Graham County
| | | north | northeast | Happy Township, Graham County |
| Baker Township, Gove County | west | self | east | WaKeeney Township, Trego County |
| Larrabee Township, Gove County | southwest | south | southeast | Nevada Township, Ness County |
Ohio Township, Ness County

== Transportation ==
=== Major highways ===
- I-70
- US-40

== Demographics ==
As of the 2020 census, the township had a population of 319, giving a population density of 1.06 people per square mile (0.41 people/km^{2}). The racial makeup of the township was 94.7% White, 0.3% Black or African American, 0.3% Native American, 0.3% from some other race, and 4.4% from two or more races. Hispanics or Latinos of any race were 2.5% of the population.

The 2020–2024 American Community Survey estimated that the township contained 58 households and 110 housing units.
