= Harry Keith Barn =

- U.S. National Register of Historic Places
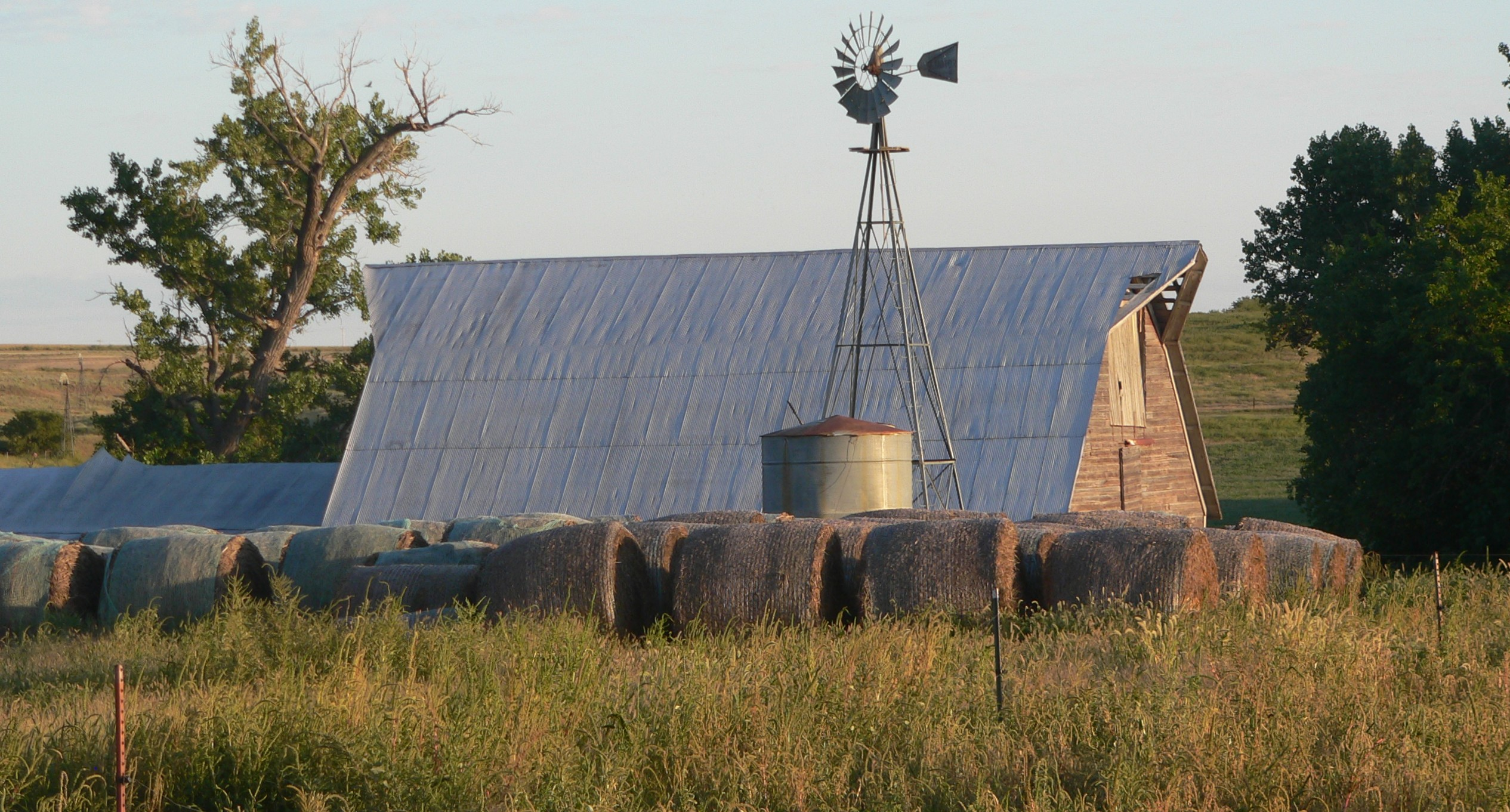
- Barn in 2014

- Location within Kansas Location within the United States
- Location: 200th Ave. & M Rd., Penokee, Kansas
- Coordinates: 39.3049°N 99.9678°W
- Area: less than one acre
- Built: 1940
- Built by: Harry Keith; et al.
- Architectural style: Gambrel-Roof Bank Barn
- MPS: Agriculture-Related Resources of Kansas MPS
- NRHP reference No.: 13000149
- Added to NRHP: April 9, 2013

The Harry Keith Barn near Penokee, Kansas was built in 1940. It was listed on the National Register of Historic Places in 2013.

It was built in October 1940 by Harry Keith (1893–1961), with his brothers and neighbors.

It is built into a hillside with entrances on two levels, thus is a bank barn. It has a gambrel roof with a hay hood at each end.

An adjacent 30 feet (9.1 m) tall Aeromotor wind pump was installed at the same time. This was probably the Aermotor 702 model which was available from 1933 on, is a contributing structure in the listing. This fills a 4,000 US gallons (15,000 L) water tank.

It's located on M Road east of 200th Avenue in Graham County, Kansas, about 3.5 miles (5.6 km) south of the unincorporated community of Penokee.

Today, the Kansas Barn Alliance offers tours of the barn during their annual BarnFest celebration.
