= Studley, Kansas =

Unincorporated community in Sheridan County, Kansas, United States

- Unincorporated community
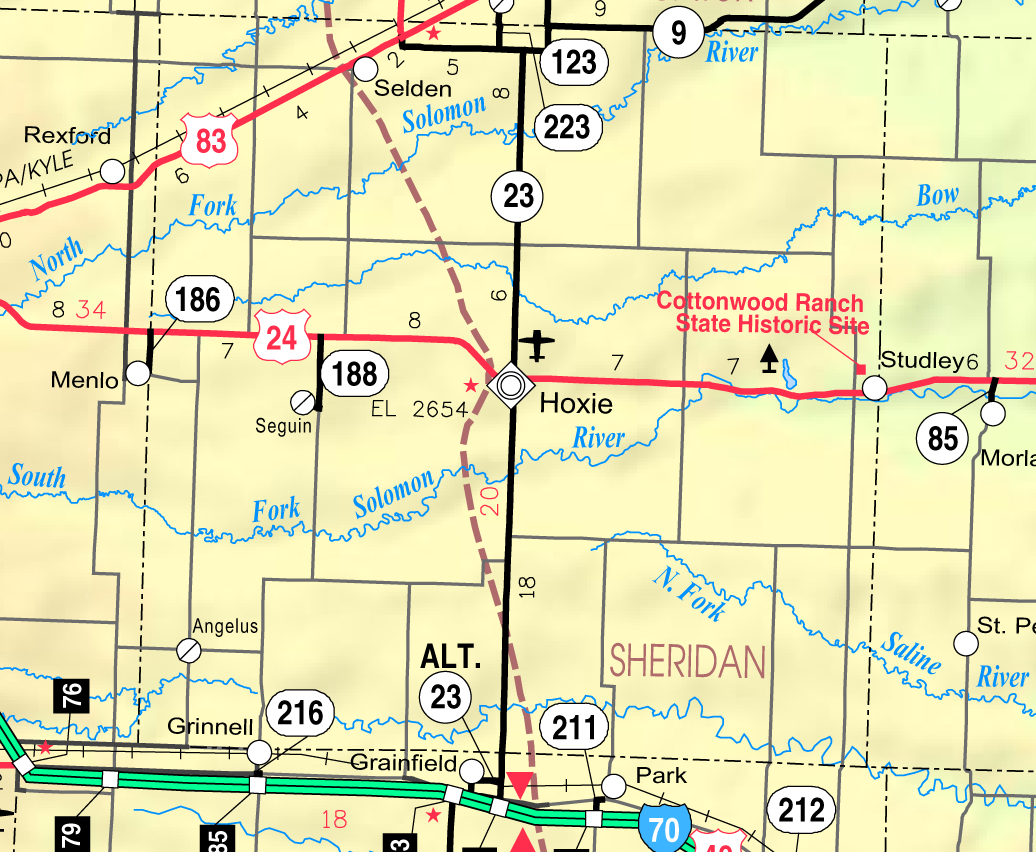
- KDOT map of Sheridan County (legend)

- Location within Kansas Location within the United States
- Coordinates: 39°21′11″N 100°09′49″W
- Country: United States
- State: Kansas
- County: Sheridan
- Named for: Studley Royal Park
- Elevation: 2,408 ft (734 m)
- Time zone: UTC-6 (CST)
  - Summer (DST): UTC-5 (CDT)
- Area code: 785
- FIPS code: 20-68700
- GNIS ID: 471292

Studley is an unincorporated community in Sheridan County, Kansas, United States, approximately 16 miles (26 km) east of Hoxie along U.S. Route 24. It is on the eastern edge of the county in Valley Township, bordering Graham County. It was named after the Studley Royal Park, in England.

== History ==
The Lincoln-Colorado Railway (which became part of the Union Pacific Railroad) came through the area in 1888 and opened a station. A post office was opened in Studley in 1889, and remained in operation until it was discontinued in 1994. Prior to 1894, the post office there was called Skelton.

Abraham Pratt, an immigrant from England, is usually credited as the founder of Studley, and he built his Cottonwood Ranch to the west of the community. With Pratt's English roots, the community was named after Studley Royal Park in England.

In 1910 it had a population of 75, but like many small western Kansas communities, its population has since declined, down to a population of 33 in the early 21st century. The community's grade school closed in the 1960s (part of the state unification plan), and its last grocery store closed in the 1970s. The 99-mile Plainville-Colby branch of the Union Pacific Railroad which passed through Studley was abandoned in 1998.

== Education ==
The community is served by Hoxie USD 412 public school district.
