= South Fork Solomon River =

River in Kansas, United States

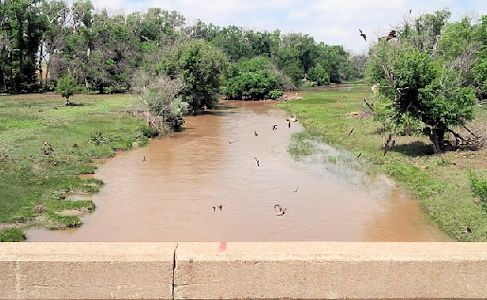
- South Fork Solomon River above Webster Reservoir

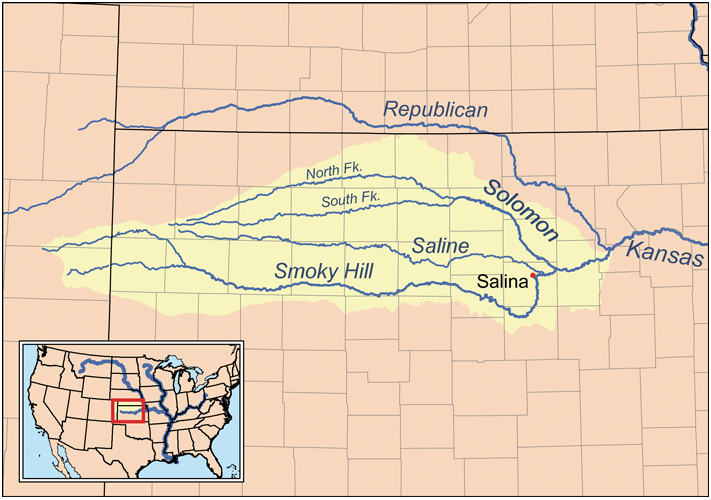
- Map of the Smoky Hill drainage basin including the South Fork Solomon River

Location
- Country: United States
- State: Kansas

Physical characteristics
- Source
  - location: Sherman County, Kansas
  - coordinates: 39°14′45″N 101°26′46″W
  - elevation: 3,503 ft (1,068 m)
- Mouth: Waconda Lake
  - location: Cawker City, Kansas
  - coordinates: 39°28′23″N 98°26′00″W
  - elevation: 1,453 ft (443 m)
- Length: 292 mi (470 km)
- Discharge
  - location: USGS 06873460 at Woodston, KS
  - average: 40.5 cu ft/s (1.15 m^{3}/s)
  - minimum: 0 cu ft/s (0 m^{3}/s)
  - maximum: 7,260 cu ft/s (206 m^{3}/s)

Basin features
- Watersheds: South Fork Solomon-Solomon-Smoky Hill-Kansas-Missouri-Mississippi

The South Fork Solomon River is a 292-mile-long (470 km) river in the central Great Plains of North America. The entire length of the river lies in the U.S. state of Kansas. It is a tributary of the Solomon River.

== Geography ==
The South Fork Solomon River rises in Sherman County, Kansas, and flows eastward through Thomas and Sheridan counties into Graham County.

The South Fork Solomon River travels across Graham County roughly following the course of Highway 24. The South Fork Solomon River enters Graham County about ½ mile (0.8 km) south of Studley and exits Graham County about 5 miles (8.0 km) southwest of Nicodemus. The river runs through Bogue, Hill City, Penokee, Morland and Studley, and is impounded eight miles west of Stockton, Kansas in Rooks County to form the large Webster Reservoir.

The river then joins the North Fork Solomon River at Waconda Lake in northwestern Mitchell County, forming the Solomon River.

== See also ==
- List of rivers of Kansas
