= Turnerville =

Turnerville may refer to:

- Turnerville, Georgia, an unincorporated community
- Turnerville, Kansas, an unincorporated community
- Turnerville, Wyoming, an unincorporated community

== See also ==
- Turnersville (disambiguation)
