= Hill City Township, Kansas =

Hill City Township
- Township
- Location in Graham County
- Coordinates: 39°23′40″N 099°48′11″W
- Country: United States
- State: Kansas
- County: Graham

Area
  - Total: 43.19 sq mi (111.86 km^{2})
  - Land: 43.12 sq mi (111.69 km^{2})
  - Water: 0.066 sq mi (0.17 km^{2}) 0.15%
- Elevation: 2,146 ft (654 m)

Population (2020)
  - Total: 1,518
  - Density: 35.20/sq mi (13.59/km^{2})
- GNIS feature ID: 0472200

Hill City Township is a township in Graham County, Kansas, United States. As of the 2020 census, its population was 1,518.

== Geography ==
Hill City Township covers an area of 43.19 square miles (111.9 km^{2}) and contains one incorporated settlement, Hill City (the county seat). According to the USGS, it contains one cemetery, Hill City Cemetery, located a short distance north of central Hill City. Another cemetery, Memorial Lawn Cemetery, lies one mile (1.6 km) north of Hill City along U.S. Route 283, just south of Hill City Cemetery.

== Transportation ==
Hill City Township contains one airport or landing strip, Hill City Municipal Airport.
