= Springbrook Township, Kansas =

Township in Sheridan County, Kansas, U.S.

Springbrook Township
- Township
- Location within Sheridan County

- Location within Kansas
- Coordinates: 39°17′30″N 100°32′32″W
- Country: United States
- State: Kansas
- County: Sheridan

Area
  - Total: 107.622 sq mi (278.74 km^{2})
  - Land: 107.614 sq mi (278.72 km^{2})
  - Water: 0.008 sq mi (0.021 km^{2}) 0.01%
- Elevation: 2,795 ft (852 m)

Population (2020)
  - Total: 59
  - Density: 0.55/sq mi (0.21/km^{2})
- Time zone: UTC-6 (CST)
  - Summer (DST): UTC-5 (CDT)
- Area code: 785
- GNIS feature ID: 471268

Springbrook Township is a township in Sheridan County, Kansas, United States. As of the 2020 census, its population was 59.

== History ==
The extinct town of Milligan, whose post office was in operation from 1880 to 1882, is located in Springbrook Township.

== Geography ==
Springbrook Township covers an area of 107.622 square miles (278.74 square kilometers). The South Fork Solomon River flows through it.

=== Adjacent townships ===
Kenneth Township, Sheridan County
Logan Township, Sheridan County	northwest	north	northeast	Valley Township, Sheridan County
Solomon Township, Sheridan County	west	self	east	West Saline Township, Sheridan County
Grinnell Township, Gove County	southwest	south	southeast	Payne Township, Gove County
Grainfield Township, Gove County

== Transportation ==
=== Major highways ===
- K-23
