= Millbrook Township =

Millbrook Township may refer to the following places in the United States:

- Millbrook Township, Peoria County, Illinois
- Millbrook Township, Graham County, Kansas
- Millbrook Township, Michigan
