= Indiana Township =

Indiana Township may refer to the following townships in the United States:

- Indiana Township, Graham County, Kansas
- Indiana Township, Allegheny County, Pennsylvania
