= Millbrook, Kansas =

Luctor, Kansas
- Ghost town
- Location within state of Kansas
- Coordinates: 39°21′00″N 99°52′11″W
- Country: United States
- State: Kansas
- County: Graham
- Elevation: 2,162 ft (659 m)

Population
  - Total: 0
- Time zone: UTC-6 (CST)
  - Summer (DST): UTC-5 (CDT)
- GNIS ID: 481947

Millbrook is a ghost town in Graham County, Kansas, United States.

== History ==
Graham County was organized for administrative purposes on April 1, 1880, with 1500 inhabitants in the county and with the first county seat located at Millbrook. The appointed commissioners were: E. C. Moses and O. G. Nevins. The first election was held on June 1.

=== After 1887 tornado ===
Millbrook was destroyed by a tornado on August 4, 1887.

The county seat was moved to Hill City on March 10, 1888. J.R. Pomeroy, who assisted Mr. Hill in developing Hill City, donated most of the tract of land on which the courthouse was built. This site is still being used for a modern courthouse.

Hill City was chosen as the permanent county seat, and the following representatives were elected: J. L. Walton; commissioners, A. Morton, G. W. Morehouse, and J. N. Glover.

The post office in Millbrook was established December 5, 1878 and was discontinued August 31, 1889.

=== Today ===
The ruins of the limestone schoolhouse still mark the site of where Millbrook once stood, southwest of Hill City.
