= Bogue, Kansas =

City in Graham County, Kansas, United States

- City
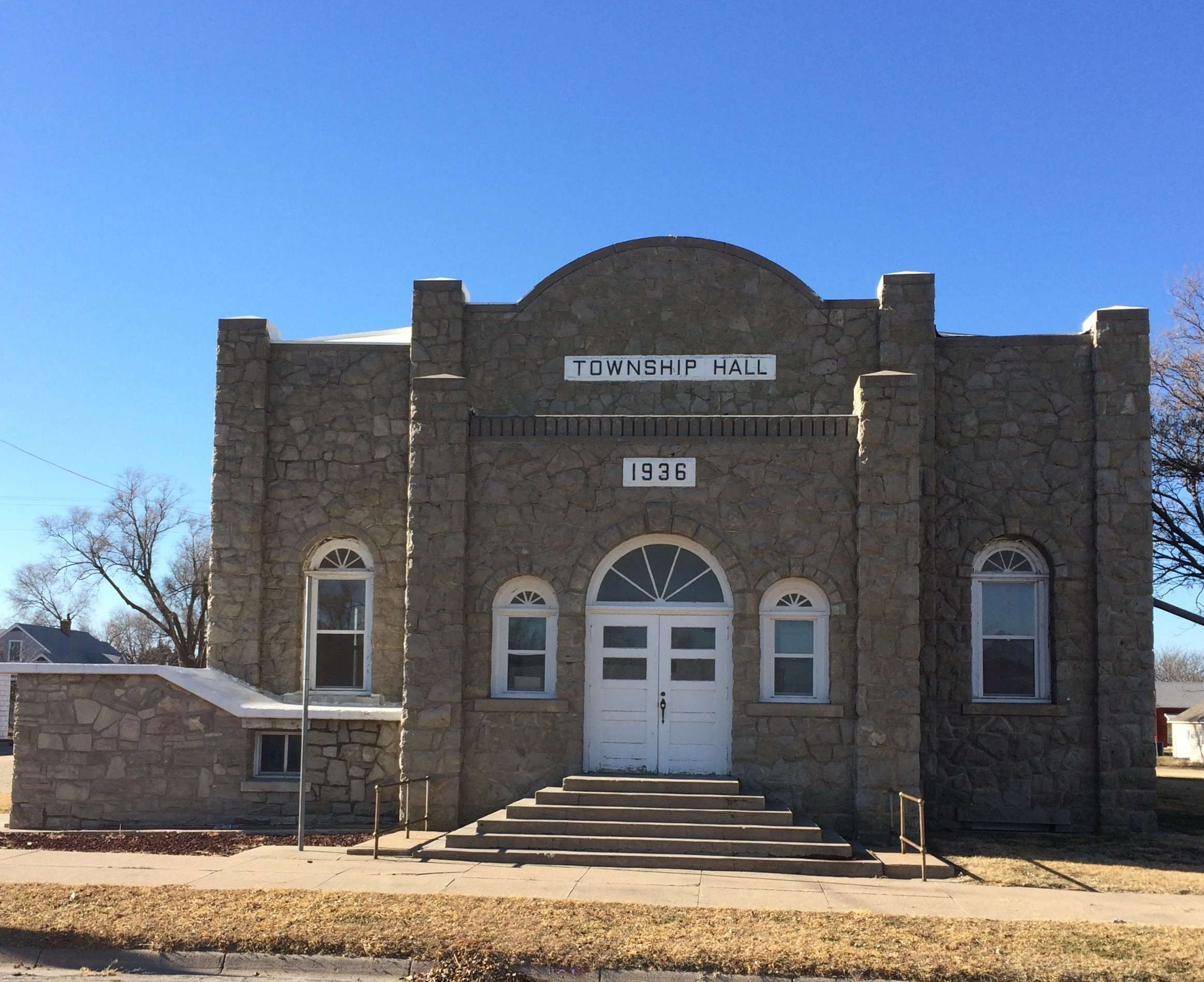
- Bogue Township Hall (1936)

- Location within Graham County and Kansas

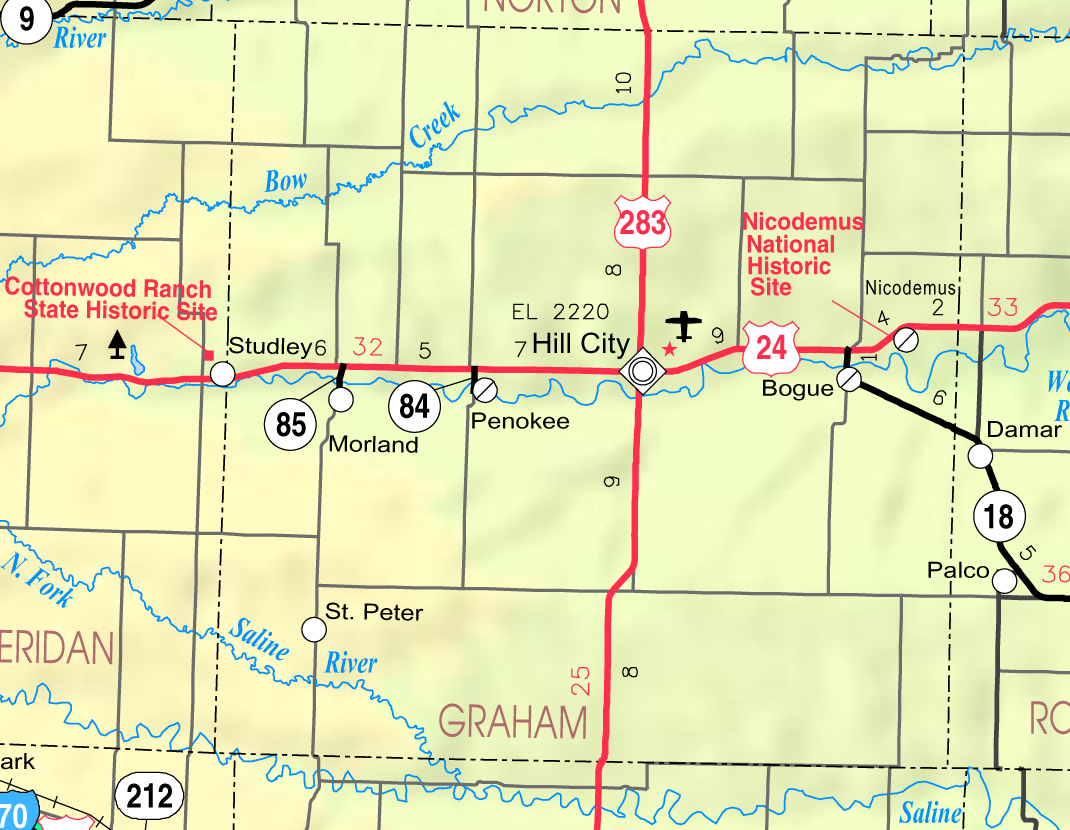
- KDOT map of Graham County (legend)
- Coordinates: 39°21′34″N 99°41′15″W
- Country: United States
- State: Kansas
- County: Graham
- Founded: 1888
- Incorporated: 1935
- Named for: Virgil Bogue

Area
  - Total: 0.26 sq mi (0.67 km^{2})
  - Land: 0.26 sq mi (0.67 km^{2})
  - Water: 0 sq mi (0.00 km^{2})
- Elevation: 2,047 ft (624 m)

Population (2020)
  - Total: 155
  - Density: 600/sq mi (230/km^{2})
- Time zone: UTC-6 (CST)
  - Summer (DST): UTC-5 (CDT)
- ZIP Code: 67625
- Area code: 785
- FIPS code: 20-07825
- GNIS ID: 2394214
- Website: City website

Bogue is a city in Graham County, Kansas, United States. As of the 2020 census, the population of the city was 155. Bogue is located on K-18, south of U.S. Route 24, on the South Fork Solomon River.

== History ==
Bogue was established in 1888 as a railroad town. It originally was named Wild Horse but the Union Pacific Railroad changed the name to honor Virgil Gay Bogue, a civil engineer working for the railroad and the founder of the city.

The first post office in Bogue was established in September 1888. It was moved from Fagan.

== Geography ==
According to the United States Census Bureau, the city has a total area of 0.26 square miles (0.67 km^{2}), all land.

=== Climate ===
The climate in this area is characterized by hot, humid summers and generally mild to cool winters. According to the Köppen Climate Classification system, Bogue has a humid subtropical climate, abbreviated "Cfa" on climate maps.

== Demographics ==
Historical population
Census	Pop.	Note	%±
1940	157		—
1950	211		34.4%
1960	234		10.9%
1970	257		9.8%
1980	197		−23.3%
1990	150		−23.9%
2000	179		19.3%
2010	143		−20.1%
2020	155		8.4%
U.S. Decennial Census

=== 2020 census ===
The 2020 United States census counted 155 people, 71 households, and 38 families in Bogue. The population density was 598.5 per square mile (231.1/km^{2}). There were 91 housing units at an average density of 351.4 per square mile (135.7/km^{2}). The racial makeup was 82.58% (128) white or European American (80.65% non-Hispanic white), 5.16% (8) black or African-American, 2.58% (4) Native American or Alaska Native, 0.0% (0) Asian, 0.0% (0) Pacific Islander or Native Hawaiian, 0.0% (0) from other races, and 9.68% (15) from two or more races. Hispanic or Latino of any race was 1.94% (3) of the population.

Of the 71 households, 15.5% had children under the age of 18; 42.3% were married couples living together; 25.4% had a female householder with no spouse or partner present. 40.8% of households consisted of individuals and 21.1% had someone living alone who was 65 years of age or older. The average household size was 1.6 and the average family size was 2.3. The percent of those with a bachelor's degree or higher was estimated to be 19.4% of the population.

25.2% of the population was under the age of 18, 2.6% from 18 to 24, 20.0% from 25 to 44, 23.2% from 45 to 64, and 29.0% who were 65 years of age or older. The median age was 49.5 years. For every 100 females, there were 101.3 males. For every 100 females ages 18 and older, there were 118.9 males.

The 2016–2020 5-year American Community Survey estimates show that the median household income was $36,875 (with a margin of error of +/- $7,630) and the median family income was $43,750 (+/- $7,027). Males had a median income of $16,250 (+/- $6,282) versus $26,818 (+/- $6,311) for females. The median income for those above 16 years old was $25,682 (+/- $5,878). Approximately, 15.4% of families and 19.4% of the population were below the poverty line, including 66.7% of those under the age of 18 and 0.0% of those ages 65 or over.

=== 2010 census ===
As of the census of 2010, there were 143 people, 75 households, and 43 families residing in the city. The population density was 550.0 inhabitants per square mile (212.4/km^{2}). There were 89 housing units at an average density of 342.3 per square mile (132.2/km^{2}). The racial makeup of the city was 93.7% White, 2.8% African American, 2.1% Asian, and 1.4% from two or more races. Hispanic or Latino of any race were 1.4% of the population.

There were 75 households, of which 13.3% had children under the age of 18 living with them, 54.7% were married couples living together, 1.3% had a female householder with no husband present, 1.3% had a male householder with no wife present, and 42.7% were non-families. 36.0% of all households were made up of individuals, and 14.6% had someone living alone who was 65 years of age or older. The average household size was 1.91 and the average family size was 2.42.

The median age in the city was 54.3 years. 10.5% of residents were under the age of 18; 4.2% were between the ages of 18 and 24; 18.2% were from 25 to 44; 32.2% were from 45 to 64; and 35% were 65 years of age or older. The gender makeup of the city was 48.3% male and 51.7% female.

== Education ==
The community is served by Graham County USD 281 public school district. The district high school is located in Hill City.

Bogue High School was closed in 1978 through school unification. The Bogue High School mascot was Bluejays. The Bogue Bluejays won the following Kansas State High School championships:

- 1969 Boys Track & Field (Indoor) – 1A
- 1976 Football – 8-Man
- 1977 Boys Track & Field (Indoor) – 1A
