= Solomon Township =

Solomon Township may refer to the following townships in the United States:

- Solomon Township, Cloud County, Kansas
- Solomon Township, Graham County, Kansas
- Solomon Township, Sheridan County, Kansas
