= Houston, Kansas =

- Ghost town
- Location within the state of Kansas Houston (the United States)
- Coordinates: 39°33′45″N 99°48′21″W
- Country: United States
- State: Kansas
- County: Graham
- Elevation: 2,274 ft (693 m)
- Time zone: UTC-6 (Central (CST))
  - Summer (DST): UTC-5 (CDT)
- GNIS ID: 482219

Houston is a ghost town in Graham Township, Graham County, Kansas, United States.

== History ==
Houston was issued a post office in 1875. The post office was discontinued in 1887.
