= Fargo, Kansas =

- Ghost town
- Location within the state of Kansas Fargo (the United States)
- Coordinates: 39°14′05″N 99°44′07″W
- Country: United States
- State: Kansas
- County: Graham
- Elevation: 2,349 ft (716 m)
- Time zone: UTC-6 (Central (CST))
  - Summer (DST): UTC-5 (CDT)
- GNIS ID: 485339

Fargo is a ghost town in Graham County, Kansas, United States.

== History ==
Fargo was issued a post office in 1880. The post office was discontinued in 1890.
