= Graham Township, Kansas =

Graham Township
- Township
- Location in Graham County
- Coordinates: 39°32′15″N 099°49′01″W
- Country: United States
- State: Kansas
- County: Graham

Area
  - Total: 71.83 sq mi (186.04 km^{2})
  - Land: 72 sq mi (186 km^{2})
  - Water: 0.015 sq mi (0.04 km^{2}) 0.02%
- Elevation: 2,385 ft (727 m)

Population (2020)
  - Total: 51
  - Density: 0.71/sq mi (0.27/km^{2})
- GNIS feature ID: 0472119

Graham Township is a township in Graham County, Kansas, United States. As of the 2020 census, its population was 51.

== Geography ==
Graham Township covers an area of 71.83 square miles (186.0 km^{2}) and contains no incorporated settlements. According to the USGS, it contains one cemetery, Roscoe.
