= Parnell Township, Kansas =

Township in Sheridan County, Kansas, U.S.

Parnell Township
- Township
- Location within Sheridan County

- Location within Kansas
- Coordinates: 39°26′15″N 100°30′32″W
- Country: United States
- State: Kansas
- County: Sheridan

Area
  - Total: 71.326 sq mi (184.73 km^{2})
  - Land: 71.301 sq mi (184.67 km^{2})
  - Water: 0.025 sq mi (0.065 km^{2}) 0.04%
- Elevation: 2,812 ft (857 m)

Population (2020)
  - Total: 91
  - Density: 1.3/sq mi (0.49/km^{2})
- Time zone: UTC-6 (CST)
  - Summer (DST): UTC-5 (CDT)
- Area code: 785
- GNIS feature ID: 471218

Parnell Township is a township in Sheridan County, Kansas, United States. As of the 2020 census, its population was 91.

== Geography ==
Parnell Township covers an area of 71.326 square miles (184.73 square kilometers).

=== Adjacent townships ===
Sheridan Township, Sheridan County
Prairie Dog Township, Sheridan County	northwest	north	northeast	Union Township, Sheridan County
Bloomfield Township, Sheridan County	west	self	east	Bowcreek Township, Sheridan County
Logan Township, Sheridan County	southwest	south	southeast	Valley Township, Sheridan County
Kenneth Township, Sheridan County

== Transportation ==
=== Major highways ===
- K-23
