= Whitfield, Kansas =

- Ghost town
- Location within the state of Kansas Whitfield (the United States)
- Coordinates: 39°33′15″N 99°40′04″W
- Country: United States
- State: Kansas
- County: Graham
- Elevation: 2,185 ft (666 m)
- Time zone: UTC-6 (Central (CST))
  - Summer (DST): UTC-5 (CDT)
- GNIS ID: 482220

Whitfield is a ghost town in Graham County, Kansas, United States.

== History ==
The Graham post office was moved to Whitfield in 1879. The post office was discontinued in 1889.
