= Olean, Kansas =

- Ghost town
- Location within the state of Kansas Olean (the United States)
- Coordinates: 39°15′52″N 100°02′26″W
- Country: United States
- State: Kansas
- County: Graham
- Elevation: 2,510 ft (765 m)
- Time zone: UTC-6 (Central (CST))
  - Summer (DST): UTC-5 (CDT)
- GNIS ID: 482223

Olean is a ghost town in Graham County, Kansas, United States.

== History ==
Olene was issued a post office in 1879. The post office name was changed to Olean in 1880, then moved to Leland in 1888.
