= Wild Horse, Kansas =

- Ghost town
- Location within the state of Kansas Wild Horse (the United States)
- Coordinates: 39°20′08″N 99°44′51″W
- Country: United States
- State: Kansas
- County: Graham
- Elevation: 2,162 ft (659 m)
- Time zone: UTC-6 (Central (CST))
  - Summer (DST): UTC-5 (CDT)
- GNIS ID: 482225

Wild Horse is a ghost town in Graham County, Kansas, United States.

== History ==
Wild Horse was issued a post office in 1879. The post office was discontinued in 1887.
