= Togo, Kansas =

- Ghost town
- Location within the state of Kansas Togo (the United States)
- Coordinates: 39°11′00″N 99°51′58″W
- Country: United States
- State: Kansas
- County: Graham
- Elevation: 2,360 ft (720 m)
- Time zone: UTC-6 (Central (CST))
  - Summer (DST): UTC-5 (CDT)
- GNIS ID: 484599

Togo is a ghost town in Graham County, Kansas, United States.

== History ==
Togo was issued a post office in 1905. The post office was discontinued in 1910. The population in 1910 was 20.
