= Turnersville =

Turnersville may refer to:

- Turnersville, New Jersey, an unincorporated community
- Turnersville, Tennessee, an unincorporated community
- Turnersville, Texas, a town

== See also ==
- Turnerville (disambiguation)
