= Kebar, Kansas =

- Ghost town
- Location within the state of Kansas Kebar (the United States)
- Coordinates: 39°17′35″N 99°39′44″W
- Country: United States
- State: Kansas
- County: Graham
- Elevation: 2,123 ft (647 m)
- Time zone: UTC-6 (Central (CST))
  - Summer (DST): UTC-5 (CDT)
- GNIS ID: 482226

Kebar is a ghost town in Graham County, Kansas, United States.

== History ==
Kebar was issued a post office in 1880. The post office was discontinued in 1898.
