= Union Township, Sheridan County, Kansas =

Township in Sheridan County, Kansas, U.S.

Union Township
- Township
- Location within Sheridan County

- Location within Kansas
- Coordinates: 39°31′30″N 100°22′47″W
- Country: United States
- State: Kansas
- County: Sheridan

Area
  - Total: 35.695 sq mi (92.45 km^{2})
  - Land: 35.695 sq mi (92.45 km^{2})
  - Water: 0 sq mi (0 km^{2}) 0%
- Elevation: 2,625 ft (800 m)

Population (2020)
  - Total: 33
  - Density: 0.92/sq mi (0.36/km^{2})
- Time zone: UTC-6 (CST)
  - Summer (DST): UTC-5 (CDT)
- Area code: 785
- GNIS ID: 471109

Union Township is a township in Sheridan County, Kansas, United States. As of the 2020 census, its population was 33.

== Geography ==
Union Township covers an area of 35.695 square miles (92.45 square kilometers).

=== Adjacent townships ===
Dresden Township, Decatur County	northwest		northeast	Lyon Township, Decatur County
Sheridan Township, Sheridan County	west	self	east	Adell Township, Sheridan County
Parnell Township, Sheridan County	southwest		southeast	Bowcreek Township, Sheridan County

== Transportation ==
=== Major highways ===
- K-9
- K-23
- K-123
