= Nicodemus Township, Kansas =

Nicodemus Township
- Township
- Location in Graham County
- Coordinates: 39°23′50″N 099°40′01″W
- Country: United States
- State: Kansas
- County: Graham

Area
  - Total: 32.33 sq mi (83.74 km^{2})
  - Land: 32.32 sq mi (83.72 km^{2})
  - Water: 0.012 sq mi (0.03 km^{2}) 0.04%
- Elevation: 2,080 ft (630 m)

Population (2020)
  - Total: 43
  - Density: 1.3/sq mi (0.51/km^{2})
- GNIS ID: 0472210

Nicodemus Township is a township in Graham County, Kansas, United States. At the 2020 census, its population was 43.

== Geography ==
Nicodemus Township covers an area of 32.33 square miles (83.7 km^{2}) and contains no incorporated settlements. According to the USGS, it contains two cemeteries: Mount Olive and Nicodemus.

The streams of Sand Creek and Spring Creek run through this township.
