= Roscoe, Kansas =

- Ghost town
- Location within the state of Kansas Roscoe (the United States)
- Coordinates: 39°28′51″N 99°46′10″W
- Country: United States
- State: Kansas
- County: Graham
- Elevation: 2,306 ft (703 m)
- Time zone: UTC-6 (Central (CST))
  - Summer (DST): UTC-5 (CDT)
- GNIS ID: 484591

Roscoe is a ghost town in Hill City Township, Graham County, Kansas, United States.

== History ==
Roscoe was issued a post office in 1879. The post office was discontinued in 1893. The old Roscoe Cemetery still exists just northeast of Hill City and is maintained by multiple residents of Hill City.
