= Indiana Township, Graham County, Kansas =

Indiana Township
- Township
- Location in Graham County
- Coordinates: 39°31′30″N 099°57′06″W
- Country: United States
- State: Kansas
- County: Graham

Area
  - Total: 67.02 sq mi (173.58 km^{2})
  - Land: 67.02 sq mi (173.57 km^{2})
  - Water: 0.0039 sq mi (0.01 km^{2}) 0.01%
- Elevation: 2,421 ft (738 m)

Population (2020)
  - Total: 26
  - Density: 0.39/sq mi (0.15/km^{2})
- GNIS feature ID: 0471116

Indiana Township is a township in Graham County, Kansas, United States. As of the 2020 census, its population was 26.

== Geography ==
Indiana Township covers an area of 67.02 square miles (173.6 km^{2}) and contains no incorporated settlements. According to the USGS, it contains one cemetery, South Star.
