= Turnerville, Kansas =

- Ghost town
- Location within the state of Kansas Turnerville (the United States)
- Coordinates: 39°18′20″N 99°58′01″W
- Country: United States
- State: Kansas
- County: Graham
- Elevation: 2,372 ft (723 m)
- Time zone: UTC-6 (Central (CST))
  - Summer (DST): UTC-5 (CDT)
- GNIS ID: 482224

Turnerville is a ghost town in Graham County, Kansas, United States.

== History ==
Turnerville was issued a post office in 1883. The post office was discontinued in 1889.
