= Happy, Kansas =

- Ghost town
- Location within the state of Kansas Happy (the United States)
- Coordinates: 39°10′50″N 99°54′11″W
- Country: United States
- State: Kansas
- County: Graham
- Elevation: 2,369 ft (722 m)
- Time zone: UTC-6 (Central (CST))
  - Summer (DST): UTC-5 (CDT)
- GNIS ID: 482227

Happy is a ghost town in Happy Township, Graham County, Kansas, United States.

== History ==
Happy was issued a post office in 1883. The post office was discontinued in 1906.
