= Morlan Township, Kansas =

Morlan Township
- Township
- Location in Graham County
- Coordinates: 39°12′40″N 099°42′01″W
- Country: United States
- State: Kansas
- County: Graham

Area
  - Total: 110.6 sq mi (286.5 km^{2})
  - Land: 110.56 sq mi (286.35 km^{2})
  - Water: 0.058 sq mi (0.15 km^{2}) 0.05%
- Elevation: 2,303 ft (702 m)

Population (2020)
  - Total: 51
  - Density: 0.46/sq mi (0.18/km^{2})
- GNIS feature ID: 0485524

Morlan Township is a township in Graham County, Kansas, United States. As of the 2020 census, its population was 51.

== Geography ==
Morlan Township covers an area of 110.62 square miles (286.5 km^{2}) and contains no incorporated settlements. According to the USGS, it contains two cemeteries: Morlan Township and Redline.
