= Allodium Township, Kansas =

Allodium Township
- Township
- Location in Graham County
- Coordinates: 39°31′30″N 100°05′16″W
- Country: United States
- State: Kansas
- County: Graham

Area
  - Total: 67.47 sq mi (174.74 km^{2})
  - Land: 67.43 sq mi (174.64 km^{2})
  - Water: 0.039 sq mi (0.1 km^{2}) 0.06%
- Elevation: 2,566 ft (782 m)

Population (2020)
  - Total: 36
  - Density: 0.53/sq mi (0.21/km^{2})
- GNIS feature ID: 0471114

Allodium Township is a township in Graham County, Kansas, United States. As of the 2020 census, its population was 36.

== Geography ==
Allodium Township covers an area of 67.47 square miles (174.7 km^{2}) and contains no incorporated settlements.
