= Graham County USD 281 =

Public school district in Hill City, Kansas

Address
- 117 N. Third Ave. Hill City, Kansas, 67642; United States
- Coordinates: 39°21′57″N 99°50′38″W

District information
- Type: Public
- Grades: K to 12
- Schools: 3

Other information
- Website: usd281.com

Graham County USD 281 is a public unified school district headquartered in Hill City, Kansas, United States. The district includes the communities of Hill City, Bogue, Morland, Nicodemus, Penokee, St. Peter, and nearby rural areas.

== Schools ==
The school district operates the following schools:

- Hill City Junior-Senior High School
- Hill City Elementary School
- Graham County Learning Center

== History ==
It was previously known as Hill City USD 281.

In 2002, it absorbed Morland USD 280.

It previously operated Longfellow Middle School.

== Athletics ==
The Hill City High School mascot is Ringnecks.

The Hill City Ringnecks have won the following Kansas State High School championships:

- 1969 Boys Track & Field - Class 2A
- 1970 Boys Basketball - Class 2A
- 1970 Boys Track & Field - Class 2A
- 1971 Boys Track & Field - Class 2A
- 1976 Girls Basketball - Class 2A
- 1976 Girls Track & Field - Class 2A
- 1978 Boys Basketball - Class 2A
- 1978 Boys Track & Field - Class 2A
- 1979 Boys Track & Field - Class 2A
- 1997 Boys Track & Field - Class 2A
- 1998 Boys Basketball - Class 2A

== See also ==
- Kansas State Department of Education
- Kansas State High School Activities Association
- List of high schools in Kansas
- List of unified school districts in Kansas
