= Millbrook Township, Kansas =

Millbrook Township
- Township
- Location in Graham County
- Coordinates: 39°18′10″N 099°53′01″W
- Country: United States
- State: Kansas
- County: Graham

Area
  - Total: 61.59 sq mi (159.53 km^{2})
  - Land: 61.57 sq mi (159.47 km^{2})
  - Water: 0.023 sq mi (0.06 km^{2}) 0.04%
- Elevation: 2,244 ft (684 m)

Population (2020)
  - Total: 90
  - Density: 1.5/sq mi (0.56/km^{2})
- GNIS feature ID: 0472351

Millbrook Township is a township in Graham County, Kansas, United States. As of the 2020 census, its population was 90.

== Geography ==
Millbrook Township covers an area of 61.59 square miles (159.5 km^{2}) and contains no incorporated settlements. According to the USGS, it contains two cemeteries: Brush Creek and Penokee.

The streams of Brush Creek and Jackson Branch run through this township.
