= Happy Township, Kansas =

Happy Township
- Township
- Location in Graham County
- Coordinates: 39°12′20″N 099°53′01″W
- Country: United States
- State: Kansas
- County: Graham

Area
  - Total: 90.13 sq mi (233.44 km^{2})
  - Land: 90.09 sq mi (233.33 km^{2})
  - Water: 0.042 sq mi (0.11 km^{2}) 0.05%
- Elevation: 2,431 ft (741 m)

Population (2020)
  - Total: 59
  - Density: 0.65/sq mi (0.25/km^{2})
- GNIS feature ID: 0472352

Happy Township is a township in Graham County, Kansas, United States. As of the 2020 census, its population was 59.

== Geography ==
Happy Township covers an area of 90.13 square miles (233.4 km^{2}) and contains no incorporated settlements. According to the USGS, it contains one cemetery, Prairie Home.

== See also ==
- Happy, Kansas
