= St. Peter, Kansas =

Unincorporated community in Graham County, Kansas, United States

- Unincorporated community
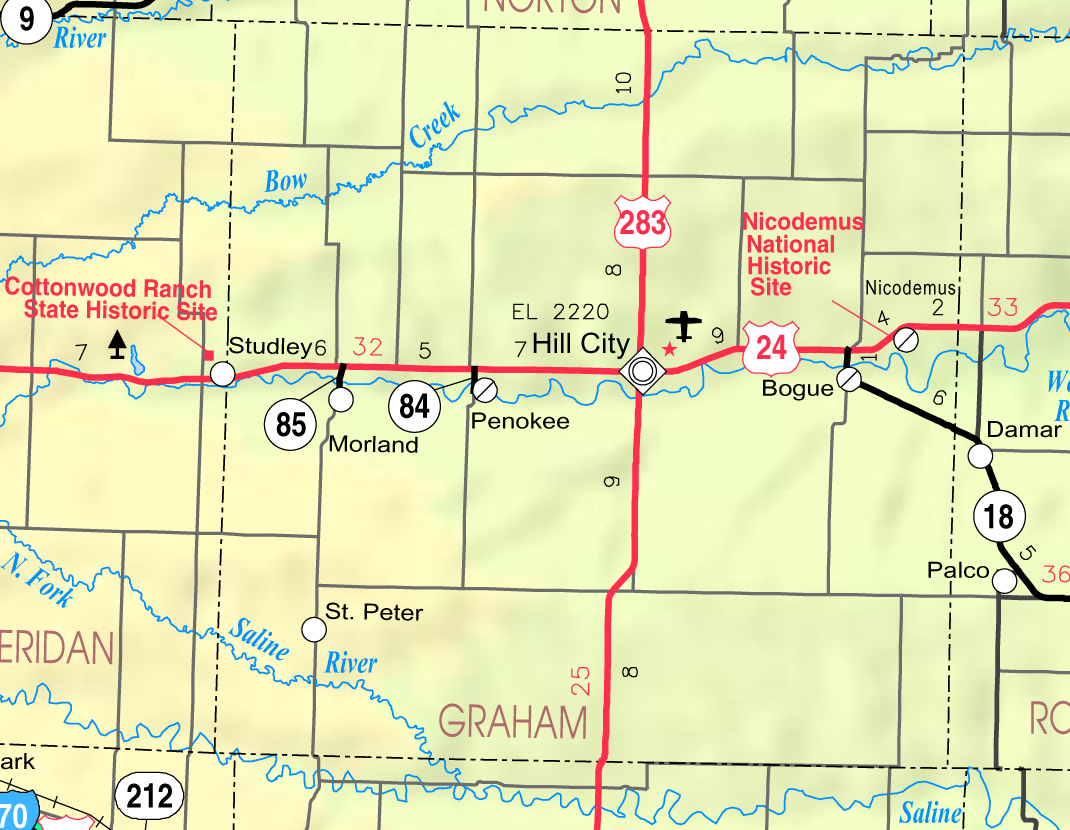
- KDOT map of Graham County (legend)

- Location within Kansas Location within the United States
- Coordinates: 39°11′23″N 100°5′21″W
- Country: United States
- State: Kansas
- County: Graham
- Elevation: 2,494 ft (760 m)
- Time zone: UTC-6 (CST)
  - Summer (DST): UTC-5 (CDT)
- Area code: 785
- FIPS code: 20-62525
- GNIS ID: 471325

St. Peter is an unincorporated community in Graham County, Kansas, United States.

== History ==
The community was originally named Hoganville. The post office in St. Peter, established in 1894 as Hoganville, was discontinued in 1920. The population in 1910 was 50.

== Education ==
The community is served by the Graham County USD 281 public school district.
