= Gettysburg Township, Kansas =

Gettysburg Township
- Township
- Location in Graham County
- Coordinates: 39°23′10″N 100°02′01″W
- Country: United States
- State: Kansas
- County: Graham

Area
  - Total: 87.75 sq mi (227.28 km^{2})
  - Land: 87.72 sq mi (227.19 km^{2})
  - Water: 0.035 sq mi (0.09 km^{2}) 0.04%
- Elevation: 2,398 ft (731 m)

Population (2020)
  - Total: 71
  - Density: 0.81/sq mi (0.31/km^{2})
- GNIS feature ID: 0471228

Gettysburg Township is a township in Graham County, Kansas, United States. As of the 2020 census, its population was 71.

== Geography ==
Gettysburg Township covers an area of 87.75 square miles (227.3 km^{2}) and contains no incorporated settlements. According to the USGS, it contains two cemeteries: Anderson and Rock Creek.

The streams of Antelope Creek, Keys Creek, Rock Creek and Youngs Creek run through this township.
