= Solomon Township, Graham County, Kansas =

Solomon Township
- Township
- Location in Graham County
- Coordinates: 39°18′00″N 100°04′11″W
- Country: United States
- State: Kansas
- County: Graham

Area
  - Total: 61.41 sq mi (159.06 km^{2})
  - Land: 61.41 sq mi (159.04 km^{2})
  - Water: 0.0077 sq mi (0.02 km^{2}) 0.01%
- Elevation: 2,536 ft (773 m)

Population (2020)
  - Total: 145
  - Density: 2.36/sq mi (0.912/km^{2})
- GNIS feature ID: 0471281

Solomon Township is a township in Graham County, Kansas, United States. As of the 2020 census, its population was 145.

== Geography ==
Solomon Township covers an area of 61.42 square miles (159.1 km^{2}) and contains one incorporated settlement, Morland. According to the USGS, it contains one cemetery, Marland.

The streams of County Line Creek and Southeast Fork County Line Creek run through this township.
