= Bryant Township, Kansas =

Bryant Township
- Township
- Location in Graham County
- Coordinates: 39°13′00″N 100°04′31″W
- Country: United States
- State: Kansas
- County: Graham

Area
  - Total: 90.06 sq mi (233.26 km^{2})
  - Land: 90.02 sq mi (233.16 km^{2})
  - Water: 0.039 sq mi (0.1 km^{2}) 0.04%
- Elevation: 2,523 ft (769 m)

Population (2020)
  - Total: 80
  - Density: 0.89/sq mi (0.34/km^{2})
- GNIS feature ID: 0471280

Bryant Township is a township in Graham County, Kansas, United States.

== Demographics ==
As of the 2020 census, its population was 80.

== Geography ==
Bryant Township covers an area of 90.06 square miles (233.3 km^{2}) and contains no incorporated settlements. According to the USGS, it contains two cemeteries: Leland and Saint Anthony.
