= Penokee, Kansas =

Unincorporated community in Graham County, Kansas

- Unincorporated community
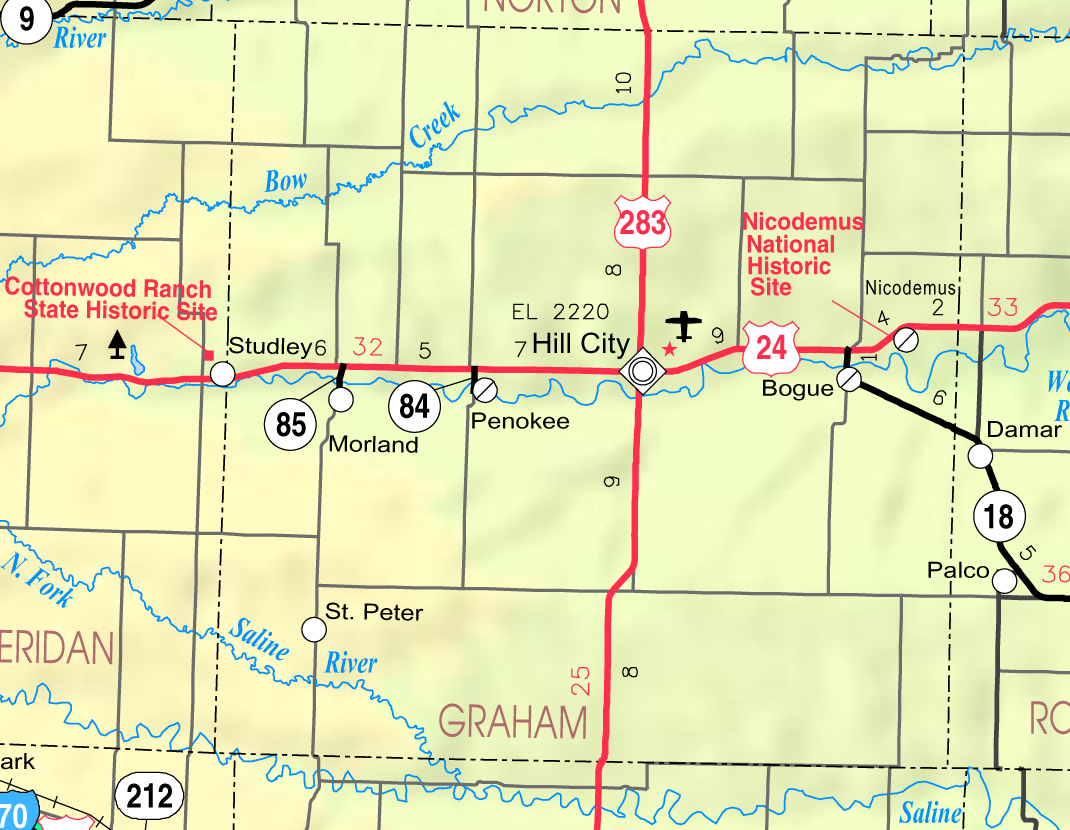
- KDOT map of Graham County (legend)

- Location within Kansas Location within the United States
- Coordinates: 39°21′4″N 99°58′20″W
- Country: United States
- State: Kansas
- County: Graham
- Founded: 1880s
- Platted: 1888
- Elevation: 2,225 ft (678 m)
- Time zone: UTC-6 (CST)
  - Summer (DST): UTC-5 (CDT)
- ZIP Code: 67659
- Area code: 785
- FIPS code: 20-55375
- GNIS ID: 472354

Penokee is an unincorporated community in Graham County, Kansas, United States, in the Solomon Valley.

== History ==
The community was originally named Reford and platted in 1888 when the railroad was extended to that point. Because the town became mistaken for Rexford, Kansas, the residents renamed their town after the Penokee Mountains near Lake Superior.

== Education ==
The community is served by Graham County USD 281 public school district.
