= Graham County, Kansas =

County in Kansas, United States

- County
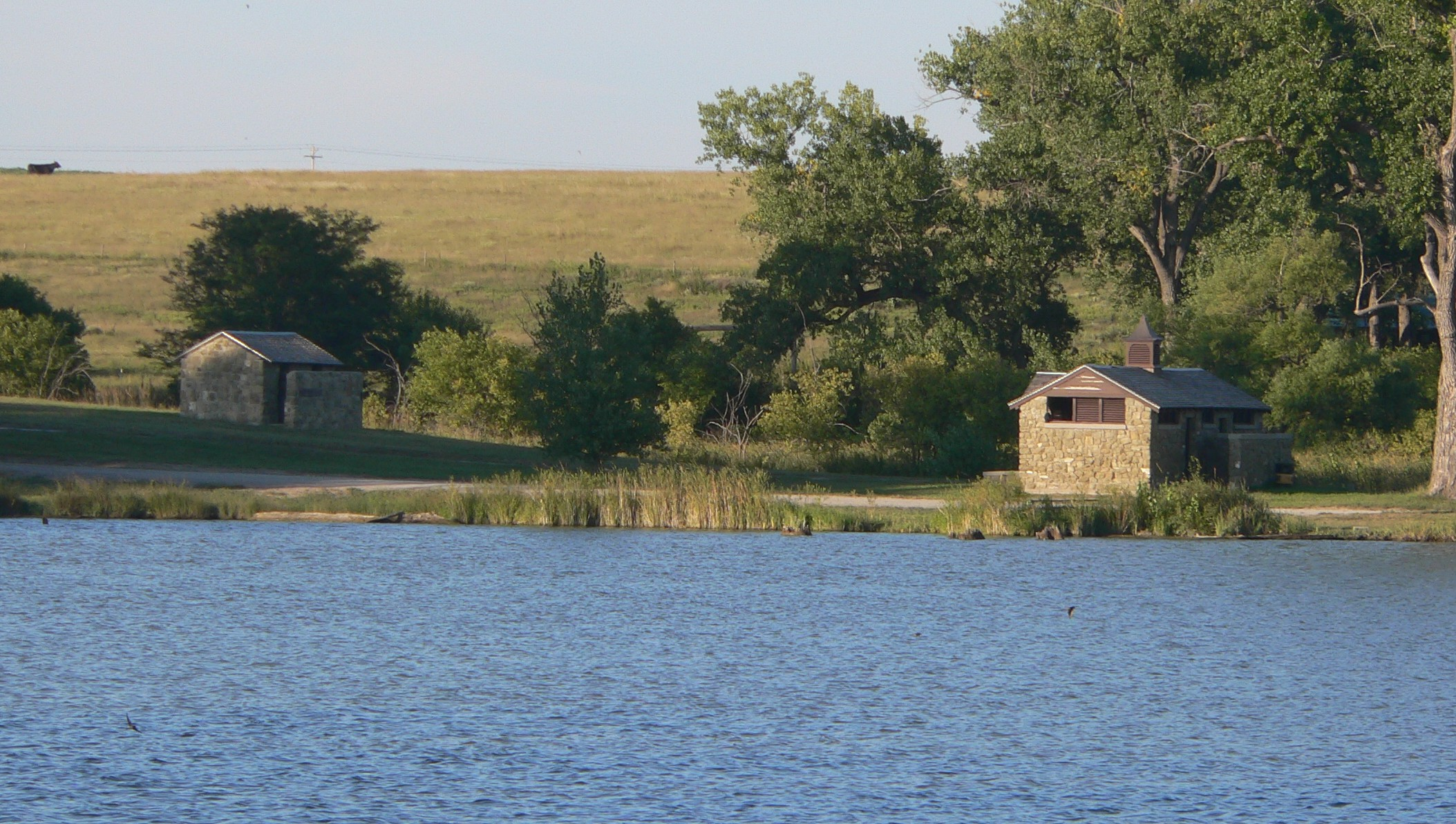
- Antelope Lake Park near Morland (2014)

- Location within the U.S. state of Kansas
- Coordinates: 39°21′N 99°53′W
- Country: United States
- State: Kansas
- Founded: February 26, 1887
- Named for: John L. Graham
- Seat: Hill City
- Largest city: Hill City

Area
  - Total: 899 sq mi (2,330 km^{2})
  - Land: 899 sq mi (2,330 km^{2})
  - Water: 0.2 sq mi (0.52 km^{2}) 0.03%

Population (2020)
  - Estimate (2025): 2,371 ▼
  - Density: 2.7/sq mi (1.0/km^{2})
- Time zone: UTC−6 (Central)
  - Summer (DST): UTC−5 (CDT)
- Congressional district: 1st
- Website: grahamcountyks.com

Graham County is a county located in the U.S. state of Kansas. Its county seat and most populous city is Hill City. As of the 2020 census, the county population was 2,415. The county was named for John Graham, a captain in the Civil War who died during the Battle of Chickamauga. The county is home to Nicodemus, founded in 1877, which is the only remaining western town established by African Americans during the Reconstruction period following the Civil War.

== History ==
=== Early history ===
For many millennia, the Great Plains of North America was inhabited by nomadic Native Americans. From the 16th century to 18th century, the Kingdom of France claimed ownership of large parts of North America. In 1762, after the French and Indian War, France secretly ceded New France to Spain, per the Treaty of Fontainebleau.

=== 19th century ===
In 1802, Spain returned most of the land to France, but keeping title to about 7,500 square miles. In 1803, most of the land for modern day Kansas was acquired by the United States from France as part of the 828,000 square mile Louisiana Purchase for 2.83 cents per acre.

In 1854, the Kansas Territory was organized, then in 1861 Kansas became the 34th U.S. state. Graham County was organized in 1880. In 1887, Graham County was established and named for Captain John L. Graham, a Union soldier killed in action at the Battle of Chickamauga in Tennessee on September 19, 1863.

== Geography ==
According to the U.S. Census Bureau, the county has a total area of 899 square miles (2,330 km^{2}), of which 899 square miles (2,330 km^{2}) is land and 0.2 square miles (0.52 km^{2}) (0.03%) is water.

Graham County roughly contains 3600 quarter sections, and is the fourth county east of Colorado line and the second county south of the Nebraska line. The 100th meridian west passes nearly through its center. The average elevation in the county is 2,700 feet (820 m) above sea level. It is intersected by the south fork of Solomon River, and drained by Saline River.

=== Adjacent counties ===
- Norton County (north)
- Phillips County (northeast)
- Rooks County (east)
- Ellis County (southeast)
- Trego County (south)
- Gove County (southwest)
- Sheridan County (west)
- Decatur County (northwest)

=== National protected area ===
- Nicodemus National Historic Site

== Demographics ==
Historical population
Census	Pop.	Note	%±
1880	4,258		—
1890	5,029		18.1%
1900	5,173		2.9%
1910	8,700		68.2%
1920	7,624		−12.4%
1930	7,772		1.9%
1940	6,071		−21.9%
1950	5,020		−17.3%
1960	5,586		11.3%
1970	4,751		−14.9%
1980	3,995		−15.9%
1990	3,543		−11.3%
2000	2,946		−16.9%
2010	2,597		−11.8%
2020	2,415		−7.0%
2025 (est.)	2,371	▼	−1.8%
U.S. Decennial Census; 1790-1960 1900-1990; 1990-2000 2010-2020

=== Racial and ethnic composition ===
Graham County, Kansas – Racial and ethnic composition Note: the US Census treats Hispanic/Latino as an ethnic category. This table excludes Latinos from the racial categories and assigns them to a separate category. Hispanics/Latinos may be of any race.
Race / Ethnicity (NH = Non-Hispanic)	Pop 1980	Pop 1990	Pop 2000	Pop 2010	Pop 2020	% 1980	% 1990	% 2000	% 2010	% 2020
White alone (NH)	3,832	3,393	2,790	2,357	2,179	95.92%	95.77%	94.70%	90.76%	90.23%
Black or African American alone (NH)	133	102	95	96	55	3.33%	2.88%	3.22%	3.70%	2.28%
Native American or Alaska Native alone (NH)	2	13	10	13	8	0.05%	0.37%	0.34%	0.50%	0.33%
Asian alone (NH)	9	12	8	6	14	0.23%	0.34%	0.27%	0.23%	0.58%
Native Hawaiian or Pacific Islander alone (NH)	x	x	0	0	0	x	x	0.00%	0.00%	0.00%
Other race alone (NH)	2	0	0	1	14	0.05%	0.00%	0.00%	0.04%	0.58%
Mixed race or Multiracial (NH)	x	x	20	65	83	x	x	0.68%	2.50%	3.44%
Hispanic or Latino (any race)	17	23	23	59	62	0.43%	0.65%	0.78%	2.27%	2.57%
Total	3,995	3,543	2,946	2,597	2,415	100.00%	100.00%	100.00%	100.00%	100.00%

=== 2020 census ===
As of the 2020 census, the county had a population of 2,415 and a median age of 50.4 years; 21.0% of residents were under the age of 18 while 27.7% were 65 years of age or older. For every 100 females there were 98.8 males and 95.7 males for every 100 females age 18 and over. None of the population lived in urban areas while 100.0% lived in rural areas.

The racial makeup of the county was 91.6% White, 2.4% Black or African American, 0.6% American Indian and Alaska Native, 0.6% Asian, 0.1% Native Hawaiian and Pacific Islander, 0.6% from some other race, and 4.2% from two or more races. Hispanic or Latino residents of any race comprised 2.6% of the population.

There were 1,103 households in the county, of which 24.8% had children under the age of 18 living with them and 24.8% had a female householder with no spouse or partner present. About 34.0% of all households were made up of individuals and 19.0% had someone living alone who was 65 years of age or older.

There were 1,422 housing units, of which 22.4% were vacant. Among occupied housing units, 74.7% were owner-occupied and 25.3% were renter-occupied. The homeowner vacancy rate was 1.6% and the rental vacancy rate was 7.4%.

=== 2000 census ===
As of the 2000 census, there were 2,946 people, 1,263 households, and 847 families residing in the county. The population density was 3 people per square mile (1.2 people/km^{2}). There were 1,553 housing units at an average density of 2 per square mile (0.77/km^{2}). The racial makeup of the county was 94.91% White, 3.22% Black or African American, 0.34% Native American, 0.27% Asian, 0.03% Pacific Islander, 0.41% from other races, and 0.81% from two or more races. Hispanic or Latino of any race were 0.78% of the population.

There were 1,263 households, out of which 27.40% had children under the age of 18 living with them, 59.50% were married couples living together, 5.90% had a female householder with no husband present, and 32.90% were non-families. 30.10% of all households were made up of individuals, and 16.70% had someone living alone who was 65 years of age or older. The average household size was 2.28 and the average family size was 2.84.

In the county, the population was spread out, with 22.50% under the age of 18, 5.30% from 18 to 24, 23.10% from 25 to 44, 25.40% from 45 to 64, and 23.70% who were 65 years of age or older. The median age was 44 years. For every 100 females there were 95.10 males. For every 100 females age 18 and over, there were 92.20 males.

The median income for a household in the county was $31,286, and the median income for a family was $38,036. Males had a median income of $26,642 versus $18,222 for females. The per capita income for the county was $18,050. About 8.60% of families and 11.50% of the population were below the poverty line, including 13.60% of those under age 18 and 10.40% of those age 65 or over.

== Government ==
=== Presidential elections ===
Presidential election results

United States presidential election results for Graham County, Kansas
Year	Republican		Democratic		Third party(ies)	
Year	No.	%	No.	%	No.	%
1888	797	49.35%	342	21.18%	476	29.47%
1892	436	44.40%	0	0.00%	546	55.60%
1896	343	34.33%	648	64.86%	8	0.80%
1900	561	44.03%	694	54.47%	19	1.49%
1904	921	64.72%	244	17.15%	258	18.13%
1908	911	52.24%	723	41.46%	110	6.31%
1912	327	20.27%	636	39.43%	650	40.30%
1916	1,150	35.63%	1,801	55.79%	277	8.58%
1920	1,658	64.06%	762	29.44%	168	6.49%
1924	1,631	53.78%	629	20.74%	773	25.49%
1928	1,832	61.68%	1,087	36.60%	51	1.72%
1932	1,284	37.07%	2,082	60.10%	98	2.83%
1936	1,462	45.66%	1,734	54.15%	6	0.19%
1940	1,804	60.97%	1,135	38.36%	20	0.68%
1944	1,651	66.52%	814	32.80%	17	0.68%
1948	1,380	59.28%	913	39.22%	35	1.50%
1952	1,859	72.62%	686	26.80%	15	0.59%
1956	1,676	69.49%	725	30.06%	11	0.46%
1960	1,572	62.96%	918	36.76%	7	0.28%
1964	1,194	49.58%	1,193	49.54%	21	0.87%
1968	1,308	60.72%	597	27.72%	249	11.56%
1972	1,440	73.32%	488	24.85%	36	1.83%
1976	1,112	53.26%	936	44.83%	40	1.92%
1980	1,450	70.90%	473	23.13%	122	5.97%
1984	1,423	74.00%	480	24.96%	20	1.04%
1988	1,139	60.97%	702	37.58%	27	1.45%
1992	752	39.33%	554	28.97%	606	31.69%
1996	1,031	63.41%	432	26.57%	163	10.02%
2000	1,058	71.78%	346	23.47%	70	4.75%
2004	1,082	75.14%	334	23.19%	24	1.67%
2008	1,060	74.49%	325	22.84%	38	2.67%
2012	1,056	78.81%	256	19.10%	28	2.09%
2016	1,025	79.83%	188	14.64%	71	5.53%
2020	1,080	80.78%	228	17.05%	29	2.17%
2024	1,055	81.97%	210	16.32%	22	1.71%

=== Laws ===
Following amendment to the Kansas Constitution in 1986, Graham County remained a prohibition, or "dry", county until 1992, when voters approved the sale of alcoholic liquor by the individual drink without a food sales requirement.

== Education ==
=== Unified school districts ===
- Graham County USD 281

== Communities ==
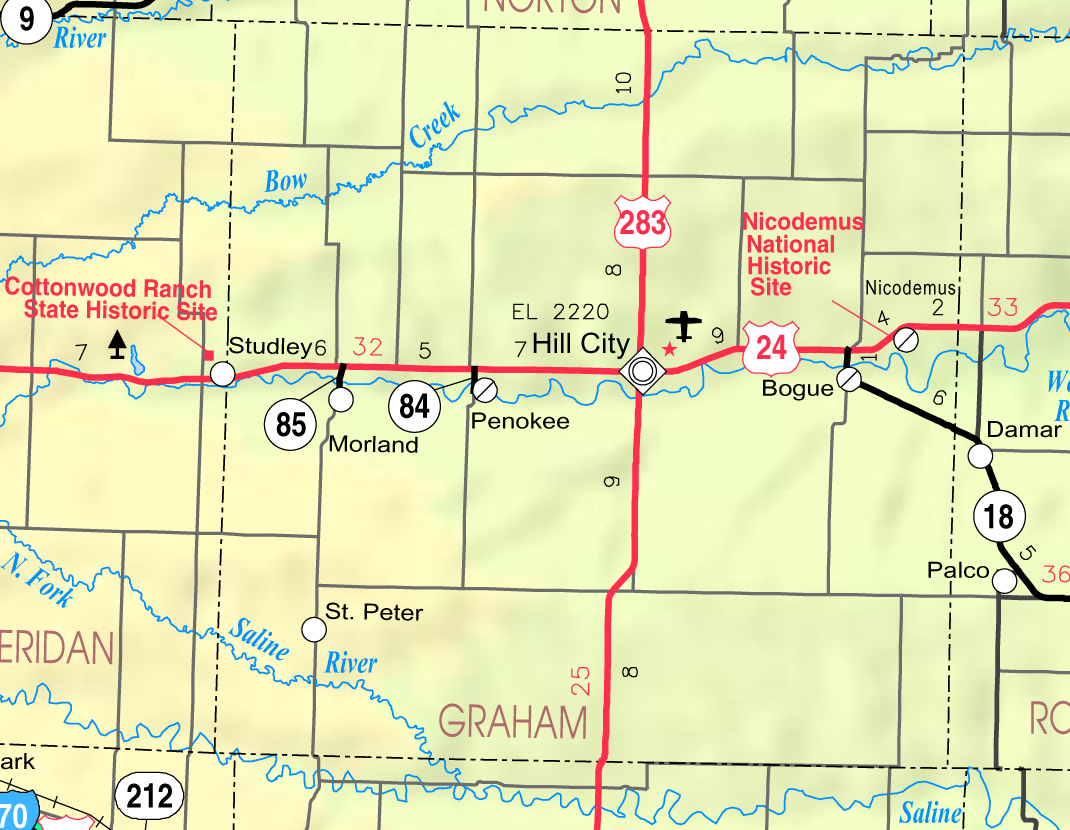
2005 map of Graham County (map legend)

List of townships / incorporated cities / unincorporated communities / extinct former communities within Graham County.

=== Cities ===
- Bogue
- Hill City (county seat)
- Morland

=== Unincorporated communities ===
† means a community is designated a Census-Designated Place (CDP) by the United States Census Bureau.

- Nicodemus†
- Penokee
- St. Peter

=== Ghost towns ===
- Fargo
- Happy
- Houston
- Kebar
- Millbrook
- Olean
- Roscoe
- Togo
- Turnerville
- Whitfield
- Wild Horse

=== Townships ===
Graham County is divided into thirteen townships. None of the cities within the county are considered governmentally independent, and all figures for the townships include those of the cities. In the following table, the population center is the largest city (or cities) included in that township's population total, if it is of a significant size.

Township	FIPS	Population center	Population	Population density /km^{2} (/sq mi)	Land area km^{2} (sq mi)	Water area km^{2} (sq mi)	Water %	Geographic coordinates
Allodium	01325		46	0 (1)	175 (67)	0 (0)	0.06%	39°29′23″N 100°4′42″W
Bryant	08850		115	0 (1)	233 (90)	0 (0)	0.04%	39°11′22″N 100°5′7″W
Gettysburg	26175		83	0 (1)	227 (88)	0 (0)	0.04%	39°23′11″N 100°1′50″W
Graham	27175		53	0 (1)	186 (72)	0 (0)	0.02%	39°31′3″N 99°47′51″W
Happy	29950		72	0 (1)	233 (90)	0 (0)	0.05%	39°12′17″N 99°53′7″W
Hill City	32200	Hill City	1,747	16 (41)	112 (43)	0 (0)	0.15%	39°22′17″N 99°50′29″W
Indiana	34000		42	0 (1)	174 (67)	0 (0)	0.01%	39°29′28″N 99°57′59″W
Millbrook	46625		150	1 (2)	159 (62)	0 (0)	0.04%	39°19′1″N 99°55′2″W
Morland	48250		68	0 (1)	286 (111)	0 (0)	0.05%	39°13′46″N 99°41′15″W
Nicodemus	50575		52	1 (2)	84 (32)	0 (0)	0.03%	39°24′40″N 99°38′55″W
Pioneer	55900		57	0 (1)	161 (62)	0 (0)	0.02%	39°31′1″N 99°40′2″W
Solomon	66300	Morland	209	1 (3)	159 (61)	0 (0)	0.01%	39°18′57″N 100°4′44″W
Wildhorse	79225	Bogue	252	2 (5)	137 (53)	0 (0)	0.06%	39°20′45″N 99°40′13″W
Sources: "Census 2000 U.S. Gazetteer Files". U.S. Census Bureau, Geography Division. Archived from the original on August 2, 2002.

== In art ==
Noted regional artist Birger Sandzén frequently painted landscapes in Graham County, where his wife's parents moved in 1906. Examples include Still Water currently profiled in the collection at Kansas State University's Marianna Kistler Beach Museum of Art which depicts Wild Horse Creek in the county.

== See also ==
- USS Graham County (LST-1176)

Community information for Kansas

- Kansas locations by per capita income
- List of counties in Kansas
- List of townships in Kansas
- List of cities in Kansas
- List of unincorporated communities in Kansas
- List of ghost towns in Kansas
