= Baker Township, Gove County, Kansas =

Baker Township
- Township
- Location in Gove County
- Coordinates: 39°00′06″N 100°12′51″W
- Country: United States
- State: Kansas
- County: Gove

Area
  - Total: 125.05 sq mi (323.89 km^{2})
  - Land: 125.05 sq mi (323.87 km^{2})
  - Water: 0.0077 sq mi (0.02 km^{2}) 0.01%
- Elevation: 2,585 ft (788 m)

Population (2020)
  - Total: 1,276
  - Density: 10.20/sq mi (3.940/km^{2})
- GNIS ID: 471318

Baker Township is a township in Gove County, Kansas, United States. As of the 2020 census, its population was 1,276.

== Geography ==
Baker Township covers an area of 125.05 square miles (323.9 km^{2}) and contains one incorporated settlement, Quinter. According to the USGS, it contains three cemeteries: Old Order German Baptist, Quinter and Red Top.

== Transportation ==
Baker Township contains one airport or landing strip, Quinter Air Strip.
