= Morland, Kansas =

City in Graham County, Kansas, United States

- City
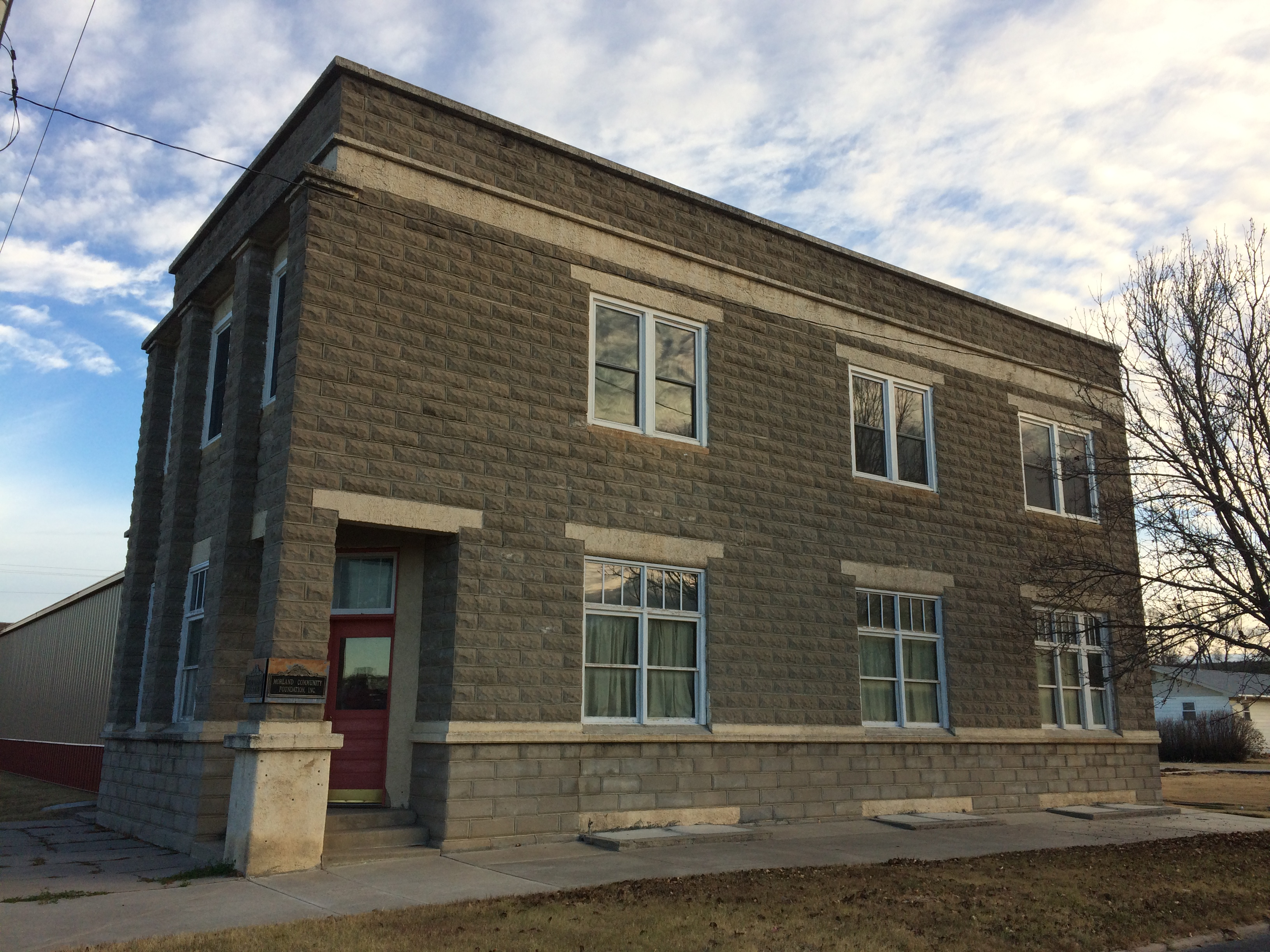
- Morland Community Foundation building (2017)

- Location within Graham County and Kansas

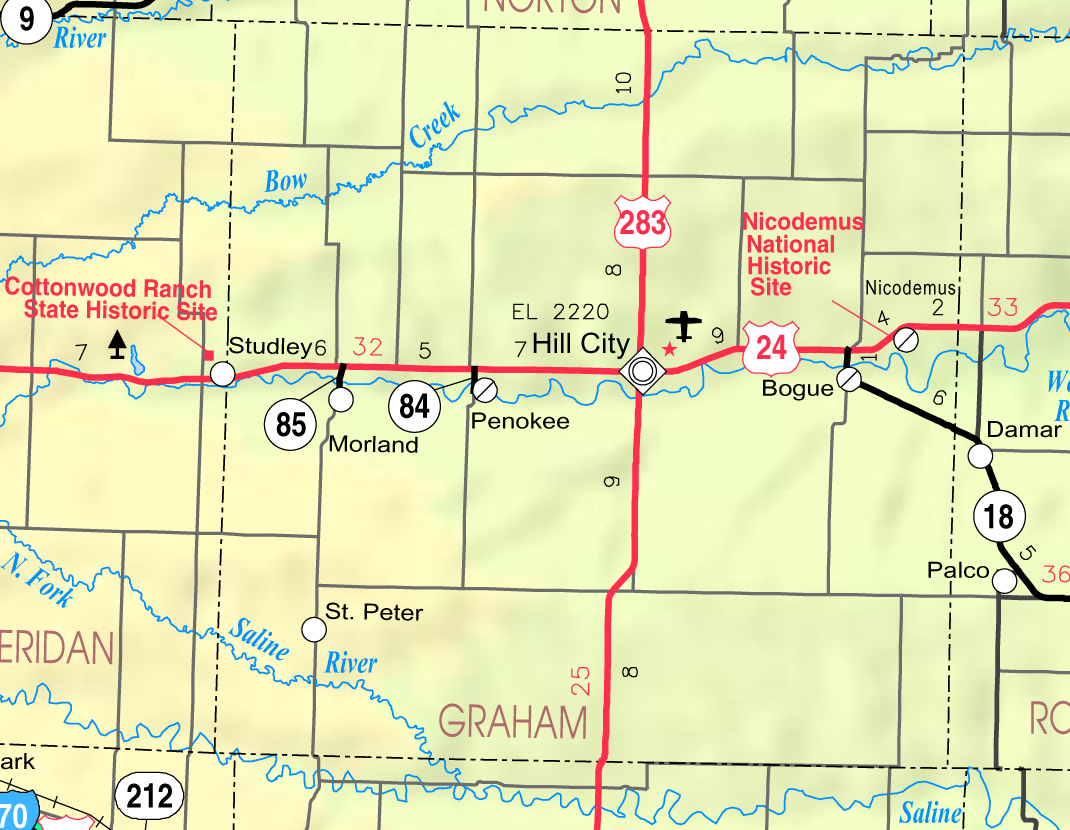
- KDOT map of Graham County (legend)
- Coordinates: 39°20′56″N 100°04′28″W
- Country: United States
- State: Kansas
- County: Graham
- Founded: 1884 (Fremont)
- Incorporated: 1906 (Morland)

Area
  - Total: 0.48 sq mi (1.24 km^{2})
  - Land: 0.48 sq mi (1.24 km^{2})
  - Water: 0 sq mi (0.00 km^{2})
- Elevation: 2,303 ft (702 m)

Population (2020)
  - Total: 115
  - Density: 240/sq mi (92.7/km^{2})
- Time zone: UTC-6 (CST)
  - Summer (DST): UTC-5 (CDT)
- ZIP Code: 67650
- Area code: 785
- FIPS code: 20-48275
- GNIS ID: 2395402

Morland is a city in Graham County, Kansas, United States. As of the 2020 census, the population of the city was 115.

== History ==
The community was originally called Fremont when it was founded in 1884 and named after John C. Fremont. In order to avoid repetition with another Kansas community named "Fremont", the name was changed to Kalula in 1888, and was changed yet again to Morland in 1892. Morland was named for a railroad employee.

== Geography ==
According to the United States Census Bureau, the city has a total area of 0.47 square miles (1.22 km^{2}), all land.

== Demographics ==
Historical population
Census	Pop.	Note	%±
1910	237		—
1920	296		24.9%
1930	385		30.1%
1940	356		−7.5%
1950	287		−19.4%
1960	317		10.5%
1970	300		−5.4%
1980	223		−25.7%
1990	234		4.9%
2000	164		−29.9%
2010	154		−6.1%
2020	115		−25.3%
U.S. Decennial Census

=== 2020 census ===
The 2020 United States census counted 115 people, 73 households, and 40 families in Morland. The population density was 240.6 per square mile (92.9/km^{2}). There were 81 housing units at an average density of 169.5 per square mile (65.4/km^{2}). The racial makeup was 97.39% (112) white or European American (94.78% non-Hispanic white), 0.0% (0) black or African-American, 0.0% (0) Native American or Alaska Native, 0.0% (0) Asian, 0.0% (0) Pacific Islander or Native Hawaiian, 0.0% (0) from other races, and 2.61% (3) from two or more races. Hispanic or Latino of any race was 2.61% (3) of the population.

Of the 73 households, 21.9% had children under the age of 18; 43.8% were married couples living together; 26.0% had a female householder with no spouse or partner present. 37.0% of households consisted of individuals and 17.8% had someone living alone who was 65 years of age or older. The average household size was 1.8 and the average family size was 2.4. The percent of those with a bachelor's degree or higher was estimated to be 48.7% of the population.

12.2% of the population was under the age of 18, 3.5% from 18 to 24, 15.7% from 25 to 44, 40.9% from 45 to 64, and 27.8% who were 65 years of age or older. The median age was 55.3 years. For every 100 females, there were 109.1 males. For every 100 females ages 18 and older, there were 106.1 males.

The 2016–2020 5-year American Community Survey estimates show that the median household income was $57,083 (with a margin of error of +/- $20,267) and the median family income was $71,042 (+/- $13,624). Males had a median income of $38,125 (+/- $9,578) versus $34,464 (+/- $11,267) for females. The median income for those above 16 years old was $37,500 (+/- $10,167). Approximately, 11.3% of families and 13.7% of the population were below the poverty line, including 34.6% of those under the age of 18 and 0.0% of those ages 65 or over.

=== 2010 census ===
As of the census of 2010, there were 154 people, 77 households, and 47 families residing in the city. The population density was 327.7 inhabitants per square mile (126.5/km^{2}). There were 89 housing units at an average density of 189.4 per square mile (73.1/km^{2}). The racial makeup of the city was 95.5% White, 1.9% Native American, and 2.6% from two or more races.

There were 77 households, of which 20.8% had children under the age of 18 living with them, 51.9% were married couples living together, 6.5% had a female householder with no husband present, 2.6% had a male householder with no wife present, and 39.0% were non-families. 32.5% of all households were made up of individuals, and 11.7% had someone living alone who was 65 years of age or older. The average household size was 2.00 and the average family size was 2.49.

The median age in the city was 51 years. 14.9% of residents were under the age of 18; 6.4% were between the ages of 18 and 24; 13.5% were from 25 to 44; 38.2% were from 45 to 64; and 26.6% were 65 years of age or older. The gender makeup of the city was 47.4% male and 52.6% female.

== Education ==
The community is served by Graham County USD 281 public school district, formerly known as Hill City USD 281. It absorbed Morland USD 280 in 2002.

Morland schools were closed through school unification. The Morland High School mascot was Morland Tigers. The Morland Tigers won the Kansas State High School class 1A volleyball championship in 1974 and 1975.
