= Hill City, Kansas =

City in Graham County, Kansas

- City and County seat
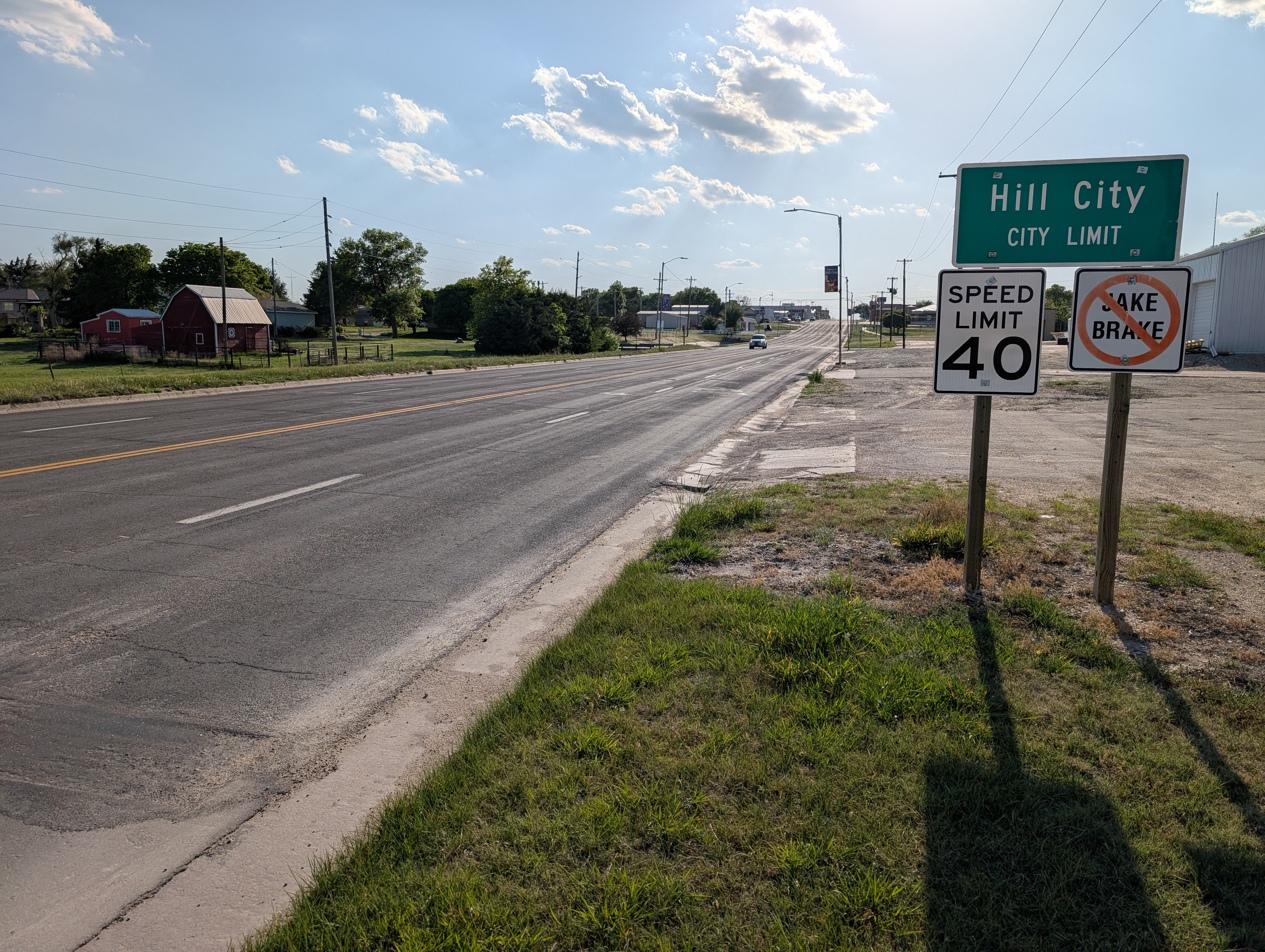
- City limit sign in Hill City (2025)

- Location within Graham County and Kansas

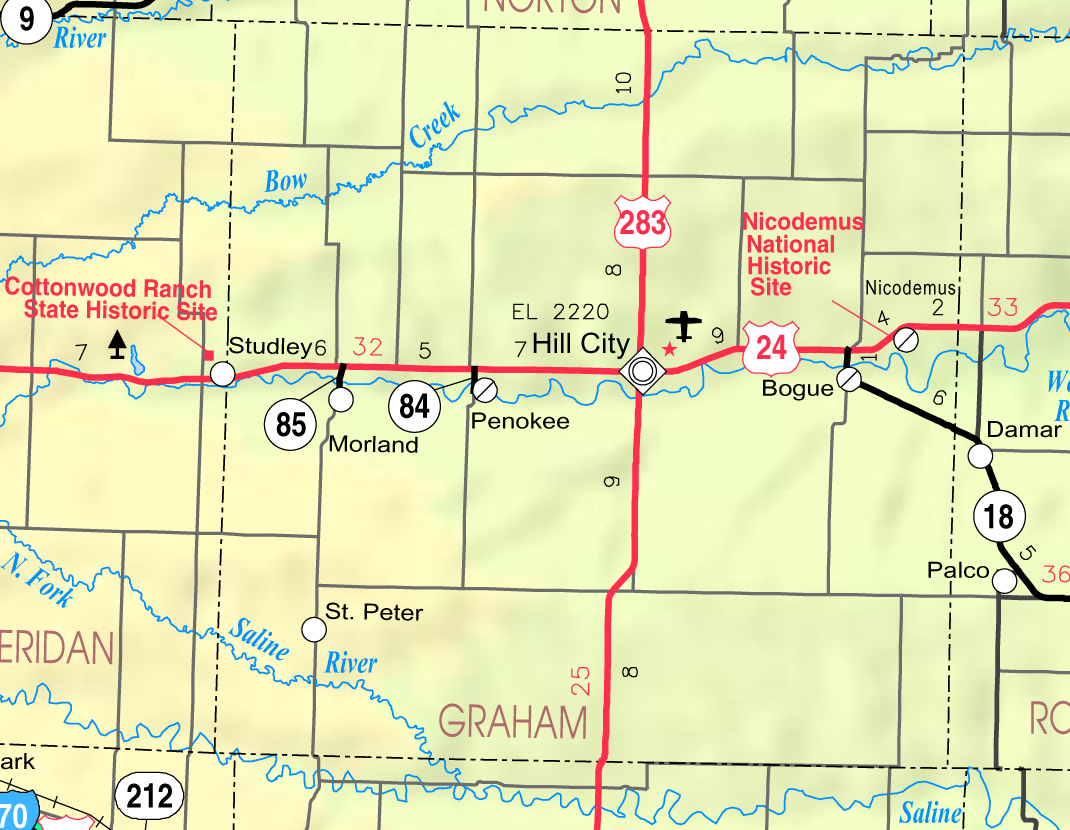
- KDOT map of Graham County (legend)
- Coordinates: 39°22′02″N 99°50′44″W
- Country: United States
- State: Kansas
- County: Graham
- Founded: 1876
- Platted: 1878
- Incorporated: 1888
- Named for: W.R. Hill

Area
  - Total: 1.00 sq mi (2.60 km^{2})
  - Land: 1.00 sq mi (2.60 km^{2})
  - Water: 0 sq mi (0.00 km^{2})
- Elevation: 2,185 ft (666 m)

Population (2020)
  - Total: 1,403
  - Density: 1,400/sq mi (540/km^{2})
- Time zone: UTC-6 (CST)
  - Summer (DST): UTC-5 (CDT)
- ZIP Code: 67642
- Area code: 785
- FIPS code: 20-32175
- GNIS ID: 2394380
- Website: City website

Hill City is a city in and the county seat of Graham County, Kansas, United States. As of the 2020 census, the population of the city was 1,403.

== History ==
The first settlement at Hill City was made in 1876, making it the oldest town in Graham County. The community was named after W. R. Hill, a first settler. Hill City was platted in 1878. The first post office in Hill City was established in September 1878. Hill City was designated county seat in 1880. By 1915, Hill City had 647 inhabitants.

== Geography ==
According to the United States Census Bureau, the city has a total area of 1.00 square mile (2.59 km^{2}), all land.

=== Climate ===
On June 9, 2005, a large tornado passed one mile south of Hill City. Another large tornado hit just north of the city on June 20, 2011.

On June 26, 2012, the temperature reached 115 °F (46 °C), breaking the June record tied just two days earlier and during the Dust Bowl on June 30, 1933; the town was the hottest city in the United States for four days in a row, with temperatures of 114°, 111°, 115°, and 115 °F (46°, 44°, 46°, and 46 °C).

Climate data for Hill City, Kansas, 1991–2020 normals, extremes 1907–present
Month	Jan	Feb	Mar	Apr	May	Jun	Jul	Aug	Sep	Oct	Nov	Dec	Year
Record high °F (°C)	83 (28)	86 (30)	99 (37)	100 (38)	105 (41)	115 (46)	117 (47)	115 (46)	112 (44)	101 (38)	87 (31)	83 (28)	117 (47)
Mean maximum °F (°C)	68.1 (20.1)	73.2 (22.9)	81.3 (27.4)	88.5 (31.4)	95.3 (35.2)	103.8 (39.9)	105.7 (40.9)	102.9 (39.4)	99.7 (37.6)	90.5 (32.5)	78.8 (26.0)	66.4 (19.1)	106.9 (41.6)
Mean daily maximum °F (°C)	41.2 (5.1)	44.9 (7.2)	55.9 (13.3)	64.8 (18.2)	74.2 (23.4)	85.7 (29.8)	91.0 (32.8)	88.6 (31.4)	80.8 (27.1)	67.8 (19.9)	54.2 (12.3)	42.7 (5.9)	66.0 (18.9)
Daily mean °F (°C)	28.7 (−1.8)	31.5 (−0.3)	41.4 (5.2)	50.6 (10.3)	61.1 (16.2)	72.4 (22.4)	78.0 (25.6)	75.5 (24.2)	66.8 (19.3)	53.2 (11.8)	40.2 (4.6)	30.2 (−1.0)	52.5 (11.4)
Mean daily minimum °F (°C)	16.2 (−8.8)	18.0 (−7.8)	26.8 (−2.9)	36.3 (2.4)	48.0 (8.9)	59.1 (15.1)	64.9 (18.3)	62.4 (16.9)	52.7 (11.5)	38.5 (3.6)	26.2 (−3.2)	17.6 (−8.0)	38.9 (3.8)
Mean minimum °F (°C)	−0.8 (−18.2)	1.5 (−16.9)	10.2 (−12.1)	21.6 (−5.8)	33.9 (1.1)	46.9 (8.3)	54.6 (12.6)	52.5 (11.4)	38.9 (3.8)	22.3 (−5.4)	11.1 (−11.6)	0.7 (−17.4)	−6.2 (−21.2)
Record low °F (°C)	−24 (−31)	−23 (−31)	−20 (−29)	4 (−16)	22 (−6)	33 (1)	44 (7)	39 (4)	19 (−7)	3 (−16)	−11 (−24)	−19 (−28)	−24 (−31)
Average precipitation inches (mm)	0.51 (13)	0.71 (18)	1.25 (32)	1.98 (50)	3.73 (95)	2.96 (75)	4.12 (105)	3.33 (85)	2.19 (56)	1.80 (46)	0.83 (21)	0.75 (19)	24.16 (615)
Average snowfall inches (cm)	3.3 (8.4)	5.5 (14)	2.1 (5.3)	0.3 (0.76)	0.2 (0.51)	0.0 (0.0)	0.0 (0.0)	0.0 (0.0)	0.0 (0.0)	0.7 (1.8)	1.5 (3.8)	3.8 (9.7)	17.4 (44.27)
Average precipitation days (≥ 0.01 in)	2.7	3.7	4.9	7.1	9.3	8.5	7.8	7.7	5.5	6.0	4.0	3.2	70.4
Average snowy days (≥ 0.1 in)	1.6	1.9	0.9	0.2	0.0	0.0	0.0	0.0	0.0	0.2	0.8	1.7	7.3
Source: NOAA

== Demographics ==
Historical population
Census	Pop.	Note	%±
1890	545		—
1900	468		−14.1%
1910	983		110.0%
1920	732		−25.5%
1930	1,027		40.3%
1940	1,115		8.6%
1950	1,432		28.4%
1960	2,421		69.1%
1970	2,071		−14.5%
1980	2,028		−2.1%
1990	1,835		−9.5%
2000	1,604		−12.6%
2010	1,474		−8.1%
2020	1,403		−4.8%
U.S. Decennial Census

=== 2020 census ===
The 2020 United States census counted 1,403 people, 625 households, and 359 families in Hill City. The population density was 1,397.4 per square mile (539.5/km^{2}). There were 760 housing units at an average density of 757.0 per square mile (292.3/km^{2}). The racial makeup was 92.3% (1,295) white or European American (90.81% non-Hispanic white), 2.0% (28) black or African-American, 0.43% (6) Native American or Alaska Native, 0.93% (13) Asian, 0.07% (1) Pacific Islander or Native Hawaiian, 0.36% (5) from other races, and 3.92% (55) from two or more races. Hispanic or Latino of any race was 2.92% (41) of the population.

Of the 625 households, 26.1% had children under the age of 18; 45.0% were married couples living together; 27.8% had a female householder with no spouse or partner present. 37.6% of households consisted of individuals and 23.4% had someone living alone who was 65 years of age or older. The average household size was 2.0 and the average family size was 2.8. The percent of those with a bachelor's degree or higher was estimated to be 19.7% of the population.

22.1% of the population was under the age of 18, 5.1% from 18 to 24, 20.8% from 25 to 44, 24.3% from 45 to 64, and 27.7% who were 65 years of age or older. The median age was 47.6 years. For every 100 females, there were 102.7 males. For every 100 females ages 18 and older, there were 107.0 males.

The 2016–2020 5-year American Community Survey estimates show that the median household income was $36,469 (with a margin of error of +/- $3,528) and the median family income was $52,639 (+/- $14,837). Males had a median income of $34,194 (+/- $3,300) versus $28,194 (+/- $3,697) for females. The median income for those above 16 years old was $31,375 (+/- $2,111). Approximately, 15.0% of families and 15.0% of the population were below the poverty line, including 10.9% of those under the age of 18 and 19.9% of those ages 65 or over.

=== 2010 census ===
As of the census of 2010, there were 1,474 people, 669 households, and 404 families residing in the city. The population density was 1,474.0 inhabitants per square mile (569.1/km^{2}). There were 783 housing units at an average density of 783.0 per square mile (302.3/km^{2}). The racial makeup of the city was 91.2% White, 4.5% African American, 0.8% Native American, 0.3% Asian, 0.3% from other races, and 2.8% from two or more races. Hispanic or Latino of any race were 2.5% of the population.

There were 669 households, of which 24.2% had children under the age of 18 living with them, 49.8% were married couples living together, 6.9% had a female householder with no husband present, 3.7% had a male householder with no wife present, and 39.6% were non-families. 35.4% of all households were made up of individuals, and 19.6% had someone living alone who was 65 years of age or older. The average household size was 2.14 and the average family size was 2.76.

The median age in the city was 48 years. 20.8% of residents were under the age of 18; 6.2% were between the ages of 18 and 24; 19% were from 25 to 44; 29.9% were from 45 to 64; and 23.9% were 65 years of age or older. The gender makeup of the city was 46.9% male and 53.1% female.

== Education ==
The community is served by Graham County USD 281 public school district. The district elementary and junior/senior high school are located in Hill City. It was previously known as Hill City USD 281.

== Notable people ==
- Charles V. Park (1885–1982) — noted librarian for whom the Charles V. Park Library at Central Michigan University is named; born in Hill City

== See also ==
- Hillsboro, Kansas, original name was Hill City
