= Prairie Dog State Park =

State park in Kansas, United States

- Location within Kansas Location within the United States
- Interactive map of Prairie Dog State Park
- Location: Norton County, Kansas, United States
- Coordinates: 39°48′25″N 99°57′05″W
- Area: 1,150 acres (470 ha)
- Elevation: 2,287 ft (697 m)
- Established: 1962
- Administrator: Kansas Department of Wildlife and Parks
- Visitors: 191,972 (in 2022)
- Website: Official website
- Kansas State Parks

Prairie Dog State Park is a state park located 4 miles west of Norton, Kansas, United States, on Highway 261. Located in western Kansas, the Prairie Dog State Park is named after the creek that feeds into the Keith Sebelius Reservoir, and had no prairie dog populations living there when it was established in 1967. Prairie dogs were introduced in the 1980s and the state park now holds a thriving colony of about 300.

The park occupies 1,100-acre (450 ha) on the north shore of Keith Sebelius Lake in Norton County. The dam was completed for Keith Sebelius Reservoir in 1965 and quickly filled up the following year. One of the last remaining adobe house is located at the park. The renovated house was built sometime in the 1890s. Also located in the park is the 1886 Hillmon one room school house.

There are several campgrounds, and various recreation opportunities for visitors to enjoy, including a 1.4 mile nature trail, viewable prairie dog town (colony), sand volleyball pit, disc golf course, regulation size basketball court, archery range, horse shoe pits, playground, swimming beach, fishing dock, 1886 one room school house, adobe home, and a 30' x 70' lake view shelter.
