= William B. Ryan =

American lawyer, judge, and politician

William B. Ryan (December 26, 1908 – November 4, 1975) was an American lawyer, judge, and politician.

Ryan was born in Smith County, Kansas and grew up in the Lebanon, Kansas area. He received his law degree from the University of Kansas School of Law in 1933 and practiced law in Smith Center, Kansas. He served as county attorney for Smith County, Kansas from 1934 to 1939. He moved to Norton, Kansas and continued to practice law. Ryan also served as county attorney for Norton County, Kansas. Ryan served on the Norton school board from 1941 to 1953. Ryan served in the Kansas House of Representatives from 1947 to 1949 and was a Republican. Ryan served as mayor of Norton, Kansas from 1953 to 1957 and in the Kansas Senate from 1957 until his resignation in 1963. Keith Sebelius was appointed to the Kansas Senate succeeding Ryan. He then served as Kansas state district court judge from 1963 until his retirement in 1975. Ryan died at the Norton County Hospital in Norton, Kansas from a long illness.
