= Keith Sebelius Lake =

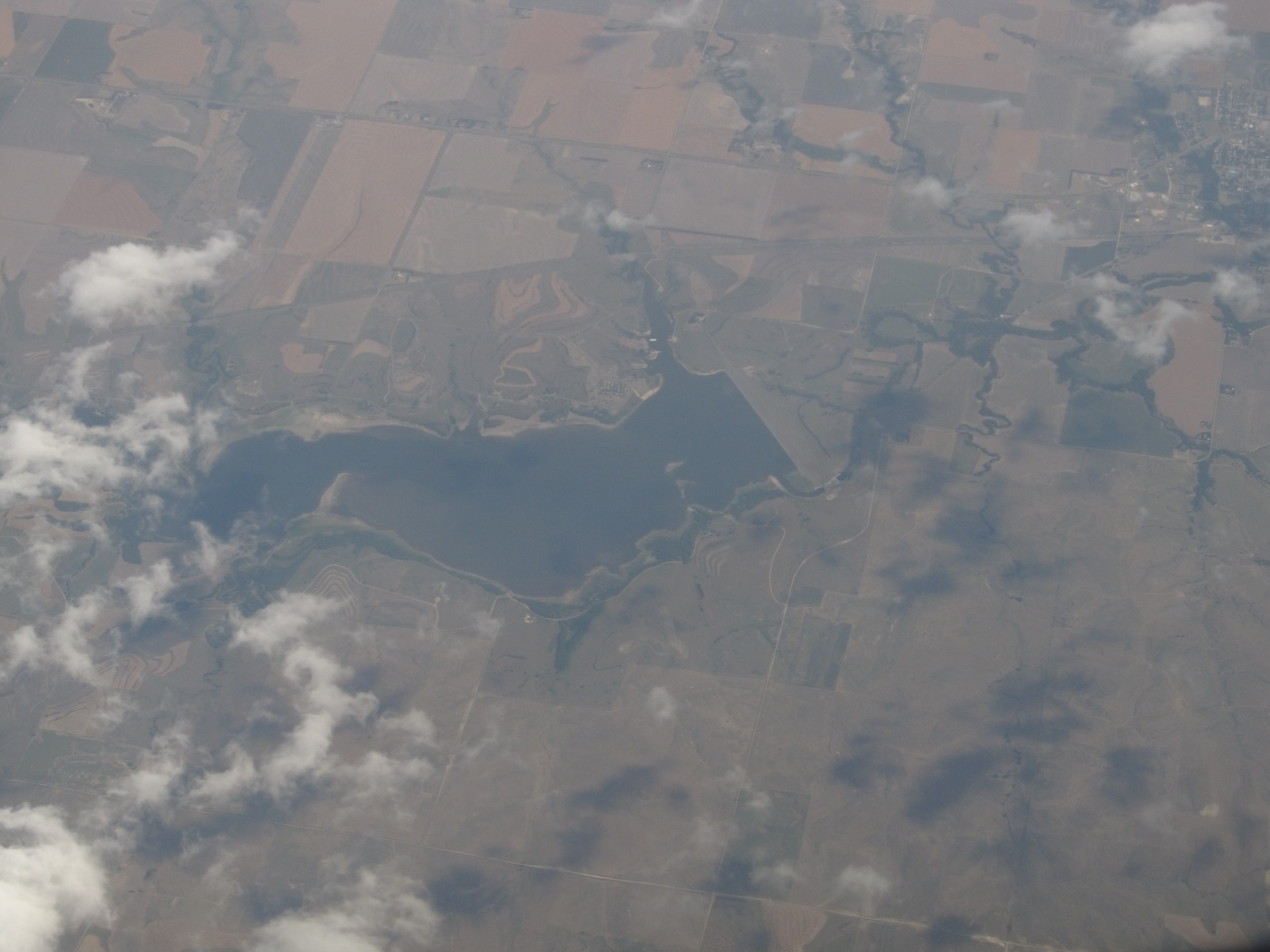
- Aerial view of Keith Sebelius Lake

- Location within Kansas Location within the United States

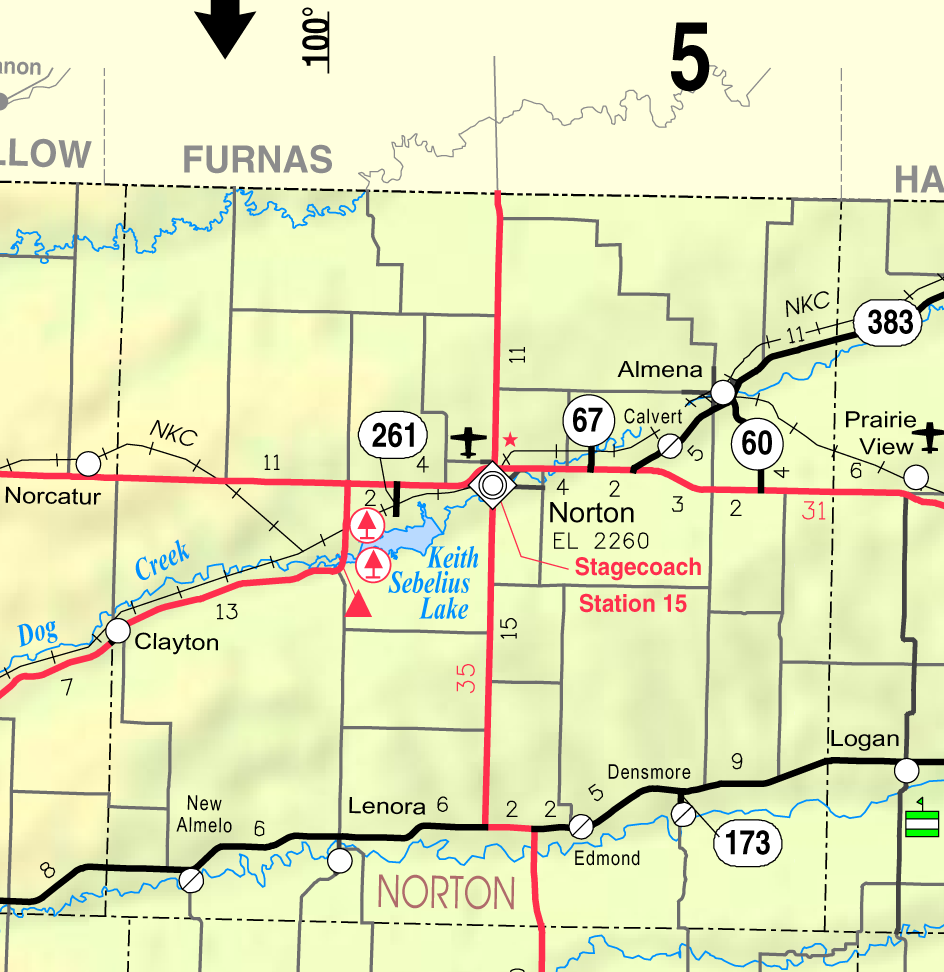
- KDOT map of Norton County (legend)
- Location: Norton County, Kansas
- Coordinates: 39°48′15″N 99°55′55″W
- Type: Reservoir
- Primary inflows: Prairie Dog Creek
- Primary outflows: Prairie Dog Creek
- Catchment area: 715 sq mi (1,850 km^{2})
- Basin countries: United States
- Managing agency: U.S. Bureau of Reclamation
- Built: December 1961
- First flooded: October 1964
- Max. length: 9.5 miles (15.3 km)
- Surface area: 2,181 acres (8.83 km^{2})
- Max. depth: 42 feet (13 m)
- Water volume: Full: 34,510 acre⋅ft (42,570,000 m^{3}); Current (Nov. 2015): 8,996 acre⋅ft (11,096,000 m^{3})
- Shore length^{1}: 32 miles (51 km)
- Surface elevation: Full: 2,304 ft (702 m); Current (Nov. 2015): 2,287 ft (697 m)
- Settlements: Norton
- ^{1} Shore length is not a well-defined measure.

Keith Sebelius Lake, formerly known as Norton Reservoir, is a man-made reservoir on Prairie Dog Creek in northwest Kansas. Built and managed by the U.S. Bureau of Reclamation, it is used for flood control, irrigation, recreation, and local water supply. Prairie Dog State Park is located on its shore.

== History ==
The effects of a 1935 flash flood of the Republican River and its tributaries, including Prairie Dog Creek, led the U.S. Bureau of Reclamation to include the creek in its plans for flood control. The Flood Control Act of 1944 approved and the Flood Control Act of 1946 authorized development of a reservoir on the creek as part of the Pick-Sloan Missouri Basin Program. Construction of Norton Dam began in December 1961, and the initial storage of water in Norton Reservoir started in October 1964.

In March 1958, the nearby community of Norton, Kansas secured a contract with the U.S. government to receive 1,600 acre-feet of water annually. In 1963, the Kansas state government granted the community a water right to that amount of storage in the reservoir. Norton began to use the reservoir as a municipal water supply in September 1965.

In 1981, the U.S. Congress renamed the reservoir Keith Sebelius Lake after retiring U.S. Representative and Norton native Keith Sebelius.

== Geography ==
Keith Sebelius Lake is located at 38°48′15″N 99°55′55″W (39.8041721, -99.9320688) at an elevation of 2,306 feet (703 m). It lies in northwest Kansas in the High Plains region of the Great Plains. The reservoir is located entirely within Norton County.

The reservoir is impounded at its northeastern end by Norton Dam. Prairie Dog Creek is both the reservoir's primary inflow from the southwest and its outflow to the northeast.

U.S. Route 36 and Kansas Highway 383 run concurrently east-west north of the reservoir. Kansas Highway 261 runs north-south between U.S. 36 and Prairie Dog State Park on the reservoir's north shore.

The city of Norton lies 2.5 miles (4.0 km) northeast of the reservoir.

== Hydrography ==
The surface area, surface elevation, and water volume of the reservoir fluctuate based on inflow and local climatic conditions. In terms of capacity, the Bureau of Reclamation vertically divides the reservoir into a set of pools based on volume and water level, and it considers the reservoir full when filled to the capacity of its active conservation pool. When full, Keith Sebelius Lake has a surface area of 2,181 acres (8.83 km^{2}), a surface elevation of 2,304 feet (702 m), and a volume of 34,510 acre-feet (42,570,000 m^{3}). When filled to maximum capacity, it has a surface area of 6,713 acres (27.17 km^{2}), a surface elevation of 2,341 feet (714 m), and a volume of 192,027 acre-feet (236,862,000 m^{3}).

The streambed underlying the reservoir has an elevation of 2,245 feet (684 m). Since the reservoir's initial flooding, sedimentation has gradually accumulated on the reservoir bottom thus raising its elevation.

== Infrastructure ==
Norton Dam is a zoned earth-fill embankment dam with rock riprap on its upstream face. It has a structural height of 151 feet (46 m) and a length of 6,450 feet (1,970 m). At its crest, the dam has an elevation of 2,347 feet (715 m). A spillway structure controlled by three radial gates is located at the southeast end of the dam. Outlet works at the northwest end of the dam manage outflow into Prairie Dog Creek and the city of Norton's municipal water supply.

== Management ==
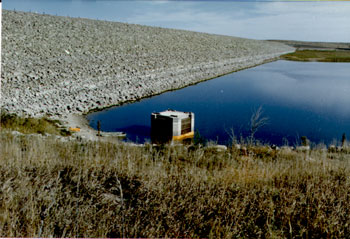
Norton Dam

The U.S. Bureau of Reclamation maintains and operates the reservoir and Norton Dam. The U.S. Army Corps of Engineers provides water regulation procedures for flood control. Downstream canals and structures which use portions of the reservoir's water for irrigation are managed by Almena Irrigation District No. 5. The Kansas Department of Wildlife, Parks and Tourism (KDWP) manages the surface of the reservoir and 6,500 acres (26 km^{2}) of land around it as the Norton Wildlife Area.

== Parks and recreation ==
The KDWP operates the 1,150-acre (4.7 km^{2}) Prairie Dog State Park on the reservoir's north shore. It includes boat ramps, camping facilities, a hiking trail, and a swimming beach.

Keith Sebelius Lake is open for sport fishing year-round. Hunting is permitted on the public land around the reservoir although it is restricted in certain areas.

=== Points of interest ===
The KDWP preserves two vintage 19th-century buildings in Prairie Dog State Park: a one-room schoolhouse and the last standing original adobe house in Kansas. The park also hosts a growing prairie dog town.

== Wildlife ==
Fish species resident in the reservoir include bluegill, channel catfish, crappie, flathead catfish, largemouth bass, saugeye, spotted bass, walleye, and wiper. Game animals living around the reservoir include mule deer, ducks, quail, cottontail rabbits, turkeys, and white-tailed deer.

The reservoir is surrounded almost entirely by shortgrass prairie.

== See also ==
- List of Kansas state parks
- List of lakes, reservoirs, and dams in Kansas
- List of rivers of Kansas
