= New Almelo, Kansas =

Unincorporated community in Norton County, Kansas

- Unincorporated community
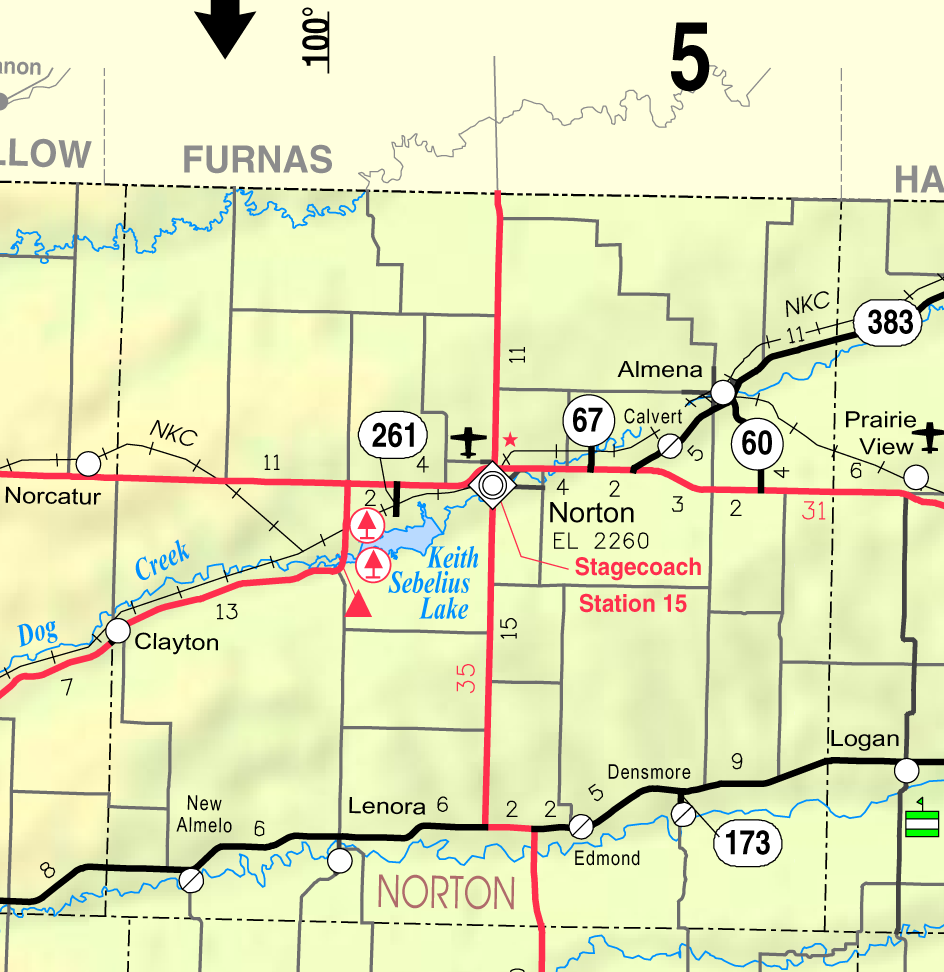
- KDOT map of Norton County (legend)

- Location within Kansas Location within the United States
- Coordinates: 39°35′39″N 100°07′04″W
- Country: United States
- State: Kansas
- County: Norton
- Founded: 1870s
- Named for: Almelo, Netherlands
- Elevation: 2,398 ft (731 m)
- Time zone: UTC-6 (CST)
  - Summer (DST): UTC-5 (CDT)
- Area code: 785
- FIPS code: 20-50175
- GNIS ID: 471120

New Almelo is an unincorporated community in Norton County, Kansas, United States. It is located along K-9 highway.

== History ==
New Elam was issued a post office in 1879. The post office was renamed New Almelo in 1880, then discontinued in 1996.

It is named after the city of Almelo, Netherlands.

The St. Joseph Catholic Church in New Almelo was constructed of the unique pisolitic "algal limestone", a distinctive pink caliche that formed at the top of the Ogallala Formation.

== Education ==
The community is served by Norton USD 211 public school district.
