= Devizes, Kansas =

- Ghost town
- Location within Kansas Location within the United States
- Coordinates: 39°59′28″N 100°03′26″W
- Country: United States
- State: Kansas
- County: Norton
- Elevation: 2,300 ft (700 m)

Population
  - Total: 0
- Time zone: UTC-6 (CST)
  - Summer (DST): UTC-5 (CDT)
- Area code: 785
- FIPS code: 20-17890
- GNIS ID: 484541

Devizes is a ghost town in Norton County, Kansas, United States.

== History ==
Devizes was issued a post office in 1874. The post office was discontinued in 1926.
