= Smithton, Kansas =

- Ghost town
- Location within Kansas Location within the United States
- Coordinates: 39°57′34″N 99°51′05″W
- Country: United States
- State: Kansas
- County: Norton
- Elevation: 2,428 ft (740 m)

Population
  - Total: 0
- Time zone: UTC-6 (CST)
  - Summer (DST): UTC-5 (CDT)
- GNIS ID: 482416

Smithton is a ghost town in Norton County, Kansas, United States.

== History ==
Smithton was issued a post office in 1884. The post office was discontinued in 1886.
