= Fairhaven, Kansas =

- Ghost town
- Location within Kansas Location within the United States
- Coordinates: 39°48′00″N 99°40′56″W
- Country: United States
- State: Kansas
- County: Norton
- Elevation: 2,326 ft (709 m)

Population
  - Total: 0
- Time zone: UTC-6 (CST)
  - Summer (DST): UTC-5 (CDT)
- GNIS ID: 482417

Fairhaven is a ghost town in Norton County, Kansas, United States.

== History ==
Fairhaven was issued a post office in 1879. The post office was discontinued in 1904.
