= Wakeman, Kansas =

- Ghost town
- Location within Kansas Location within the United States
- Coordinates: 39°39′28″N 100°04′41″W
- Country: United States
- State: Kansas
- County: Norton
- Elevation: 2,395 ft (730 m)

Population
  - Total: 0
- Time zone: UTC-6 (CST)
  - Summer (DST): UTC-5 (CDT)
- GNIS ID: 482422

Wakeman is a ghost town in Norton County, Kansas, United States.

== History ==
Wakeman was issued a post office in 1879. The post office was discontinued in 1887.
