= Oronoque, Kansas =

Unincorporated community in Norton County, Kansas

Coordinates: 39°47′20″N 100°01′31″W

Oronoque is an unincorporated community in Norton County, Kansas, United States.

== History ==
Virgil Vogel, in Indian Names in Michigan refers to Oronoque as a variant spelling of Orinoco, the name of a South American river that was adopted with various spellings in other states: Oronoko Charter Township, Michigan and Oronoco, Minnesota.

Oronoque had a post office from 1885 until 1934.

Lucas Maddy, a native of Norton County, and the Kansas Cartel named their 2015 album Oronoque in honor of the former community.

== Education ==
The community is served by Norton USD 211 public school district.
