= Dellvale, Kansas =

Unincorporated community in Norton County, Kansas

Coordinates: 39°46′20″N 100°02′06″W

Dellvale is an unincorporated community in Norton County, Kansas, United States.

== History ==
A post office was opened in Dellvale in 1890, and remained in operation until it was discontinued in 1961.

== Education ==
The community is served by Norton USD 211 public school district.
