= Norton County, Kansas =

County in Kansas, United States

- County
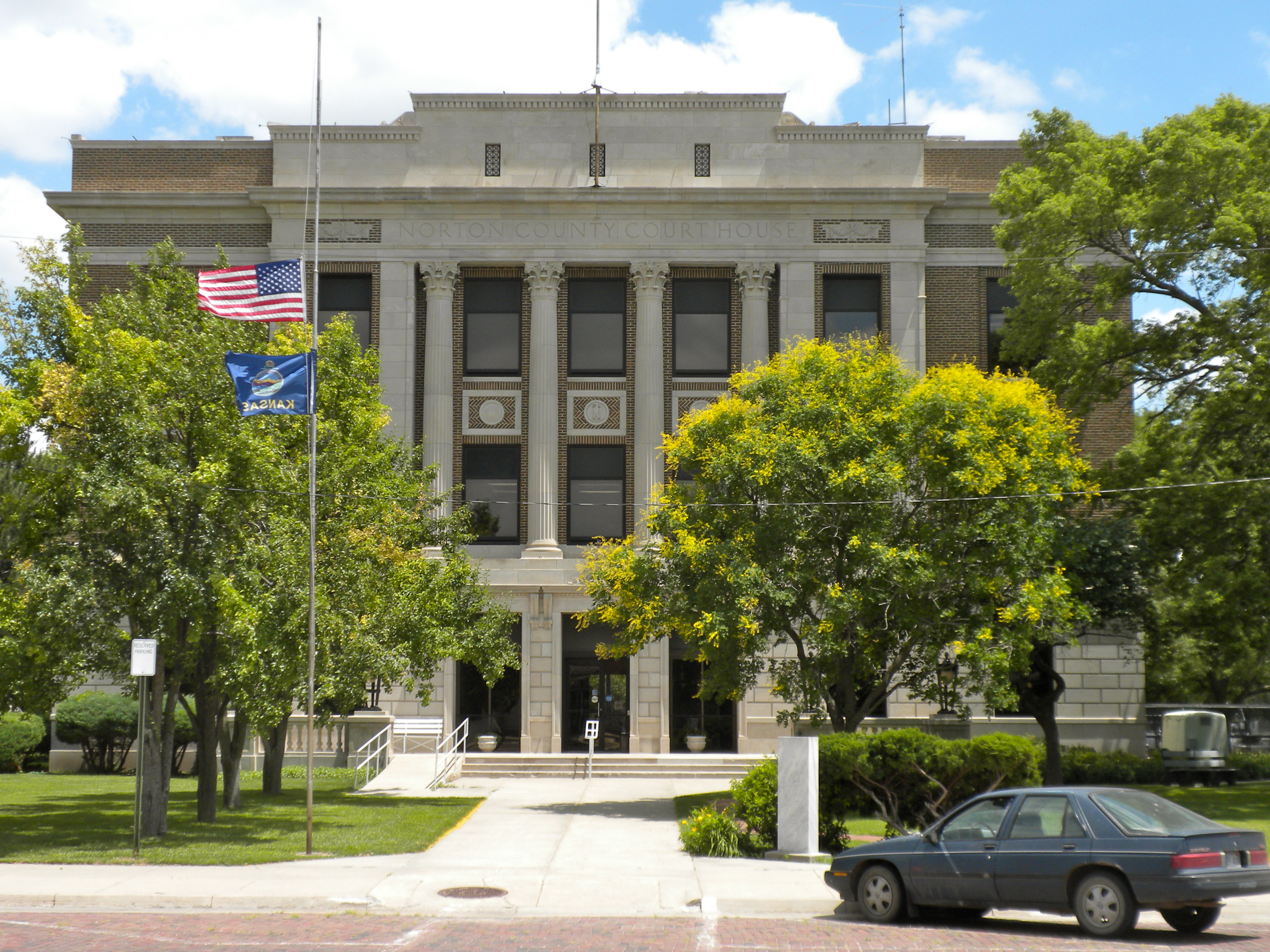
- Norton County Courthouse in Norton (built 1929)

- Location within the U.S. state of Kansas
- Coordinates: 39°48′N 99°55′W
- Country: United States
- State: Kansas
- Founded: February 26, 1867
- Named for: Orloff Norton
- Seat: Norton
- Largest city: Norton

Area
  - Total: 881 sq mi (2,280 km^{2})
  - Land: 878 sq mi (2,270 km^{2})
  - Water: 3.2 sq mi (8.3 km^{2}) 0.4%

Population (2020)
  - Estimate (2025): 5,288 ▼
  - Density: 6.2/sq mi (2.4/km^{2})
- Time zone: UTC−6 (Central)
  - Summer (DST): UTC−5 (CDT)
- Area code: 785
- Congressional district: 1st
- Website: nortoncountyks.gov

Norton County is a county in the U.S. state of Kansas. Its county seat and largest city is Norton. As of the 2020 census, the county population was 5,459. The county was established in 1867 and named for Orloff Norton, captain of Company L, 15th Kansas Militia Infantry Regiment.

== History ==
=== Early history ===
For many millennia, the Great Plains of North America was inhabited by nomadic Native Americans. From the 16th century to 18th century, the Kingdom of France claimed ownership of large parts of North America. In 1762, after the French and Indian War, France secretly ceded New France to Spain, per the Treaty of Fontainebleau.

=== 19th century ===
In 1802, Spain returned most of the land to France, but keeping title to about 7,500 square miles. In 1803, most of the land for modern day Kansas was acquired by the United States from France as part of the 828,000 square mile Louisiana Purchase for 2.83 cents per acre.

In 1854, the Kansas Territory was organized, then in 1861 Kansas became the 34th U.S. state. Norton County was founded by Noah H. Billings, Thomas Beaumont, Henry Gordon, P. Hansen, and George Cole on August 22, 1872. In 1878 Norton became the county seat. The county gets its name for Civil War soldier Orloff Norton of the Fifteenth Kansas Cavalry, who was killed at Cane Hill, Arkansas in 1864.

The initial organization of Norton County in 1872 was fraught with deceit. N.H. Billings, aiming to exploit the county government for personal gain, submitted a forged petition to Governor Harvey, claiming 600 inhabitants when there were only 8 verifiable residents. After the governor initially rejected this, another fraudulent petition was sent, leading to the appointment of a fictitious census taker, Richard M. Johnson, which resulted in a fabricated census. This census allowed for the proclamation of Billingsville as the temporary county seat and the appointment of county officers. An election followed where Norton was declared the county seat, and various county officials were elected, including Billings, who engaged in further manipulation regarding school bonds and legislative actions.

The first settlers arrived in 1871, with George Cole securing the first homestead. The influx of settlers increased in 1872, though the area was not entirely safe from Native American activity, leading to several "Indian scares." Community services began to establish with the first school in 1873, taught by J. H. Simmons, and the first physician, Mrs. P. A. O. Briggs, who was known for her dedication to patients regardless of their ability to pay. Despite the early fraudulent population claims, by 1880, the real population had grown but was still significantly less than the initial bogus census count.

The first county fair, although not official, was held in Leota in October 1878. After 1900 the fair was held yearly in Elmwood Park in Norton. The first school district was formed in Norton in 1872. School was held in a dugout beginning December 1, 1873.

=== 21st century ===
In 2020, Norton County became a major hotspot in the COVID-19 pandemic. In July, an inmate at the Norton Correctional Facility, a state prison, tested positive for coronavirus. By mid-October, more than 130 cases had been reported at the prison. On October 19, officials announced that all 62 residents of the Andbe Home nursing home in Norton had tested positive for COVID-19, 10 of whom had died. As of October 20, Norton County had the highest rate of infection over the previous 7 and 14 days of any county in the United States.

== Geography ==
According to the U.S. Census Bureau, the county has a total area of 881 square miles (2,280 km^{2}), of which 878 square miles (2,270 km^{2}) is land and 3.2 square miles (8.3 km^{2}) (0.4%) is water.

=== Adjacent counties ===
- Furnas County, Nebraska (north)
- Harlan County, Nebraska (northeast)
- Phillips County (east)
- Graham County (south)
- Sheridan County (southwest)
- Decatur County (west)

== Demographics ==
Historical population
Census	Pop.	Note	%±
1880	6,998		—
1890	10,617		51.7%
1900	11,325		6.7%
1910	11,614		2.6%
1920	11,423		−1.6%
1930	11,701		2.4%
1940	9,831		−16.0%
1950	8,808		−10.4%
1960	8,035		−8.8%
1970	7,279		−9.4%
1980	6,689		−8.1%
1990	5,947		−11.1%
2000	5,953		0.1%
2010	5,671		−4.7%
2020	5,459		−3.7%
2025 (est.)	5,288	▼	−3.1%
U.S. Decennial Census; 1790–1960 1900–1990; 1990–2000 2010–2020

=== Racial and ethnic composition ===
Norton County, Kansas – Racial and ethnic composition Note: the US Census treats Hispanic/Latino as an ethnic category. This table excludes Latinos from the racial categories and assigns them to a separate category. Hispanics/Latinos may be of any race.
Race / Ethnicity (NH = Non-Hispanic)	Pop 1980	Pop 1990	Pop 2000	Pop 2010	Pop 2020	% 1980	% 1990	% 2000	% 2010	% 2020
White alone (NH)	6,615	5,693	5,485	5,166	4,690	98.89%	95.73%	92.14%	91.10%	85.91%
Black or African American alone (NH)	15	134	240	162	199	0.22%	2.25%	4.03%	2.86%	3.65%
Native American or Alaska Native alone (NH)	2	14	26	12	33	0.03%	0.24%	0.44%	0.21%	0.60%
Asian alone (NH)	14	20	25	30	35	0.21%	0.34%	0.42%	0.53%	0.64%
Native Hawaiian or Pacific Islander alone (NH)	x	x	0	1	2	x	x	0.00%	0.02%	0.04%
Other race alone (NH)	3	4	0	0	9	0.04%	0.07%	0.00%	0.00%	0.16%
Mixed race or Multiracial (NH)	x	x	36	60	180	x	x	0.60%	1.06%	3.30%
Hispanic or Latino (any race)	40	82	141	240	311	0.60%	1.38%	2.37%	4.23%	5.70%
Total	6,689	5,947	5,953	5,671	5,459	100.00%	100.00%	100.00%	100.00%	100.00%

=== 2020 census ===
As of the 2020 census, the county had a population of 5,459. The median age was 42.3 years. 19.4% of residents were under the age of 18 and 19.4% of residents were 65 years of age or older. For every 100 females there were 136.4 males, and for every 100 females age 18 and over there were 148.9 males age 18 and over.

The racial makeup of the county was 89.1% White, 3.8% Black or African American, 0.8% American Indian and Alaska Native, 0.6% Asian, 0.0% Native Hawaiian and Pacific Islander, 0.9% from some other race, and 4.7% from two or more races. Hispanic or Latino residents of any race comprised 5.7% of the population.

0.0% of residents lived in urban areas, while 100.0% lived in rural areas.

There were 1,991 households in the county, of which 25.8% had children under the age of 18 living with them and 23.6% had a female householder with no spouse or partner present. About 33.6% of all households were made up of individuals and 14.6% had someone living alone who was 65 years of age or older.

There were 2,461 housing units, of which 19.1% were vacant. Among occupied housing units, 72.1% were owner-occupied and 27.9% were renter-occupied. The homeowner vacancy rate was 2.8% and the rental vacancy rate was 14.1%.

=== 2000 census ===
As of the 2000 US census, there were 5,953 people, 2,266 households, and 1,470 families residing in the county. The population density was 7 people per square mile (2.7 people/km^{2}). There were 2,673 housing units at an average density of 3 per square mile (1.2/km^{2}). The racial makeup of the county was 93.35% White, 4.05% Black or African American, 0.44% Native American, 0.42% Asian, 0.02% Pacific Islander, 1.02% from other races, and 0.71% from two or more races. 2.37% of the population were Hispanic or Latino of any race.

There were 2,266 households, out of which 28.20% had children under the age of 18 living with them, 55.50% were married couples living together, 7.00% had a female householder with no husband present, and 35.10% were non-families. 32.30% of all households were made up of individuals, and 17.90% had someone living alone who was 65 years of age or older. The average household size was 2.28 and the average family size was 2.89.

In the county, the population was spread out, with 22.00% under the age of 18, 7.70% from 18 to 24, 28.30% from 25 to 44, 22.30% from 45 to 64, and 19.60% who were 65 years of age or older. The median age was 40 years. For every 100 females there were 122.10 males. For every 100 females age 18 and over, there were 122.90 males.

The median income for a household in the county was $31,050, and the median income for a family was $37,036. Males had a median income of $25,983 versus $20,381 for females. The per capita income for the county was $16,835. About 6.10% of families and 10.50% of the population were below the poverty line, including 12.70% of those under age 18 and 8.20% of those age 65 or over.

== Government ==
=== County ===
Noah H. Billings was an early county settler, county superintendent of schools, county attorney, and state representative. Keith Sebelius served as a U.S. congressman from 1969 to 1981.

=== Presidential elections ===
Presidential election results

United States presidential election results for Norton County, Kansas
Year	Republican		Democratic		Third party(ies)	
Year	No.	%	No.	%	No.	%
1888	1,471	56.60%	631	24.28%	497	19.12%
1892	1,054	48.26%	0	0.00%	1,130	51.74%
1896	941	42.07%	1,260	56.33%	36	1.61%
1900	1,329	51.67%	1,212	47.12%	31	1.21%
1904	1,570	67.18%	417	17.84%	350	14.98%
1908	1,448	49.76%	1,337	45.95%	125	4.30%
1912	598	23.98%	1,081	43.34%	815	32.68%
1916	1,616	34.28%	2,876	61.01%	222	4.71%
1920	2,288	65.24%	1,082	30.85%	137	3.91%
1924	2,778	59.33%	1,261	26.93%	643	13.73%
1928	3,365	73.99%	1,087	23.90%	96	2.11%
1932	2,272	44.16%	2,705	52.58%	168	3.27%
1936	2,829	54.83%	2,307	44.71%	24	0.47%
1940	3,415	70.28%	1,378	28.36%	66	1.36%
1944	2,890	70.87%	1,159	28.42%	29	0.71%
1948	2,461	60.98%	1,414	35.03%	161	3.99%
1952	3,530	76.23%	1,047	22.61%	54	1.17%
1956	3,052	71.58%	1,194	28.00%	18	0.42%
1960	2,781	68.01%	1,300	31.79%	8	0.20%
1964	2,245	60.09%	1,449	38.78%	42	1.12%
1968	2,543	70.91%	841	23.45%	202	5.63%
1972	2,688	75.80%	776	21.88%	82	2.31%
1976	2,201	60.55%	1,337	36.78%	97	2.67%
1980	2,625	75.50%	666	19.15%	186	5.35%
1984	2,515	79.19%	611	19.24%	50	1.57%
1988	1,923	67.54%	855	30.03%	69	2.42%
1992	1,469	47.88%	779	25.39%	820	26.73%
1996	1,814	66.42%	640	23.43%	277	10.14%
2000	1,744	71.15%	598	24.40%	109	4.45%
2004	2,092	80.49%	473	18.20%	34	1.31%
2008	1,878	77.76%	497	20.58%	40	1.66%
2012	1,878	80.77%	398	17.12%	49	2.11%
2016	1,840	82.36%	281	12.58%	113	5.06%
2020	2,007	83.11%	364	15.07%	44	1.82%
2024	1,882	82.91%	346	15.24%	42	1.85%

Like all the High Plains, Norton County is overwhelmingly Republican. In 1964, the last time the Republicans did not carry Kansas’ electoral votes, Norton County was Barry Goldwater’s second-best county in the state behind Clay County. The last Democrat to reach forty percent of the county’s vote was Franklin D. Roosevelt in 1936, ironically against Kansas Governor Alf Landon. Roosevelt in 1932 was the last Democrat to carry Norton County, and the only others are Woodrow Wilson (twice) and William Jennings Bryan in his first 1896 campaign.

=== Laws ===
Following amendment to the Kansas Constitution in 1986, the county remained a prohibition, or "dry", county until 1992, when voters approved the sale of alcoholic liquor by the individual drink with a 30 percent food sales requirement.

== Education ==
=== Unified school districts ===
School districts include:

- Logan USD 326
- Norton USD 211
- Northern Valley USD 212
- Oberlin USD 294

== Communities ==
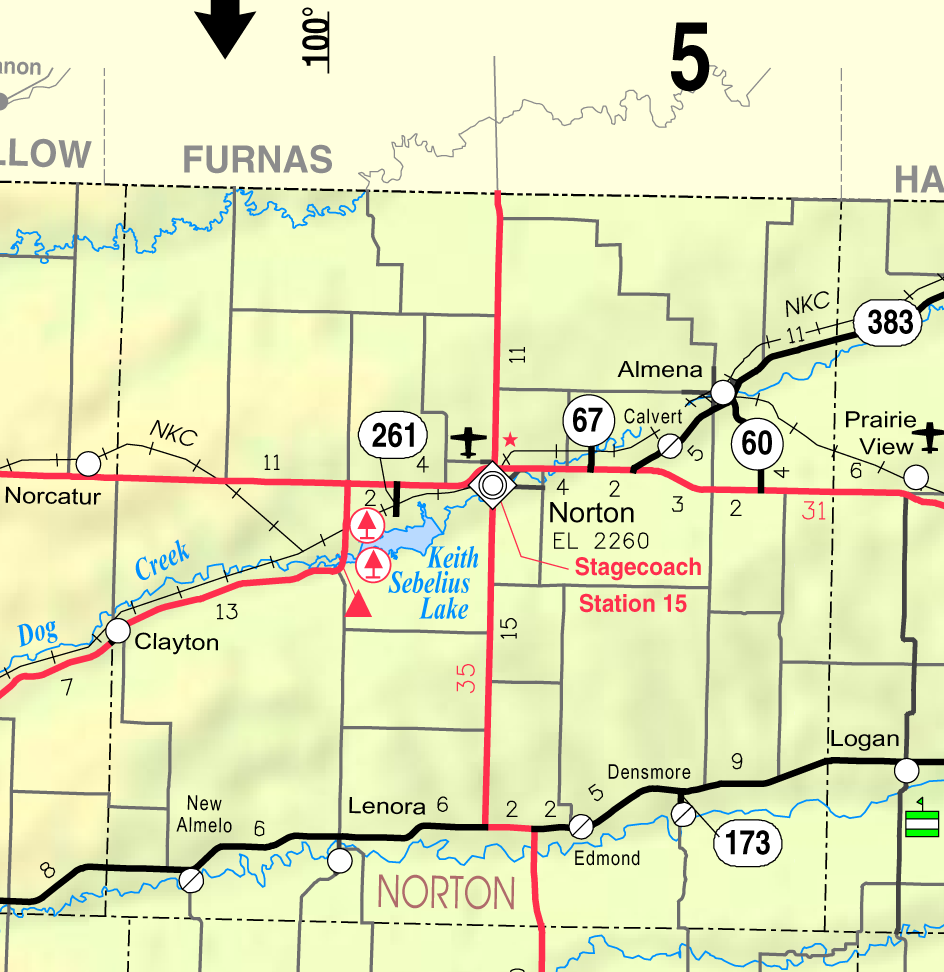
2005 map of Norton County (map legend)

List of townships / incorporated cities / unincorporated communities / extinct former communities within Norton County.

=== Cities ===
‡ means a community has portions in an adjacent county.

- Almena
- Clayton‡
- Edmond
- Lenora
- Norton (county seat)

=== Unincorporated communities ===
- Calvert
- Dellvale
- Densmore
- New Almelo
- Oronoque
- Reager

=== Ghost towns ===
- Bower
- Brett
- Cactus
- Devizes
- Fairhaven
- Hanback
- Hedgewood
- Rayville
- Rockwell
- Smithton
- Wakeman

=== Townships ===
Norton County is divided into four townships. The city of Norton is considered governmentally independent and is excluded from the census figures for the townships. In the following table, the population center is the largest city (or cities) included in that township's population total, if it is of a significant size. The 2010 census shows the area of the former Harrison-District 6 as combined into that of Almena-District 4.

Sources: Kansas Historical Society, 2000 U.S. Gazetteer from the U.S. Census Bureau.
Township	FIPS	Population center	Population	Population density /km^{2} (/sq mi)	Land area km^{2} (sq mi)	Water area km^{2} (sq mi)	Water %	Geographic coordinates
Almena-District 4	01450		508	2 (6)	278 (107)	0 (0)	0%	39°53′10″N 99°41′2″W
Center-District 1	12260		1,521	2 (5)	654 (253)	0 (0)	0.08%	39°53′43″N 99°57′2″W
Harrison-District 6 (defunct)	30460		12 (2000 census)	0 (0)	93 (36)	0 (0)	0.02%	39°56′54″N 99°48′25″W
Highland-District 2	32060		546	1 (3)	748 (289)	9 (3)	1.13%	39°41′24″N 100°1′49″W
Solomon-District 3	66410		137	0 (1)	496 (192)	0 (0)	0.02%	39°40′38″N 99°45′56″W

== See also ==
- National Register of Historic Places listings in Norton County, Kansas

Community information for Kansas

- Kansas locations by per capita income
- List of counties in Kansas
- List of townships in Kansas
- List of cities in Kansas
- List of unincorporated communities in Kansas
- List of ghost towns in Kansas
