= Brett, Kansas =

- Ghost town
- Location within Kansas Location within the United States
- Coordinates: 39°54′33″N 100°01′08″W
- Country: United States
- State: Kansas
- County: Norton
- Elevation: 2,451 ft (747 m)

Population
  - Total: 0
- Time zone: UTC-6 (CST)
  - Summer (DST): UTC-5 (CDT)
- GNIS ID: 482415

Brett is a ghost town in Norton County, Kansas, United States.

== History ==
Brett was issued a post office in 1880. The post office was discontinued in 1887.
