= Clayton, Kansas =

City in Decatur and Norton Counties of Kansas

- City
- Location within Norton County and Kansas

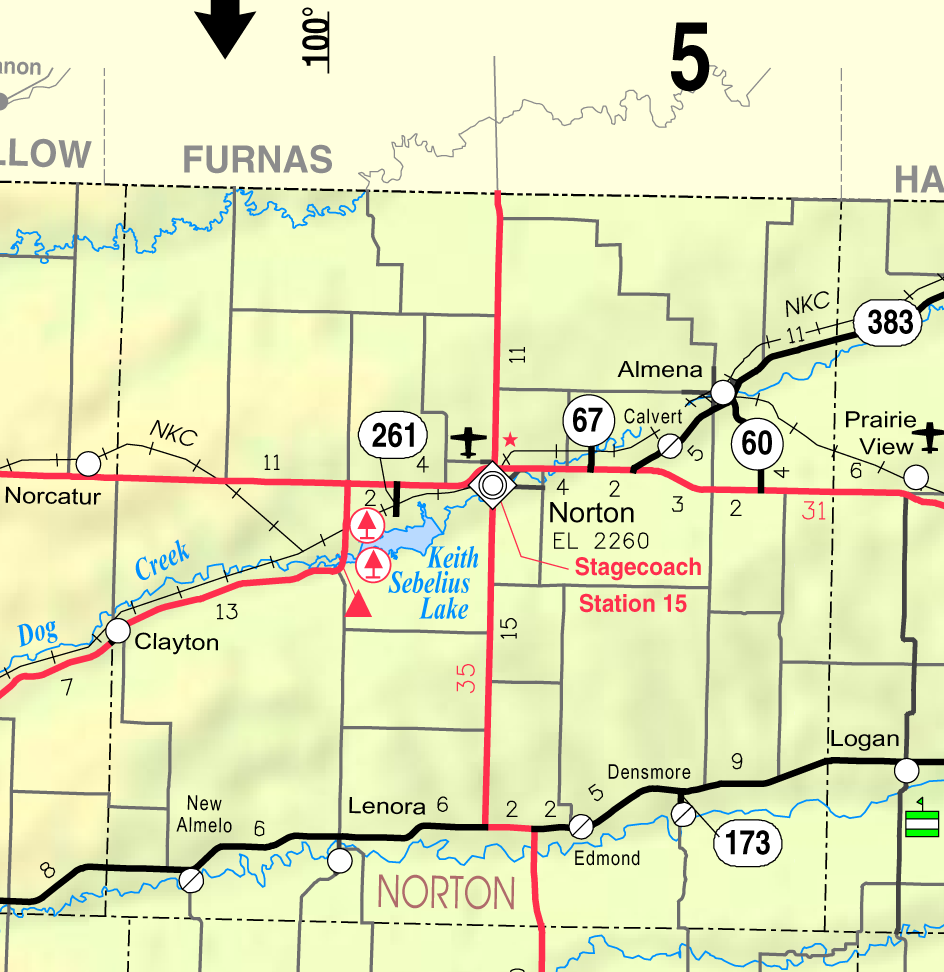
- KDOT map of Norton County (legend)
- Coordinates: 39°44′13″N 100°10′35″W
- Country: United States
- State: Kansas
- Counties: Decatur, Norton
- Founded: 1870s
- Incorporated: 1907
- Named for: Clay

Area
  - Total: 0.42 sq mi (1.09 km^{2})
  - Land: 0.42 sq mi (1.09 km^{2})
  - Water: 0 sq mi (0.00 km^{2})
- Elevation: 2,428 ft (740 m)

Population (2020)
  - Total: 44
  - Density: 100/sq mi (40/km^{2})
- Time zone: UTC-6 (CST)
  - Summer (DST): UTC-5 (CDT)
- ZIP Code: 67629
- Area code: 785
- FIPS code: 20-13675
- GNIS ID: 2393549

Clayton is a city in Decatur and Norton counties in the U.S. state of Kansas. As of the 2020 census, the population of the city was 44.

== History ==
The first post office in Clayton was established in March 1879. Clayton was named for the valuable clay found in the vicinity.

Clayton was incorporated as a city in 1907.

== Geography ==
According to the United States Census Bureau, the city has a total area of 0.43 square miles (1.11 km^{2}), all land.

== Demographics ==
Historical population
Census	Pop.	Note	%±
1910	191		—
1920	258		35.1%
1930	226		−12.4%
1940	153		−32.3%
1950	157		2.6%
1960	161		2.5%
1970	127		−21.1%
1980	102		−19.7%
1990	91		−10.8%
2000	66		−27.5%
2010	59		−10.6%
2020	44		−25.4%
U.S. Decennial Census

=== 2020 census ===
The 2020 United States census counted 44 people, 22 households, and 14 families in Clayton. The population density was 104.5 per square mile (40.4/km^{2}). There were 32 housing units at an average density of 76.0 per square mile (29.3/km^{2}). The racial makeup was 90.91% (40) white or European American (90.91% non-Hispanic white), 2.27% (1) black or African-American, 0.0% (0) Native American or Alaska Native, 2.27% (1) Asian, 0.0% (0) Pacific Islander or Native Hawaiian, 0.0% (0) from other races, and 4.55% (2) from two or more races. Hispanic or Latino of any race was 0.0% (0) of the population.

Of the 22 households, 18.2% had children under the age of 18; 40.9% were married couples living together; 22.7% had a female householder with no spouse or partner present. 27.3% of households consisted of individuals and 13.6% had someone living alone who was 65 years of age or older. The average household size was 1.8 and the average family size was 2.2.

18.2% of the population was under the age of 18, 4.5% from 18 to 24, 9.1% from 25 to 44, 36.4% from 45 to 64, and 31.8% who were 65 years of age or older. The median age was 57.5 years. For every 100 females, there were 100.0 males. For every 100 females ages 18 and older, there were 111.8 males.

The 2016–2020 5-year American Community Survey estimates show that the median household income was $42,375 (with a margin of error of +/- $32,443) and the median family income was $63,750 (+/- $8,107). Females had a median income of $35,625 (+/- $21,674). The median income for those above 16 years old was $35,000 (+/- $22,673).

=== 2010 census ===
As of the census of 2010, there were 59 people, 23 households, and 19 families living in the city. The population density was 137.2 inhabitants per square mile (53.0/km^{2}). There were 34 housing units at an average density of 79.1 per square mile (30.5/km^{2}). The racial makeup of the city was 96.6% White and 3.4% Native American. Hispanic or Latino of any race were 1.7% of the population.

There were 23 households, of which 21.7% had children under the age of 18 living with them, 56.5% were married couples living together, 13.0% had a female householder with no husband present, 13.0% had a male householder with no wife present, and 17.4% were non-families. 17.4% of all households were made up of individuals. The average household size was 2.57 and the average family size was 2.74.

The median age in the city was 50.9 years. 16.9% of residents were under the age of 18; 5.2% were between the ages of 18 and 24; 18.7% were from 25 to 44; 42.5% were from 45 to 64; and 16.9% were 65 years of age or older. The gender makeup of the city was 52.5% male and 47.5% female.

== Education ==
Clayton and rural areas east of the community are served by Norton USD 211 public school district. Northwest rural areas (north of highway 383) are served by Oberlin USD 294. Southwest rural areas (south of highway 383) are served by Hoxie USD 412.

In 2010, Norton USD 211 absorbed the former West Solomon USD 213, which had dissolved.

Clayton schools were closed through school unification. The Clayton High School mascot was Bulldogs.
