= Rockwell, Kansas =

- Ghost town
- Location within Kansas Location within the United States
- Coordinates: 39°50′00″N 100°05′01″W
- Country: United States
- State: Kansas
- County: Norton
- Elevation: 2,451 ft (747 m)

Population
  - Total: 0
- Time zone: UTC-6 (CST)
  - Summer (DST): UTC-5 (CDT)
- FIPS code: 20-60740
- GNIS ID: 484916

Rockwell is a ghost town in Norton County, Kansas, United States.

== History ==
The community was initially named Bell, then later as Rockwell City.

Bell was issued a post office in 1879. The post office was renamed Rockwell City in 1884, then discontinued in 1904.
