= Edmond, Kansas =

City in Norton County, Kansas

- City
- Location within Norton County and Kansas

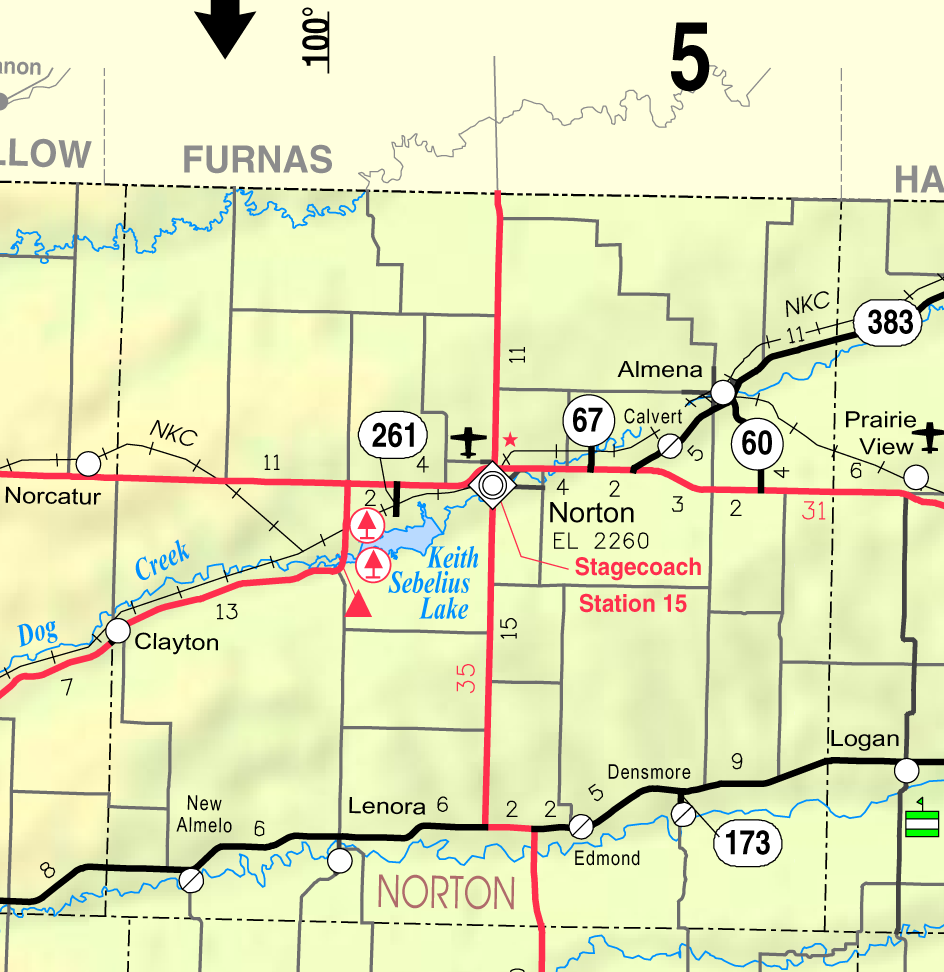
- KDOT map of Norton County (legend)
- Coordinates: 39°37′37″N 99°49′12″W
- Country: United States
- State: Kansas
- County: Norton
- Founded: 1870s
- Incorporated: 1916
- Named for: Jack Edmond

Area
  - Total: 0.17 sq mi (0.43 km^{2})
  - Land: 0.17 sq mi (0.43 km^{2})
  - Water: 0 sq mi (0.00 km^{2})
- Elevation: 2,133 ft (650 m)

Population (2020)
  - Total: 28
  - Density: 170/sq mi (65/km^{2})
- Time zone: UTC-6 (CST)
  - Summer (DST): UTC-5 (CDT)
- ZIP Code: 67645
- Area code: 785
- FIPS code: 20-19875
- GNIS ID: 2394623
- Website: www.edmondks.gov

Edmond is a city in Norton County, Kansas, United States. As of the 2020 census, the population of the city was 28.

== History ==
Edmond had a post office from the 1870s until 1996. Edmond was named for Jack Edmond, who offered a supply of flour in exchange for the naming rights.

== Geography ==
According to the United States Census Bureau, the city has a total area of 0.17 square miles (0.44 km^{2}), all land.

== Demographics ==
Historical population
Census	Pop.	Note	%±
1920	213		—
1930	197		−7.5%
1940	180		−8.6%
1950	110		−38.9%
1960	91		−17.3%
1970	90		−1.1%
1980	56		−37.8%
1990	37		−33.9%
2000	47		27.0%
2010	49		4.3%
2020	28		−42.9%
U.S. Decennial Census

=== 2020 census ===
The 2020 United States census counted 28 people, 12 households, and 8 families in Edmond. The population density was 168.7 per square mile (65.1/km^{2}). There were 24 housing units at an average density of 144.6 per square mile (55.8/km^{2}). The racial makeup was 89.29% (25) white or European American (89.29% non-Hispanic white), 0.0% (0) black or African-American, 7.14% (2) Native American or Alaska Native, 0.0% (0) Asian, 0.0% (0) Pacific Islander or Native Hawaiian, 0.0% (0) from other races, and 3.57% (1) from two or more races. Hispanic or Latino of any race was 3.57% (1) of the population.

Of the 12 households, 25.0% had children under the age of 18; 50.0% were married couples living together; 25.0% had a female householder with no spouse or partner present. 33.3% of households consisted of individuals and 25.0% had someone living alone who was 65 years of age or older. The average household size was 3.2 and the average family size was 8.7.

7.1% of the population was under the age of 18, 14.3% from 18 to 24, 17.9% from 25 to 44, 46.4% from 45 to 64, and 14.3% who were 65 years of age or older. The median age was 49.0 years. For every 100 females, there were 115.4 males. For every 100 females ages 18 and older, there were 100.0 males.

=== 2010 census ===
As of the census of 2010, there were 49 people, 23 households, and 15 families residing in the city. The population density was 288.2 inhabitants per square mile (111.3/km^{2}). There were 31 housing units at an average density of 182.4 per square mile (70.4/km^{2}). The racial makeup of the city was 98.0% White and 2.0% Native American.

There were 23 households, of which 26.1% had children under the age of 18 living with them, 60.9% were married couples living together, 4.3% had a female householder with no husband present, and 34.8% were non-families. 34.8% of all households were made up of individuals, and 4.3% had someone living alone who was 65 years of age or older. The average household size was 2.13 and the average family size was 2.73.

The median age in the city was 43.5 years. 20.4% of residents were under the age of 18; 4.1% were between the ages of 18 and 24; 26.5% were from 25 to 44; 36.8% were from 45 to 64; and 12.2% were 65 years of age or older. The gender makeup of the city was 53.1% male and 46.9% female.

== Education ==
The community is served by Norton USD 211 public school district.
