= Norton Downtown Historic District =

Historic district in Kansas, United States

- U.S. National Register of Historic Places
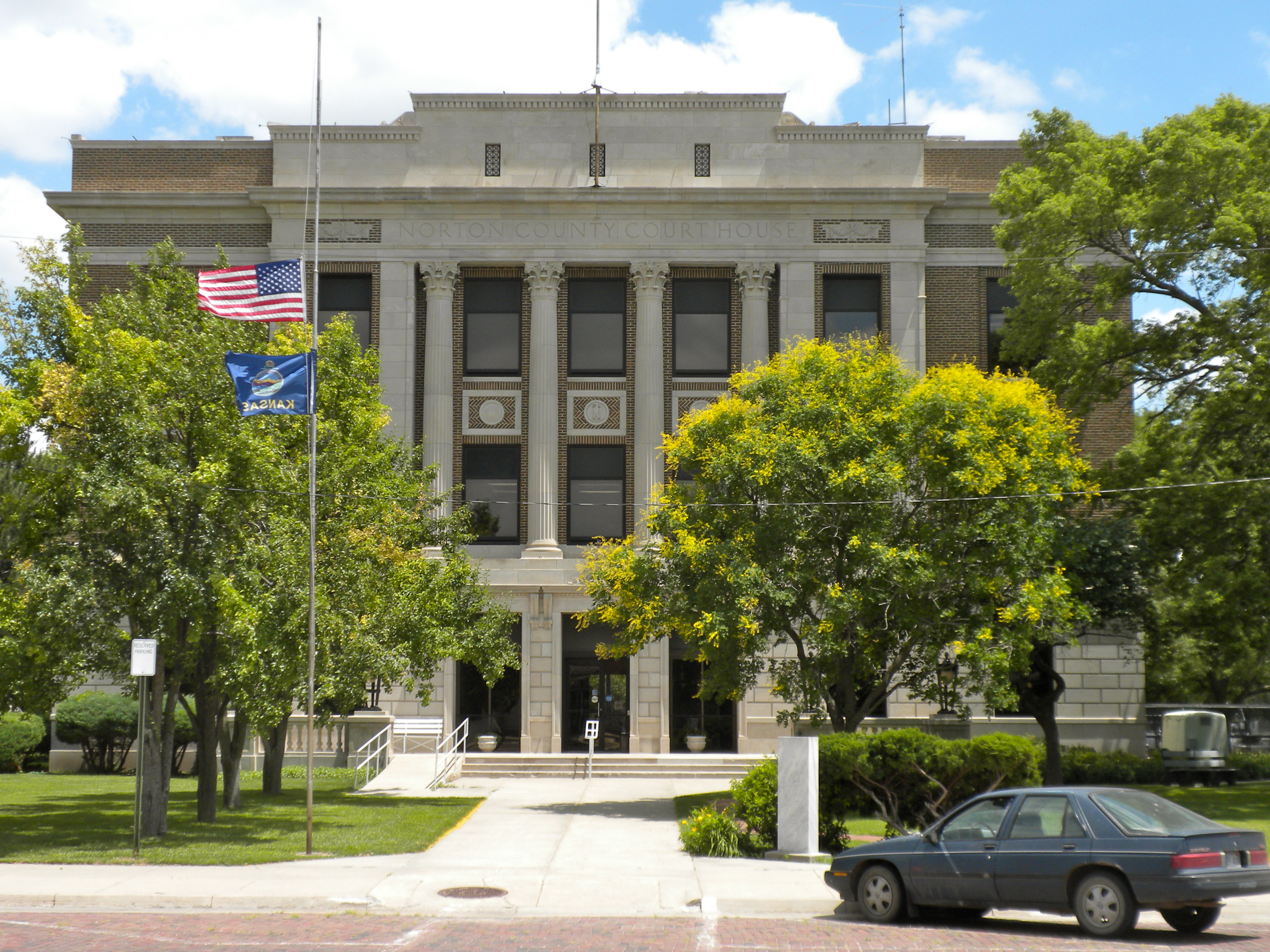
- Norton County Courthouse

- Location within Kansas
- Location: Generally bounded by E Lincoln St, S 1st St, E Penn St, and S Norton Ave, Norton, Kansas
- Coordinates: 39.82889°N 99.88889°W
- Area: 19 acres (7.7 ha)
- Architect: Cuthburt & Suehrk, others
- Architectural style: Late 19th and 20th Century Revivals, Modern Movement
- NRHP reference No.: 10001144
- Added to NRHP: January 18, 2011

The Norton Downtown Historic District, in Norton, Kansas, was listed on the National Register of Historic Places in 2011. It is a 19 acres (7.7 ha) area which included 43 contributing buildings, a network of brick-paved streets which is counted as contributing structure, and 18 non-contributing properties.

It is a commercial, industrial, and civic area between the original Burlington & Missouri River railroad alignment on the north of downtown and the original Chicago, Rock Island & Pacific railroad alignment on the south of downtown. In terms of streets it is roughly bounded by East Lincoln Street on the north, on the south by East Penn Street on the south, South First Street on the west, and South Norton Avenue on the east.

The process of preserving the downtown area began in 2008. A specialist from the Kansas State Historical Society introduced local officials to the funding opportunities for historical restoration of downtown buildings. This was followed in 2009 by a grant that covered about 60% of the funding for building restoration. The downtown area was listed as a Kansas State Historic Site on November 20, 2010.

Individual buildings are mostly one- or two-story buildings, which are architecturally one-part or two-part commercial blocks.

It includes:

- Norton County Courthouse (1929), a monumental building with six Corinthian fluted engaged columns on its east and west sides, and six Corinthian fluted pilasters on its north and south sides. Other features include full entablatures above each set of columns or pilasters, and, on all four sides, dentillation on the cornice of its raised parapet wall. It was designed by architects Cuthbert & Suehrk.
- Southwestern Bell Telephone Building (1956–1958), 206 E. Lincoln St., a two-story two-part commercial block which is "an excellent example of Modern Movement architecture in downtown Norton."
- and more.

Since the designation of the area as a historic district, the local Chamber of Commerce estimates over $6,595,000 has been invested in restoration and rehabilitation of buildings and has led to more businesses relocating to the district.
