= Norton, Kansas =

City in Norton County, Kansas

- City and County seat
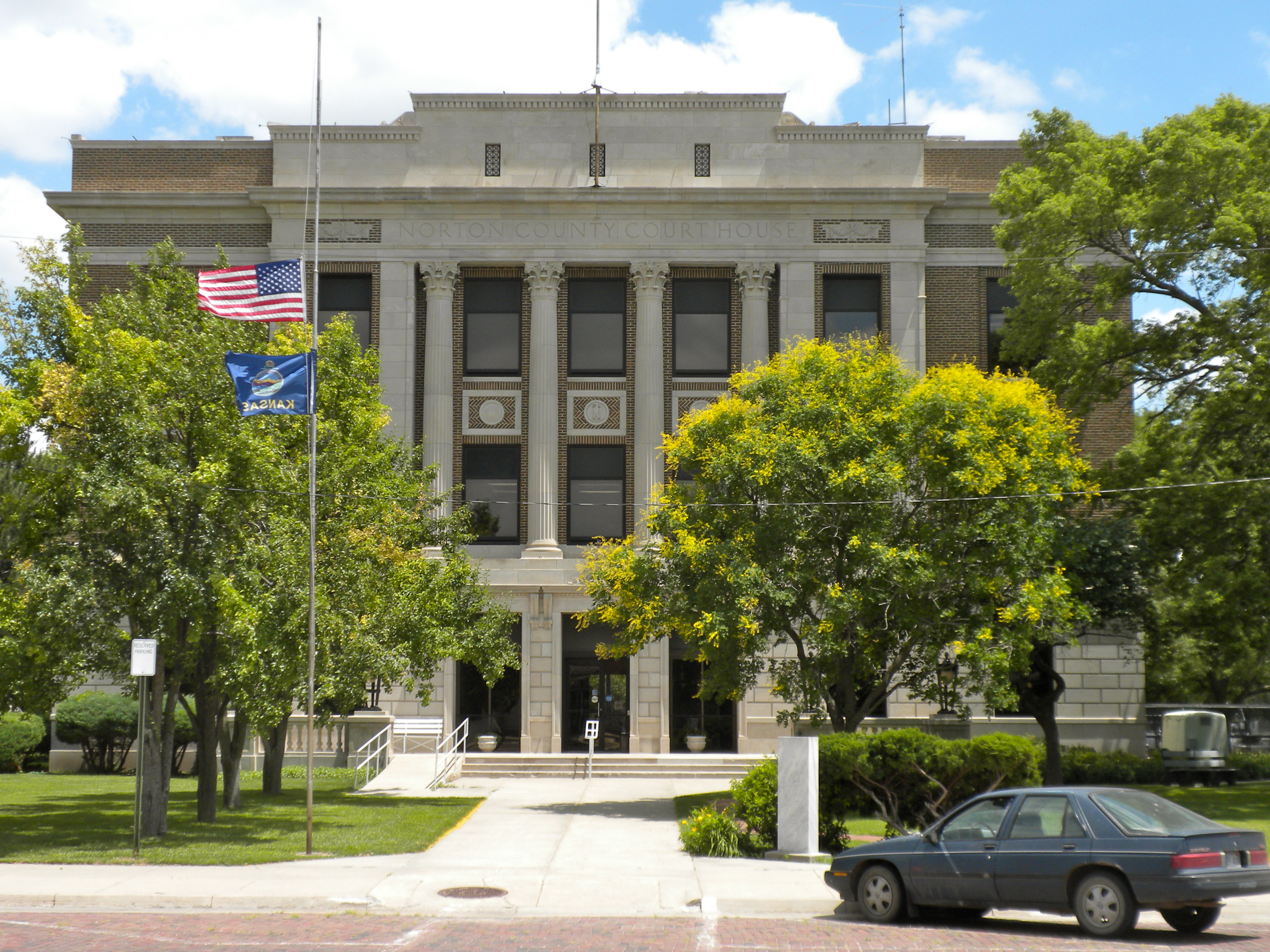
- Norton County Courthouse (built 1929)

- Location within Norton County and Kansas

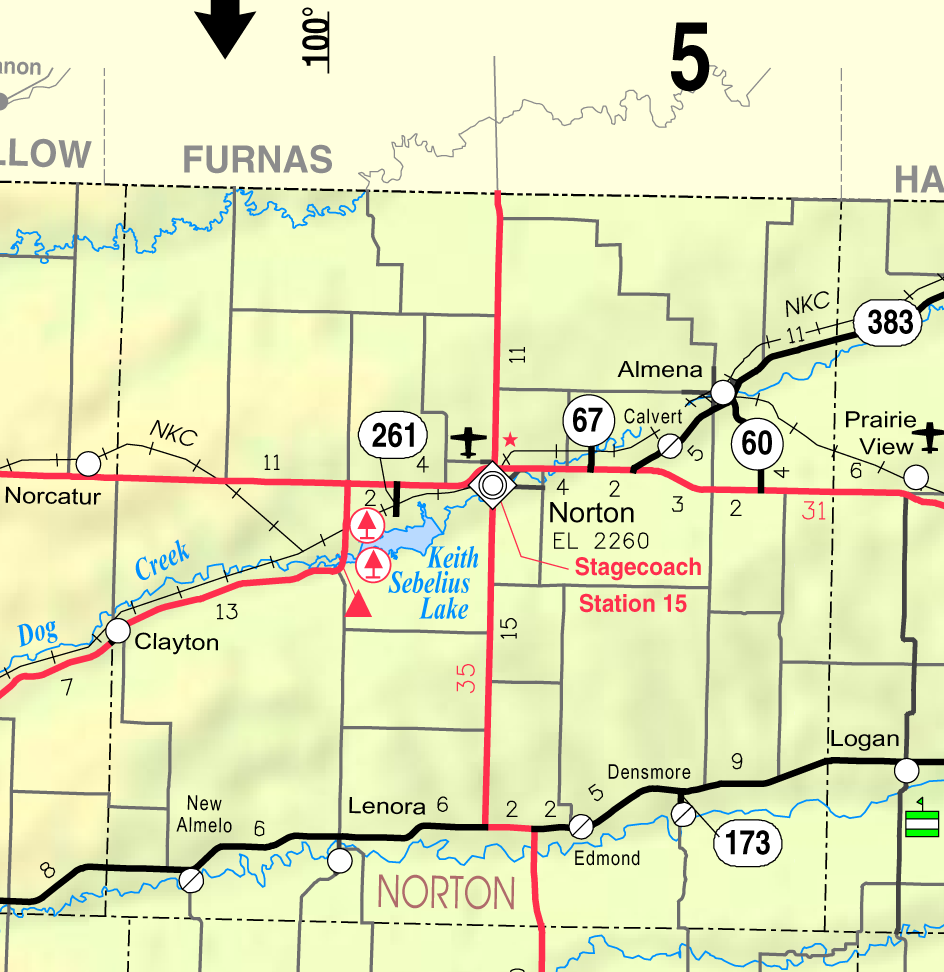
- KDOT map of Norton County (legend)
- Coordinates: 39°50′10″N 99°53′30″W
- Country: United States
- State: Kansas
- County: Norton
- Incorporated: 1885
- Named for: Orloff Norton

Area
  - Total: 1.91 sq mi (4.94 km^{2})
  - Land: 1.91 sq mi (4.94 km^{2})
  - Water: 0 sq mi (0.00 km^{2})
- Elevation: 2,330 ft (710 m)

Population (2020)
  - Total: 2,747
  - Density: 1,440/sq mi (556/km^{2})
- Time zone: UTC-6 (CST)
  - Summer (DST): UTC-5 (CDT)
- ZIP Code: 67654
- Area code: 785
- FIPS code: 20-51500
- GNIS ID: 485631
- Website: cityofnorton.com

Norton is a city in and the county seat of Norton County, Kansas, United States. As of the 2020 census, the population of the city was 2,747.

== History ==
Norton was founded in 1872. Like the county, it was named for Capt. Orloff Norton.

The first hotel was a log house, built in 1873.

One of the first recorded tornado pictures was taken in Norton, in 1909, by photographer Will Keller.

== Geography ==
According to the United States Census Bureau, the city has a total area of 1.93 square miles (5.00 km^{2}), all land. The city is situated on the north side of Prairie Dog Creek in Norton County. Before the Bureau of Reclamation constructed Keith Sebelius Lake in 1963, Norton was prone to frequent flooding. The construction of the Dam has since resolved the problem and created the current reservoir that sits 2.5 miles (4.0 km) southwest of Norton. The Nebraska border is located 11 miles (18 km) north of the city.

=== Climate ===
Norton is on the boundary of two climate zones, humid continental and semiarid. Temperatures can fluctuate drastically between the winter and summer seasons. Because of its location on the High Plains, snowfall totals can sometimes approach the yearly average after a single snowfall. Norton Dam recorded 118 °F (47.8 °C) on June 27-28, 2012, the highest June temperature in Kansas.

Climate data for Norton, Kansas, 1991–2020 normals, extremes 1893–2022
Month	Jan	Feb	Mar	Apr	May	Jun	Jul	Aug	Sep	Oct	Nov	Dec	Year
Record high °F (°C)	81 (27)	87 (31)	95 (35)	100 (38)	102 (39)	118 (48)	116 (47)	113 (45)	108 (42)	99 (37)	89 (32)	84 (29)	118 (48)
Mean maximum °F (°C)	66.9 (19.4)	71.8 (22.1)	81.3 (27.4)	88.1 (31.2)	94.0 (34.4)	100.1 (37.8)	103.4 (39.7)	101.9 (38.8)	97.6 (36.4)	91.3 (32.9)	78.7 (25.9)	68.2 (20.1)	104.6 (40.3)
Mean daily maximum °F (°C)	41.7 (5.4)	45.6 (7.6)	56.8 (13.8)	65.8 (18.8)	74.9 (23.8)	86.2 (30.1)	91.5 (33.1)	89.3 (31.8)	81.7 (27.6)	69.4 (20.8)	55.5 (13.1)	43.7 (6.5)	66.8 (19.4)
Daily mean °F (°C)	29.0 (−1.7)	32.2 (0.1)	42.0 (5.6)	51.1 (10.6)	61.2 (16.2)	72.3 (22.4)	77.8 (25.4)	75.7 (24.3)	67.3 (19.6)	54.6 (12.6)	41.4 (5.2)	31.1 (−0.5)	53.0 (11.6)
Mean daily minimum °F (°C)	16.2 (−8.8)	18.8 (−7.3)	27.3 (−2.6)	36.4 (2.4)	47.6 (8.7)	58.5 (14.7)	64.1 (17.8)	62.2 (16.8)	52.9 (11.6)	39.8 (4.3)	27.3 (−2.6)	18.4 (−7.6)	39.1 (3.9)
Mean minimum °F (°C)	−2.5 (−19.2)	.16 (−17.69)	9.7 (−12.4)	22.3 (−5.4)	33.9 (1.1)	47.4 (8.6)	55.1 (12.8)	52.8 (11.6)	39.3 (4.1)	22.7 (−5.2)	11.2 (−11.6)	0.8 (−17.3)	−7.6 (−22.0)
Record low °F (°C)	−27 (−33)	−25 (−32)	−17 (−27)	2 (−17)	19 (−7)	37 (3)	42 (6)	36 (2)	24 (−4)	6 (−14)	−11 (−24)	−27 (−33)	−27 (−33)
Average precipitation inches (mm)	0.56 (14)	0.69 (18)	1.37 (35)	2.28 (58)	3.55 (90)	3.01 (76)	3.52 (89)	2.76 (70)	1.75 (44)	1.92 (49)	0.89 (23)	0.77 (20)	23.07 (586)
Average snowfall inches (cm)	4.6 (12)	5.6 (14)	3.3 (8.4)	1.5 (3.8)	0.1 (0.25)	0.0 (0.0)	0.0 (0.0)	0.0 (0.0)	0.0 (0.0)	1.1 (2.8)	2.1 (5.3)	3.5 (8.9)	21.8 (55.45)
Average precipitation days (≥ 0.01 in)	2.9	3.4	4.9	6.8	9.1	8.4	8.1	6.9	5.0	5.2	3.5	3.1	67.3
Average snowy days (≥ 0.1 in)	2.3	2.4	1.6	0.7	0.1	0.0	0.0	0.0	0.0	0.3	1.0	2.1	10.5
Source 1: NOAA
Source 2: XMACIS2

== Demographics ==
Historical population
Census	Pop.	Note	%±
1880	634		—
1890	1,074		69.4%
1900	1,202		11.9%
1910	1,787		48.7%
1920	2,186		22.3%
1930	2,767		26.6%
1940	2,762		−0.2%
1950	3,060		10.8%
1960	3,345		9.3%
1970	3,627		8.4%
1980	3,400		−6.3%
1990	3,017		−11.3%
2000	3,012		−0.2%
2010	2,928		−2.8%
2020	2,747		−6.2%
U.S. Decennial Census

=== 2020 census ===
As of the 2020 census, Norton had a population of 2,747 people, with 1,213 households and 692 families. The median age was 42.0 years. The age distribution was 24.5% under 18, 6.7% from 18 to 24, 22.4% from 25 to 44, 24.9% from 45 to 64, and 21.5% 65 or older. For every 100 females, there were 95.4 males, and for every 100 females age 18 and over, there were 95.9 males age 18 and over. 0.0% of residents lived in urban areas, while 100.0% lived in rural areas.

The population density was 1,439.7 per square mile (555.9/km^{2}). There were 1,457 housing units at an average density of 763.6 per square mile (294.8/km^{2}). Of the 1,213 households, 26.0% had children under the age of 18 living in them. Of all households, 42.6% were married-couple households, 21.3% were households with a male householder and no spouse or partner present, and 28.9% were households with a female householder and no spouse or partner present. About 37.5% of all households were made up of individuals, and 15.9% had someone living alone who was 65 years of age or older. Of the housing units, 16.7% were vacant. The homeowner vacancy rate was 4.1% and the rental vacancy rate was 17.2%.

Racial composition as of the 2020 census
Race	Number	Percent
White	2,478	90.2%
Black or African American	23	0.8%
American Indian and Alaska Native	15	0.5%
Asian	20	0.7%
Native Hawaiian and Other Pacific Islander	0	0.0%
Some other race	30	1.1%
Two or more races	181	6.6%
Hispanic or Latino (of any race)	145	5.3%

Of the total population, 88.24% were non-Hispanic white.

Demographic estimates

The average household size was 2.7 and the average family size was 3.5. The percent of those with a bachelor's degree or higher was estimated to be 15.4% of the population.

Income and poverty

The 2016–2020 5-year American Community Survey estimates show that the median household income was $49,069 (with a margin of error of +/- $7,615) and the median family income was $59,648 (+/- $18,177). Males had a median income of $32,346 (+/- $3,580) versus $29,167 (+/- $11,470) for females. The median income for those above 16 years old was $31,683 (+/- $3,071). Approximately, 0.9% of families and 6.4% of the population were below the poverty line, including 4.7% of those under the age of 18 and 13.0% of those ages 65 or over.

=== 2010 census ===
As of the census of 2010, there were 2,928 people, 1,290 households, and 763 families residing in the city. The population density was 1,517.1 inhabitants per square mile (585.8/km^{2}). There were 1,465 housing units at an average density of 759.1 per square mile (293.1/km^{2}). The racial makeup of the city was 96.8% White, 0.2% African American, 0.1% Native American, 0.4% Asian, 0.5% from other races, and 1.9% from two or more races. Hispanic or Latino of any race were 3.3% of the population.

There were 1,290 households, of which 26.3% had children under the age of 18 living with them, 46.5% were married couples living together, 9.3% had a female householder with no husband present, 3.3% had a male householder with no wife present, and 40.9% were non-families. 36.1% of all households were made up of individuals, and 18.3% had someone living alone who was 65 years of age or older. The average household size was 2.20 and the average family size was 2.86.

The median age in the city was 44.8 years. 23.2% of residents were under the age of 18; 6.4% were between the ages of 18 and 24; 20.6% were from 25 to 44; 27.8% were from 45 to 64; and 22% were 65 years of age or older. The gender makeup of the city was 46.6% male and 53.4% female.

== Education ==
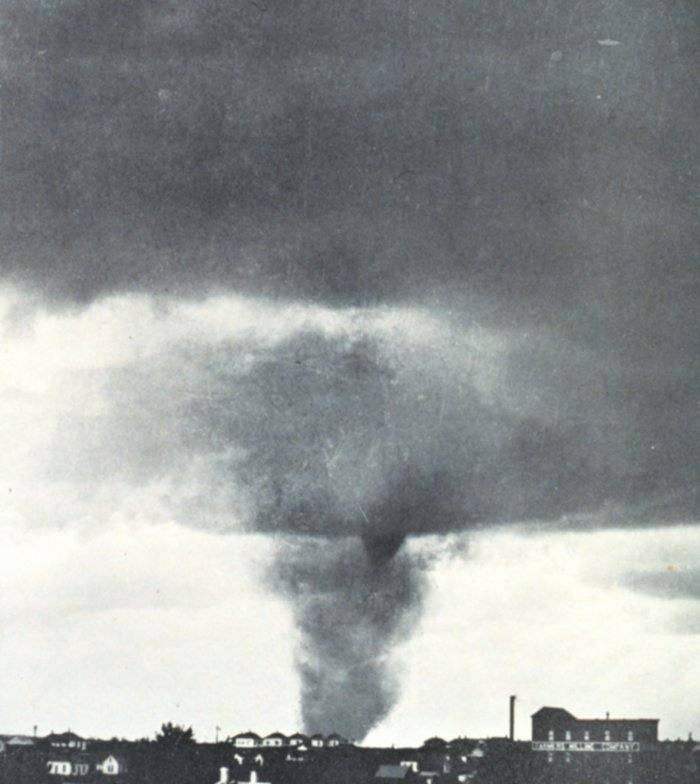
Tornado on June 24, 1909

The community is served by Norton USD 211 public school district.

Eisenhower Elementary School Constructed in 1954 and added on to in 1966 and 1990, Eisenhower Elementary serves students in USD 211 in grades ECD through sixth grade. Full day, every day kindergarten is offered as is a full range of special education services. Grades ECD through four are taught in self-contained classrooms. Grades 5 & 6 are departmentalized for instruction in math, reading, science, language arts and computer technology. Each teacher also teaches social studies and spelling to their homeroom students.

Norton Junior High School Constructed in 1937 and extensively remodeled in 1984, Norton Junior High School serves the 120+ students in grades 7 & 8. In addition to required classes of math, language arts, physical education/ health, science and social studies each junior high student receives 3 semesters of instruction in computer technology and digital media production and one semester of technology exploration (robotics, pneumatics, electronics, etc.). Elective classes are offered in vocal music, instrumental music, art, wood working, and family and consumer sciences.

Norton Community High School Constructed in 1975 & 1977, NCHS is a 3A high school with an enrollment of 200+. A comprehensive high school, NCHS is able to offer instruction in the areas of calculus, physics, human anatomy, chemistry II and foreign language. In addition to the regular academic curriculum, NCHS offers fine arts and vocational training.

The Norton Community High School Bluejays have won 17 Kansas State High School Activities Association state championships in wrestling, including six consecutive Class 3-2-1A state championships from 2012–17, and three consecutive Class 3-2-1A championships in 2004-06. Norton's football team won back-to-back Class 4A state championships in 1985 and 1986, and finished as state runners-up in 1989. The girls basketball and boys basketball teams won state championships in 1983 and 2003, respectively, and have made numerous state tournament appearances. NCHS also boasts programs in girls tennis, girls volleyball, boys golf, cross country, and track and field.

== Notable people ==
- Nick Allen, baseball player
- Chester Poage, murder victim
- William B. Ryan, mayor of Norton, attorney, Kansas state Senator, Kansas state district court judge
- Kathleen Sebelius (nee Gilligan), the former Secretary of Health and Human Services and a former governor of Kansas; daughter of former Ohio governor John J. Gilligan
- Keith Sebelius, former member of the United States House of Representatives from Kansas from 1969 to 1981
- K. Gary Sebelius, US Magistrate Judge, son of Keith Sebelius, husband of Kathleen Sebelius

== See also ==
- Norton Downtown Historic District
- Keith Sebelius Lake
