= Prairie Dog Creek =

River in Kansas and Nebraska, U.S.

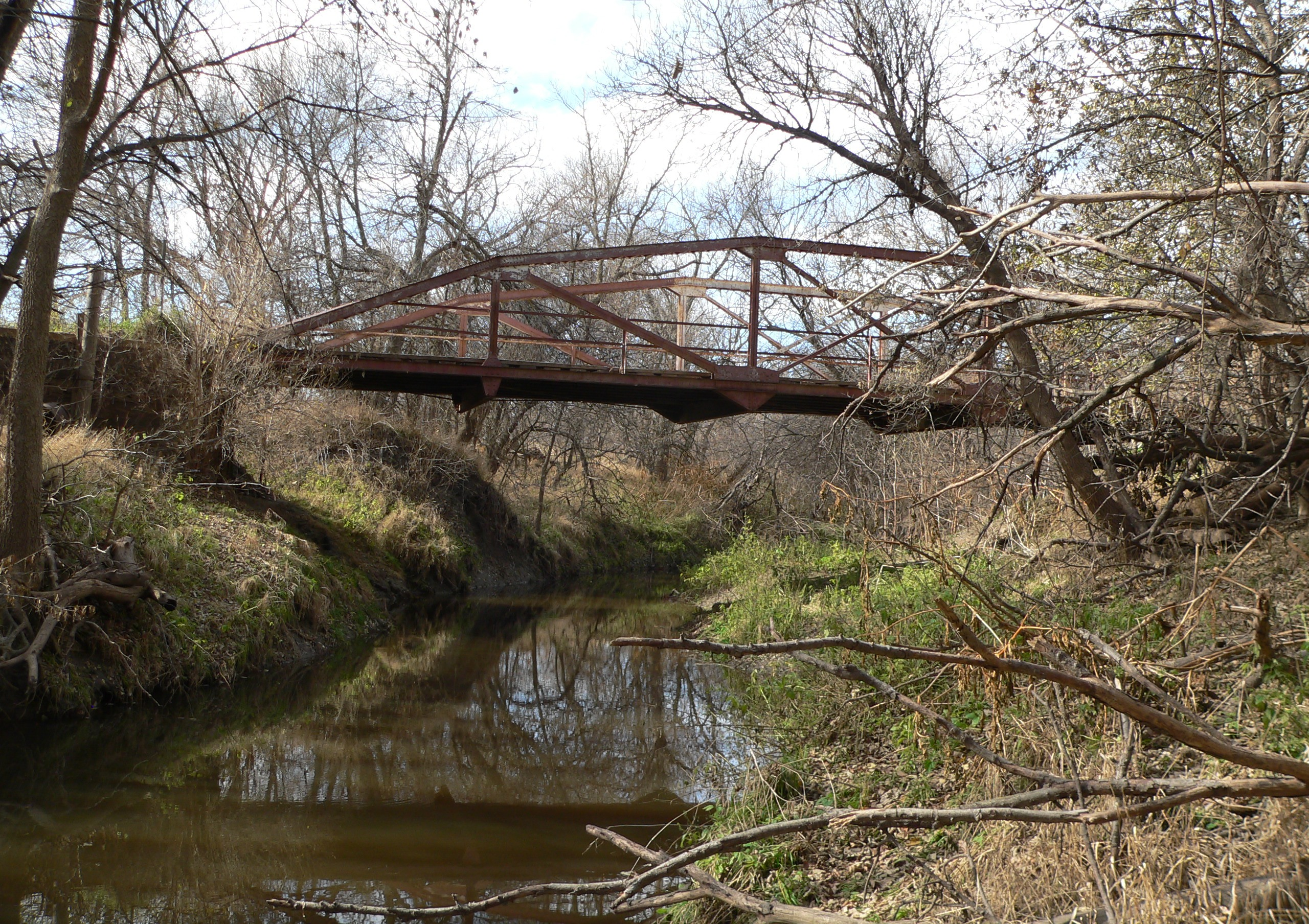

Location
- Country: United States
- State: Kansas, Nebraska

Physical characteristics
- Source
  - location: Thomas County, Kansas
  - coordinates: 39°18′45″N 101°18′22″W
  - elevation: 3,384 ft (1,031 m)
- Mouth: Harlan County Reservoir
  - location: Harlan County, Nebraska
  - coordinates: 40°03′41″N 99°15′13″W
  - elevation: 1,946 ft (593 m)
- Length: 246 mi (396 km)

Basin features
- Watersheds: Prairie Dog-Republican- Kansas-Missouri-Mississippi

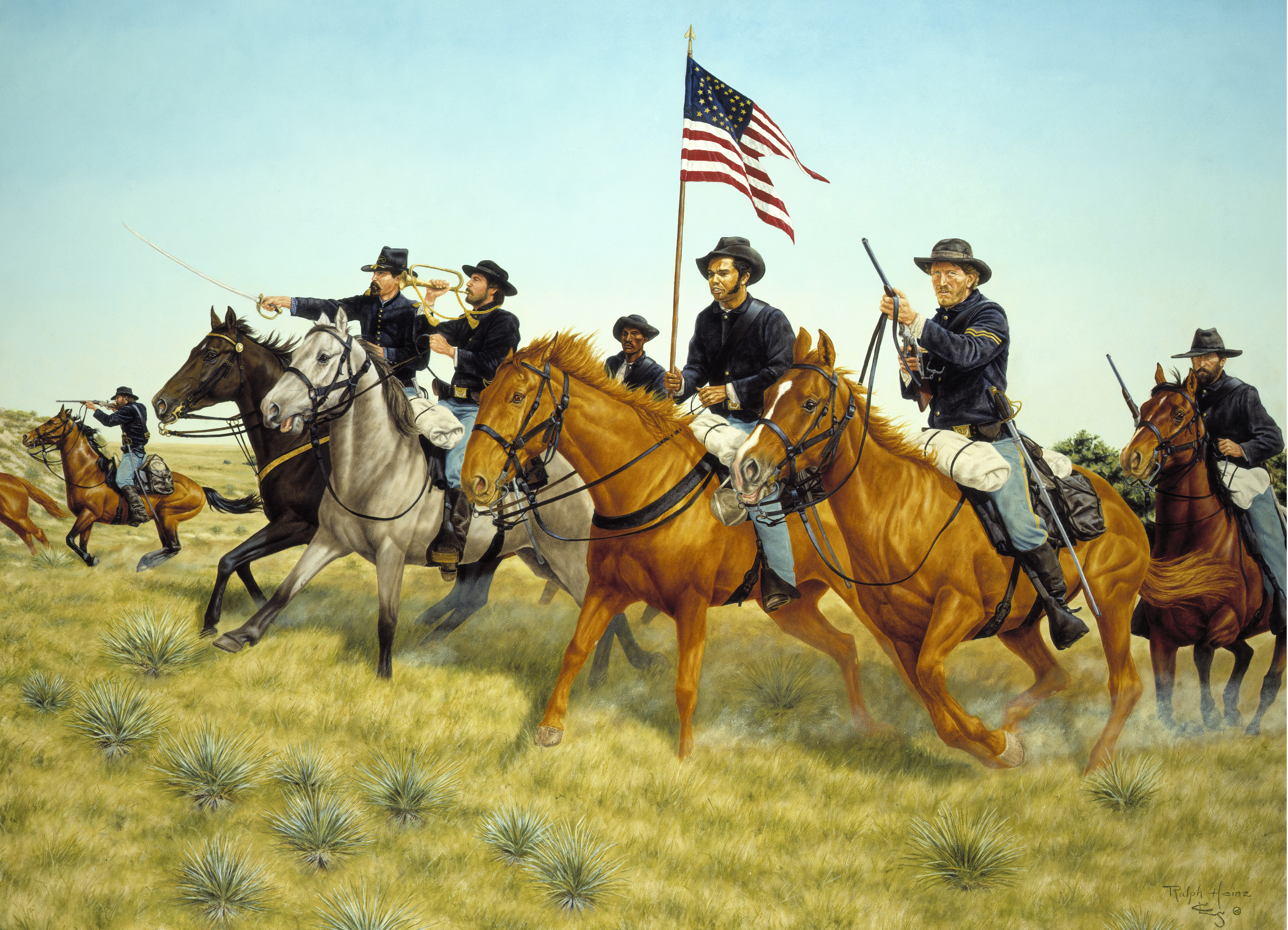
The Battle of Prairie Dog Creek, 1867

Prairie Dog Creek is a stream in the central Great Plains of North America. A tributary of the Republican River, it flows for 246 miles (396 km) through the American states of Kansas and Nebraska.

== Geography ==
Prairie Dog Creek originates in the High Plains of northwest Kansas. Its source lies in west-central Thomas County roughly 5 miles (8.0 km) southeast of Brewster, Kansas. From there, it flows generally northeast across northwestern Kansas. Southwest of Norton, Kansas, it is dammed to form Keith Sebelius Lake. From the reservoir's dam, the creek continues northeast to Harlan County in south-central Nebraska where it joins the Republican River to feed Harlan County Reservoir.

== History ==
The Battle of Prairie Dog Creek (August 21, 1867) ended the Army's offensive operations against the Indians on the Kansas frontier for the year.

In 1964, the U.S. Bureau of Reclamation completed a dam on the creek southwest of Norton, Kansas for flood control, irrigation, and municipal water supply, creating Keith Sebelius Lake.

== See also ==
- List of rivers of Kansas
