= Keith Sebelius =

American politician (1916–1982)

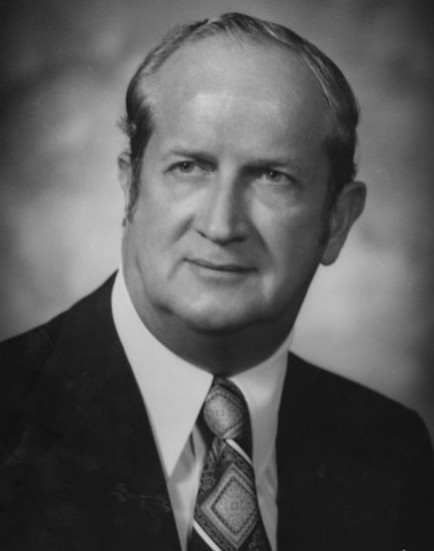

Member of the U.S. House of Representatives from Kansas's 1st district
- In office January 3, 1969 – January 3, 1981
- Preceded by: Bob Dole
- Succeeded by: Pat Roberts

Member of the Kansas Senate
- In office December 1962 – January 3, 1969
- Preceded by: William B. Ryan
- Constituency: 40th (1962–1965); 38th (1965–1969)

Personal details
- Born: Keith George Sebelius; September 10, 1916 Norton, Kansas, U.S.
- Died: August 5, 1982 (aged 65) Norton, Kansas, U.S.
- Party: Republican
- Spouse: Bette A. Roberts (m. 1949)
- Children: 2; including Keith Gary
- Relatives: Kathleen Sebelius (daughter-in-law)
- Education: Fort Hays State University; George Washington University
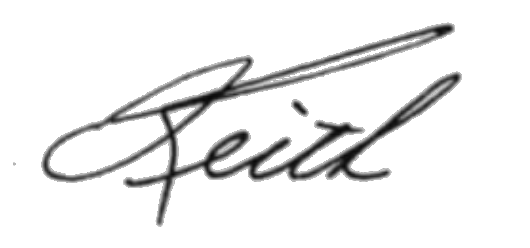
- Signature

Military service
- Allegiance: United States
- Branch/service: United States Army
- Battles/wars: World War II; Korean War

Keith George Sebelius (September 10, 1916 – August 5, 1982) was an American politician who served in the United States House of Representatives as a Republican.

He became active in politics following World War II and was later appointed to the Kansas Senate after narrowly losing two Republican primaries for the House of Representatives. He later entered the House of Representatives where he served for a decade before his death from prostate cancer in 1982.

== Early life ==
Keith George Sebelius was born on September 10, 1916, in Norton, Kansas to Carl Sebelius, who died when he was seven, and Minnie Sebelius. He grew up in Almena, Kansas and graduated from Almena High School. He attended Fort Hays State University, graduated in 1939, earned a law degree from George Washington University in 1942, and returned to Norton to practice law.

During World War II he served in the United States Army and worked for intelligence agencies to detect German U-boats in the Caribbean.

== Career ==
=== Early politics ===
Following the end of World War II, Sebelius served as a councilor on the Almena city council, and became mayor of the city.

In 1947, Sebelius was elected secretary of the Kansas Young Republicans Club and ran for president of the organization, but was defeated by Paul Lackie. On April 26, 1953, he was selected as the Junior American Legion Commander for the 6th district in Kansas and later became the senior commander in 1954. On September 5, 1955, Sebelius was elected Commander of the Kansas legion by a vote of 494 to 422, with his opponent being John K. Wells. In 1957, he was elected as president of Norton's Chamber of Commerce.

=== Kansas State Senate ===
On December 10, 1962, Sebelius was selected to replace state Senator William B. Ryan, who stepped down to become a district judge, and was appointed by Governor John Anderson Jr. In 1963, he introduced a bill that would put the entirety of Kansas in the Central Time Zone, but it failed.

During the 1964 elections he served as a delegate to the Republican district convention and he announced that he would seek reelection on April 1, 1964. After facing no opposition in the Republican primary Sebelius defeated Democratic nominee Vance Templeton in the general election.

=== House of Representatives ===
==== Elections ====
Sebelius twice ran unsuccessfully for the United States House of Representatives, losing both races by narrow margins. On January 8, 1958, he announced that he would run for the Republican nomination in Kansas's 6th Congressional District, but was narrowly defeated by incumbent Representative Wint Smith by 51 votes. He ran again in 1960, but was defeated by county attorney Bob Dole by 982 votes.

During the 1976 presidential election, Senator Bob Dole was selected as Ford's vice presidential running mate; had they won, it would have resulted in Dole's resignation from the Senate and a special election. It was speculated that Sebelius would be appointed to replace Dole. However, Governor Jimmy Carter won the presidential election causing Dole to remain in the Senate.

==== Tenure ====
In 1968, Dole left office to run for Senate and was succeeded by Sebelius, who served until 1981. In June 1969, he served in place of House Minority Whip Leslie C. Arends due to his absence and assisted Minority Leader Gerald Ford for one week. In May 1973, the National Federation of Independent Business named him Man of the Year for Kansas.

On November 15, 1973, he stated that "I frankly believe the man is telling the truth" after hearing Richard Nixon speak about Watergate for over an hour. On December 4, 1973, he voted in favor of House Minority Leader Gerald Ford's appointment as vice president after Spiro Agnew's resignation. After the transcript of the Nixon White House tapes were released he stated that they "are depressing to read and give an unfavorable view of the President". When asked what he thought of the possibility of Nixon refusing to comply with the Supreme Court's ruling in United States v. Nixon he stated that "it would be damn close to an impeachable offense". He voted in favor of a resolution allowing for live radio and television coverage of the impeachment inquiry by the House Judiciary committee. Following Nixon's resignation and Ford's accession to the presidency, Sebelius voted in favor of Nelson Rockefeller's appointment as vice president.

On April 25, 1980, Sebelius announced that he would not seek reelection to the House of Representatives and was succeeded by Pat Roberts, his administration aide.

== Later life ==
On January 11, 1981, a banquet was held in his honor and received telegrams from former President Gerald Ford and President-elect Ronald Reagan. On this occasion the Norton reservoir was renamed to Keith Sebelius Lake in his honor and on January 16, he was named as a Distinguished Kansan of the Year. In 1979, he was diagnosed with prostate cancer, and on August 5, 1982, he died in Norton County Hospital from it. He was buried in Norton, Kansas.

== Family ==
Sebelius married Elizabeth Adeline Roberts and had two children with her, R. Douglas Sebelius and K. Gary Sebelius, before his death in 1982. In 1974, K. Gary Sebelius married Kathleen Sebelius, the daughter of former Ohio Governor John J. Gilligan. She would later serve as the governor of Kansas from 2003 to 2009, and as United States Secretary of Health and Human Services.

== Political positions ==
=== Domestic ===
Sebelius introduced a constitutional amendment to legalize voluntary prayer in public buildings in 1971, but no action was taken on it. In April 1971, Kansas held a voter referendum to lower the voting age, which he supported; he later voted in favor of the Twenty-sixth Amendment to the United States Constitution. He criticized Nixon's decision to sell 10 million tons of United States grain to the Soviet Union at subsidized prices and later called for the resignation of Secretary of Agriculture Earl Butz.

When the House of Representatives voted on recognizing a holiday in honor of Martin Luther King Jr., Sebelius was one of the forty-eight representatives who abstained from the vote.

=== Foreign ===
In October 1969, he asked for his name to be removed from a letter created by Representative Sam Steiger to President Richard Nixon asking Nixon to point out to the North Vietnamese that the United States would not rule out any military option in gaining peace with honor, as the wording of the letter promoted an escalation of the war.

On July 18, 1973, he voted against the War Powers Resolution; after Nixon vetoed the bill Sebelius voted against the overriding of it on November 7, but the House and Senate voted to override Nixon's veto. On July 31, 1973, Sebelius voted in favor of a bill that would decrease the United States' military presence overseas by 100,000 and create a cap of 400,000 troops, but it was defeated by a vote of 243 to 163.

== Electoral history ==
Keith Sebelius electoral history

1949 Young Republicans Chairman election
Party	Candidate	Votes	%
Republican	Paul Lackie	167	67.34%
Republican	Keith Sebelius	56	22.58%
Republican	Charles D. Stough	25	10.08%
Total votes		248	100.00%

1958 Kansas 6th Congressional District Republican primary
Party	Candidate	Votes	%
Republican	Wint Smith (incumbent)	12,039	44.95%
Republican	Keith Sebelius	11,988	44.76%
Republican	Joel O. Gunnels	2,759	10.30%
Total votes		26,786	100.00%

1960 Kansas 6th Congressional District Republican primary
Party	Candidate	Votes	%
Republican	Bob Dole	16,033	45.15%
Republican	Keith Sebelius	15,051	42.39%
Republican	Phillip J. Doyle	4,423	12.46%
Total votes		35,507	100.00%

1964 Kansas 38th Senate District election
Party	Candidate	Votes	%
Republican	Keith Sebelius (incumbent)	10,823	54.18%
Democratic	Vance Templeton	9,152	45.82%
Total votes		19,975	100.00%

1968 Kansas 1st Congressional District Republican primary
Party	Candidate	Votes	%
Republican	Keith Sebelius	29,400	48.32%
Republican	Gerald Shadwick	24,304	39.95%
Republican	W. H. Crotinger	7,139	11.73%
Total votes		60,843	100.00%

1968 Kansas 1st Congressional District election
Party	Candidate	Votes	%	±%
Republican	Keith Sebelius	87,012	51.45%	−17.18%
Democratic	George W. Meeker	82,102	48.55%	+17.18%
Total votes		169,114	100.00%	

1970 Kansas 1st Congressional District election
Party	Candidate	Votes	%	±%
Republican	Keith Sebelius (incumbent)	83,923	56.98%	+5.41%
Democratic	Billy D. Jellison	63,791	43.19%	−5.41%
Total votes		147,714	100.00%	

1972 Kansas 1st Congressional District election
Party	Candidate	Votes	%	±%
Republican	Keith Sebelius (incumbent)	145,712	77.24%	+20.26%
Democratic	Morris Coover	40,678	21.56%	−21.46%
Prohibition	Daniel Scoggin	2,267	1.20%	+1.20%
Total votes		188,657	100.00%	

1974 Kansas 1st Congressional District election
Party	Candidate	Votes	%	±%
Republican	Keith Sebelius (incumbent)	101,565	58.42%	−18.82%
Democratic	Donald C. Smith	57,326	32.97%	+11.41%
American	Thelma Morgan	13,009	7.48%	+7.48%
Prohibition	Lorin P. Miller	1,968	1.13%	−0.07%
Total votes		173,868	100.00%	

1976 Kansas 1st Congressional District election
Party	Candidate	Votes	%	±%
Republican	Keith Sebelius (incumbent)	142,311	73.07%	+14.65%
Democratic	Randy C. Yowell	52,459	26.93%	−6.04%
Total votes		194,770	100.00%	

1978 Kansas 1st Congressional District election
Party	Candidate	Votes	%	±%
Republican	Keith Sebelius (incumbent)	131,037	100.00%	+26.93%
Total votes		131,037	100.00%	

U.S. House of Representatives
Preceded by Bob Dole	Member of the U.S. House of Representatives from Kansas's 1st congressional district 1969–1981	Succeeded by Pat Roberts
