= Norton USD 211 =

Public school district in Norton, Kansas

Address
- 105 E. Waverly St. Norton, Kansas, 67654; United States
- Coordinates: 39°49′58″N 99°53′15″W

District information
- Type: Public
- Grades: K to 12
- Schools: 3

Other information
- Website: usd211.org

Norton USD 211 is a public unified school district headquartered in Norton, Kansas, United States. The district includes the communities of Norton, Lenora, Edmond, Clayton, Dellvale, New Almelo, Oronoque, and nearby rural areas.

== Schools ==
The school district operates the following schools:

- Norton Community High School
- Norton Junior High School
- Eisenhower Elementary School

== History ==
In 2010 it absorbed the former West Solomon USD 213, which had dissolved.

It formerly operated Lenora Elementary School.

== See also ==
- Kansas State Department of Education
- Kansas State High School Activities Association
- List of high schools in Kansas
- List of unified school districts in Kansas
