= Oak Township, Kansas =

Township in Smith County, Kansas, U.S.

Oak Township
- Township
- Location within Smith County
- Coordinates: 39.784838°N 98.559521°W
- Country: United States
- State: Kansas
- County: Smith
- Established: 1875

Government
  - Trustee: Dianne Higby

Area
  - Total: 35.869 sq mi (92.90 km^{2})
  - Land: 35.844 sq mi (92.84 km^{2})
  - Water: 0.025 sq mi (0.065 km^{2}) 0.07%

Population (2020)
  - Total: 233
  - Density: 6.50/sq mi (2.51/km^{2})
- Time zone: UTC-6 (CST)
  - Summer (DST): UTC-5 (CDT)
- Area code: 785
- GNIS feature ID: 471967

Oak Township is a township in Smith County, Kansas, United States. As of the 2020 census, its population was 233.

== History ==
Oak Township was established in 1875 as one of the original nine townships of Smith County. The first settlers in what would become Oak Township was Thomas Decker and James H. Decker, who settled in the township on May 13, 1871. The first school in what would become Oak Township was built in 1873. The first church in the township was built in April 1877 by the Church of the United Brethren in Christ. It lost parts of its land to create other townships: White Rock Township, Cora Township, Blaine Township, Crystal Plains Township, and Webster Township.

== Geography ==
Oak Township covers an area of 35.869 square miles (92.90 square kilometers).

=== Communities ===
- Lebanon

=== Adjacent townships ===
White Rock Township, Smith County
Cora Township, Smith County	northwest	north	northeast	White Mound Township, Jewell County
Blaine Township, Smith County	west	self	east	Esbon Township, Jewell County
Crystal Plains Township, Smith County	southwest	south	southeast	Odessa Township, Jewell County
Webster Township, Smith County

== Transportation ==
=== Major highways ===
- US-36
- US-281

== Demographics ==
As of the 2020 census, there were 233 people and 176 households residing in the township. The population density was 6.50 people per square mile (2.51 people/km^{2}). There were 222 housing units. The racial makeup of the township was 93.6% White, 1.3% Black or African American, 0.4% Native American, 0.9% from some other race, and 3.9% from two or more races. Hispanics or Latinos of any race were 2.1% of the population.

There were 176 households: 55.1% were married couples living together, 29.5% had a female householder with no spouse present, and 13.6% had a male householder with no spouse present. The average family size was 2.36 people. 53.4% of people in the township older than 24 had a college degree, and the township had an employment rate of 62.5%.
