= Swan Township, Kansas =

Township in Smith County, Kansas, U.S.

Swan Township
- Township
- Location within Smith County
- Coordinates: 39.872359°N 99.010869°W
- Country: United States
- State: Kansas
- County: Smith

Government
  - Trustee: Ron Wolf

Area
  - Total: 35.71 sq mi (92.5 km^{2})
  - Land: 35.622 sq mi (92.26 km^{2})
  - Water: 0.088 sq mi (0.23 km^{2}) 0.25%

Population (2020)
  - Total: 28
  - Density: 0.79/sq mi (0.30/km^{2})
- Time zone: UTC-6 (CST)
  - Summer (DST): UTC-5 (CDT)
- Area code: 785
- GNIS feature ID: 471796

Swan Township is a township in Smith County, Kansas, United States. As of the 2020 census, its population was 28.

== History ==
Swan Township was created from parts of German Township and Cedar Township.

== Geography ==
Swan Township covers an area of 35.71 square miles (92.5 square kilometers).

=== Adjacent townships ===
German Township, Smith County
Sumner Township, Phillips County	northwest	north	northeast	Martin Township, Smith County
Crystal Township, Phillips County	west	self	east	Pleasant Township, Smith County
Plum Township, Phillips County	southwest	south	southeast	Lane Township, Smith County
Cedar Township, Smith County

== Demographics ==
As of the 2020 census, there were 28 people and 13 households residing in the township. The population density was 0.79 people per square mile (0.31 people/km^{2}). There were 13 housing units. The racial makeup of the township was 93.6% White, 3.6% Asian, and 10.7% from two or more races. Hispanics or Latinos of any race were 0.0% of the population.

There were 13 households: 100% were married couples living together. The average family size was 2.46 people. 56.0% of people in the township older than 24 had a college degree, and the township had an employment rate of 57.1%.
