= Center Township, Smith County, Kansas =

Township in Smith County, Kansas, U.S.

Center Township
- Township
- Location within Smith County

- Location within Kansas
- Coordinates: 39°47′11″N 98°46′58″W
- Country: United States
- State: Kansas
- County: Smith
- Established: 1875

Government
  - Trustee: Robert F. Bolton

Area
  - Total: 35.964 sq mi (93.15 km^{2})
  - Land: 35.947 sq mi (93.10 km^{2})
  - Water: 0.017 sq mi (0.044 km^{2}) 0.05%
- Elevation: 1,798 ft (548 m)

Population (2020)
  - Total: 1,771
  - Density: 49.27/sq mi (19.02/km^{2})
- Time zone: UTC-6 (CST)
  - Summer (DST): UTC-5 (CDT)
- Area code: 785
- GNIS feature ID: 471960

Center Township is a township in Smith County, Kansas, United States. As of the 2020 census, its population was 1,771.

== History ==
Center Township was established in 1875 as one of the original nine townships of Smith County. The first settlers in what would become Center Township was Thomas Lane and Anthony Robertson and their families, settling there on July 22, 1871. The first birth in Smith County took place in what would become the township, happening on August 25, 1871. It lost parts of its land to create other townships: Washington Township, Cora Township, Blaine Township, Crystal Plains Township, Banner Township, Lane Township, and Pleasant Township. Modern Harvey Township was moved to land that was partially in Center Township as well.

== Geography ==
Center Township covers an area of 35.964 square miles (93.15 square kilometers). Beaver Creek flows through it.

=== Communities ===
- part of Smith Center

=== Adjacent townships ===
Washington Township, Smith County
Pleasant Township, Smith County	northwest	north	northeast	Cora Township, Smith County
Lane Township, Smith County	west	self	east	Blaine Township, Smith County
Harvey Township, Smith County	southwest	south	southeast	Crystal Plains Township, Smith County
Banner Township, Smith County

== Transportation ==
Smith Center Municipal Airport lies within the township.

=== Major highways ===
- K-204
- US-36
- US-281

== Demographics ==
As of the 2020 census, there were 1,771 people and 771 households residing in the township. The population density was 49.27 people per square mile (19.02 people/km^{2}). There were 931 housing units. The racial makeup of the township was 94.9% White, 0.5% Native American, 0.2% Black or African American, 0.2% Asian, 1.1% from some other race, and 3.2% from two or more races. Hispanics or Latinos of any race were 2.3% of the population.

There were 771 households: 50.5% were married couples living together, 32.3% had a female householder with no spouse present, and 15.2% had a male householder with no spouse present. The average family size was 3.13 people. 32.9% of people in the township older than 24 had a college degree, and the township had an employment rate of 58.4%.
