= Harvey Township, Smith County, Kansas =

Township in Smith County, Kansas, U.S.

Harvey Township
- Township
- Location within Smith County
- Coordinates: 39.697048°N 98.902627°W
- Country: United States
- State: Kansas
- County: Smith
- Established: 1875

Government
  - Trustee: Arthur Kuhlmann

Area
  - Total: 35.815 sq mi (92.76 km^{2})
  - Land: 35.815 sq mi (92.76 km^{2})
  - Water: 0 sq mi (0 km^{2}) 0%

Population (2020)
  - Total: 93
  - Density: 2.6/sq mi (1.0/km^{2})
- Time zone: UTC-6 (CST)
  - Summer (DST): UTC-5 (CDT)
- Area code: 785
- GNIS feature ID: 472059

Harvey Township is a township in Smith County, Kansas, United States. As of the 2020 census, its population was 93.

== History ==
Harvey Township was established in 1875 as one of the original nine townships of Smith County. The first settlers in what would become Harvey Township was J. T. Morrison, J. H. Johnston, and seven others, who settled there in October 1870. The first school to be built in what would become the township was built in 1872, although it later burnt down. Later, Dor Township and Valley Township would be created from parts of Harvey Township. Modern Harvey Township was also moved to include land that used to be in Cedar Township, Center Township, and Houston Township. Modern Houston Township would gain land from former Harvey Township as well.

== Geography ==
Harvey Township covers an area of 35.815 square miles (92.76 square kilometers). The North Fork Solomon River flows through it, as well as Glen Rock Creek, Cedar Creek, and Beaver Creek.

=== Communities ===
- Cedar

=== Adjacent townships ===
Lane Township, Smith County
Cedar Township, Smith County	northwest	north	northeast	Center Township, Smith County
Valley Township, Smith County	west	self	east	Banner Township, Smith County
Dor Township, Smith County	southwest	south
Houston Township, Smith County

== Transportation ==
=== Major highways ===
- K-9

== Demographics ==
As of the 2020 census, there were 93 people and 41 households residing in the township. The population density was 2.6 people per square mile (1.0 people/km^{2}). There were 80 housing units. The racial makeup of the township was 95.7% White, 1.1% Native American, 1.1% from some other race, and 2.2% from two or more races. Hispanics or Latinos of any race were 1.1% of the population.

There were 41 households: 100% were married couples living together. The average family size was 3.15 people. 34.8% of people in the township older than 24 had a college degree, and the township had an employment rate of 83.8%.
