= Valley Township, Smith County, Kansas =

Township in Smith County, Kansas, U.S.

Valley Township
- Township
- Location within Smith County
- Coordinates: 39.690504°N 99.001417°W
- Country: United States
- State: Kansas
- County: Smith

Government
  - Trustee: Bonnie Slavik

Area
  - Total: 35.97 sq mi (93.2 km^{2})
  - Land: 35.963 sq mi (93.14 km^{2})
  - Water: 0.007 sq mi (0.018 km^{2}) 0.02%

Population (2020)
  - Total: 46
  - Density: 1.3/sq mi (0.49/km^{2})
- Time zone: UTC-6 (CST)
  - Summer (DST): UTC-5 (CDT)
- Area code: 785
- GNIS feature ID: 472053

Valley Township is a township in Smith County, Kansas, United States. As of the 2020 census, its population was 46.

== History ==
Valley Township was created from parts of Cedar Township and Harvey Township.

== Geography ==
Valley Township covers an area of 35.97 square miles (93.2 square kilometers). The North Fork Solomon River flows through it.

=== Communities ===
- Claudell

=== Adjacent townships ===
Cedar Township, Smith County
| Plum Township, Phillips County | northwest | north | northeast | Lane Township, Smith County |
| Kirwin Township, Phillips County | west | self | east | Harvey Township, Smith County |
| Valley Township, Phillips County | southwest | south |
Dor Township, Smith County

== Transportation ==
=== Major highways ===
- K-9

== Demographics ==
As of the 2020 census, there were 46 people and 21 households residing in the township. The population density was 1.4 people per square mile (0.54 people/km^{2}). There were 29 housing units. The racial makeup of the township was 100% White. Hispanics or Latinos of any race were 0.0% of the population.

There were 21 households: 71.4% were married couples living together and 28.6% had a female householder with no spouse present. The average family size was 1.87 people. 58.8% of people in the township older than 24 had a college degree, and the township had an employment rate of 76.5%.
