= Banner Township, Smith County, Kansas =

Township in Smith County, Kansas, U.S.

Banner Township
- Township
- Location within Smith County
- Coordinates: 39.698159°N 98.78551°W
- Country: United States
- State: Kansas
- County: Smith

Government
  - Trustee: Denton Schoen

Area
  - Total: 35.994 sq mi (93.22 km^{2})
  - Land: 35.994 sq mi (93.22 km^{2})
  - Water: 0 sq mi (0 km^{2}) 0%

Population (2020)
  - Total: 48
  - Density: 1.3/sq mi (0.51/km^{2})
- Time zone: UTC-6 (CST)
  - Summer (DST): UTC-5 (CDT)
- Area code: 785
- GNIS feature ID: 472066

Banner Township is a township in Smith County, Kansas, United States. As of the 2020 census, its population was 48.

== History ==
Banner Township was created from parts of Center Township and Houston Township.

== Geography ==
Banner Township covers an area of 35.994 square miles (93.22 square kilometers). Beaver Creek and Spring Creek flow through it.

=== Communities ===
- part of Smith Center

=== Adjacent townships ===
Center Township, Smith County
Lane Township, Smith County	northwest	north	northeast	Blaine Township, Smith County
Harvey Township, Smith County	west	self	east	Crystal Plains Township, Smith County
Houston Township, Smith County	southwest	south	southeast	Garfield Township, Smith County
Harlan Township, Smith County

== Transportation ==
=== Major highways ===
- US-281

== Demographics ==
As of the 2020 census, there were 48 people and 13 households residing in the township. The population density was 1.3 people per square mile (0.50 people/km^{2}). There were 13 housing units. The racial makeup of the township was 95.8% White and 4.2% from two or more races. Hispanics or Latinos of any race were 0.0% of the population.

There were 13 households: 100% were married couples living together. The average family size was 1.92 people. 68.0% of people in the township older than 24 had a degree, and the township had an employment rate of 68.0%.
