= Albert Wagner =

Albert Wagner may refer to:

- Albert Wagner (architect) (1848–1898), architect from Germany who worked in New York City
- Albert Wagner (veteran) (1899–2007), veteran of the First World War
- Albert C. Wagner (1911–1987), director of the New Jersey Department of Corrections

== See also ==
- Butts Wagner (1871–1928), American baseball player
