= Blaine Township, Smith County, Kansas =

Township in Smith County, Kansas, U.S.

Blaine Township
- Township
- Location within Smith County
- Coordinates: 39.785017°N 39.785017°W
- Country: United States
- State: Kansas
- County: Smith

Government
  - Trustee: Karen Baetz

Area
  - Total: 36.018 sq mi (93.29 km^{2})
  - Land: 36.004 sq mi (93.25 km^{2})
  - Water: 0.014 sq mi (0.036 km^{2}) 0.04%

Population (2020)
  - Total: 37
  - Density: 1.0/sq mi (0.40/km^{2})
- Time zone: UTC-6 (CST)
  - Summer (DST): UTC-5 (CDT)
- Area code: 785
- GNIS feature ID: 471961

Blaine Township is a township in Smith County, Kansas, United States. As of the 2020 census, its population was 37.

== History ==
Blaine Township was created from parts of Center Township and Oak Township.

== Geography ==
Blaine Township covers an area of 36.018 square miles (93.29 square kilometers).

=== Communities ===
- Bellaire

=== Adjacent townships ===
Cora Township, Smith County
Washington Township, Smith County	northwest	north	northeast	White Rock Township, Smith County
Center Township, Smith County	west	self	east	Oak Township, Smith County
Banner Township, Smith County	southwest	south	southeast	Webster Township, Smith County
Crystal Plains Township, Smith County

== Transportation ==
=== Major highways ===
- US-36
- US-281

== Demographics ==
As of the 2020 census, there were 37 people and no households residing in the township. The population density was 1.0 people per square mile (0.39 people/km^{2}). There were 17 housing units. The racial makeup of the township was 97.3% White and 2.7% Asian. Hispanics or Latinos of any race were 0.0% of the population.
