= K-9 (Kansas highway) =

State highway in Kansas, U.S.

K-9
- K-9 highlighted in red

Route information
- Maintained by KDOT and the cities of Concordia, Clyde and Clifton
- Length: 317.937 mi (511.670 km)

Major junctions
- West end: K-123 near Dresden
- US-283 near Edmond; US-183 in Glade; US-281 near Osborne; US-24 in Beloit; US-81 in Concordia; US-77 in Waterville; US-75 in Netawaka; US-159 near Muscotah
- East end: US-73 near Lancaster

Location
- Country: United States
- State: Kansas
- Counties: Sheridan, Decatur, Norton, Phillips, Smith, Osborne, Mitchell, Cloud, Washington, Clay, Marshall, Nemaha, Jackson, Atchison

Highway system
- Kansas State Highway System; Interstate; US; State; Spurs
← K-8	→ K-10

K-9 is a 317.937-mile-long (511.670 km) state highway in the U.S. state of Kansas. The highway goes east–west through Kansas. It has its western terminus south of Dresden at an intersection with K-123 and an eastern terminus at its junction with U.S. Route 73 near Lancaster. K-9 is the second longest state highway after K-4.

== Route description ==
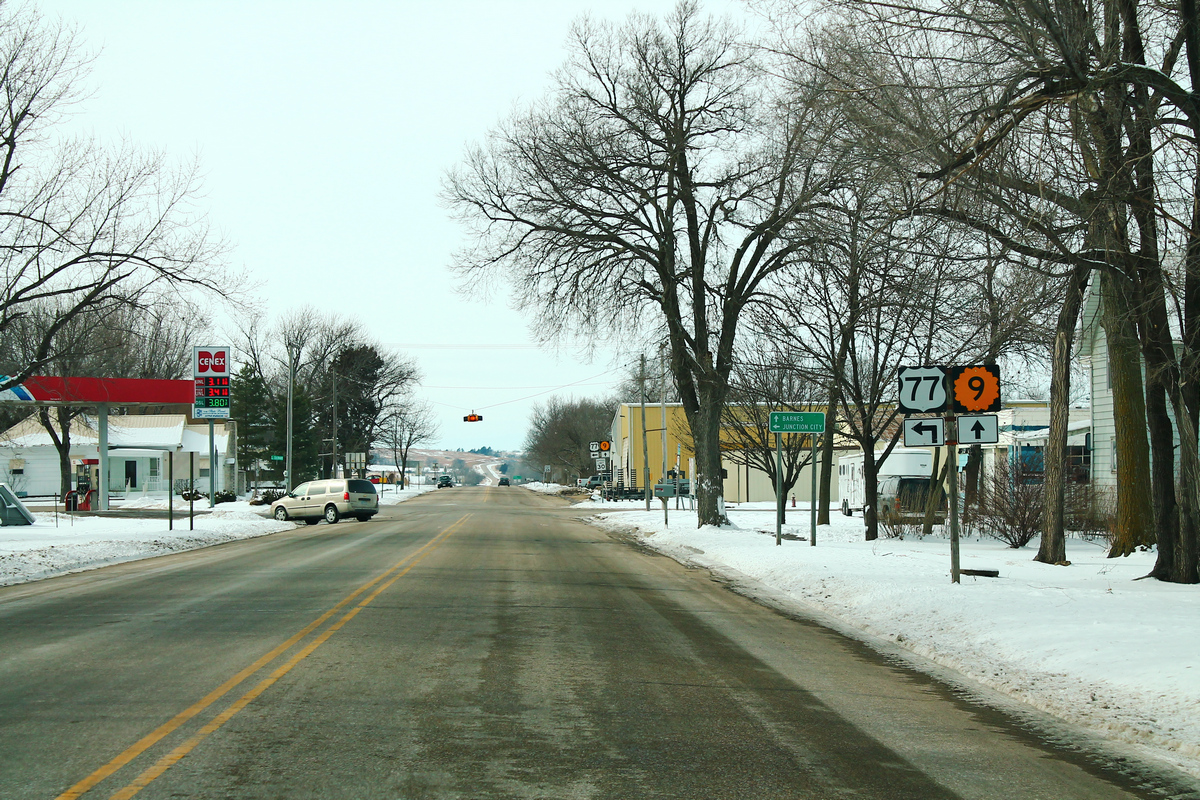
K-9 as it passes through Waterville with U.S. 77

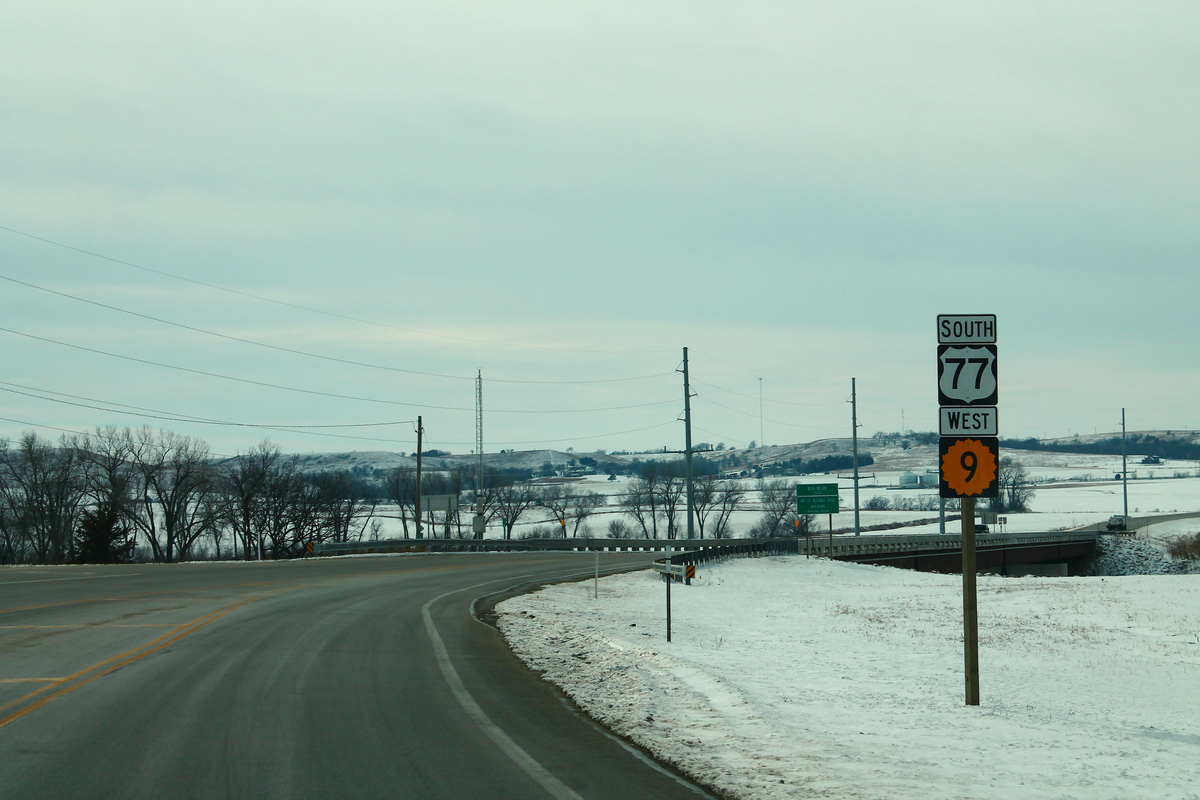
K-9 and US 77 south of Marysville

K-9 begins south of Dresden at K-123 on the border between Sheridan and Decatur counties. After starting out along the border, it gradually follows an east-northeast alignment, as the highway parallels the north fork of the Solomon River. After passing through Lenora, K-9 has a short overlap with US-283. It passes through Edmond and intersects K-173 near Densmore, then continues east through Logan and Speed. At Glade, K-9 intersects US-183. East of Glade, K-9 follows an east-southeast trajectory which goes north of Kirwin, then goes through Cedar and Gaylord before intersecting US-281. K-9 then goes southeast through Portis with US-281, then turns south. At US-24, K-9 turns east with US-24, ending its overlap with US-281.

K-9 and US-24 then overlap eastward through Downs, where they intersect K-181. The overlap continues through Cawker City and then intersects K-128. After passing through Glen Elder and Solomon Rapids. K-9 and US-24 intersect K-14 at Beloit, then the overlap ends shortly after that intersection. K-9 continues east from Beloit, then follows alternating northerly and easterly alignments before intersecting K-28 west of Concordia. It turns east into Concordia and intersects US-81 there.

Going east from Concordia, K-9 goes east to Clyde and Clifton, then intersects K-15. K-9 and K-15 then overlap, intersecting K-115 near Palmer and passing through Linn before meetin K-148. K-9 and K-148 then overlap going east, intersecting K-119 near Greenleaf, before ending their overlap at Barnes. It continues east to Waterville, where it begins an overlap with US-77, and the overlap with US-77 continues east to Blue Rapids.

From Blue Rapids, K-9 continues east to Frankfort, where it intersects K-99. They overlap going north from Frankfort, then K-9 turns east and intersects K-87 near Vliets, K-88 near Vermillion and K-187 at Centralia. East of Centralia, K-9 intersects K-63, and they overlap going south into Corning. K-9 then turns east at Corning, and then intersects K-62 southwest of Goff. It goes northeast into Goff, then goes southeasterly through Wetmore before intersecting US-75 near Netawaka.

K-9 continues southeast through Netawaka, then turns east through Whiting. Near Muscotah, K-9 intersects US-159, then they turn south together through Muscotah. They then overlap going east, then south into Effingham. East of Effingham, the K-9/US-159 overlap ends, and K-9 alternates between northbound and eastbound alignments on its way towards Lancaster, ending south of Lancaster at US-73.

The Kansas Department of Transportation (KDOT) tracks the traffic levels on its highways, and in 2018, they determined that on average the traffic varied from 170 vehicles per day near the western terminus to 4850 vehicles per day slightly east of US-81. The second highest was 4740 vehicles per day slightly east of K-14. The section of K-9 along the overlap with US-24 and the overlap with US-77 is included in the National Highway System. The National Highway System is a system of highways important to the nation's defense, economy, and mobility. K-9 also connects to the National Highway System at its junction with US-183 in Glade, US-81 in Concordia, and US-75 in Netawaka. All but 4.697 miles (7.559 km) of K-9's alignment is maintained by KDOT. The entire 2.645-mile (4.257 km) section within Concordia is maintained by the city. The entire 1.052-mile (1.693 km) section within Clyde is maintained by the city. The entire one-mile (1.6 km) section within Clifton is maintained by the city.

== History ==
K-9 originally began at US-383 but was realigned sometime between 1941 and 1956 to start at K-123. In a February 27, 1942 resolution, K-9 was realigned to run from Dresden east, then south to the old K-9 alignment in New Almelo. In a December 20, 1950 resolution, K-9 was realigned to go west from Allison to K-123 along the Decatur–Sheridan county line.

K-9 was the Kansas Segment of the Great White Way; one of the first Intrastate highways - Chicago to Colorado Springs, Colorado. The name came from white limestone gravel making it an all-weather road. It ran alongside railroad routes much of the way with every other telegraph or telephone pole bearing a painted white stripe assuring motorists they were on the right road. Worth a Google dive for history buffs (K-9 Kansas Great White Way)

== Major intersections ==
County	Location	mi	km	Destinations	Notes
Sheridan–Decatur county line		0.000	0.000	K-123 – Selden, Hoxie, Dresden	Western terminus
Norton		29.734	47.852	US-283 north – Norton	West end of concurrency with US-283
Norton		31.738	51.077	US-283 south – Hill City	East end of concurrency with US-283
Norton		38.220	61.509	K-173 south – Densmore	Northern terminus of K-173
Phillips	Glade	61.933	99.672	US-183 (Central Avenue) – Phillipsburg, Stockton	
Smith		90.493	145.634	US-281 north – Smith Center	West end of concurrency with US-281
Osborne		102.361	164.734	US-24 west / US-281 south – Osborne	East end of concurrency with US-281; west end of concurrency with US-24
Osborne	Downs	110.324	177.549	K-181 (Morgan Avenue) – Lebanon, Tipton	
Mitchell		121.567	195.643	K-128 north to US-36	Southern terminus of K-128
Mitchell	Beloit	134.048	215.729	K-14 – Beloit, Jewell	
Mitchell	Beloit	134.777	216.903	US-24 east – Clay Center	East end of concurrency with US-24
Cloud		161.932	260.604	K-28 west (Shell Road) – Jamestown, Randall	Eastern terminus of K-28
Cloud	Concordia	164.582	264.869	US-81 (Lincoln Street) – Belleville, Salina	
Clay–Washington county line		195.006	313.832	K-15 south (Navajo Road) – Clay Center	West end of concurrency with K-15
Washington		199.526	321.106	K-115 west (Palmer Avenue) – Palmer	Eastern terminus of K-115
Washington		207.100	333.295	K-15 north (Quivira Road) / K-148 west (10th Road) – Washington, Agenda	East end of concurrency with K-15; west end of concurrency with K-148; K-15 north is former K-15W, K-9/K-148 east of this point is former K-15E
Washington		211.061	339.670	K-119 north (Upland Road) – Greenleaf	Southern terminus of K-119
Washington		217.152	349.472	K-148 east (All-American Road) to US-36	East end of concurrency with K-148; former K-15E
Marshall	Waterville	223.608	359.862	US-77 south (Colorado Avenue) – Junction City	West end of concurrency with US-77
Marshall		230.037	370.209	US-77 north – Marysville	East end of concurrency with US-77
Marshall	Frankfort	242.303	389.949	K-99 south (Kansas Avenue) – Wamego	West end of concurrency with K-99
Marshall		243.954	392.606	K-99 north (Road to Oz Highway) – Beattie	East end of concurrency with K-99
Marshall		248.454	399.848	K-87 to US-36 – Vliets	
Marshall		252.050	405.635	K-88 south – Vermillion	Northern terminus of K-88
Nemaha	Centralia	259.476	417.586	K-187 north (2nd Street) to US-36	Southern terminus of K-187
Nemaha		264.448	425.588	K-63 north – Seneca	West end of concurrency with K-63
Nemaha	Corning	269.462	433.657	K-63 south – St. Marys	East end of concurrency with K-63
Nemaha		273.491	440.141	K-62 south – Soldier	Northern terminus of K-62
Jackson	Netawaka	286.703	461.404	US-75 – Fairview, Holton	
Atchison		299.032	481.245	US-159 north – Horton	West end of concurrency with US-159
Atchison		313.021	503.758	US-159 south – Nortonville	East end of concurrency with US-159
Atchison	Lancaster	317.937	511.670	US-73 – Atchison, Hiawatha	Eastern terminus; continues north as Jewell Road
1.000 mi = 1.609 km; 1.000 km = 0.621 mi: Concurrency terminus

== See also ==
- List of state highways in Kansas
