= Lane Township, Smith County, Kansas =

Township in Smith County, Kansas, U.S.

Lane Township
- Township
- Location within Smith County
- Coordinates: 39.785485°N 98.898905°W
- Country: United States
- State: Kansas
- County: Smith

Government
  - Trustee: Lisa James

Area
  - Total: 35.861 sq mi (92.88 km^{2})
  - Land: 35.848 sq mi (92.85 km^{2})
  - Water: 0.013 sq mi (0.034 km^{2}) 0.04%

Population (2020)
  - Total: 86
  - Density: 2.4/sq mi (0.93/km^{2})
- Time zone: UTC-6 (CST)
  - Summer (DST): UTC-5 (CDT)
- Area code: 785
- GNIS feature ID: 471954

Lane Township is a township in Smith County, Kansas, United States. As of the 2020 census, its population was 86.

== History ==
Lane Township was created from parts of Cedar Township and Center Township.

== Geography ==
Lane Township covers an area of 35.861 square miles (92.88 square kilometers). Beaver Creek flows through it.

=== Communities ===
- Athol

=== Adjacent townships ===
Pleasant Township, Smith County
Swan Township, Smith County	northwest	north	northeast	Washington Township, Smith County
Cedar Township, Smith County	west	self	east	Center Township, Smith County
Valley Township, Smith County	southwest	south	southeast	Banner Township, Smith County
Harvey Township, Smith County

== Transportation ==
=== Major highways ===
- US-36
- K-8

== Demographics ==
As of the 2020 census, there were 86 people and 35 households residing in the township. The population density was 2.4 people per square mile (0.93 people/km^{2}). There were 39 housing units. The racial makeup of the township was 97.7% White, 1.2% Asian, and 1.2% from two or more races. Hispanics or Latinos of any race were 0.0% of the population.

There were 35 households: 68.6% were married couples living together, 22.9% had a male householder with no spouse present, and 8.6% had a female householder with no spouse present. The average family size was 2.66 people. 39.6% of people in the township older than 24 had a college degree, and the township had an employment rate of 62.1%.
