= Martin Township, Kansas =

Township in Smith County, Kansas, U.S.

Martin Township
- Township
- Location within Smith County
- Coordinates: 39.977821°N 98.903657°W
- Country: United States
- State: Kansas
- County: Smith

Government
  - Trustee: Jerry Baetz

Area
  - Total: 35.814 sq mi (92.76 km^{2})
  - Land: 35.682 sq mi (92.42 km^{2})
  - Water: 0.132 sq mi (0.34 km^{2}) 0.37%

Population (2020)
  - Total: 22
  - Density: 0.62/sq mi (0.24/km^{2})
- Time zone: UTC-6 (CST)
  - Summer (DST): UTC-5 (CDT)
- Area code: 785
- GNIS feature ID: 471809

Martin Township is a township in Smith County, Kansas, United States. As of the 2020 census, its population was 22.

== History ==
Martin Township was created from parts of German Township and Beaver Township.

== Geography ==
Martin Township covers an area of 35.814 square miles (92.76 square kilometers).

=== Communities ===
- Reamsville

=== Adjacent townships ===
Washington Township, Franklin County, Nebraska
East Bloomington Township, Franklin County, Nebraska	northwest	north
German Township, Smith County	west	self	east	Beaver Township, Smith County
Swan Township, Smith County	southwest	south	southeast	Washington Township, Smith County
Pleasant Township, Smith County

== Transportation ==
=== Major highways ===
- K-8

== Demographics ==
As of the 2020 census, there were 22 people residing in the township. The population density was 0.62 people per square mile (0.24 people/km^{2}). The racial makeup of the township was 95.5% White and 4.5% Native American.
