= Logan Township, Smith County, Kansas =

Township in Smith County, Kansas, U.S.

Logan Township
- Township
- Location within Smith County
- Coordinates: 39.962378°N 98.557876°W
- Country: United States
- State: Kansas
- County: Smith

Government
  - Trustee: Gary McCartney

Area
  - Total: 35.823 sq mi (92.78 km^{2})
  - Land: 35.642 sq mi (92.31 km^{2})
  - Water: 0.181 sq mi (0.47 km^{2}) 0.50%

Population (2020)
  - Total: 35
  - Density: 0.98/sq mi (0.38/km^{2})
- Time zone: UTC-6 (CST)
  - Summer (DST): UTC-5 (CDT)
- Area code: 785
- GNIS feature ID: 471846

Logan Township is a township in Smith County, Kansas, United States. As of the 2020 census, its population was 35.

== History ==
Logan Township was created from part of Pawnee Township.

== Geography ==
Logan Township covers an area of 35.823 square miles (92.78 square kilometers). White Rock Creek flows through it, as well as Penny Creek.

=== Adjacent townships ===
Webster County, Nebraska
		north
Pawnee Township, Smith County	west	self	east	Highland Township, Jewell County
Cora Township, Smith County	southwest	south	southeast	White Mound Township, Jewell County
White Rock Township, Smith County

== Transportation ==
=== Major highways ===
- US-281

== Demographics ==
As of the 2020 census, there were 35 people and 9 households residing in the township. The population density was 0.98 people per square mile (0.38 people/km^{2}). There were 9 housing units. The racial makeup of the township was 91.4% White, 2.9% Black or African American, and 5.7% from two or more races. Hispanics or Latinos of any race were 0.0% of the population.

There were 9 households: 100% were married couples living together. The average family size was 3.67 people. 60.0% of people in the township older than 24 had a college degree, and the township had an employment rate of 65.2%.
