= Pleasant Township, Smith County, Kansas =

Township in Smith County, Kansas, U.S.

Pleasant Township
- Township
- Location within Smith County
- Coordinates: 39.874268°N 98.896331°W
- Country: United States
- State: Kansas
- County: Smith

Government
  - Trustee: Tony Blickenstaff

Area
  - Total: 35.801 sq mi (92.72 km^{2})
  - Land: 35.782 sq mi (92.67 km^{2})
  - Water: 0.019 sq mi (0.049 km^{2}) 0.05%

Population (2020)
  - Total: 33
  - Density: 0.92/sq mi (0.36/km^{2})
- Time zone: UTC-6 (CST)
  - Summer (DST): UTC-5 (CDT)
- Area code: 785
- GNIS feature ID: 471815

Pleasant Township is a township in Smith County, Kansas, United States. As of the 2020 census, its population was 33.

== History ==
Pleasant Township was created from parts of German Township, Beaver Township, Center Township, and Cedar Township.

== Geography ==
Pleasant Township covers an area of 35.801 square miles (92.72 square kilometers). Beaver Creek flows through it. The township is home to the Home on the Range Cabin, which inspired the state song of Kansas.

=== Adjacent townships ===
Martin Township, Smith County
German Township, Smith County	northwest	north	northeast	Beaver Township, Smith County
Swan Township, Smith County	west	self	east	Washington Township, Smith County
Cedar Township, Smith County	southwest	south	southeast	Center Township, Smith County
Lane Township, Smith County

== Transportation ==
=== Major highways ===
- K-8

== Demographics ==
As of the 2020 census, there were 33 people and 4 households residing in the township. The population density was 0.92 people per square mile (0.36 people/km^{2}). There were 18 housing units. The racial makeup of the township was 84.8% White, and 15.2% from some other race. Hispanics or Latinos of any race were 9.1% of the population.

There were 4 households: 100% had a female householder with no spouse present. 0.0% of people in the township older than 24 had a college degree, and the township had an employment rate of 0.0%.
