= Beaver Township, Smith County, Kansas =

Township in Smith County, Kansas, U.S.

Beaver Township
- Township
- Location within Smith County
- Coordinates: 39.965981°N 98.793109°W
- Country: United States
- State: Kansas
- County: Smith
- Established: 1875

Government
  - Trustee: Curtis Overmiller

Area
  - Total: 36.01 sq mi (93.3 km^{2})
  - Land: 35.863 sq mi (92.88 km^{2})
  - Water: 0.147 sq mi (0.38 km^{2}) 0.41%

Population (2020)
  - Total: 51
  - Density: 1.4/sq mi (0.55/km^{2})
- Time zone: UTC-6 (CST)
  - Summer (DST): UTC-5 (CDT)
- Area code: 785
- GNIS feature ID: 471825

Beaver Township is a township in Smith County, Kansas, United States. As of the 2020 census, its population was 51.

== History ==
Beaver Township was established in 1875 as one of the original nine townships of Smith County. It lost parts of its land to create other townships: Martin Township, Pleasant Township, Washington Township, and Cora Township. Modern Pawnee Township was moved to land that is also formerly part of Beaver Township.

== Geography ==
Beaver Township covers an area of 36.01 square miles (93.3 square kilometers).

=== Communities ===
- Thornburg

=== Adjacent townships ===
Washington Township, Franklin County, Nebraska
		north
Martin Township, Smith County	west	self	east	Pawnee Township, Smith County
Pleasant Township, Smith County	southwest	south	southeast	Cora Township, Smith County
Washington Township, Smith County

== Demographics ==
As of the 2020 census, there were 51 people and 15 households residing in the township. The population density was 1.4 people per square mile (0.54 people/km^{2}). There were 32 housing units. The racial makeup of the township was 100% White. Hispanics or Latinos of any race were 0.0% of the population.

There were 15 households: 66.7% were married couples living together, and 33.3% had a female householder with no spouse present. The average family size was 1.80 people. 21.7% of people in the township older than 24 had a college degree, and the township had an employment rate of 100%.
