= Albert Wagner (veteran) =

- Born: September 5, 1899; North Lincoln County, Kansas, US
- Died: January 20, 2007 (aged 107); Smith Center, Kansas, US
- Spouse: Lillie
- Children: 4
- Military career
- Allegiance: United States
- Branch: Marines
- Unit: USMC AEF 2nd Army Division 6th Marine Regiment
- Conflicts: World War I

Albert Frederick 'Jud' Wagner (September 5, 1899 - January 20, 2007) was, at age 107, the last surviving Marine veteran from America to serve during the First World War.

USMC AEF 2nd Army Division 6th Marine Regiment

== Biography ==
Albert Frederick "Jud" Wagner was born in North Lincoln County, Kansas on September 5, 1899. In 1905 the family moved to Harlan, Kansas after losing their father. In 1916, at age 17, he joined the United States Marine Corps. After completing boot camp, Wagner was shipped to France in October 1918. He served in the Army of Occupation after the armistice. After the war, Wagner stayed in the Marine Corps until he was discharged in 1919. After his discharge, Wagner returned to Smith County. In October 2002, he received the French Legion of Honour. He was also honored with 30 miles of U.S. Highway 36 through Smith County, which was dedicated as World War I Veterans Highway.

Wagner and his wife Lillie managed the Smith County Poor Farm from 1930 to 1957. They had four children. They moved to town in 1957 and purchased one of the Lustron homes in Smith Center from the Martyn family. Wagner died in Smith Center, Kansas on January 20, 2007, at age 107. His funeral took place five days later on January 25, 2007.
