= Pawnee Township, Smith County, Kansas =

Township in Smith County, Kansas, U.S.

Pawnee Township
- Township
- Location within Smith County
- Coordinates: 39.951818°N 98.663612°W
- Country: United States
- State: Kansas
- County: Smith
- Established: 1875

Government
  - Trustee: Dustin McCleary

Area
  - Total: 35.768 sq mi (92.64 km^{2})
  - Land: 35.575 sq mi (92.14 km^{2})
  - Water: 0.193 sq mi (0.50 km^{2}) 0.54%

Population (2020)
  - Total: 36
  - Density: 1.0/sq mi (0.39/km^{2})
- Time zone: UTC-6 (CST)
  - Summer (DST): UTC-5 (CDT)
- Area code: 785
- GNIS feature ID: 471827

Pawnee Township is a township in Smith County, Kansas, United States. As of the 2020 census, its population was 36.

== History ==
Pawnee Township was established in 1875 as one of the original nine townships of Smith County. The first permanent settler in what would become Pawnee Township was B. F. Myers, who settled there in 1870. It lost parts of its land to create other townships: White Rock Township, Cora Township, and Logan Township. Modern Pawnee Township was also made from part of what used to be Beaver Township.

== Geography ==
Pawnee Township covers an area of 35.768 square miles (92.64 square kilometers).

=== Communities ===
- Womer

=== Adjacent townships ===
Webster County, Nebraska
Washington Township, Franklin County, Nebraska	northwest	north
Beaver Township, Smith County	west	self	east	Logan Township, Smith County
Washington Township, Smith County	southwest	south	southeast	White Rock Township, Smith County
Cora Township, Smith County

== Demographics ==
As of the 2020 census, there were 36 people residing in the township. The population density was 1.0 people per square mile (0.39 people/km^{2}). The racial makeup of the township was 100% White. Hispanics or Latinos of any race were 0.0% of the population.
