= Ray Boggs =

American baseball player (1904-1989)

- Pitcher
- Born: December 12, 1904; Reamsville, Kansas
- Died: November 27, 1989 (aged 84); Grand Junction, Colorado
- Batted: Left Threw: Left

MLB debut
- September 1, 1928, for the Boston Braves

Last MLB appearance
- September 17, 1928, for the Boston Braves

MLB statistics
- Games: 4
- Innings Pitched: 5
- ERA: 5.40
- Stats at Baseball Reference

Teams
- Boston Braves (1928)

Ray Boggs (December 12, 1904 in Reamsville, Kansas – November 27, 1989 in Grand Junction, Colorado), nicknamed "Lefty", was a pitcher for the 1928 Boston Braves.

Boggs was a left-handed pitcher and batter. He was 6 ft 0 in (1.83 m) and weighed 170 lb. He attended the University of Denver. He played a total of four games in his entire career.
