= Hardilee, Kansas =

- Ghost town
- Location within the state of Kansas Hardilee (the United States)
- Coordinates: 39°52′49″N 98°59′38″W
- Country: United States
- State: Kansas
- County: Smith
- Township: Swan
- Elevation: 1,978 ft (603 m)

Population
  - Total: 0
- Time zone: UTC-6 (CST)
  - Summer (DST): UTC-5 (CDT)
- ZIP Code: 785
- GNIS ID: 482604

Hardilee is a ghost town in Swan Township, Smith County, Kansas, United States.

== History ==
Hardilee was issued a post office in August 1882. Isaac N. Deppen was the first postmaster. The post office was discontinued in 1901.

The origin of the name is unclear. However, writer Stanley Hunter published a popular series of syndicated stories called the "Spoopendyke" papers in the 1880s, and a story first printed around May 1882 includes the line "I believe I'll call you Hardilee hereafter." The story reference is playing off a boat captain's command of "Hard alee". The story is the only newspaper mentions of "Hardilee" until the post office was named in August 1882.

The community had a schoolhouse.

The 1912 Cyclopedia of Kansas History describes Hardilee as an "inland hamlet" 13 miles northwest of Smith Center and eight miles north of Kensington, which is also noted to be the closest railroad station, and the post office distributing mail by rural delivery to the area.
