= Cora, Kansas =

- Ghost town
- Location within the state of Kansas Cora (the United States)
- Coordinates: 39°53′34″N 98°39′49″W
- Country: United States
- State: Kansas
- County: Smith
- Elevation: 1,968 ft (600 m)

Population
  - Total: 0
- Time zone: UTC-6 (CST)
  - Summer (DST): UTC-5 (CDT)
- ZIP Code: 785
- GNIS ID: 484586

Cora is a ghost town in Smith County, Kansas, United States.

== History ==
A small village settled in the early 1870s, in 1883 Cora was reported as having one store, a blacksmith and wainwright, a schoolhouse, and a Congregationalist church. A post office operated from 1871 to 1904. Cora suffered from depopulation in the mid-20th-century and by 1981 only one inhabited house remained. Today, a car scrapyard occupies part of the former town site.
