= K-8 (Kansas highway) =

State highway in Kansas, U.S.

K-8
- Southern segment highlighted in red, northern segment highlighted in blue

Route information
- Maintained by KDOT
- Length: 17.254 mi (27.768 km)

Southern segment
- Length: 1.275 mi (2.052 km)
- South end: SH-8 near Kiowa
- North end: K-2 in Kiowa

Northern segment
- Length: 15.979 mi (25.716 km)
- South end: US-36 near Athol
- North end: N-10 near Franklin

Location
- Country: United States
- State: Kansas
- Counties: North: Smith South: Barber

Highway system
- Kansas State Highway System; Interstate; US; State; Spurs
← K-7	→ K-9

K-8 is the name of two separate state highways in Kansas, United States. The southern highway is a 1.275-mile-long (2.052 km) road, linking Oklahoma State Highway 8 (SH-8) to the town of Kiowa. The northern highway is a 15.979-mile-long (25.716 km) road, linking U.S. Route 36 (US-36) near Athol to Nebraska Highway 10 (N-10) near the town of Franklin.

== Route description ==
=== Southern highway ===
Classified as a major collector road, the southern K-8 is a continuation of SH-8, linking northern Oklahoma to the town of Kiowa. Approximately halfway between the state line and the northern terminus, the highway crosses a single track originally belonging to the Atchison, Topeka and Santa Fe Railway, which is now part of BNSF Railway's Kansas Division.

=== Northern highway ===
The northern K-8, also classified as a major collector road, begins at an intersection with US-36 near Athol, traveling north through rural farmland in northern Smith County. The highway terminates at the Nebraska state line, where the roadway continues as N-10.

== History ==
K-8 was constructed between 1918 and 1932, traveling south-north through the middle of the state. By 1940, the highways were truncated to their current segments. US-281 has replaced the former statewide K-8 as the primary link between Oklahoma and Nebraska. The northern section was renumbered as K-11. In 1959, K-11 was transferred back to K-8, and K-8 was on its current route.

== Major intersections ==
=== Southern highway ===
The entire route is in Barber County.

Location	mi	km	Destinations	Notes
	0.000	0.000	SH-8 south – Burlington	Continuation into Oklahoma
Kiowa	1.275	2.052	K-2 (Main Street) – Hardtner, Hazelton	Northern terminus of southern section
1.000 mi = 1.609 km; 1.000 km = 0.621 mi

=== Northern highway ===
The entire route is in Smith County.

Location	mi	km	Destinations	Notes
	0.000	0.000	US-36 – Smith Center, Phillipsburg	Southern terminus of northern section
	15.979	25.716	N-10 north – Franklin	Continuation into Nebraska
1.000 mi = 1.609 km; 1.000 km = 0.621 mi
