= Washington Township, Smith County, Kansas =

Township in Smith County, Kansas, U.S.

Washington Township
- Township
- Location within Smith County
- Coordinates: 39.871962°N 98.785659°W
- Country: United States
- State: Kansas
- County: Smith

Government
  - Trustee: Melanie Bartley

Area
  - Total: 35.878 sq mi (92.92 km^{2})
  - Land: 35.878 sq mi (92.92 km^{2})
  - Water: 0 sq mi (0 km^{2}) 0%

Population (2020)
  - Total: 61
  - Density: 1.7/sq mi (0.66/km^{2})
- Time zone: UTC-6 (CST)
  - Summer (DST): UTC-5 (CDT)
- Area code: 785
- GNIS feature ID: 471826

Washington Township is a township in Smith County, Kansas, United States. As of the 2020 census, its population was 61.

== History ==
Washington Township was created from Beaver Township and Center Township.

== Geography ==
Washington Township covers an area of 35.878 square miles (92.92 square kilometers).

=== Adjacent townships ===
Beaver Township, Smith County
Martin Township, Smith County	northwest	north	northeast	Pawnee Township, Smith County
Pleasant Township, Smith County	west	self	east	Cora Township, Smith County
Lane Township, Smith County	southwest	south	southeast	Blaine Township, Smith County
Center Township, Smith County

== Demographics ==
As of the 2020 census, there were 61 people residing in the township. The population density was 1.7 people per square mile (0.66 people/km^{2}). The racial makeup of the township was 90.2% White, 1.6% Asian, 4.9% from some other race, and 3.3% from two or more races. Hispanics or Latinos of any race were 4.9% of the population.
