= Dispatch, Kansas =

Unincorporated community in Smith County, Kansas

Coordinates: 39°35′47″N 98°30′18″W

Dispatch is an unincorporated community in Smith County, Kansas, United States.

== History ==
A post office was opened in Dispatch in 1891, and remained in operation until it was discontinued in 1904. Dispatch was named after its role in shipping the mail.
