= White Rock Township, Smith County, Kansas =

Township in Smith County, Kansas, U.S.

White Rock Township
- Township
- Location within Smith County
- Coordinates: 39.864576°N 98.555832°W
- Country: United States
- State: Kansas
- County: Smith

Government
  - Trustee: Robert Dean

Area
  - Total: 35.875 sq mi (92.92 km^{2})
  - Land: 35.772 sq mi (92.65 km^{2})
  - Water: 0.103 sq mi (0.27 km^{2}) 0.29%

Population (2020)
  - Total: 37
  - Density: 1.0/sq mi (0.40/km^{2})
- Time zone: UTC-6 (CST)
  - Summer (DST): UTC-5 (CDT)
- Area code: 785
- GNIS feature ID: 471967

White Rock Township is a township in Smith County, Kansas, United States. As of the 2020 census, its population was 37.

== History ==
White Rock Township was created from parts of Pawnee Township and Oak Township.

== Geography ==
White Rock Township covers an area of 35.875 square miles (92.92 square kilometers). White Rock Creek flows through it. White Rock Township is famous for being the location of the geographic center of the contiguous United States, located in the southern part of the township.

=== Adjacent townships ===
Logan Township, Smith County
Pawnee Township, Smith County	northwest	north	northeast	Highland Township, Jewell County
Cora Township, Smith County	west	self	east	White Mound Township, Jewell County
Blaine Township, Smith County	southwest	south	southeast	Esbon Township, Jewell County
Oak Township, Smith County

== Transportation ==
=== Major highways ===
- US-281

== Demographics ==
As of the 2020 census, there were 37 people and 7 households residing in the township. The population density was 6.50 people per square mile (2.51 people/km^{2}). There were 7 housing units. The racial makeup of the township was 91.9% White, 2.7% Black or African American, and 5.4% from two or more races. Hispanics or Latinos of any race were 5.4% of the population.

There were 7 households: 100% were married couples living together. The average family size was 1.86 people. 100% of people in the township older than 24 had a college degree, and the township had an employment rate of 100%.
