= Jacksonburg, Kansas =

- Ghost town
- Location within the state of Kansas Jacksonburg (the United States)
- Coordinates: 39°54′30″N 98°53′46″W
- Country: United States
- State: Kansas
- County: Smith
- Elevation: 1,827 ft (557 m)

Population
  - Total: 0
- Time zone: UTC-6 (CST)
  - Summer (DST): UTC-5 (CDT)
- ZIP Code: 785
- GNIS ID: 481911

Jacksonburg is a ghost town in Smith County, Kansas, United States.

== History ==
Jacksonburg was issued a post office in 1884. The post office was discontinued in 1899.
