= Germantown, Kansas =

- Ghost town
- Location within the state of Kansas Germantown (the United States)
- Coordinates: 39°49′45″N 99°02′58″W
- Country: United States
- State: Kansas
- County: Smith
- Elevation: 1,850 ft (560 m)

Population
  - Total: 0
- Time zone: UTC-6 (CST)
  - Summer (DST): UTC-5 (CDT)
- ZIP Code: 785
- GNIS ID: 482605

Germantown is a ghost town in Smith County, Kansas, United States. The town is deserted, and currently only a cemetery remains.

== History ==
Settled in 1872 by German immigrants, the town failed to thrive and was abandoned by 1885. The post office, founded a year before the town, remained in operation until 1893.
