= Cora Township, Kansas =

Township in Smith County, Kansas, U.S.

Cora Township
- Township
- Location within Smith County
- Coordinates: 39.879115°N 98.668387°W
- Country: United States
- State: Kansas
- County: Smith

Government
  - Trustee: Jay Overmiller

Area
  - Total: 35.957 sq mi (93.13 km^{2})
  - Land: 35.881 sq mi (92.93 km^{2})
  - Water: 0.076 sq mi (0.20 km^{2}) 0.21%

Population (2020)
  - Total: 21
  - Density: 0.59/sq mi (0.23/km^{2})
- Time zone: UTC-6 (CST)
  - Summer (DST): UTC-5 (CDT)
- Area code: 785
- GNIS feature ID: 471828

Cora Township is a township in Smith County, Kansas, United States. As of the 2020 census, its population was 21.

== History ==
Cora Township was created from parts of Beaver Township, Pawnee Township, Oak Township, and Center Township.

== Geography ==
Cora Township covers an area of 35.935 square miles (93.13 square kilometers).

=== Adjacent townships ===
Pawnee Township, Smith County
Beaver Township, Smith County	northwest	north	northeast	Logan Township, Smith County
Washington Township, Smith County	west	self	east	White Rock Township, Smith County
Center Township, Smith County	southwest	south	southeast	Oak Township, Smith County
Blaine Township, Smith County

== Demographics ==
As of the 2020 census, there were 21 people and 6 households residing in the township. The population density was 0.59 people per square mile (0.23 people/km^{2}). There were 6 housing units. The racial makeup of the township was 100% White. Hispanics or Latinos of any race were 0.0% of the population.

There were 6 households: 100% were married couples living together. The average family size was 2.17 people. 100% of people in the township older than 24 had a college degree, and the township had an employment rate of 100%.
