= Bellaire, Smith County, Kansas =

Unincorporated community in Smith County, Kansas

Coordinates: 39°47′54″N 98°40′34″W

Bellaire is an unincorporated community in Smith County, Kansas, United States. It was named after Bellaire, Ohio.

== History ==
A post office was opened in Bellaire in 1888, and remained in operation until it was discontinued in 1980.

According to a 1912 encyclopedia of Kansas, Bellaire was once a thriving town with a bank, post office, two churches and a reported population of 200.

== Geography ==
Its elevation is 1,873 feet and its location is Latitude 39.7983453, Longitude -98.6761812.
