= Cedar Township, Smith County, Kansas =

Township in Smith County, Kansas, U.S.

Cedar Township
- Township
- Location within Smith County
- Coordinates: 39.792424°N 99.010434°W
- Country: United States
- State: Kansas
- County: Smith
- Established: 1875

Government
  - Trustee: Jamie Reneberg

Area
  - Total: 35.935 sq mi (93.07 km^{2})
  - Land: 35.903 sq mi (92.99 km^{2})
  - Water: 0.032 sq mi (0.083 km^{2}) 0.09%

Population (2020)
  - Total: 484
  - Density: 13.5/sq mi (5.20/km^{2})
- Time zone: UTC-6 (CST)
  - Summer (DST): UTC-5 (CDT)
- Area code: 785
- GNIS feature ID: 471943

Cedar Township is a township in Smith County, Kansas, United States. As of the 2020 census, its population was 484.

== History ==
Cedar Township was established in 1875 as one of the original nine townships of Smith County. It lost parts of its land to create other townships: Swan Township, Pleasant Township, Lane Township and Valley Township. Modern Harvey Township was moved to land that was partially in Cedar Township as well.

== Geography ==
Cedar Township covers an area of 35.935 square miles (93.07 square kilometers).

=== Communities ===
- Kensington

=== Adjacent townships ===
Swan Township, Smith County
Crystal Township, Phillips County	northwest	north	northeast	Pleasant Township, Smith County
Plum Township, Phillips County	west	self	east	Lane Township, Smith County
Kirwin Township, Phillips County	southwest	south	southeast	Harvey Township, Smith County
Valley Township, Smith County

== Transportation ==
=== Major highways ===
- US-36

== Demographics ==
As of the 2020 census, there were 484 people and 318 households residing in the township. The population density was 13.5 people per square mile (5.2 people/km^{2}). There were 379 housing units. The racial makeup of the township was 94.8% White, 0.6% Black or African American, 0.4% Native American, 0.2% Asian, 0.2% Pacific Islander, 0.2% from some other race, and 3.5% from two or more races. Hispanics or Latinos of any race were 1.0% of the population.

There were 318 households: 52.5% were married couples living together, 29.6% had a female householder with no spouse present, and 17.0% had a male householder with no spouse present. The average family size was 2.90 people. 38.8% of people in the township older than 24 had a college degree, and the township had an employment rate of 57.8%.
