= Claudell, Kansas =

Unincorporated community in Kansas, U.S.

Coordinates: 39°39′45″N 99°01′45″W

Claudell is an unincorporated community in Valley Township, Smith County, Kansas, United States.

== History ==
Claudell was a station on the Missouri Pacific Railroad.

A post office was opened in Claudell in 1898, and remained in operation until it was discontinued in 1957.
