= Webster Township, Smith County, Kansas =

Township in Smith County, Kansas, U.S.

Webster Township
- Township
- Location within Smith County
- Coordinates: 39.705378°N 98.568972°W
- Country: United States
- State: Kansas
- County: Smith

Government
  - Trustee: Marion Schlatter

Area
  - Total: 35.818 sq mi (92.77 km^{2})
  - Land: 35.811 sq mi (92.75 km^{2})
  - Water: 0.007 sq mi (0.018 km^{2}) 0.02%

Population (2020)
  - Total: 47
  - Density: 1.3/sq mi (0.51/km^{2})
- Time zone: UTC-6 (CST)
  - Summer (DST): UTC-5 (CDT)
- Area code: 785
- GNIS feature ID: 472081

Webster Township is a township in Smith County, Kansas, United States. As of the 2020 census, its population was 47.

== History ==
Webster Township was created from parts of Lincoln Township and Oak Township.

== Geography ==
Webster Township covers an area of 35.818 square miles (92.77 square kilometers). Oak Creek flows through it.

=== Adjacent townships ===
Oak Township, Smith County
Blaine Township, Smith County	northwest	north	northeast	Esbon Township, Jewell County
Crystal Plains Township, Smith County	west	self	east	Odesssa Township, Jewell County
Garfield Township, Smith County	southwest	south	southeast	Erving Township, Jewell County
Lincoln Township, Smith County

== Transportation ==
=== Major highways ===
- K-181

== Demographics ==
As of the 2020 census, there were 47 people and 22 households residing in the township. The population density was 1.3 people per square mile (0.50 people/km^{2}). There were 39 housing units. The racial makeup of the township was 97.9% White, and 2.1% from some other race. Hispanics or Latinos of any race were 2.1% of the population.

There were 22 households: 100% had a male householder with no spouse present. 0.0% of people in the township older than 24 had a college degree, and the township had an employment rate of 22.7%.
