= Womer, Kansas =

Unincorporated community in Smith County, Kansas

Coordinates: 39°58′25″N 98°42′38″W

Womer is an unincorporated community in Smith County, Kansas, United States.

== History ==
A post office was opened in Womer in 1883, and remained in operation until it was discontinued in 1905.
