= Crystal Plains Township, Kansas =

Township in Smith County, Kansas, U.S.

Crystal Plains Township
- Township
- Location within Smith County
- Coordinates: 39.69115°N 98.680737°W
- Country: United States
- State: Kansas
- County: Smith

Government
  - Trustee: Ava Lee Maydew

Area
  - Total: 35.918 sq mi (93.03 km^{2})
  - Land: 35.9 sq mi (93 km^{2})
  - Water: 0.018 sq mi (0.047 km^{2}) 0.05%

Population (2020)
  - Total: 20
  - Density: 0.56/sq mi (0.22/km^{2})
- Time zone: UTC-6 (CST)
  - Summer (DST): UTC-5 (CDT)
- Area code: 785
- GNIS feature ID: 472073

Crystal Plains Township is a township in Smith County, Kansas, United States. As of the 2020 census, its population was 20.

== History ==
Crystal Plains Township was created from parts of Houston Township, Lincoln Township, Oak Township, and Center Township.

== Geography ==
Crystal Plains Township covers an area of 35.918 square miles (93.03 square kilometers).

=== Adjacent townships ===
Blaine Township, Smith County
Center Township, Smith County	northwest	north	northeast	Oak Township, Smith County
Banner Township, Smith County	west	self	east	Webster Township, Smith County
Harlan Township, Smith County	southwest	south	southeast	Lincoln Township, Smith County
Garfield Township, Smith County

== Demographics ==
As of the 2020 census, there were 20 people and 18 households residing in the township. The population density was 0.56 people per square mile (0.22 people/km^{2}). There were 18 housing units. The racial makeup of the township was 100% White. Hispanics or Latinos of any race were 0.0% of the population.

There were 18 households: 0.0% were married couples living together, 94.4% had a male householder with no spouse present, and 5.6% had a female householder with no spouse present. 0.0% of people in the township older than 24 had a college degree, and the township had an employment rate of 0.0%.
