= Thornburg, Kansas =

Unincorporated community in Smith County, Kansas

Coordinates: 39°56′40″N 98°47′10″W

Thornburg is an unincorporated community in Smith County, Kansas, United States.

== History ==
Thornburg briefly had a post office, from 1902 until 1904. Thornburg School, a one-room schoolhouse, was built in 1880 and remained in use until its closing in 1963. The original structure still stands.
