= German Township, Kansas =

Township in Smith County, Kansas, U.S.

German Township
- Township
- Location within Smith County
- Coordinates: 39.946894°N 99.013334°W
- Country: United States
- State: Kansas
- County: Smith
- Established: 1875

Government
  - Trustee: Kyle Mankhey

Area
  - Total: 35.602 sq mi (92.21 km^{2})
  - Land: 35.434 sq mi (91.77 km^{2})
  - Water: 0.168 sq mi (0.44 km^{2}) 0.47%

Population (2020)
  - Total: 19
  - Density: 0.54/sq mi (0.21/km^{2})
- Time zone: UTC-6 (CST)
  - Summer (DST): UTC-5 (CDT)
- Area code: 785
- GNIS feature ID: 471795

German Township is a township in Smith County, Kansas, United States. As of the 2020 census, its population was 19.

== History ==
German Township was established in 1875 as one of the original nine townships of Smith County. The first settlers in what would become German Township was H. H. Granholz, H. Menshoff, L. Bierman, J. Rider and A. Eldredge, who settled there in January 1871. The first school built in German Township was built in August 1873. The first church was built in February 1876 by the Church of the United Brethren in Christ. It lost parts of its land to create other townships: Swan Township, Pleasant Township, and Martin Township.

== Geography ==
German Township covers an area of 35.602 square miles (92.21 square kilometers).

=== Adjacent townships ===
East Bloomington Township, Franklin County, Nebraska
Turkey Creek Township, Franklin County, Nebraska	northwest	north
Sumner Township, Phillips County	west	self	east	Martin Township, Smith County
Crystal Township, Phillips County	southwest	south	southeast	Pleasant Township, Smith County
Swan Township, Smith County

== Demographics ==
As of the 2020 census, there were 19 people and 2 households residing in the township. The population density was 0.54 people per square mile (0.21 people/km^{2}). There were 5 housing units. The racial makeup of the township was 100% White. Hispanics or Latinos of any race were 0.0% of the population.

There were 2 households: 100% were married couples living together. The average family size was 3.50 people. 0.0% of people in the township older than 24 had a college degree, and the township had an employment rate of 50.0%.
