= Home on the Range Cabin =

Historic house in Kansas, United States

- U.S. National Register of Historic Places
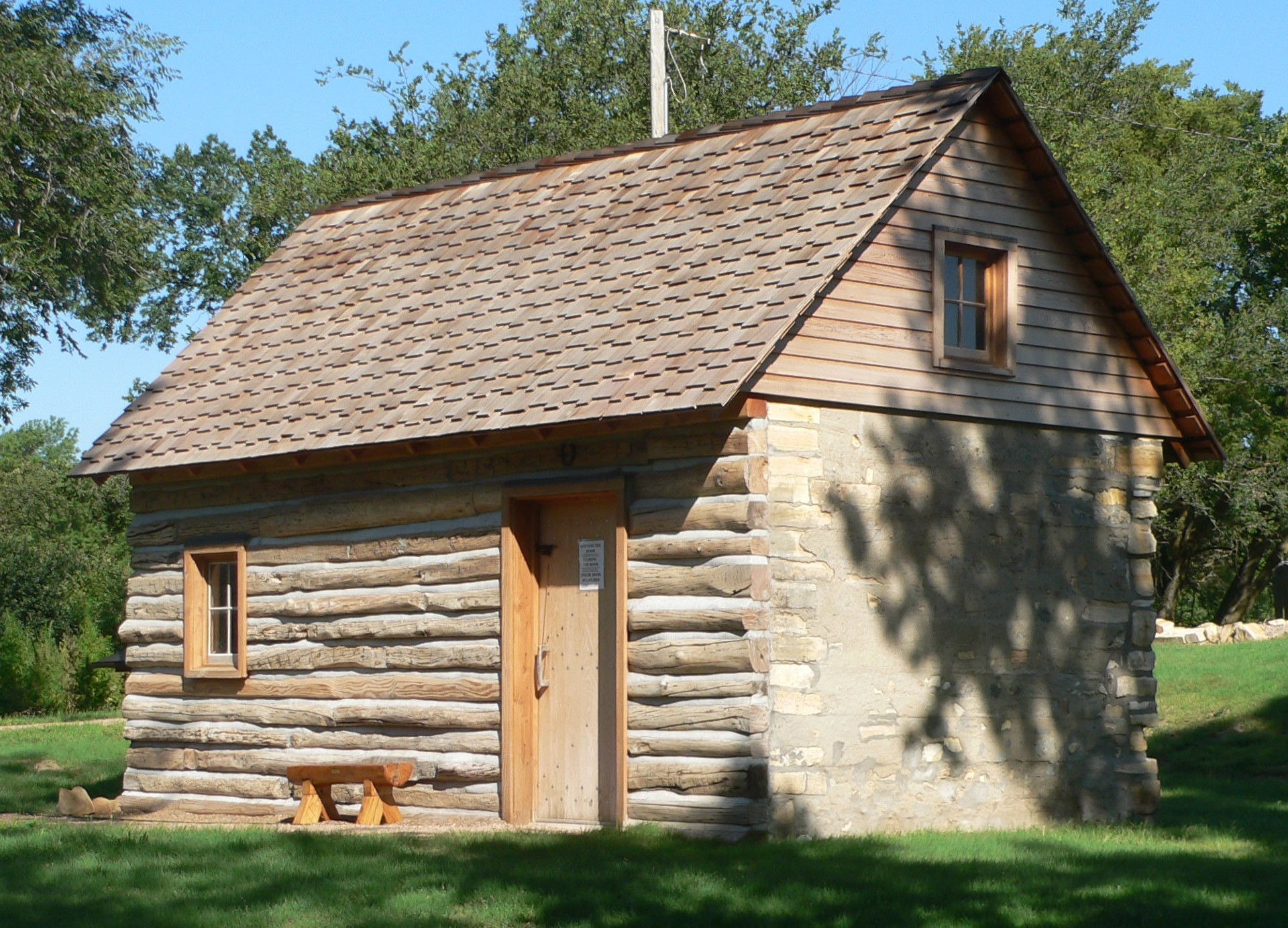

- Location within Kansas Location within the United States
- Nearest city: Smith Center, Kansas
- Coordinates: 39°53′21.8″N 98°56′49.8″W
- Area: 1 acre (0.40 ha)
- Built: 1875
- Built by: Higley VI, Dr. Brewster
- Architectural style: Log Cabin
- NRHP reference No.: 73000780
- Added to NRHP: March 26, 1973

The Home on the Range Cabin, near Smith Center, Kansas, is a log cabin built by Dr. Brewster Higley VI in 1875. It is associated with the song "Home on the Range", written by Higley as a poem in 1872 while living on a dugout that he built in the banks of the Beaver Creek. Higley's friend Dan Kelley set the poem to music; the song eventually became famous and is now the state song of Kansas.

The property was listed on the National Register of Historic Places in 1973.

The cabin site is 240 acres of range and cultivated land owned by Peoples Heartland Foundation. The cabin was restored in 2013 to its 1870s appearance.
