= Harlan, Kansas =

Unincorporated community in Smith County, Kansas

- Unincorporated community
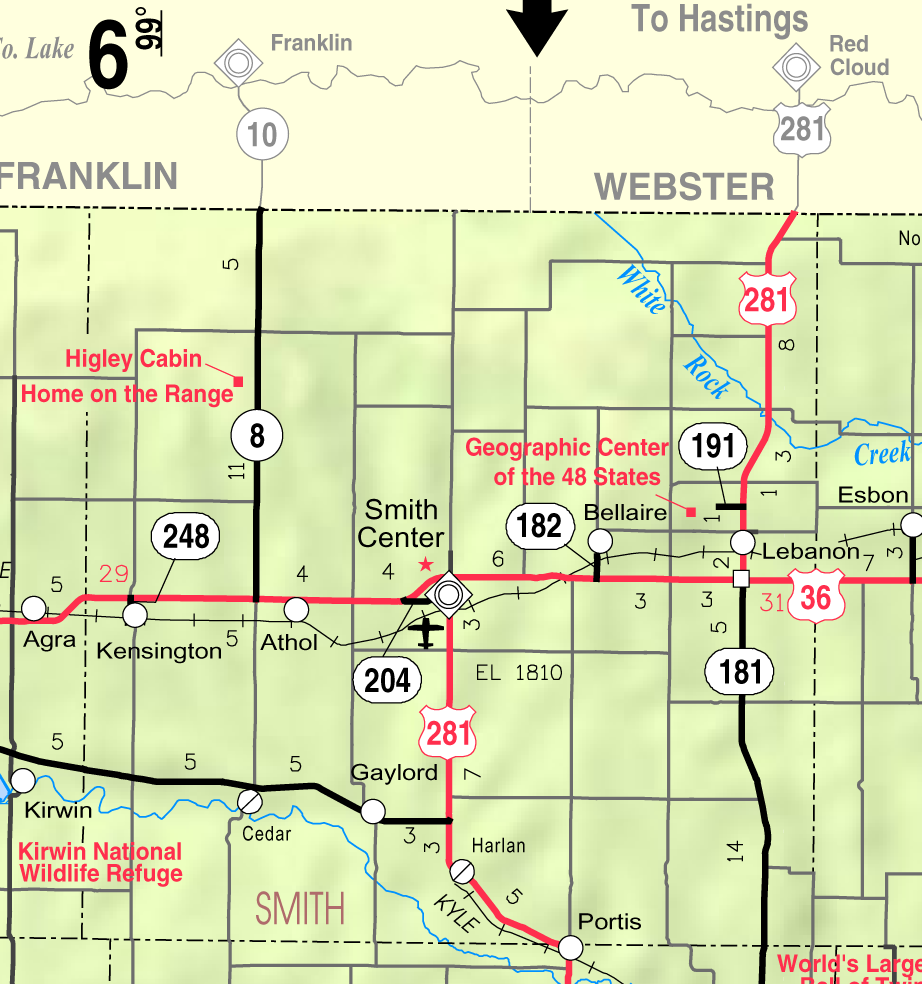
- KDOT map of Smith County (legend)

- Location within Kansas Location within the United States
- Coordinates: 39°36′20″N 98°46′1″W
- Country: United States
- State: Kansas
- County: Smith
- Named for: John Harlan
- Elevation: 1,585 ft (483 m)
- Time zone: UTC-6 (CST)
  - Summer (DST): UTC-5 (CDT)
- Area code: 785
- FIPS code: 20-30075
- GNIS ID: 472153

Harlan is an unincorporated community in Smith County, Kansas, United States.

== History ==
Harlan was named for John C. Harlan, a pioneer settler.

A post office was opened in Harlan in the 1870s, and remained in operation until it was discontinued in 1995.

== Education ==
Harlan is served by Smith Center USD 237 public school district.

Harlan High School was closed through school unification. The Harlan High School mascot was Cardinals.
