= Gaylord, Kansas =

City in Smith County, Kansas

- City
- Location within Smith County and Kansas

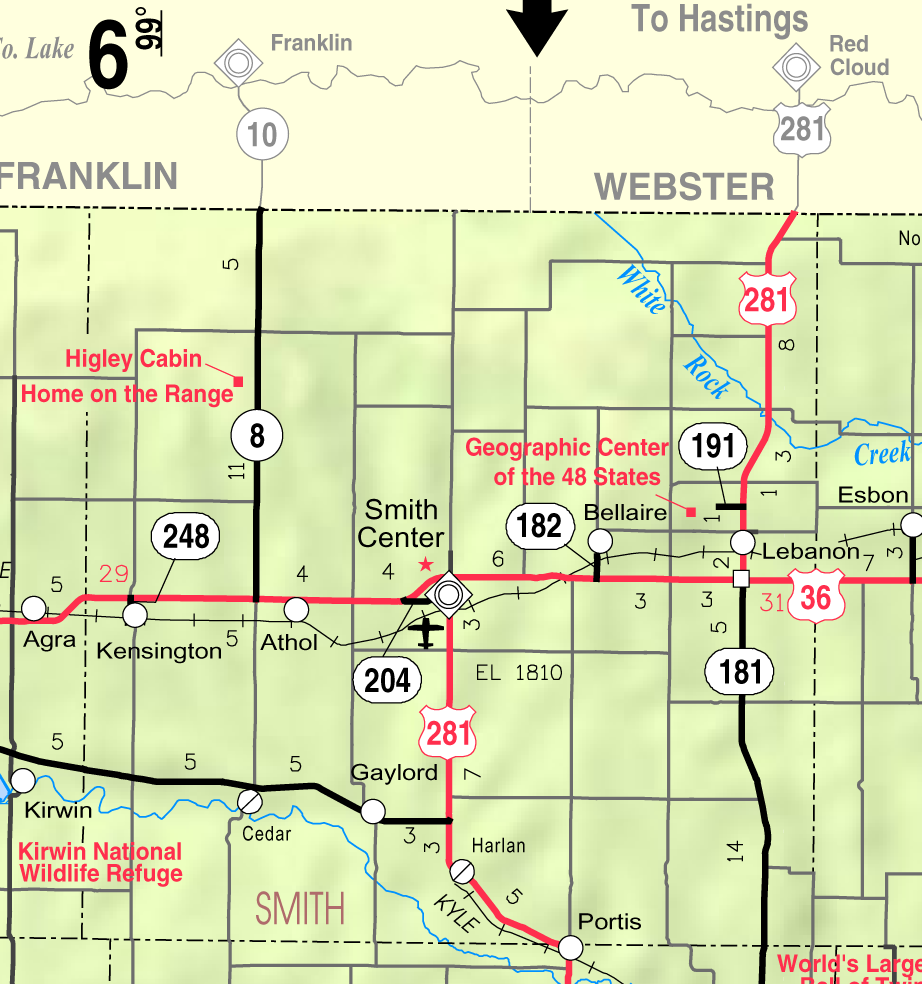
- KDOT map of Smith County (legend)
- Coordinates: 39°38′47″N 98°50′50″W
- Country: United States
- State: Kansas
- County: Smith
- Founded: 1870
- Incorporated: 1886
- Named for: C.E. Gaylord

Government
  - Type: Mayor–Council

Area
  - Total: 0.25 sq mi (0.66 km^{2})
  - Land: 0.25 sq mi (0.66 km^{2})
  - Water: 0 sq mi (0.00 km^{2})
- Elevation: 1,595 ft (486 m)

Population (2020)
  - Total: 87
  - Density: 340/sq mi (130/km^{2})
- Time zone: UTC-6 (CST)
  - Summer (DST): UTC-5 (CDT)
- ZIP Code: 67638
- Area code: 785
- FIPS code: 20-26000
- GNIS ID: 2394869
- Website: gaylordkansas.com

Gaylord is a city in Smith County, Kansas, United States. As of the 2020 census, the population of the city was 87.

== History ==
Gaylord was founded in 1870. It was named for C. E. Gaylord, a native of Marshall County, who was one of the town's founders. The Gaylord post office opened in June 1871.

Gaylord was a station on the Missouri Pacific Railroad.

== Geography ==
According to the United States Census Bureau, the city has a total area of 0.25 square miles (0.65 km^{2}), all land.

== Demographics ==
Historical population
| Census | Pop. | Note | %± |
|---|---|---|---|
| 1880 | 231 | | — |
| 1890 | 314 | | 35.9% |
| 1900 | 302 | | −3.8% |
| 1910 | 308 | | 2.0% |
| 1920 | 356 | | 15.6% |
| 1930 | 291 | | −18.3% |
| 1940 | 245 | | −15.8% |
| 1950 | 231 | | −5.7% |
| 1960 | 239 | | 3.5% |
| 1970 | 211 | | −11.7% |
| 1980 | 203 | | −3.8% |
| 1990 | 173 | | −14.8% |
| 2000 | 145 | | −16.2% |
| 2010 | 114 | | −21.4% |
| 2020 | 87 | | −23.7% |
U.S. Decennial Census

=== 2020 census ===
The 2020 United States census counted 87 people, 44 households, and 25 families in Gaylord. The population density was 341.2 per square mile (131.7/km^{2}). There were 67 housing units at an average density of 262.7 per square mile (101.4/km^{2}). The racial makeup was 94.25% (82) white or European American (94.25% non-Hispanic white), 2.3% (2) black or African-American, 0.0% (0) Native American or Alaska Native, 0.0% (0) Asian, 0.0% (0) Pacific Islander or Native Hawaiian, 2.3% (2) from other races, and 1.15% (1) from two or more races. Hispanic or Latino of any race was 2.3% (2) of the population.

Of the 44 households, 13.6% had children under the age of 18; 47.7% were married couples living together; 15.9% had a female householder with no spouse or partner present. 43.2% of households consisted of individuals and 15.9% had someone living alone who was 65 years of age or older. The average household size was 1.9 and the average family size was 2.3. The percent of those with a bachelor's degree or higher was estimated to be 33.3% of the population.

14.9% of the population was under the age of 18, 5.7% from 18 to 24, 16.1% from 25 to 44, 37.9% from 45 to 64, and 25.3% who were 65 years of age or older. The median age was 58.1 years. For every 100 females, there were 89.1 males. For every 100 females ages 18 and older, there were 94.7 males.

The 2016–2020 5-year American Community Survey estimates show that the median household income was $34,531 (with a margin of error of +/- $23,122) and the median family income was $43,500 (+/- $40,915). Males had a median income of $43,750 (+/- $42,615) versus $15,139 (+/- $4,905) for females. The median income for those above 16 years old was $25,417 (+/- $19,082). Approximately, 25.0% of families and 34.5% of the population were below the poverty line, including 68.0% of those under the age of 18 and 6.8% of those ages 65 or over.

=== 2010 census ===
As of the census of 2010, there were 114 people, 59 households, and 32 families living in the city. The population density was 456.0 inhabitants per square mile (176.1/km^{2}). There were 91 housing units at an average density of 364.0 per square mile (140.5/km^{2}). The racial makeup of the city was 95.6% White, 0.9% African American, 0.9% Native American, and 2.6% from two or more races.

There were 59 households, of which 18.6% had children under the age of 18 living with them, 44.1% were married couples living together, 3.4% had a female householder with no husband present, 6.8% had a male householder with no wife present, and 45.8% were non-families. 42.4% of all households were made up of individuals, and 23.8% had someone living alone who was 65 years of age or older. The average household size was 1.93 and the average family size was 2.59.

The median age in the city was 52.3 years. 19.3% of residents were under the age of 18; 5.3% were between the ages of 18 and 24; 16.6% were from 25 to 44; 29.7% were from 45 to 64; and 28.9% were 65 years of age or older. The gender makeup of the city was 50.0% male and 50.0% female.

== Government ==
The Gaylord government consists of a mayor and five council members. The council meets the 2nd Wednesday of each month at 7:30PM.

- City Hall, 509 Main Street.

== Education ==
Gaylord is served by USD 237 Smith Center Schools.

Gaylord schools were closed through school unification. The Gaylord High School mascot was Beavers.
