= Athol, Kansas =

City in Smith County, Kansas

- City
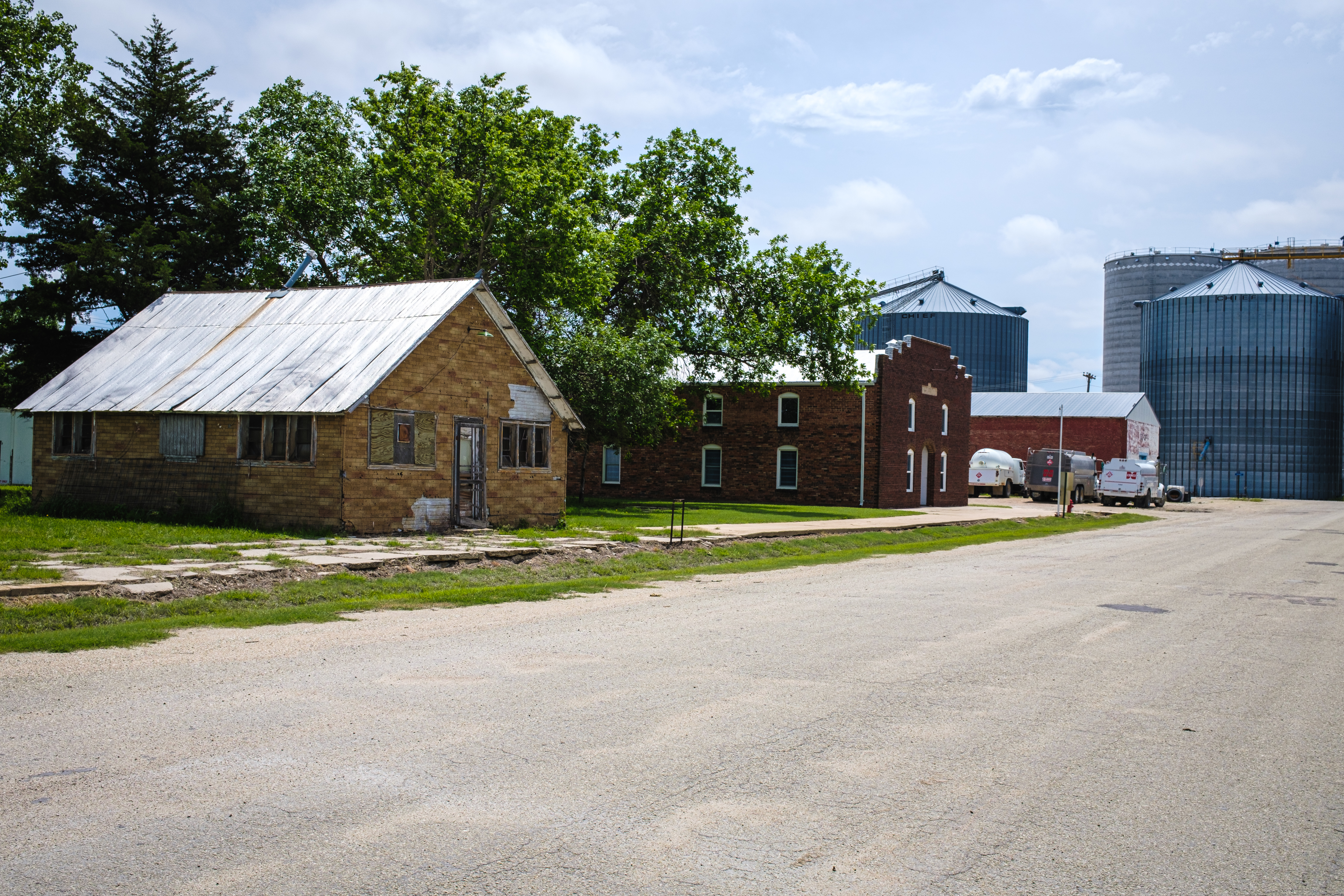
- (2021)

- Location within Smith County and Kansas

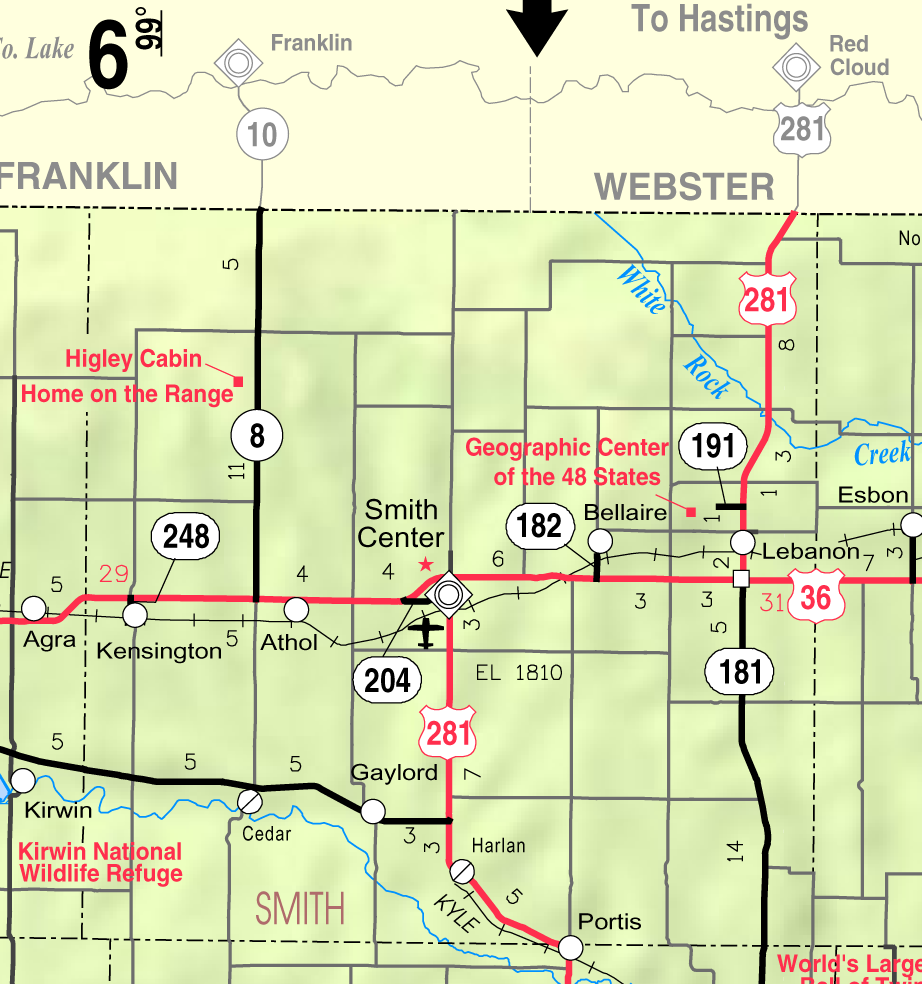
- KDOT map of Smith County (legend)
- Coordinates: 39°45′58″N 98°55′11″W
- Country: United States
- State: Kansas
- County: Smith
- Founded: 1888
- Incorporated: 1911

Area
  - Total: 0.19 sq mi (0.48 km^{2})
  - Land: 0.19 sq mi (0.48 km^{2})
  - Water: 0 sq mi (0.00 km^{2})
- Elevation: 1,791 ft (546 m)

Population (2020)
  - Total: 41
  - Density: 220/sq mi (85/km^{2})
- Time zone: UTC-6 (CST)
  - Summer (DST): UTC-5 (CDT)
- ZIP Code: 66932
- Area code: 785
- FIPS code: 20-03025
- GNIS ID: 2394011

Athol is a city in Smith County, Kansas, United States. As of the 2020 census, the population of the city was 41.

== History ==
Athol was founded in 1888. The first post office in Athol was established in February 1888.

Athol was a station and shipping point on the Chicago, Rock Island and Pacific Railroad.

In the 1870s, the song "Home on the Range" was written by Dr. Brewster Higley in a cabin 8 miles (13 km) north of Athol.

== Geography ==
According to the United States Census Bureau, the city has a total area of 0.18 square miles (0.47 km^{2}), all of it land.

== Demographics ==
Historical population
Census	Pop.	Note	%±
1920	294		—
1930	280		−4.8%
1940	248		−11.4%
1950	203		−18.1%
1960	140		−31.0%
1970	108		−22.9%
1980	90		−16.7%
1990	86		−4.4%
2000	51		−40.7%
2010	44		−13.7%
2020	41		−6.8%
U.S. Decennial Census

=== 2020 census ===
The 2020 United States census counted 41 people, 25 households, and 19 families in Athol. The population density was 221.6 per square mile (85.6/km^{2}). There were 25 housing units at an average density of 135.1 per square mile (52.2/km^{2}). The racial makeup was 100.0% (41) white or European American (100.0% non-Hispanic white), 0.0% (0) black or African-American, 0.0% (0) Native American or Alaska Native, 0.0% (0) Asian, 0.0% (0) Pacific Islander or Native Hawaiian, 0.0% (0) from other races, and 0.0% (0) from two or more races. Hispanic or Latino of any race was 0.0% (0) of the population.

Of the 25 households, 28.0% had children under the age of 18; 56.0% were married couples living together; 12.0% had a female householder with no spouse or partner present. 20.0% of households consisted of individuals and 4.0% had someone living alone who was 65 years of age or older. The average household size was 2.2 and the average family size was 2.6. The percent of those with a bachelor's degree or higher was estimated to be 17.1% of the population.

14.6% of the population was under the age of 18, 2.4% from 18 to 24, 26.8% from 25 to 44, 24.4% from 45 to 64, and 31.7% who were 65 years of age or older. The median age was 46.8 years. For every 100 females, there were 64.0 males. For every 100 females ages 18 and older, there were 59.1 males.

The 2016–2020 5-year American Community Survey estimates show that the median family income was $38,750 (+/- $28,485). Females had a median income of $18,250 (+/- $3,932). The median income for those above 16 years old was $17,750 (+/- $2,936). Approximately, 25.0% of families and 35.5% of the population were below the poverty line, including 100.0% of those under the age of 18 and 0.0% of those ages 65 or over.

=== 2010 census ===
As of the census of 2010, there were 44 people, 17 households, and 14 families residing in the city. The population density was 244.4 inhabitants per square mile (94.4/km^{2}). There were 26 housing units at an average density of 144.4 per square mile (55.8/km^{2}). The racial makeup of the city was 88.6% White and 11.4% from two or more races.

There were 17 households, of which 29.4% had children under the age of 18 living with them, 76.5% were married couples living together, 5.9% had a female householder with no husband present, and 17.6% were non-families. 17.6% of all households were made up of individuals, and 5.9% had someone living alone who was 65 years of age or older. The average household size was 2.59 and the average family size was 2.86.

The median age in the city was 41 years. 25% of residents were under the age of 18; 4.7% were between the ages of 18 and 24; 25% were from 25 to 44; 31.8% were from 45 to 64; and 13.6% were 65 years of age or older. The gender makeup of the city was 43.2% male and 56.8% female.

== Government ==
The Athol government consists of a mayor and five council members. The council meets the 1st Wednesday of each month at 7PM.

== Education ==
The community is served by Thunder Ridge USD 110 public school district.
