= Reamsville, Kansas =

Unincorporated community in Smith County, Kansas

Coordinates: 39°55′48″N 98°52′01″W

Reamsville is an unincorporated community in Smith County, Kansas, United States.

== History ==
A post office was opened in Reamsville ca. 1880, and remained in operation until it was discontinued in 1941.
