= Cedar, Kansas =

City in Smith County, Kansas

- City
- Location within Smith County and Kansas

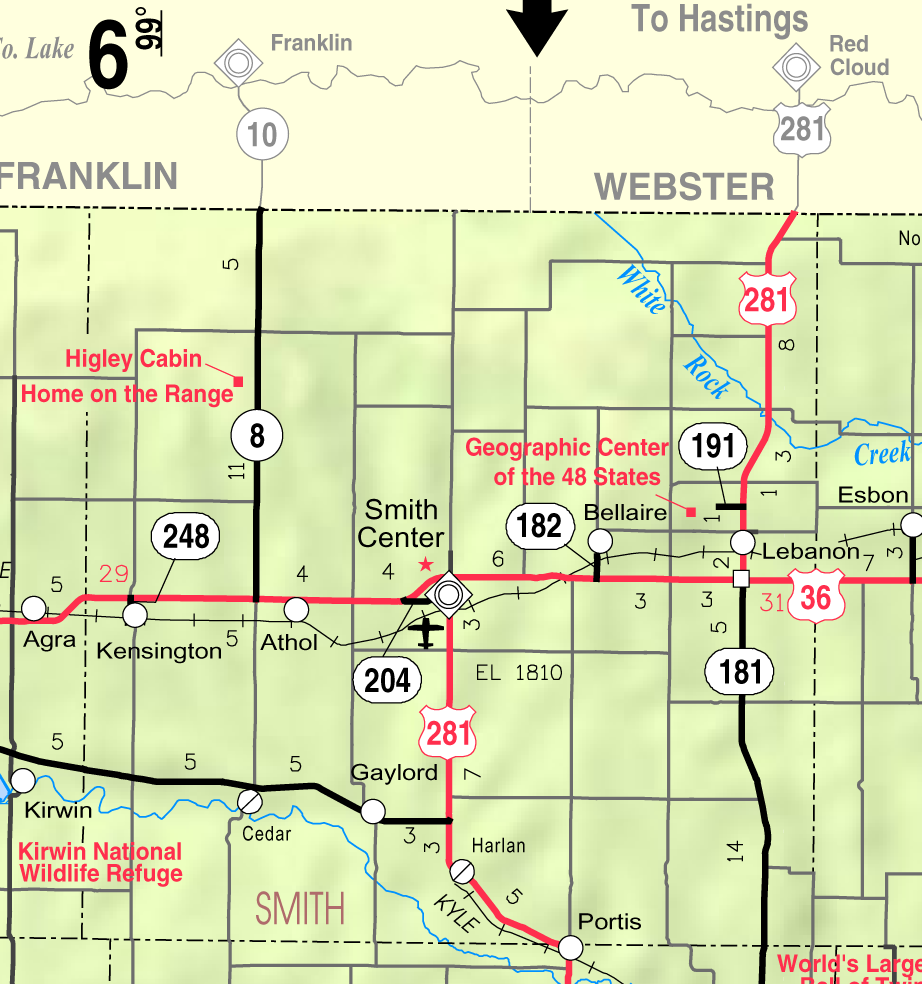
- KDOT map of Smith County (legend)
- Coordinates: 39°39′26″N 98°56′25″W
- Country: United States
- State: Kansas
- County: Smith
- Founded: 1870s
- Incorporated: 1916

Area
  - Total: 0.18 sq mi (0.46 km^{2})
  - Land: 0.18 sq mi (0.46 km^{2})
  - Water: 0 sq mi (0.00 km^{2})
- Elevation: 1,631 ft (497 m)

Population (2020)
  - Total: 11
  - Density: 62/sq mi (24/km^{2})
- Time zone: UTC-6 (CST)
  - Summer (DST): UTC-5 (CDT)
- ZIP Code: 67628
- Area code: 785
- FIPS code: 20-11325
- GNIS ID: 2393773

Cedar is a city in Smith County, Kansas, United States. As of the 2020 census the population of the city was 11.

== History ==
Cedar was a station and shipping point on the Missouri Pacific Railroad.

The first post office in Cedar was established in 1871, but it was called Cedarville until 1906.

== Geography ==
According to the United States Census Bureau, the city has a total area of 0.18 square miles (0.47 km^{2}), all land.

== Demographics ==
Historical population
Census	Pop.	Note	%±
1920	140		—
1930	148		5.7%
1940	144		−2.7%
1950	86		−40.3%
1960	73		−15.1%
1970	46		−37.0%
1980	53		15.2%
1990	25		−52.8%
2000	26		4.0%
2010	14		−46.2%
2020	11		−21.4%
U.S. Decennial Census

=== 2020 census ===
The 2020 United States census counted 11 people, 7 households, and 5 families in Cedar. The population density was 61.8 per square mile (23.9/km^{2}). There were 10 housing units at an average density of 56.2 per square mile (21.7/km^{2}). The racial makeup was 100.0% (11) white or European American (100.0% non-Hispanic white), 0.0% (0) black or African-American, 0.0% (0) Native American or Alaska Native, 0.0% (0) Asian, 0.0% (0) Pacific Islander or Native Hawaiian, 0.0% (0) from other races, and 0.0% (0) from two or more races. Hispanic or Latino of any race was 0.0% (0) of the population.

Of the 7 households, 14.3% had children under the age of 18; 71.4% were married couples living together; 28.6% had a female householder with no spouse or partner present. 28.6% of households consisted of individuals and 14.3% had someone living alone who was 65 years of age or older. The average household size was 2.4 and the average family size was 2.7.

0.0% of the population was under the age of 18, 0.0% from 18 to 24, 0.0% from 25 to 44, 54.5% from 45 to 64, and 45.5% who were 65 years of age or older. The median age was 62.8 years. For every 100 females, there were 57.1 males. For every 100 females ages 18 and older, there were 57.1 males.

The 2016–2020 5-year American Community Survey estimates show that the median household income was $58,750 (with a margin of error of +/- $18,057) and the median family income was $59,167 (+/- $14,677). The median income for those above 16 years old was $46,250 (+/- $45,029).

=== 2010 census ===
As of the census of 2010, there were 14 people, 8 households, and 5 families residing in the city. The population density was 77.8 inhabitants per square mile (30.0/km^{2}). There were 16 housing units at an average density of 88.9 per square mile (34.3/km^{2}). The racial makeup of the city was 100.0% White.

There were 8 households, of which 12.5% had children under the age of 18 living with them, 62.5% were married couples living together, and 37.5% were non-families. 37.5% of all households were made up of individuals, and 25% had someone living alone who was 65 years of age or older. The average household size was 1.75 and the average family size was 2.20.

The median age in the city was 71.3 years. 7.1% of residents were under the age of 18; 0% were between the ages of 18 and 24; 7.1% were from 25 to 44; 14.2% were from 45 to 64; and 71.4% were 65 years of age or older. The gender makeup of the city was 50.0% male and 50.0% female.

== Government ==
The Cedar government consists of a mayor and five council members. The council meets the first Monday of each month at 7 pm.

== Education ==
The community is served by Smith Center USD 237 public school district.
