= Smith County, Kansas =

County in Kansas, United States

- County
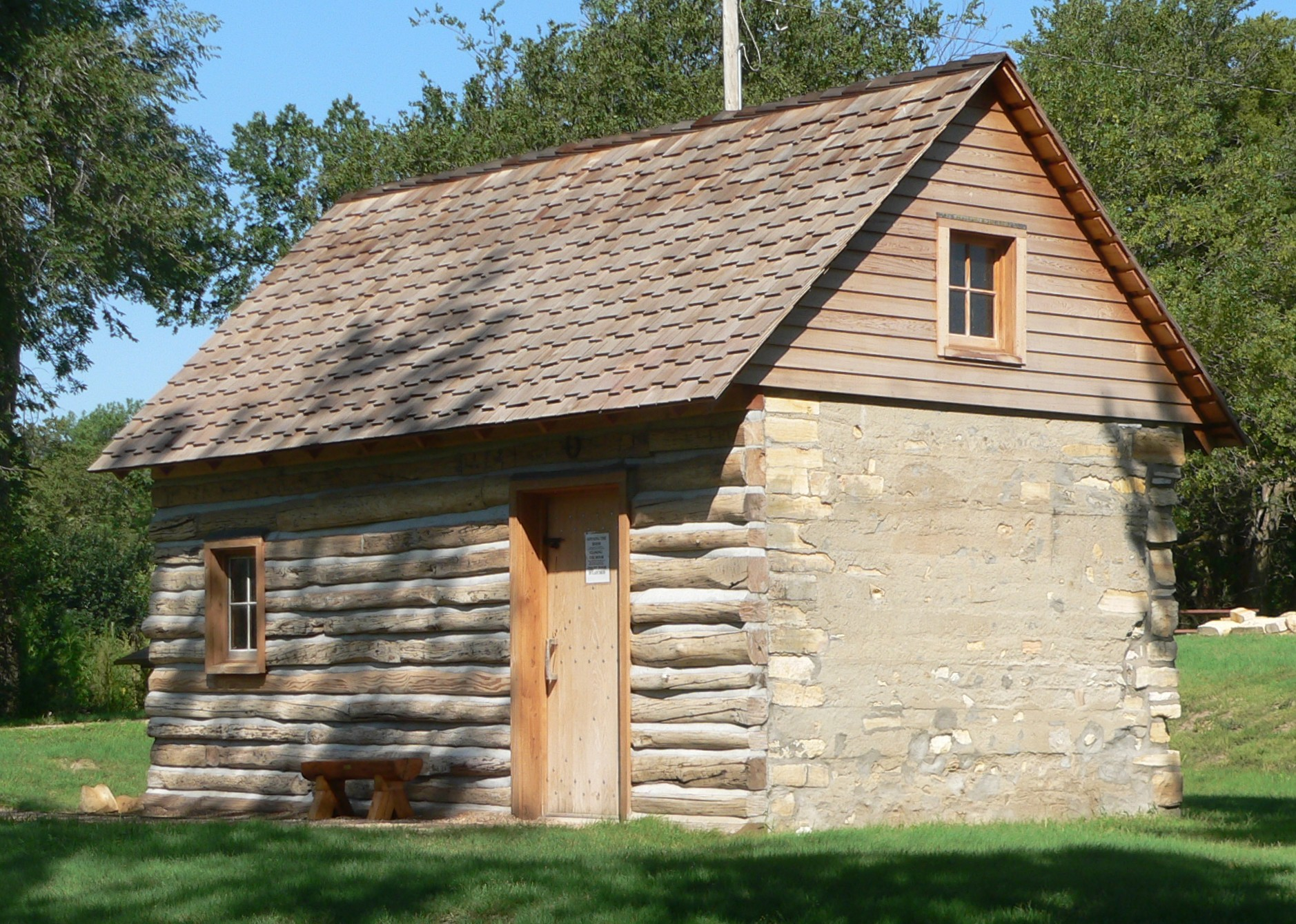
- Home on the Range Cabin near Smith Center (2014)

- Location within the U.S. state of Kansas
- Coordinates: 39°50′N 98°45′W
- Country: United States
- State: Kansas
- Founded: 1872
- Named for: J. Nelson Smith
- Seat: Smith Center
- Largest city: Smith Center

Area
  - Total: 897 sq mi (2,320 km^{2})
  - Land: 895 sq mi (2,320 km^{2})
  - Water: 1.5 sq mi (3.9 km^{2}) 0.2%

Population (2020)
  - Total: 3,570
  - Estimate (2025): 3,566 ▼
  - Density: 3.99/sq mi (1.54/km^{2})
- Time zone: UTC−6 (Central)
  - Summer (DST): UTC−5 (CDT)
- Area code: 785
- Congressional district: 1st
- Website: ks1495.cichosting.com/main/

Smith County is a county located in the U.S. state of Kansas. Its county seat is Smith Center. As of the 2020 census, the population was 3,570. The county is named in memory of J. Nelson Smith, a major in the 2nd Colorado Cavalry, killed at the Battle of Westport on October 21, 1864. The geographic center of the contiguous United States is located within the county, near Lebanon.

== History ==
=== Early history ===
For many millennia, the Great Plains of North America were inhabited by nomadic Native Americans. From the 16th century to 18th century, the Kingdom of France claimed ownership of large parts of North America. In 1762, after the French and Indian War, France secretly ceded New France to Spain, per the Treaty of Fontainebleau.

=== 19th century ===
In 1802, Spain returned most of the land to France, while retaining title to approximately 7,500 square miles (19,000 km^{2}). In 1803, most of the land for modern day Kansas was acquired by the United States from France as part of the 828,000-square-mile (2,140,000 km^{2}) Louisiana Purchase for 2.83 cents per acre.

In 1854, the Kansas Territory was organized, then in 1861 Kansas became the 34th U.S. state. In 1872, Smith County was established. The first homestead in Smith County was in 1871 and there were 3,800 inhabitants by 1875. The county grew to 15,000 people by 1889. Corn was the main crop at first but drought and grasshopper plagues severely hurt the crops. When hardy Winter wheat was introduced to Kansas by Russian settlers, it eventually became the predominant crop in Smith County. The population of the county has slowly declined since 1900 due in large part because of advanced farming techniques that require less human labor.

Brewster Higley wrote the song "Home on the Range" in 1873 in a cabin nine miles northwest of Smith Center. It later became the Kansas State song.

== Geography ==
According to the U.S. Census Bureau, the county has a total area of 897 square miles (2,320 km^{2}), of which 895 square miles (2,320 km^{2}) is land and 1.5 square miles (3.9 km^{2}) (0.2%) is water. The county is divided into 25 townships, each of which is listed below in the subdivisions section of this article.

The geographic center of the 48 contiguous states is located within the county, near the city of Lebanon. The geographic center of North America is located in neighboring Osborne County.

The Solomon River runs through the southern part of the county and provides a flat basin and water for irrigated crops.

=== Major highways ===
There are two major highways serving the county. The main east–west route is U.S. Highway 36, which travels through Athol, Kensington, and Smith Center. The main north–south route is U.S. Highway 281, which intersects US-36 in Smith Center. Kansas state highways K-8, K-9 and K-180 serve other areas of the county.

=== Adjacent counties ===
- Webster County, Nebraska (northeast)
- Jewell County (east)
- Osborne County (south)
- Rooks County (southwest)
- Phillips County (west)
- Franklin County, Nebraska (northwest)

== Demographics ==
Historical population
| Census | Pop. | Note | %± |
|---|---|---|---|
| 1870 | 66 | | — |
| 1880 | 13,883 | | 20,934.8% |
| 1890 | 15,613 | | 12.5% |
| 1900 | 16,384 | | 4.9% |
| 1910 | 15,365 | | −6.2% |
| 1920 | 14,985 | | −2.5% |
| 1930 | 13,545 | | −9.6% |
| 1940 | 10,582 | | −21.9% |
| 1950 | 8,846 | | −16.4% |
| 1960 | 7,776 | | −12.1% |
| 1970 | 6,757 | | −13.1% |
| 1980 | 5,947 | | −12.0% |
| 1990 | 5,078 | | −14.6% |
| 2000 | 4,536 | | −10.7% |
| 2010 | 3,853 | | −15.1% |
| 2020 | 3,570 | | −7.3% |
| 2025 (est.) | 3,566 | ▼ | −0.1% |
U.S. Decennial Census; 1790-1960 1900-1990; 1990-2000 2010-2020

=== Racial and ethnic composition ===
Smith County, Kansas – Racial and ethnic composition Note: the US Census treats Hispanic/Latino as an ethnic category. This table excludes Latinos from the racial categories and assigns them to a separate category. Hispanics/Latinos may be of any race.
| Race / Ethnicity (NH = Non-Hispanic) | Pop 1980 | Pop 1990 | Pop 2000 | Pop 2010 | Pop 2020 | % 1980 | % 1990 | % 2000 | % 2010 | % 2020 |
|---|---|---|---|---|---|---|---|---|---|---|
| White alone (NH) | 5,912 | 5,057 | 4,463 | 3,712 | 3,370 | 99.41% | 99.59% | 98.39% | 96.34% | 94.40% |
| Black or African American alone (NH) | 1 | 4 | 5 | 10 | 12 | 0.02% | 0.08% | 0.11% | 0.26% | 0.34% |
| Native American or Alaska Native alone (NH) | 5 | 6 | 6 | 11 | 15 | 0.08% | 0.12% | 0.13% | 0.29% | 0.42% |
| Asian alone (NH) | 8 | 3 | 2 | 7 | 9 | 0.13% | 0.06% | 0.04% | 0.18% | 0.25% |
| Native Hawaiian or Pacific Islander alone (NH) | x | x | 5 | 3 | 0 | x | x | 0.11% | 0.08% | 0.00% |
| Other race alone (NH) | 8 | 1 | 1 | 1 | 5 | 0.13% | 0.02% | 0.02% | 0.03% | 0.14% |
| Mixed race or Multiracial (NH) | x | x | 21 | 52 | 92 | x | x | 0.46% | 1.35% | 2.58% |
| Hispanic or Latino (any race) | 13 | 7 | 33 | 57 | 67 | 0.22% | 0.14% | 0.73% | 1.48% | 1.88% |
| Total | 5,947 | 5,078 | 4,536 | 3,853 | 3,570 | 100.00% | 100.00% | 100.00% | 100.00% | 100.00% |

=== 2020 census ===
As of the 2020 census, the county had a population of 3,570. The median age was 52.1 years. 19.9% of residents were under the age of 18 and 29.4% of residents were 65 years of age or older. For every 100 females there were 103.2 males, and for every 100 females age 18 and over there were 100.4 males age 18 and over.

The racial makeup of the county was 95.0% White, 0.5% Black or African American, 0.4% American Indian and Alaska Native, 0.3% Asian, 0.0% Native Hawaiian and Pacific Islander, 1.0% from some other race, and 2.9% from two or more races. Hispanic or Latino residents of any race comprised 1.9% of the population.

0.0% of residents lived in urban areas, while 100.0% lived in rural areas.

There were 1,627 households in the county, of which 23.3% had children under the age of 18 living with them and 20.8% had a female householder with no spouse or partner present. About 34.3% of all households were made up of individuals and 17.9% had someone living alone who was 65 years of age or older.

There were 2,026 housing units, of which 19.7% were vacant. Among occupied housing units, 80.9% were owner-occupied and 19.1% were renter-occupied. The homeowner vacancy rate was 2.1% and the rental vacancy rate was 14.8%.

=== 2000 census ===
As of the census of 2000, there were 4,536 people, 1,953 households, and 1,322 families residing in the county. The population density was 5 people per square mile (1.9 people/km^{2}). There were 2,326 housing units at an average density of 3 per square mile (1.2/km^{2}). The racial makeup of the county was 98.79% White, 0.11% Black or African American, 0.24% Native American, 0.04% Asian, 0.11% Pacific Islander, 0.22% from other races, and 0.49% from two or more races. 0.73% of the population were Hispanic or Latino of any race.

Out of the 1,953 households, 25.60% had children under the age of 18 living with them, 60.60% were married couples living together, 4.70% had a female householder with no husband present, and 32.30% were non-families. 30.20% of all households were made up of individuals, and 18.60% had someone living alone who was 65 years of age or older. The average household size was 2.27 and the average family size was 2.78.

In the county, the population was spread out, with 21.70% under the age of 18, 4.70% from 18 to 24, 22.10% from 25 to 44, 23.60% from 45 to 64, and 27.90% who were 65 years of age or older. The median age was 46 years. For every 100 females there were 92.70 males. For every 100 females age 18 and over, there were 90.40 males.

The median income for a household in the county was $28,486, and the median income for a family was $36,951. Males had a median income of $25,089 versus $18,608 for females. The per capita income for the county was $14,983. About 8.80% of families and 10.70% of the population were below the poverty line, including 12.80% of those under age 18 and 9.50% of those age 65 or over.

The population distribution by township is as follows according to the 2000 census: Banner 54; Beaver 60; Blaine 60; Cedar 619; Center 2,094; Cora 38; Crystal Plains 40; Dor 46; Garfield 33; German 34; Harlan 100; Harvey 130; Houston 206; Lane 134; Lincoln 73; Logan 47; Martin 24; Oak 399; Pawnee 35; Pleasant 34; Swan 42; Valley 75; Washington 63; Webster 47; White Rock 49.

== Government ==
=== Presidential elections ===
Presidential election results

United States presidential election results for Smith County, Kansas
| Year | Republican | | Democratic | | Third party(ies) | |
| Year | No. | % | No. | % | No. | % |
|---|---|---|---|---|---|---|
| 1888 | 1,726 | 51.71% | 777 | 23.28% | 835 | 25.01% |
| 1892 | 1,389 | 41.33% | 0 | 0.00% | 1,972 | 58.67% |
| 1896 | 1,385 | 40.23% | 2,019 | 58.64% | 39 | 1.13% |
| 1900 | 1,770 | 46.47% | 1,978 | 51.93% | 61 | 1.60% |
| 1904 | 2,254 | 66.02% | 596 | 17.46% | 564 | 16.52% |
| 1908 | 1,843 | 51.65% | 1,593 | 44.65% | 132 | 3.70% |
| 1912 | 970 | 25.84% | 1,534 | 40.86% | 1,250 | 33.30% |
| 1916 | 2,605 | 41.08% | 3,431 | 54.10% | 306 | 4.82% |
| 1920 | 3,251 | 66.10% | 1,535 | 31.21% | 132 | 2.68% |
| 1924 | 3,226 | 57.23% | 1,634 | 28.99% | 777 | 13.78% |
| 1928 | 4,021 | 74.34% | 1,338 | 24.74% | 50 | 0.92% |
| 1932 | 2,870 | 46.52% | 3,155 | 51.14% | 144 | 2.33% |
| 1936 | 3,292 | 53.48% | 2,847 | 46.25% | 17 | 0.28% |
| 1940 | 3,630 | 65.58% | 1,855 | 33.51% | 50 | 0.90% |
| 1944 | 3,282 | 69.93% | 1,377 | 29.34% | 34 | 0.72% |
| 1948 | 2,760 | 61.94% | 1,590 | 35.68% | 106 | 2.38% |
| 1952 | 3,623 | 77.75% | 986 | 21.16% | 51 | 1.09% |
| 1956 | 3,142 | 72.95% | 1,139 | 26.45% | 26 | 0.60% |
| 1960 | 3,013 | 71.88% | 1,157 | 27.60% | 22 | 0.52% |
| 1964 | 2,026 | 52.34% | 1,809 | 46.73% | 36 | 0.93% |
| 1968 | 2,558 | 67.49% | 939 | 24.78% | 293 | 7.73% |
| 1972 | 2,600 | 74.26% | 818 | 23.36% | 83 | 2.37% |
| 1976 | 2,009 | 58.47% | 1,333 | 38.80% | 94 | 2.74% |
| 1980 | 2,415 | 71.70% | 719 | 21.35% | 234 | 6.95% |
| 1984 | 2,332 | 75.74% | 684 | 22.22% | 63 | 2.05% |
| 1988 | 1,951 | 65.29% | 1,004 | 33.60% | 33 | 1.10% |
| 1992 | 1,236 | 43.34% | 789 | 27.66% | 827 | 29.00% |
| 1996 | 1,628 | 65.38% | 638 | 25.62% | 224 | 9.00% |
| 2000 | 1,534 | 70.24% | 534 | 24.45% | 116 | 5.31% |
| 2004 | 1,803 | 76.08% | 540 | 22.78% | 27 | 1.14% |
| 2008 | 1,719 | 77.78% | 446 | 20.18% | 45 | 2.04% |
| 2012 | 1,624 | 80.28% | 358 | 17.70% | 41 | 2.03% |
| 2016 | 1,661 | 81.34% | 297 | 14.54% | 84 | 4.11% |
| 2020 | 1,763 | 82.81% | 336 | 15.78% | 30 | 1.41% |
| 2024 | 1,675 | 83.50% | 300 | 14.96% | 31 | 1.55% |

=== Laws ===
Following amendment to the Kansas Constitution in 1986, the county remained a prohibition, or "dry", county until 1992, when voters approved the sale of alcoholic liquor by the individual drink with a 30 percent food sales requirement.

== Education ==
=== Unified school districts ===
- Thunder Ridge USD 110
- Smith Center USD 237

== Communities ==
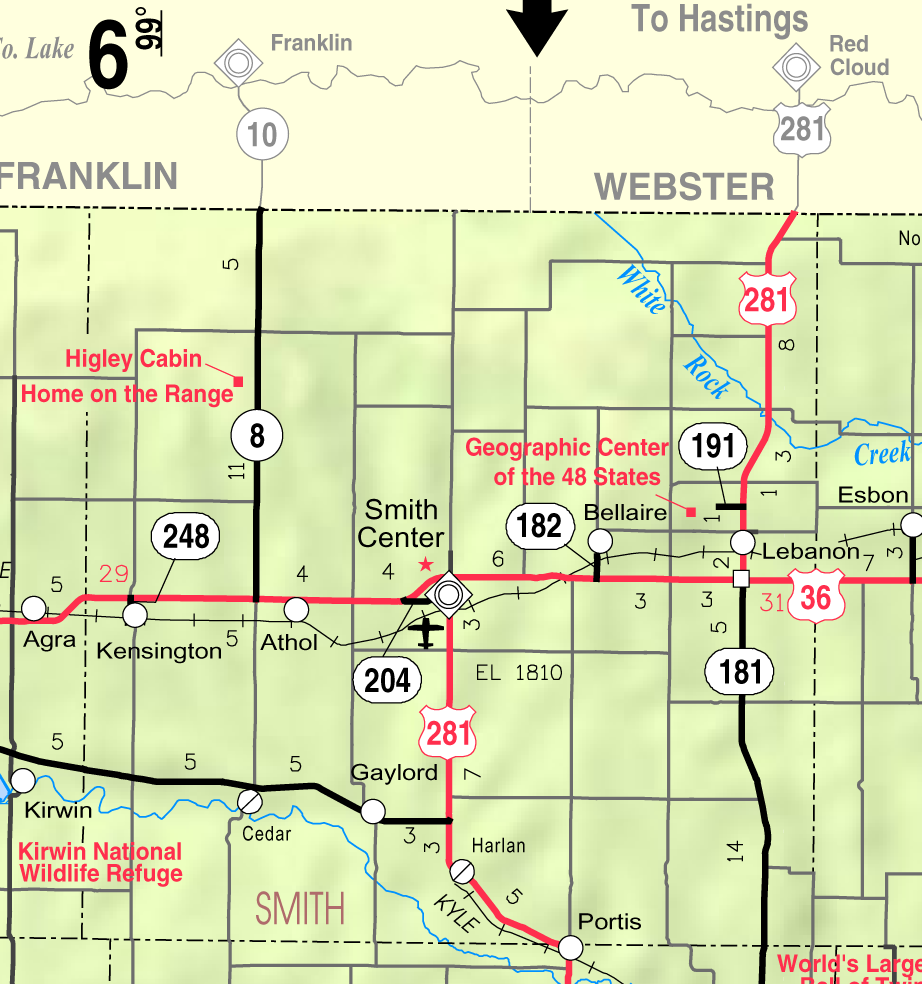
2005 map of Smith County (map legend)

List of townships / incorporated cities / unincorporated communities / extinct former communities within Smith County.

=== Cities ===
- Athol
- Cedar
- Gaylord
- Kensington
- Lebanon
- Smith Center (county seat)

=== Unincorporated communities ===
- Bellaire
- Claudell
- Dispatch
- Harlan
- Reamsville
- Thornburg
- Womer

=== Ghost towns ===
- Anderson
- Clifford
- Cora
- Corvallis
- Germantown
- Hardilee
- Jacksonburg
- Judson
- Ohio
- Twelve Mile

=== Post offices ===
- Covington
- Troublesome

=== Townships ===
Smith County is divided into twenty-five townships. None of the cities within the county are considered governmentally independent, and all figures for the townships include those of the cities. In the following table, the population center is the largest city (or cities) included in that township's population total, if it is of a significant size.

Sources: 2000 U.S. Gazetteer from the U.S. Census Bureau.
| Township | FIPS | Population center | Population | Population density /km^{2} (/sq mi) | Land area km^{2} (sq mi) | Water area km^{2} (sq mi) | Water % | Geographic coordinates |
|---|---|---|---|---|---|---|---|---|
| Banner | 04100 | | 54 | 0.58 (1.50) | 93.29 (36.02) | 0 (0) | 0% | 39°42′3″N 98°47′13″W |
| Beaver | 05200 | | 60 | 0.65 (1.67) | 92.89 (35.86) | 0.27 (0.10) | 0.29% | 39°56′50″N 98°46′34″W |
| Blaine | 07200 | | 60 | 0.64 (1.67) | 93.24 (36.00) | 0.04 (0.01) | 0.04% | 39°47′20″N 98°40′48″W |
| Cedar | 11350 | Kensington | 619 | 6.68 (17.29) | 92.71 (35.80) | 0.08 (0.03) | 0.09% | 39°46′10″N 99°1′50″W |
| Center | 12175 | Smith Center | 2,094 | 22.48 (58.22) | 93.15 (35.97) | 0.04 (0.02) | 0.05% | 39°46′47″N 98°47′7″W |
| Cora | 15525 | | 38 | 0.41 (1.06) | 92.96 (35.89) | 0.17 (0.06) | 0.18% | 39°52′45″N 98°40′7″W |
| Crystal Plains | 16575 | | 40 | 0.43 (1.11) | 93.00 (35.91) | 0.05 (0.02) | 0.05% | 39°41′27″N 98°40′52″W |
| Dor | 18300 | | 46 | 0.50 (1.29) | 92.55 (35.73) | 0.30 (0.11) | 0.32% | 39°37′33″N 99°0′4″W |
| Garfield | 25825 | | 33 | 0.35 (0.92) | 92.96 (35.89) | 0.04 (0.02) | 0.04% | 39°35′48″N 98°40′21″W |
| German | 26150 | | 34 | 0.37 (0.96) | 91.78 (35.44) | 0.27 (0.10) | 0.29% | 39°56′41″N 99°0′39″W |
| Harlan | 30100 | | 100 | 1.07 (2.78) | 93.03 (35.92) | 0.05 (0.02) | 0.05% | 39°36′25″N 98°46′42″W |
| Harvey | 30550 | Cedar | 130 | 1.40 (3.63) | 92.86 (35.85) | 0.00 (0.00) | 0% | 39°41′10″N 98°55′32″W |
| Houston | 33225 | Gaylord | 206 | 2.22 (5.74) | 92.94 (35.88) | 0.14 (0.05) | 0.15% | 39°37′38″N 98°52′12″W |
| Lane | 38450 | Athol | 134 | 1.44 (3.73) | 92.98 (35.90) | 0.03 (0.01) | 0.04% | 39°46′49″N 98°53′30″W |
| Lincoln | 41200 | | 73 | 0.79 (2.04) | 92.80 (35.83) | 0.15 (0.06) | 0.16% | 39°36′13″N 98°33′23″W |
| Logan | 42275 | | 47 | 0.51 (1.32) | 92.50 (35.72) | 0.14 (0.05) | 0.15% | 39°57′5″N 98°34′4″W |
| Martin | 45000 | | 24 | 0.26 (0.67) | 92.49 (35.71) | 0.25 (0.10) | 0.27% | 39°56′40″N 98°54′21″W |
| Oak | 51650 | Lebanon | 399 | 4.30 (11.13) | 92.88 (35.86) | 0.07 (0.03) | 0.07% | 39°48′10″N 98°33′29″W |
| Pawnee | 54825 | | 35 | 0.38 (0.98) | 92.13 (35.57) | 0.41 (0.16) | 0.44% | 39°57′7″N 98°39′50″W |
| Pleasant | 56300 | | 34 | 0.37 (0.95) | 92.69 (35.79) | 0.05 (0.02) | 0.05% | 39°51′28″N 98°54′28″W |
| Swan | 69625 | | 42 | 0.46 (1.18) | 92.00 (35.52) | 0.23 (0.09) | 0.25% | 39°52′56″N 99°1′12″W |
| Valley | 73175 | | 75 | 0.81 (2.09) | 92.82 (35.84) | 0.015 (0.006) | 0.02% | 39°41′28″N 98°59′59″W |
| Washington | 75775 | | 63 | 0.68 (1.76) | 92.87 (35.86) | 0 (0) | 0% | 39°52′54″N 98°46′24″W |
| Webster | 76275 | | 47 | 0.51 (1.31) | 92.76 (35.82) | 0.02 (0.01) | 0.02% | 39°42′27″N 98°34′8″W |
| White Rock | 78000 | | 49 | 0.53 (1.37) | 92.88 (35.86) | 0.04 (0.02) | 0.04% | 39°52′37″N 98°33′5″W |

== See also ==
Community information for Kansas

- Kansas locations by per capita income
- List of counties in Kansas
- List of townships in Kansas
- List of cities in Kansas
- List of unincorporated communities in Kansas
- List of ghost towns in Kansas
