= U.S. Route 281 in Kansas =

Segment of American highway

U.S. Highway 281
- US-281 highlighted in red

Route information
- Maintained by KDOT and the city of Smith Center
- Length: 238.24 mi (383.41 km)
- Existed: c. 1933–present

Major junctions
- South end: US 281 at the Oklahoma state line in Hardtner
- US-160 in Medicine Lodge; US-54 / US-400 in Pratt; US-50 south of St. John; US-56 / K-96 / K-156 in Great Bend; K-4 in Hoisington; I-70 / US-40 south of Russell; US-24 near Osborne; US-36 / K-181 near Smith Center
- North end: US 281 at the Nebraska state line near Red Cloud, NE

Location
- Country: United States
- State: Kansas
- Counties: Barber, Pratt, Stafford, Barton, Russell, Osborne, Smith

Highway system
- United States Numbered Highway System; List; Special; Divided; Kansas State Highway System; Interstate; US; State; Spurs

U.S. Route 281 (US-281) is a part of the U.S. Highway System that runs from near the Mexican border north to the International Peace Garden, north of Dunseith, North Dakota, at the Canadian border, where it continues as Highway 10. In the state of Kansas, US-281 is a main north–south highway that runs from the Oklahoma border north to the Nebraska border. US-281 passes within one mile (1.6 km) to the east of the Geographic center of the contiguous United States, which its connected to via K-191 (Kansas highway) (K-191).

Between 1933 and 1936, US-281 was extended south into Kansas to US-36 south of Lebanon. Then between July 1938 and 1940, US-281 was extended south into Oklahoma.

== Route description ==
US-281 enters the state at Hardtner in Barber County and passes through Medicine Lodge, Pratt, St. John and Great Bend, the only city along the route in Kansas which has more than 7,000 people. Along its venture through southern Kansas, US-281 intersects several major east–west routes: first US-54 and US-400, which heads east to Wichita and west to Dodge City, Garden City and Liberal; US-50, which veers east to Hutchinson and west to Garden City; and US-56, heading to Dodge City westbound and Olathe eastbound.

Following a four-mile (6 km) concurrency with K-4 near Hoisington, the highway intersects I-70 at Russell before joining K-18 near Paradise for an eight-mile (13 km) concurrency.

The two highways split at Luray, and US-281 turns north into Osborne County, passing through the town of Osborne before joining US-24 and K-9 for another concurrency. US-281 joins US-36 at Smith Center, turning east before the two highways split; US-281 turns north for its final stretch in the state, passing through Lebanon. All sections of US-281 in Kansas are two-lane. The last stretches of the highway overlaid with bricks, through downtown Pratt and Hoisington, were recently resurfaced with concrete.

== History ==
=== Early roads and establishment ===
Between 1933 and 1936, US-281 was extended south into Kansas to US-36 south of Lebanon, which replaced the former K-65. In a March 3, 1936 resolution, a 10 mile section of K-8 (modern US-281) was realigned north of Russell. Then between July 1938 and 1940, US-281 was extended south into Oklahoma, which replaced K-8.

=== Realignments ===
In a June 6, 1936 resolution, US-281 was slightly realigned north of Lebanon to eliminate two sharp turns. In a December 5, 1939 resolution, it was realigned from K-18 southward to the new alignment that was approved in the March 3, 1936 resolution, which completely straightened its alignment between Russell and K-18. In a July 10, 1946 resolution, a roughly 2.5 miles (4.0 km) section was realigned from US-160 southward, near Medicine Lodge, to eliminated several sharp curves. This realignment created a short overlap with US-160. In an August 28, 1946 resolution, US-281 was realigned by Luray to eliminate several sharp curves and turns. In a December 9, 1948 resolution, an approximately 4.3 miles (6.9 km) section of US-281 was realigned in Great Bend. In a September 27, 1950 resolution, US-281 was realigned in and north of Lebanon to eliminate four sharp curves. In another September 27, 1950 resolution, US-281 was realigned just south of the Nebraska border to eliminate two sharp curves. In a January 11, 1951 resolution, an approximately six miles (9.7 km) section of US-281 was realigned northwest of Sawyer, which eliminated a sharp turn and two railroad crossings. In a February 14, 1951 resolution, a roughly twelve miles (19 km) section of US-281 was realigned northwest of Kiowa to eliminate eight sharp curves. In a January 28, 1954 resolution, US-50S (modern US-50) was realigned between US-281 and Stafford to eliminate several sharp curves, which created a short overlap with US-281. The overlap lasted a little over a year, then in a September 14, 1955 resolution, US-50S was realigned to continue west from US-281. In Pratt, US-54 originally overlapped US-281 from 5th Street to 1st Street. Then in a January 4, 1956 resolution, US-54 was realigned to cross US-281 and follow 1st Street. In a December 22, 1958 resolution, a four miles (6.4 km) section of I-70 was planned along with a diamond interchange to connect to US-281. In another December 22, 1958 resolution, a short section of US-281 was realigned northwest of Portis to eliminate three sharp curves. US-281 originally continued past Iliff Street along US-160 to Main Street where it turned north. It continued north to Stolp Avenue where it turned west and continued to Iliff Street where it turned north. Then in an August 24, 1966 resolution it was realigned to turn north of US-160 at Iliff Street. US-40 Business, which overlaps US-281 in Russell, was originally known as US-40 Alternate until 1981. K-14 originally overlapped US-281 from the Oklahoma border to K-2, then in a December 21, 1994 resolution K-14 was truncated to US-160 in Harper. In a November 15, 2013 resolution, US-40 Business was decommissioned, which eliminated the overlap with US-281.

In mid 2019, work began to convert the junction with US-50 to an enhanced roundabout. The roundabout includes outer diamond shape lanes for oversized loads to bypass the roundabout. The former intersection with US-50 was dangerous as only US-281 traffic had to stop and therefore was the location of several injury and fatal accidents. Between 2002 and 2012, there were 21 accidents, resulting in one fatality. On March 4, 2020, traffic was rerouted, from a four-way stop and temporary asphalt detour, onto the permanent concrete outer roads for the roundabout. The roundabout was completed and opened up to traffic on May 22, 2020. Venture Corporation from Great Bend, was the primary contractor for the $5.2 million project.

== Major intersections ==
County	Location	mi	km	Destinations	Notes
Barber		0.000	0.000	US 281 south – Alva, OK	Continuation into Oklahoma
Barber				K-2 east – Kiowa, Anthony	Western terminus of K-2
Barber				US-160 west – Coldwater	Southern end of US-160 overlap
Barber	Medicine Lodge			US-160 east (West Fowler Avenue) – Medicine Lodge	Northern end of US-160 overlap
Pratt	Sawyer			K-42 east (Broadway Street) – Isabel	Western terminus of K-42
Pratt				Lake Road – Pratt County Lake, Wildlife Museum, Fish Hatchery	Western terminus of former K-64
Pratt	Pratt			US-54 / US-400 (1st Street) – Kingman, Greensburg	
Stafford				US-50 – Kinsley, Hutchinson	
Stafford				K-19 west (Northwest 140th Street) – Larned	Eastern terminus of K-19
Barton	Great Bend			US-56 / K-96 / K-156 (10th Street) – Lyons, Larned	
Barton	Great Bend			24th Street	Northern terminus of former US 281 Alt.
Barton	Hoisington			K-4 east to K-156	Southern end of K-4 overlap
Barton				K-4 west – Lacrosse	Northern end of K-4 overlap
Russell				I-70 / US-40 – Salina, Hays	I-70 exit 184; diamond interchange
Russell	Russell			Wichita Avenue	Former US 40 Bus. east
Russell				K-18 west – Plainville	Southern end of K-18 overlap
Russell	Luray			K-18 east – Lucas	Northern end of K-18 overlap
Osborne	Osborne			US-24 west – Stockton	Southern end of US-24 overlap
Osborne				US-24 east / K-9 east – Downs, Beloit, Waconda Lake	Northern end of US-24 overlap; southern end of K-9 overlap
Smith				K-9 west – Gaylord	Northern end of K-9 overlap
Smith	Smith Center			K-204 west (West New York Street)	Eastern terminus of K-204
Smith	Smith Center			US-36 west – Phillipsburg	Southern end of US-36 overlap
Smith				US-36 east – Mankato / K-181 south – Downs	Northern end of US-36 overlap; northern terminus of K-181; diamond interchange
Smith				K-191 west – Geographic Center of Continental USA	Eastern terminus of K-191
Smith				US 281 north – Red Cloud, NE	Continuation into Nebraska
1.000 mi = 1.609 km; 1.000 km = 0.621 mi: Concurrency terminus

== Alternate route ==
U.S. Highway 281 Alternate
- Location: Great Bend, Kansas
- Length: 1.4 mi (2.3 km)
- Existed: c. 1955–c. 1983

U.S. Route 281 Alternate was a 1.4-mile (2.3 km) long alternate route of U.S. Route 281 running within the northeastern and eastern portions of Great Bend, Kansas. US-281 Alternate was formed in 1955 and was decommissioned about 1983. Since then it has been known as US 281 Bypass, which is mostly unsigned, two-lane surface highway bypasses downtown Great Bend. The only visible indication of this being a bypass is via street signs along intersecting streets; thus it is not a true bypass route, but a local street that is named as a bypass.

=== Route description ===
281 Bypass begins near the intersection of 10th (US-56/K-96/K-156) and Pine Streets. 10th Street, which is normally east–west, travels slightly southwest-northeast for one block with its intersection with the bypass.

The bypass travels mostly to the northwest until near Park and Frey Streets. Then, it steers towards the north-northwest.

After intersecting with 22nd Street, 281 Bypass starts to curve to the west until it intersects with 24th Street. It remains unsigned on 24th Street until its northwestern terminus with its parent route on Main Street (US-281). The northwestern terminus of U.S. Highway 281 Bypass is directly adjacent to Brit Spaugh Park in Great Bend.
