= Smith Center, Kansas =

City in Smith County, Kansas

- City and county seat
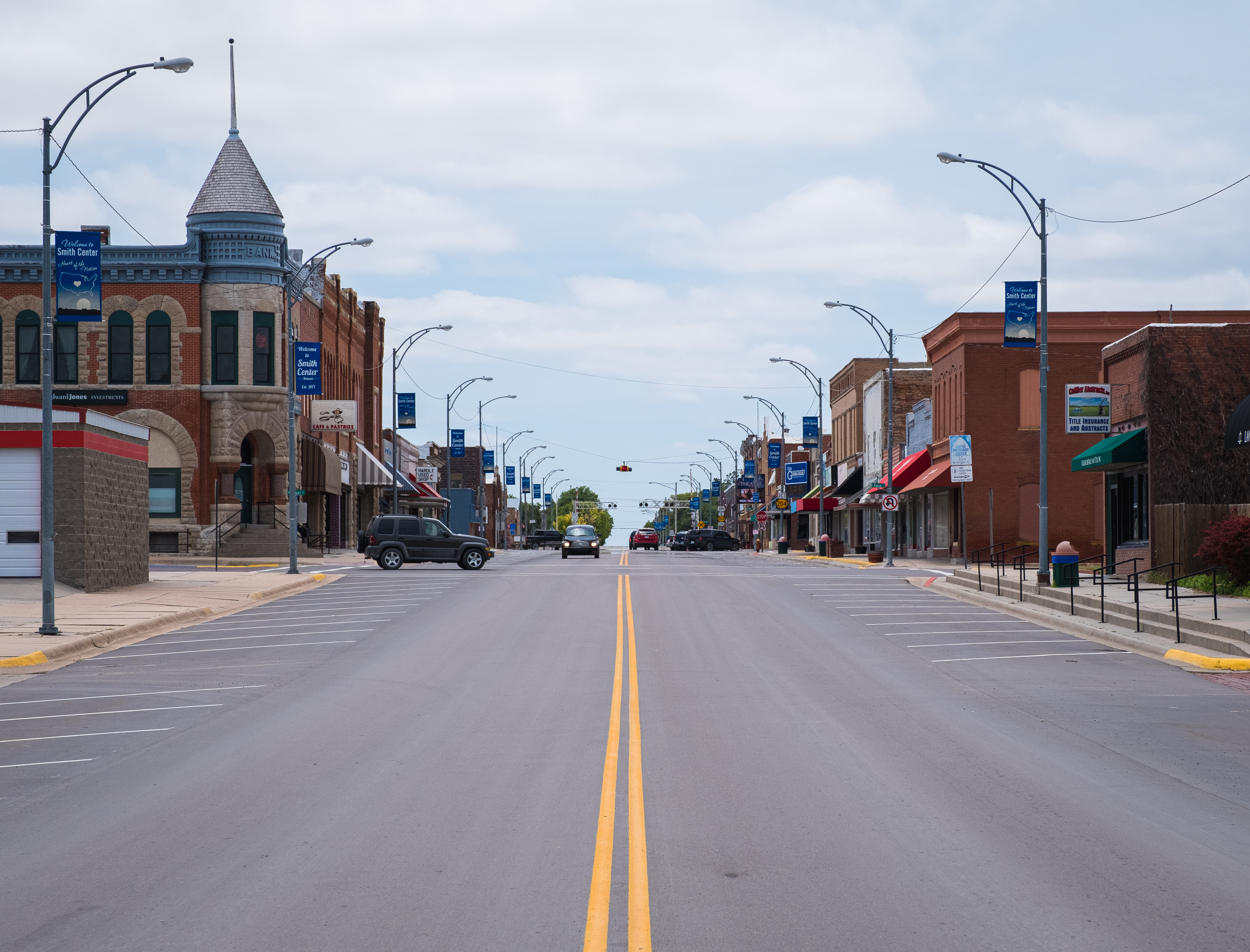
- Downtown Smith Center (2021)

- Location within Smith County and Kansas

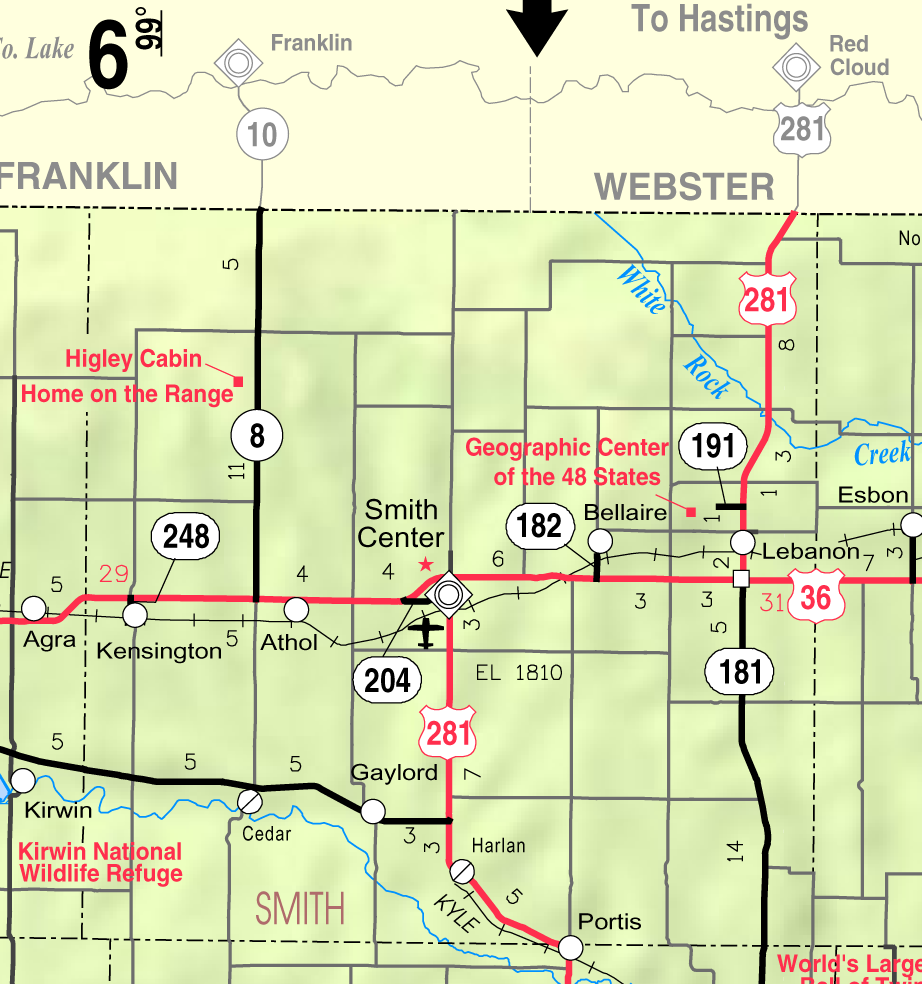
- KDOT map of Smith County (legend)
- Coordinates: 39°46′26″N 98°47′00″W
- Country: United States
- State: Kansas
- County: Smith
- Founded: 1871
- Incorporated: 1886
- Named for: Maj. J. Nelson Smith

Area
  - Total: 1.29 sq mi (3.33 km^{2})
  - Land: 1.29 sq mi (3.33 km^{2})
  - Water: 0 sq mi (0.00 km^{2})
- Elevation: 1,808 ft (551 m)

Population (2020)
  - Total: 1,571
  - Density: 1,220/sq mi (472/km^{2})
- Time zone: UTC-6 (CST)
  - Summer (DST): UTC-5 (CDT)
- ZIP Code: 66967
- Area code: 785
- FIPS code: 20-65925
- GNIS ID: 2395900
- Website: smithcenterks.com

Smith Center is a city in and the county seat of Smith County, Kansas, United States. As of the 2020 census, the population of the city was 1,571.

== History ==
Smith Center was founded in 1871. The first post office in Smith Center was established in January 1873. Like Smith County, Smith Center was named for Maj. J. Nelson Smith of the 2nd Colorado Cavalry, a pre-war native of Elwood, Kansas, who died leading his regiment on October 21, 1864 at the Battle of the Little Blue River.

== Geography ==
According to the United States Census Bureau, the city has a total area of 1.24 square miles (3.21 km^{2}), all land.

Smith Center is located at the junction of U.S. Routes 281 and 36, approximately 100 miles south of Grand Island, Nebraska and 77 miles north of Russell and Interstate 70.

=== Climate ===
Climate data for Smith Center, Kansas (1991–2020 normals, extremes 1910–present)
Month	Jan	Feb	Mar	Apr	May	Jun	Jul	Aug	Sep	Oct	Nov	Dec	Year
Record high °F (°C)	79 (26)	85 (29)	91 (33)	102 (39)	105 (41)	113 (45)	112 (44)	111 (44)	105 (41)	98 (37)	87 (31)	77 (25)	113 (45)
Mean maximum °F (°C)	62.4 (16.9)	68.8 (20.4)	79.7 (26.5)	87.7 (30.9)	94.2 (34.6)	100.4 (38.0)	104.0 (40.0)	101.4 (38.6)	97.1 (36.2)	89.0 (31.7)	74.8 (23.8)	62.5 (16.9)	104.8 (40.4)
Mean daily maximum °F (°C)	38.9 (3.8)	43.7 (6.5)	55.4 (13.0)	65.7 (18.7)	75.7 (24.3)	87.1 (30.6)	92.1 (33.4)	89.1 (31.7)	81.7 (27.6)	68.1 (20.1)	53.4 (11.9)	40.9 (4.9)	66.0 (18.9)
Daily mean °F (°C)	27.3 (−2.6)	31.2 (−0.4)	41.6 (5.3)	51.8 (11.0)	63.0 (17.2)	74.1 (23.4)	79.1 (26.2)	76.3 (24.6)	68.0 (20.0)	54.4 (12.4)	40.5 (4.7)	29.8 (−1.2)	53.1 (11.7)
Mean daily minimum °F (°C)	15.7 (−9.1)	18.8 (−7.3)	27.9 (−2.3)	37.9 (3.3)	50.2 (10.1)	61.0 (16.1)	66.1 (18.9)	63.4 (17.4)	54.4 (12.4)	40.7 (4.8)	27.7 (−2.4)	18.6 (−7.4)	40.2 (4.6)
Mean minimum °F (°C)	−1.7 (−18.7)	1.7 (−16.8)	11.2 (−11.6)	23.9 (−4.5)	36.0 (2.2)	49.4 (9.7)	57.2 (14.0)	54.4 (12.4)	40.0 (4.4)	24.5 (−4.2)	11.6 (−11.3)	2.2 (−16.6)	−6.2 (−21.2)
Record low °F (°C)	−26 (−32)	−20 (−29)	−18 (−28)	11 (−12)	27 (−3)	38 (3)	43 (6)	40 (4)	23 (−5)	3 (−16)	−6 (−21)	−26 (−32)	−26 (−32)
Average precipitation inches (mm)	0.59 (15)	0.70 (18)	1.45 (37)	2.12 (54)	4.00 (102)	3.64 (92)	4.39 (112)	3.42 (87)	1.98 (50)	1.86 (47)	1.16 (29)	0.79 (20)	26.10 (663)
Average snowfall inches (cm)	4.4 (11)	5.9 (15)	2.3 (5.8)	0.7 (1.8)	0.0 (0.0)	0.0 (0.0)	0.0 (0.0)	0.0 (0.0)	0.0 (0.0)	0.5 (1.3)	1.5 (3.8)	3.0 (7.6)	18.3 (46)
Average precipitation days (≥ 0.01 in)	3.9	4.2	6.7	8.2	11.0	10.1	10.0	8.8	6.2	6.1	4.6	4.0	83.8
Average snowy days (≥ 0.1 in)	2.9	3.1	1.6	0.5	0.0	0.0	0.0	0.0	0.0	0.2	1.0	2.6	11.9
Source: NOAA

== Demographics ==
Historical population
Census	Pop.	Note	%±
1880	254		—
1890	767		202.0%
1900	1,142		48.9%
1910	1,292		13.1%
1920	1,567		21.3%
1930	1,736		10.8%
1940	1,686		−2.9%
1950	2,026		20.2%
1960	2,379		17.4%
1970	2,389		0.4%
1980	2,240		−6.2%
1990	2,016		−10.0%
2000	1,931		−4.2%
2010	1,665		−13.8%
2020	1,571		−5.6%
U.S. Decennial Census

=== 2020 census ===
As of the 2020 census, Smith Center had a population of 1,571. The median age was 49.4 years. 19.5% of residents were under the age of 18 and 27.9% of residents were 65 years of age or older. For every 100 females, there were 98.1 males, and for every 100 females age 18 and over, there were 92.8 males age 18 and over.

0.0% of residents lived in urban areas, while 100.0% lived in rural areas.

There were 727 households in Smith Center, of which 20.8% had children under the age of 18 living in them. Of all households, 46.4% were married-couple households, 21.0% were households with a male householder and no spouse or partner present, and 27.4% were households with a female householder and no spouse or partner present. About 41.6% of all households were made up of individuals and 21.7% had someone living alone who was 65 years of age or older.

There were 893 housing units, of which 18.6% were vacant. The homeowner vacancy rate was 3.4% and the rental vacancy rate was 14.3%.

Racial composition as of the 2020 census
Race	Number	Percent
White	1,481	94.3%
Black or African American	4	0.3%
American Indian and Alaska Native	8	0.5%
Asian	3	0.2%
Native Hawaiian and Other Pacific Islander	0	0.0%
Some other race	20	1.3%
Two or more races	55	3.5%
Hispanic or Latino (of any race)	40	2.5%

=== 2010 census ===
As of the census of 2010, there were 1,665 people, 779 households, and 470 families living in the city. The population density was 1,342.7 inhabitants per square mile (518.4/km^{2}). There were 928 housing units at an average density of 748.4 per square mile (289.0/km^{2}). The racial makeup of the city was 97.7% White, 0.1% African American, 0.4% Native American, 0.1% Asian, 0.2% Pacific Islander, 0.4% from other races, and 1.1% from two or more races. Hispanic or Latino of any race were 1.0% of the population.

There were 779 households, of which 23.2% had children under the age of 18 living with them, 49.8% were married couples living together, 7.1% had a female householder with no husband present, 3.5% had a male householder with no wife present, and 39.7% were non-families. 36.8% of all households were made up of individuals, and 21.1% had someone living alone who was 65 years of age or older. The average household size was 2.10 and the average family size was 2.71.

The median age in the city was 48.7 years. 20.6% of residents were under the age of 18; 5.4% were between the ages of 18 and 24; 18% were from 25 to 44; 26.8% were from 45 to 64; and 28.9% were 65 years of age or older. The gender makeup of the city was 47.2% male and 52.8% female.

== Government ==
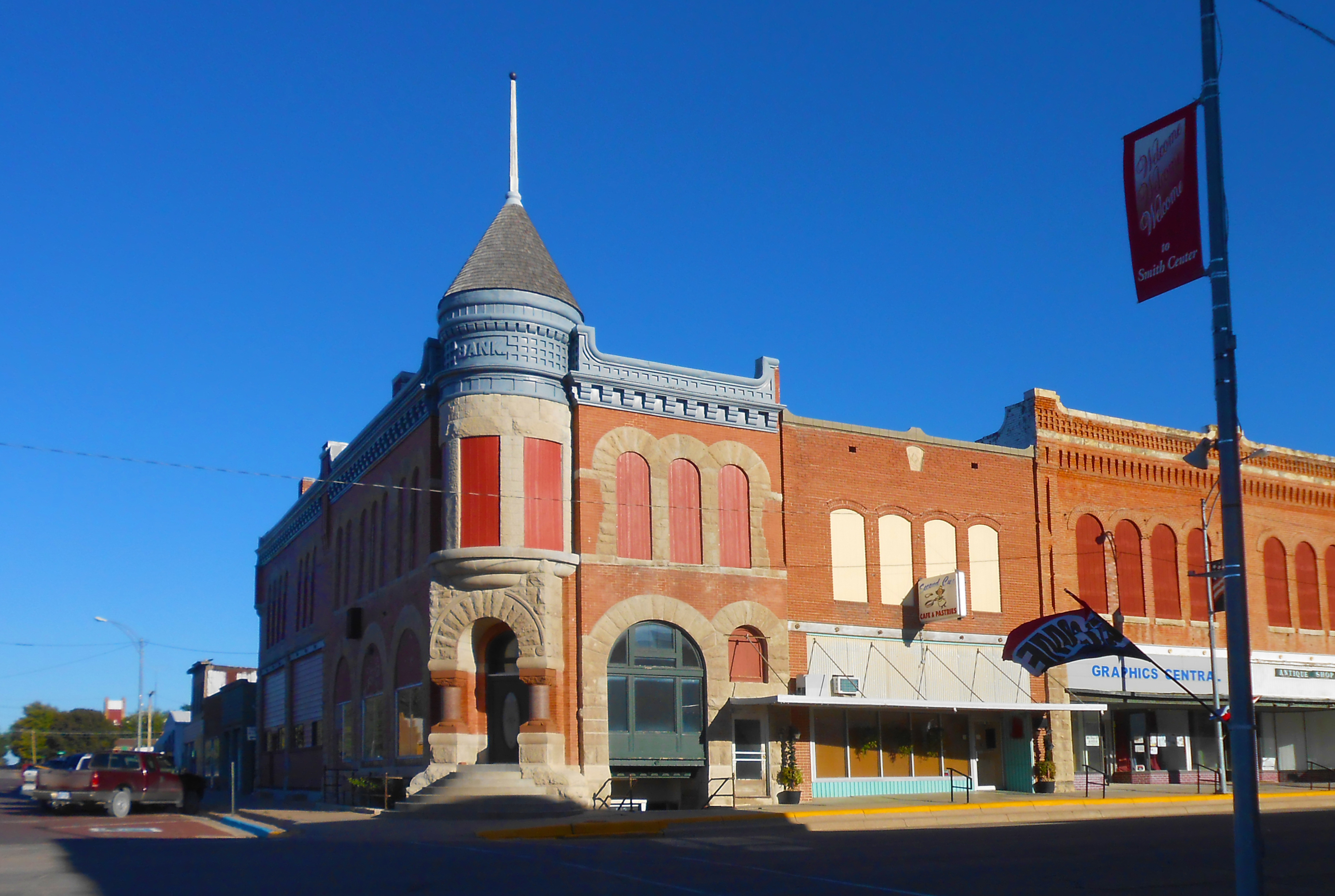
First National Bank (2013)

The Smith Center government consists of a mayor and five council members.

- City Hall, 119 West Court Street.

== Education ==
=== Primary and secondary education ===
The community is served by Smith Center USD 237 public school district. The district has two schools in Smith Center:

- Smith Center Junior/Senior High School, 300 Roger Barta Way, Grades 7 to 12.
- Smith Center Elementary School, 216 South Jefferson Street, Grades K to 6.

== Notable people ==
- Roscoe "Fatty" Arbuckle, silent film star
- Nolan Cromwell, former NFL defensive back
- Mitch Holthus, radio announcer for the Kansas City Chiefs
- Mark Simoneau, former NFL linebacker, College Football Hall of Famer
- Steve Tasker, former NFL wide receiver
- Albert F. "Jud" Wagner, Kansas' last confirmed World War I veteran
- Evelyn Wilson, Justice of the Kansas Supreme Court
