= Big Creek Township, Russell County, Kansas =

Township in Russell County, Kansas, U.S.

Big Creek Township
- Township
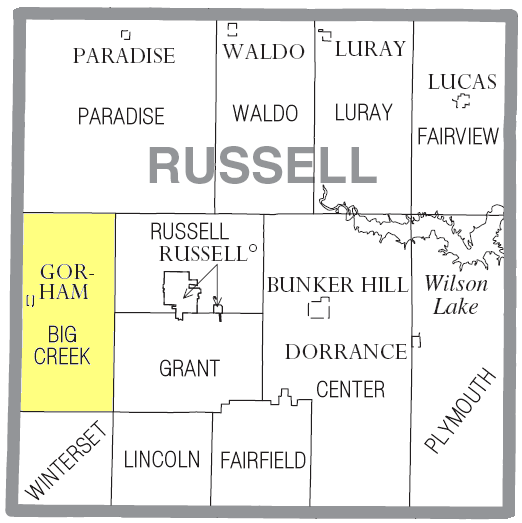
- Location of Big Creek Township in Russell County
- Coordinates: 38°52′16″N 98°59′02″W
- Country: United States
- State: Kansas
- County: Russell

Government
  - Districts 1 and 4 County Commissioners: Steve Reinhardt and Dean Haselhorst

Area
  - Total: 71.85 sq mi (186.1 km^{2})
  - Land: 71.83 sq mi (186.0 km^{2})
  - Water: 0.02 sq mi (0.052 km^{2}) 0.03%
- Elevation: 1,890 ft (580 m)

Population (2020)
  - Total: 549
  - Density: 7.64/sq mi (2.95/km^{2})
- Time zone: UTC-6 (Central (CST))
  - Summer (DST): UTC-5 (CDT)
- ZIP Code: 67640, 67665
- Area code: 785
- GNIS ID: 475213

Big Creek Township is a township in Russell County, Kansas, United States. As of the 2020 United States census, it had a population of 549.

== Geography ==
The center of Big Creek Township is located at 38°52′16″N 98°59′02″W (38.8711228, −98.9839787) at an elevation of 1,890 feet (580 m). The township lies in the Smoky Hills region of the Great Plains. Big Creek, a tributary of the Smoky Hill River and the township's namesake, flows windingly east through the southern part of the township. Walker Creek, a tributary of Big Creek, runs southeast through the southern half of the township to its confluence with Big Creek. Another tributary of the Smoky Hill, Fossil Creek, has its source in east-central Big Creek Township. Salt Creek, a tributary of the Saline River, flows east through the northern part of the township.

According to the United States Census Bureau, Big Creek Township occupies an area of 71.85 square miles (186.1 km^{2}) of which 71.83 square miles (186.0 km^{2}) is land and 0.02 square miles (0.052 km^{2}) is water. Located in west-central Russell County, it includes the city of Gorham, which is located in the west-central part of the township, and it borders Paradise Township to the north, Russell and Grant Townships to the east, Lincoln Township to the southeast, Winterset Township to the south, and Herzog Township to the west.

== Demographics ==
Historical population
Census	Pop.	Note	%±
1880	846		—
1890	480		−43.3%
1900	593		23.5%
1910	798		34.6%
1920	703		−11.9%
1930	875		24.5%
1940	1,118		27.8%
1950	926		−17.2%
1960	737		−20.4%
1970	572		−22.4%
1980	508		−11.2%
1990	528		3.9%
2000	515		−2.5%
2010	479		−7.0%
2020	549		14.6%
U.S. Decennial Census

As of the 2020 census, there were 549 people and 241 households residing in the township. The population density was 7.64 people per square mile (2.95 people/km^{2}). There were 267 housing units. The racial makeup of the township was 94.4% White, 0.9% Black or African American, 0.4% Asian, and 4.4% from two or more races. Hispanic or Latino of any race were 3.1% of the population.

There were 241 households, out of which 36.7% had children under the age of 18 living with them, 60.2% were married couples living together, 12.0% had a male householder with no wife present, 21.6% had a female householder with no husband present, and 28.3% were non-families. The average family size was 3.50.

In the township, the population was spread out, with 44.4% under the age of 19, 11.8% from 20 to 24, 34.4% from 25 to 44, 12.8% from 45 to 64, and 17.5% who were 65 years of age or older. The median age was 27.3 years. For every 100 females, there were 102.4 males. For every 100 females age 19 and over, there were 93.5 males age 19 and over.

== Education ==
Big Creek Township lies within Russell County USD 407.

== Transportation ==
Interstate 70 and U.S. Route 40 run concurrently east–west through Big Creek Township, interchanging with 176th Street, a paved north–south county road, one mile south of Gorham. The former alignment of U.S. 40 runs broadly east–west through Gorham and the township, connecting to a network of mostly unpaved county roads laid out in a rough grid pattern. Another paved north–south road, Gorham-Fairport Road, runs north from old U.S. 40 one mile east of Gorham.

The Kansas Pacific line of the Union Pacific Railroad runs through the township parallel to the old alignment of U.S. 40.
