= Fairport, Kansas =

Unincorporated community in Russell County, Kansas

- Unincorporated community
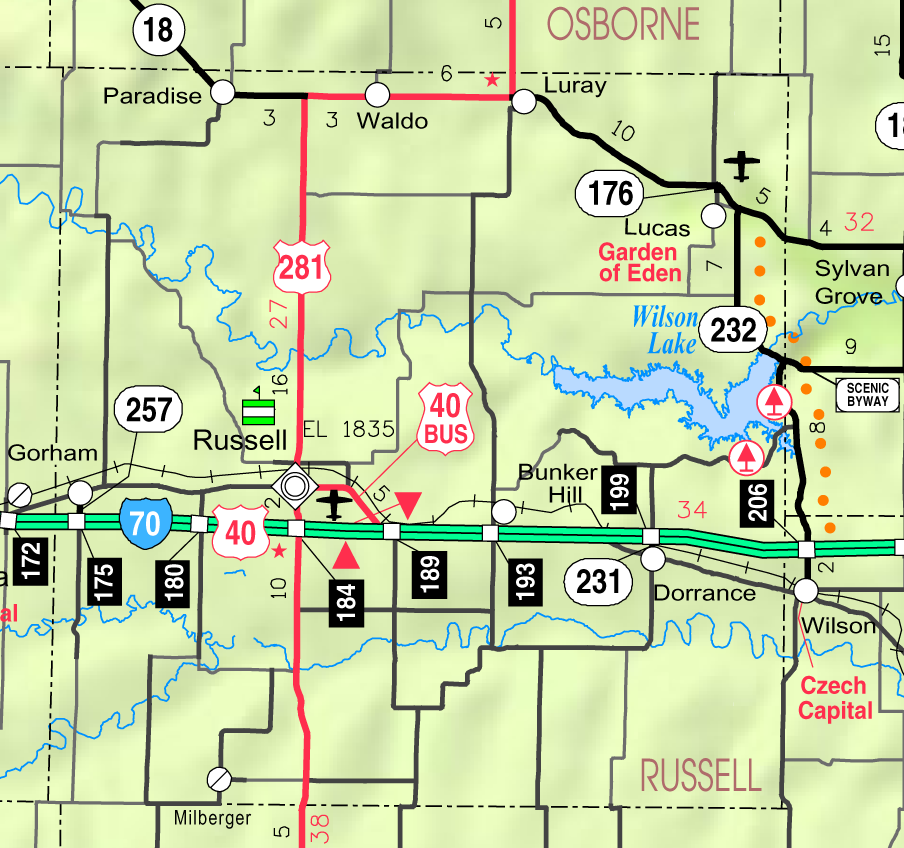
- KDOT map of Russell County (legend)

- Location within Kansas Location within the United States
- Coordinates: 39°02′45″N 99°01′50″W
- Country: United States
- State: Kansas
- County: Russell
- Founded: 1870s
- Elevation: 1,680 ft (510 m)
- Time zone: UTC-6 (CST)
  - Summer (DST): UTC-5 (CDT)
- ZIP Code: 67665
- Area code: 785
- FIPS code: 20-22375
- GNIS ID: 472526

Fairport is an unincorporated community in Paradise Township, Russell County, Kansas, United States. It is located about 12 miles north of Gorham near the west county line and next the Saline River.

== History ==
In 1879, Knight & Bradshaw built Fairport Mills, a steam and water-powered flour mill, at a site on the Saline River northwest of Russell, Kansas. A rural post office had opened near the site in October 1878 under the name Clarkson, but changed its name to Fairport in 1881. The community of Fairport grew up around the mill and, by 1910, had local trade and a population of 75. The post office closed in 1959.

== Geography ==
Fairport lies in the Smoky Hills region of the Great Plains on the Saline River which wraps around the east, north, and west sides of the town in a meander. Fairport is roughly 14 miles (22 km) northwest of Russell, the county seat.

== Education ==
Fairport had a two year high school in connection with the common school until 1940 when Fairport High School joined Paradise High School.

== Transportation ==
Paradise-Fairport Road, an unpaved east–west county road, enters Fairport from the east, turns north through the town, then turns west and exits the town, becoming Fairport-Natoma Road.
