= Waldo Township, Kansas =

Township in Russell County, Kansas, U.S.

Waldo Township
- Township
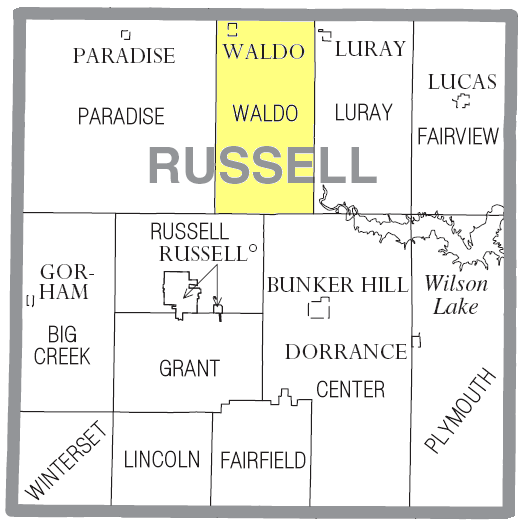
- Location of Waldo Township in Russell County
- Coordinates: 39°03′00″N 98°45′46″W
- Country: United States
- State: Kansas
- County: Russell
- Established: 1904

Government
  - Districts 2 and 3 County Commissioners: Jason Krug and John W. Strobel

Area
  - Total: 72.04 sq mi (186.6 km^{2})
  - Land: 71.90 sq mi (186.2 km^{2})
  - Water: 0.14 sq mi (0.36 km^{2}) 0.19%
- Elevation: 1,785 ft (544 m)

Population (2020)
  - Total: 83
  - Density: 1.2/sq mi (0.45/km^{2})
- Time zone: UTC-6 (Central (CST))
  - Summer (DST): UTC-5 (CDT)
- ZIP Code: 67626, 67648, 67649, 67665, 67673
- Area code: 785
- GNIS feature ID: 472463

Waldo Township is a township in Russell County, Kansas, United States. As of the 2020 United States census, it had a population of 83. It includes the town of Waldo.

== History ==
Waldo Township was organized from part of Fairview Township in 1904.

== Geography ==
The center of Waldo Township is located at 39°03′00″N 98°45′46″W (39.0500113, −98.7628561) at an elevation of 1,785 feet (544 m). The township lies in the Smoky Hills region of the Great Plains. The Saline River flows windingly east through the far southern part of the township. One of its tributaries, Paradise Creek, flows southeast through the southwestern part of the township to its confluence with the Saline. One of Paradise Creek's tributaries, Boswell Creek, runs east through the same area to its confluence with the creek. Another Saline tributary, Wolf Creek, flows southeast through the township's northeastern corner, met by its West Fork which runs generally east across the northern part of the township.

According to the United States Census Bureau, Waldo Township occupies an area of 72.04 square miles (186.6 km^{2}) of which 71.90 square miles (186.2 km^{2}) is land and 0.14 square miles (0.4 km^{2}) is water. Located in north-central Russell County, it includes the city of Waldo, which is located in the northwestern corner of the township, and it borders Osborne County's Valley and Jackson Townships to the north, Luray Township to the east, Center and Russell Townships to the south, and Paradise Township to the west.

== Demographics ==
Historical population
Census	Pop.	Note	%±
1910	804		—
1920	777		−3.4%
1930	704		−9.4%
1940	575		−18.3%
1950	461		−19.8%
1960	358		−22.3%
1970	232		−35.2%
1980	177		−23.7%
1990	128		−27.7%
2000	108		−15.6%
2010	78		−27.8%
2020	83		6.4%
U.S. Decennial Census

As of the 2020 census, there were 83 people and 36 households residing in the township. The population density was 1.2 people per square mile (0.46 people/km^{2}). There were 89 housing units. The racial makeup of the township was 92.8% White, 2.4% Asian, 1.2% from some other race, and 3.6% from two or more races. Hispanic or Latino of any race were 1.2% of the population.

There were 36 households: 77.8% were married couples living together, 8.3% had a male householder with no wife present, and 13.9% had a female householder with no husband present. The average family size was 1.93.

In the township, the population was spread out, with 0.0% under the age of 18, 10.8% from 18 to 24, 0.0% from 25 to 44, 15.7% from 45 to 64, and 48.2% who were 65 years of age or older. The median age was 70.5 years. For every 100 females, there were 100 males.

== Education ==
The majority of the township is split between Unified School District (USD) 399, based in Natoma to the west and Sylvan–Lucas USD 299, based in Sylvan Grove to the east. Portions of southern Waldo Township lie within Russell County USD 407, based in Russell.

== Transportation ==
U.S. Route 281 and Kansas Highway 18 (K-18) run concurrently east–west through the township's far northern portion, connecting to a network of mostly unpaved county roads laid out in a rough grid. A paved road, Bunker Hill-Luray Road, runs north–south through the southeastern part of the township, then turns east and exits four miles south of K-18.
