= Russell Township, Russell County, Kansas =

Township in Russell County, Kansas, U.S.

Russell Township
- Township
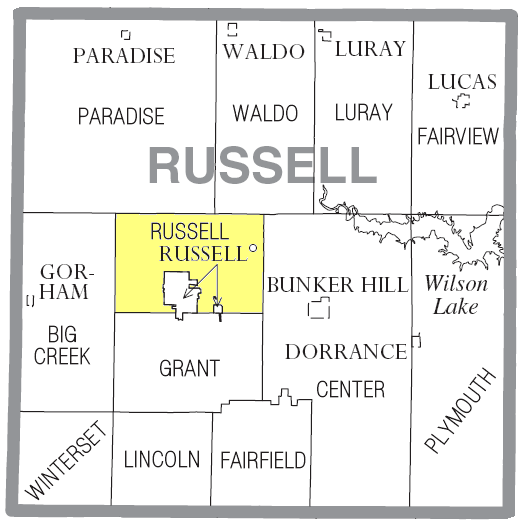
- Location of Russell Township in Russell County
- Coordinates: 38°54′53″N 98°50′42″W
- Country: United States
- State: Kansas
- County: Russell

Government
  - Districts 2, 3, 4, and 5 County Commissioners: Jason Krug, John W. Strobel, Dean Haselhorst, and Alan Kuntzsch

Area
  - Total: 49.21 sq mi (127.5 km^{2})
  - Land: 49.20 sq mi (127.4 km^{2})
  - Water: 0.01 sq mi (0.026 km^{2}) 0.02%
- Elevation: 1,844 ft (562 m)

Population (2020)
  - Total: 81
  - Density: 1.6/sq mi (0.64/km^{2})
- Time zone: UTC-6 (Central (CST))
  - Summer (DST): UTC-5 (CDT)
- ZIP Code: 67626, 67665
- Area code: 785
- GNIS feature ID: 475216

Russell Township is a township in Russell County, Kansas, United States. As of the 2020 United States census, it had a population of 81.

== History ==
Lincoln Township, including what would later become Grant Township, was organized from part of Russell Township in the 1880s. The city of Russell became independent of Russell Township in the 1940s and has since annexed portions of the township.

== Geography ==
The center of Russell Township is located at 38°54′53″N 98°50′42″W (38.9147336, −98.8450830) at an elevation of 1,844 feet (562 m). The township lies in the Smoky Hills region of the Great Plains. A short segment of the Saline River runs in and out of the far north-central part of the township. Salt Creek, a tributary of the river, flows east then north through the northwestern corner of the township. Another Saline tributary, Cedar Creek, runs north then east through the southeastern part of the township. Fossil Creek, a tributary of the Smoky Hill River, runs east-southeast through the southwestern corner of the township.

According to the United States Census Bureau, Russell Township comprises an area of 49.21 square miles (127.5 km^{2}) of which 49.20 (127.4 km^{2}) is land and 0.01 square miles (0.026 km^{2}) is water. Located in west-central Russell County, it contains no incorporated settlements. Russell Township borders the city of Russell on three sides: to the city's west, north, and east. The township also borders Paradise and Waldo Townships to the north, Center Township to the east, Grant Township to the south, and Big Creek Township to the west.

== Demographics ==
Historical population
Census	Pop.	Note	%±
1880	2,001		—
1890	1,159		−42.1%
1900	1,332		14.9%
1910	2,001		50.2%
1920	1,969		−1.6%
1930	2,659		35.0%
1940	5,273		98.3%
1950	316		−94.0%
1960	222		−29.7%
1970	204		−8.1%
1980	217		6.4%
1990	117		−46.1%
2000	89		−23.9%
2010	82		−7.9%
2020	81		−1.2%
U.S. Decennial Census

As of the 2020 census, there were 81 people and 20 households residing in the township. The population density was 1.6 people per square mile (0.62 people/km^{2}). There were 20 housing units. The racial makeup of the township was 95.0% White and 4.9% from two or more races. Hispanic or Latino of any race were 3.7% of the population.

There were 20 households: 20.0% were married couples living together, 80.0% had a male householder with no wife present, and 0.0% had a female householder with no husband present. The average family size was 1.75.

In the township, the population was spread out, with 0.0% under the age of 18, 0.0% from 18 to 24, 19.8% from 25 to 44, 8.6% from 45 to 64, and 0.0% who were 65 years of age or older. The median age was 41.7 years. For every 100 females, there were 475.0 males.

== Education ==
Russell Township lies within Russell County USD 407.

== Transportation ==
U.S. Route 281 runs north–south through Russell Township, connecting to a network of mostly unpaved county roads laid out in a rough grid pattern across the township. The old alignment of U.S. Route 40, now a paved county road, runs east–west through the southwestern part of the township. East of the city of Russell, it re-enters the township as a U.S. 40 business route, then exits to the southeast.

The Kansas Pacific line of the Union Pacific Railroad passes through the township, entering from the west and exiting to the southeast.
