= Paradise Township, Kansas =

Township in Russell County, Kansas, U.S.

Paradise Township
- Township
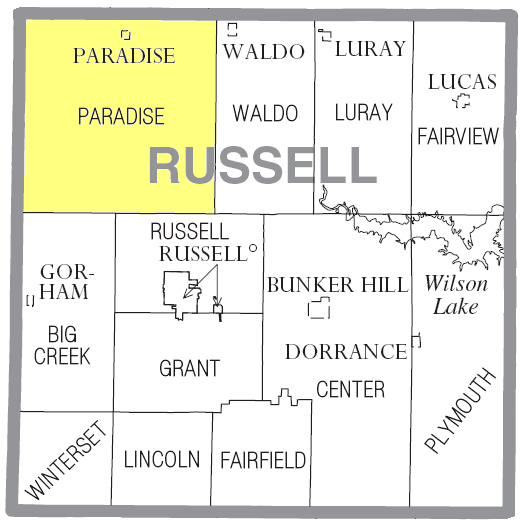
- Location of Paradise Township in Russell County
- Coordinates: 39°03′15″N 98°55′31″W
- Country: United States
- State: Kansas
- County: Russell

Government
  - District 2 County Commissioner: Jason Krug

Area
  - Total: 143.91 sq mi (372.7 km^{2})
  - Land: 143.68 sq mi (372.1 km^{2})
  - Water: 0.23 sq mi (0.60 km^{2}) 0.16%
- Elevation: 1,827 ft (557 m)

Population (2020)
  - Total: 138
  - Density: 0.960/sq mi (0.371/km^{2})
- Time zone: UTC-6 (Central (CST))
  - Summer (DST): UTC-5 (CDT)
- ZIP Code: 67640, 67651, 67658, 67665, 67673
- Area code: 785
- GNIS feature ID: 472453

Paradise Township is a township in Russell County, Kansas, United States. As of the 2020 United States census, it had a population of 138.

== Geography ==
The center of Paradise Township is located at 39°03′15″N 98°55′31″W (38.0541780, −98.9253637) at an elevation of 1,827 feet (557 m). The township lies in the Smoky Hills region of the Great Plains. The Saline River flows windingly southeast through the southern half of the township. One of its tributaries, Paradise Creek, runs southeast through the northeastern part of the township.

According to the United States Census Bureau, Paradise Township has an area of 143.91 square miles (372.7 km^{2}) of which 143.68 square miles (372.1 km^{2}) is land and 0.23 square miles (0.6 km^{2}) is water. Forming the northwest corner of Russell County, it includes the city of Paradise, located in the north-central part of the township, as well as the unincorporated community of Fairport, located at the midpoint of the township's western border. It borders Osborne County's Natoma, Liberty, and Valley Townships to the north, Waldo Township to the east, Russell and Big Creek Townships to the south, and Ellis County's Herzog Township to the west.

== Demographics ==
Historical population
Census	Pop.	Note	%±
1880	584		—
1890	637		9.1%
1900	580		−8.9%
1910	975		68.1%
1920	960		−1.5%
1930	1,026		6.9%
1940	925		−9.8%
1950	696		−24.8%
1960	490		−29.6%
1970	353		−28.0%
1980	271		−23.2%
1990	219		−19.2%
2000	169		−22.8%
2010	166		−1.8%
2020	138		−16.9%
U.S. Decennial Census

As of the 2020 census, there were 138 people and 60 households residing in the township. The population density was 0.960 people per square mile (0.371 people/km^{2}). There were 70 housing units. The racial makeup of the township was 92.0% White, 2.1% from some other race, and 5.8% from two or more races. Hispanic or Latino of any race were 4.3% of the population.

There were 60 households: 61.7% were married couples living together, 35.0% had a male householder with no wife present, and 3.3% had a female householder with no husband present. The average family size was 4.90.

In the township, the population was spread out, with 82.6% under the age of 19, 0.0% from 20 to 24, 26.8% from 25 to 44, 18.8% from 45 to 64, and 38.4% who were 65 years of age or older. The median age was 27.3 years. For every 100 females, there were 66.9 males. For every 100 females age 18 and over, there were 187.8 males age 18 and over.

== Education ==
The majority of the township lies within Unified School District (USD) 399, based in Natoma. Parts of southern Paradise Township lie in Russell County USD 407, based in Russell.

== Transportation ==
U.S. Route 281 runs north–south through the eastern part of Paradise Township to its junction with Kansas Highway 18 (K-18), an east–west route, one mile south of the Osborne County line. East of that junction, the two highways run concurrently east–west. K-18 enters the township from the north, running southeast, and turns east at the city of Paradise. A network of mostly unpaved county roads is laid out in a grid pattern across the township. Segments of two of these roads are paved: Gorham-Fairport Road, which runs north–south through the southwestern part of the township and both turns west and becomes unpaved roughly one mile east of Fairport, and Paradise Road, which zigzags south and west from the city of Paradise.
