= Forest Hill, Kansas =

- Location within the state of Kansas Forest Hill (the United States)
- Coordinates: 38°43′30″N 98°39′58″W
- Country: United States
- State: Kansas
- County: Russell
- Elevation: 1,860 ft (567 m)
- Time zone: UTC-6 (Central (CST))
  - Summer (DST): UTC-5 (CDT)
- GNIS feature ID: 482562

Forest Hill was a small settlement in Center Township, Russell County, Kansas, United States.

== History ==
Forest Hill was issued a post office in 1878. The post office was discontinued in 1895.

== See also ==
- List of ghost towns in Kansas
