= Luray Township, Kansas =

Township in Russell County, Kansas, U.S.

Luray Township
- Township
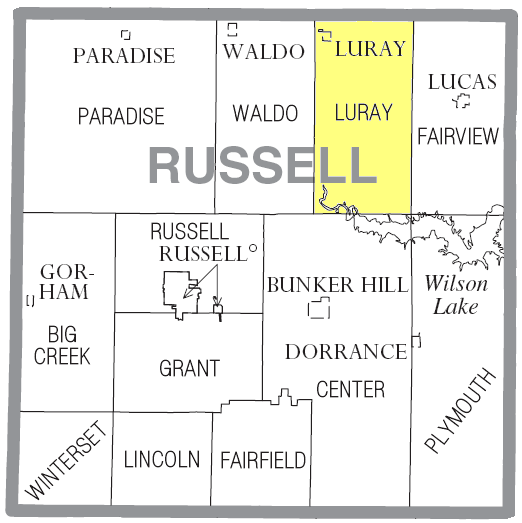
- Location of Luray Township in Russell County
- Coordinates: 39°03′00″N 98°38′31″W
- Country: United States
- State: Kansas
- County: Russell
- Established: 1906

Government
  - Districts 2 and 3 County Commissioners: Jason Krug and John W. Strobel

Area
  - Total: 71.23 sq mi (184.5 km^{2})
  - Land: 70.56 sq mi (182.7 km^{2})
  - Water: 0.67 sq mi (1.7 km^{2}) 0.94%
- Elevation: 1,594 ft (486 m)

Population (2020)
  - Total: 224
  - Density: 3.17/sq mi (1.23/km^{2})
- Time zone: UTC-6 (Central (CST))
  - Summer (DST): UTC-5 (CDT)
- ZIP Code: 67626, 67648, 67649
- Area code: 785
- GNIS feature ID: 472471

Luray Township is a township in Russell County, Kansas, United States. As of the 2020 United States census, it had a population of 224.

== History ==
Luray Township was organized from part of Fairview Township in 1906.

== Geography ==
The center of Luray Township is located at 39°03′00″N 98°38′31″W (39.0500111, −98.6420168) at an elevation of 1,594 feet (486 m). The township lies in the Smoky Hills region of the Great Plains. The Saline River flows windingly southeast through the southwestern corner of the township where it drains into Wilson Lake. One of the river's tributaries, Wolf Creek, flows east and southeast through the northern part of the township, fed by two tributaries of its own, Coon Creek and Fourmile Creek, which flow south.

According to the United States Census Bureau, Luray Township occupies an area of 71.23 square miles (184.5 km^{2}) of which 70.56 square miles (182.7 km^{2}) is land and 0.67 square miles (1.7 km^{2}) is water. Located in northeastern Russell County, it includes the city of Luray, which is located in the northwestern corner of the township, and it borders Osborne County's Jackson and Delhi Townships to the north, Fairview Township to the east, Plymouth Township to the southeast, Center Township to the south, and Waldo Township to the west.

== Demographics ==
Historical population
Census	Pop.	Note	%±
1910	956		—
1920	1,017		6.4%
1930	918		−9.7%
1940	754		−17.9%
1950	569		−24.5%
1960	485		−14.8%
1970	428		−11.8%
1980	373		−12.9%
1990	339		−9.1%
2000	270		−20.4%
2010	258		−4.4%
2020	224		−13.2%
U.S. Decennial Census

As of the 2020 census, there were 224 people and 74 households residing in the township. The population density was 3.17 people per square mile (1.22 people/km^{2}). There were 117 housing units. The racial makeup of the township was 95.1% White, 0.9% Asian, 0.4% Black or African American, and 3.6% from two or more races. Hispanic or Latino of any race were 1.3% of the population.

There were 74 households: 54.1% were married couples living together, 14.9% had a male householder with no wife present, and 23.0% had a female householder with no husband present. The average family size was 2.40.

In the township, the population was spread out, with 12.5% under the age of 19, 0.4% from 20 to 24, 8.0% from 25 to 44, 20.5% from 45 to 64, and 28.1% who were 65 years of age or older. The median age was 63.4 years. For every 100 females, there were 138.3 males. For every 100 females age 18 and over, there were 105.4 males age 18 and over.

== Education ==
Luray Township lies within Sylvan–Lucas USD 299, based in Sylvan Grove.

== Transportation ==
Kansas Highway 18 (K-18), an east–west route, enters the northern part of the township from the west, then turns southeast. U.S. Route 281, a north–south route, enters the township from the west concurrently with K-18, then turns north after one-half mile and exits the county. A network of mostly unpaved county roads is laid out in a rough grid pattern across the township. Bunker Hill-Luray Road, a paved north–south county road, enters the township from the west four miles south of K-18, then turns north, terminating in the city of Luray.
