= Hawley, Kansas =

- Location within the state of Kansas Hawley (the United States)
- Coordinates: 38°45′42″N 98°47′56″W
- Country: United States
- State: Kansas
- County: Russell
- Elevation: 1,791 ft (546 m)
- Time zone: UTC-6 (Central (CST))
  - Summer (DST): UTC-5 (CDT)
- GNIS feature ID: 481897

Hawley was a small settlement in Fairfield Township, Russell County, Kansas, United States.

== History ==
Hawley was issued a post office in 1880. The post office was discontinued in 1909. The population in 1910 was 33.

== See also ==
- List of ghost towns in Kansas
