= Winterset, Kansas =

- Location within the state of Kansas Winterset (the United States)
- Coordinates: 38°46′05″N 99°01′08″W
- Country: United States
- State: Kansas
- County: Russell
- Elevation: 1,854 ft (565 m)
- Time zone: UTC-6 (Central (CST))
  - Summer (DST): UTC-5 (CDT)
- GNIS feature ID: 482558

Winterset was a small settlement in Winterset Township, Russell County, Kansas, United States.

== History ==
Winterset was issued a post office in 1882. The post office was discontinued in 1890.

== See also ==
- List of ghost towns in Kansas
