= Fay, Kansas =

- Location within the state of Kansas Fay (the United States)
- Coordinates: 39°00′06″N 98°56′56″W
- Country: United States
- State: Kansas
- County: Russell
- Elevation: 1,690 ft (515 m)
- Time zone: UTC-6 (Central (CST))
  - Summer (DST): UTC-5 (CDT)
- GNIS feature ID: 481876

Fay was a small settlement in Paradise Township, Russell County, Kansas, United States.

== History ==
Fay was issued a post office in 1883. The post office was discontinued in 1908.

== See also ==
- List of ghost towns in Kansas
