= Paradise, Kansas =

City in Russell County, Kansas

- City
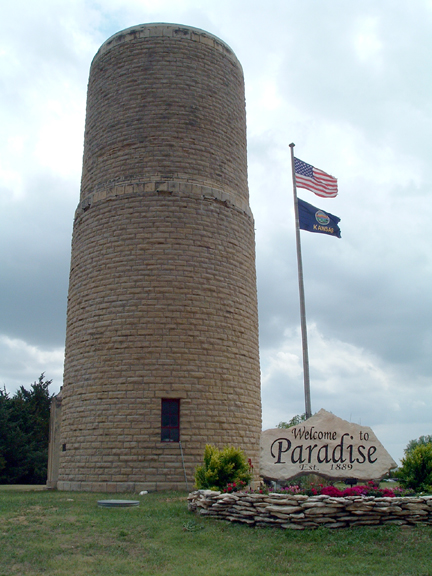
- Paradise watertower (2005)

- Location within Russell County and Kansas

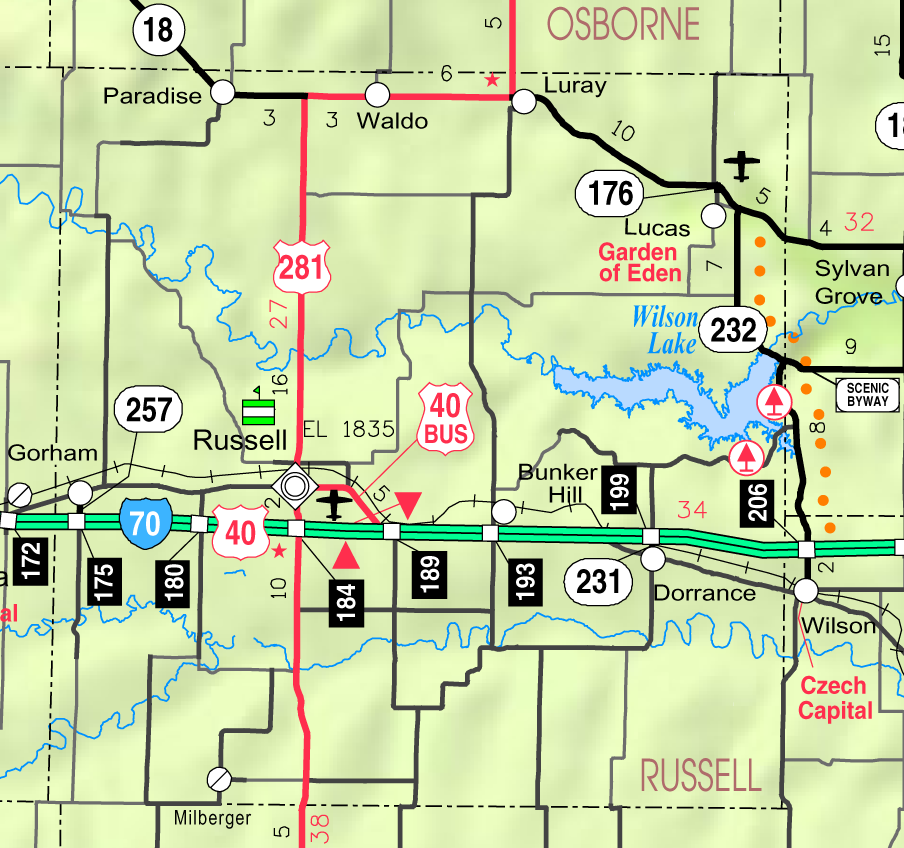
- KDOT map of Russell County (legend)
- Coordinates: 39°6′56″N 98°55′3″W
- Country: United States
- State: Kansas
- County: Russell
- Founded: 1887
- Incorporated: 1924
- Named for: paradise

Area
  - Total: 0.25 sq mi (0.64 km^{2})
  - Land: 0.25 sq mi (0.64 km^{2})
  - Water: 0 sq mi (0.00 km^{2})
- Elevation: 1,693 ft (516 m)

Population (2020)
  - Total: 35
  - Density: 140/sq mi (55/km^{2})
- Time zone: UTC-6 (CST)
  - Summer (DST): UTC-5 (CDT)
- ZIP Code: 67658
- Area code: 785
- FIPS code: 20-54325
- GNIS ID: 472527

Paradise is a city in Russell County, Kansas, United States. As of the 2020 census, the population of the city was 35.

== History ==
In 1859, a hunting party explored the area, including a small tributary of the Saline River which led them to a site abundant in water, timber, and bison. One of the hunters, James R. Mead, described the site as paradise, and the tributary subsequently became known as Paradise Creek. The first post office in the area opened under the name Paradise in 1875. In 1887, the Union Townsite Company established a town on the north side of the creek northwest of the post office, naming it Ivamar after Iva Marr, the daughter of a local rancher. The Paradise post office relocated to Ivamar the next year, but kept its name. As a result, the town came to be known by both names; in 1891, the Union Pacific Railroad listed its rail stop there as Paradise with Ivamar in parentheses. The community grew through the 1890s to include a school, downtown businesses, and railroad facilities, reaching a population of 200 by 1910. Ivamar incorporated in 1924 and finally changed its name to Paradise. The population of the community has gradually declined since the 1930s.

== Geography ==
Paradise is located in north-central Kansas 3.5 miles (5.6 km) west of U.S. Route 281 on Kansas Highway 18 (K-18), Paradise is 127 miles (204 km) northwest of Wichita, 233 miles (375 km) west of Kansas City, and 15 miles (24 km) north-northwest of Russell, the county seat.

Paradise sits on the north bank of Paradise Creek, a tributary of the Saline River, in the Smoky Hills region of the Great Plains. Eagle Creek, a tributary of Paradise Creek, flows south along the community's eastern side.

According to the United States Census Bureau, the city has a total area of 0.25 square miles (0.65 km^{2}), all land.

== Demographics ==
Historical population
Census	Pop.	Note	%±
1930	178		—
1940	161		−9.6%
1950	145		−9.9%
1960	134		−7.6%
1970	145		8.2%
1980	89		−38.6%
1990	66		−25.8%
2000	64		−3.0%
2010	49		−23.4%
2020	35		−28.6%
U.S. Decennial Census

=== 2010 census ===
As of the 2010 census, there were 49 people, 22 households, and 13 families residing in the city. The population density was 163.3 inhabitants per square mile (63.1/km^{2}). There were 27 housing units at an average density of 90.0 per square mile (34.7/km^{2}). The racial makeup of the city was 100.0% White. Hispanics and Latinos of any race were 0.0% of the population.

There were 22 households, of which 27.3% had children under the age of 18 living with them, 54.5% were married couples living together, 0.0% had a male householder with no wife present, 4.5% had a female householder with no husband present, and 40.9% were non-families. 36.4% of all households were made up of individuals, and 27.2% had someone living alone who was 65 years of age or older. The average household size was 2.23, and the average family size was 2.92.

In the city, the population was spread out, with 26.5% under the age of 18, 0.0% from 18 to 24, 20.4% from 25 to 44, 28.6% from 45 to 64, and 24.5% who were 65 years of age or older. The median age was 47.5 years. For every 100 females, there were 81.5 males. For every 100 females age 18 and over, there were 80 males age 18 and over.

The median income for a household in the city was $41,250, and the median income for a family was $49,167. Males had a median income of $19,167 versus $40,833 for females. The per capita income for the city was $16,216. There were 7.1% of families and 4.0% of the population living below the poverty line, including 5.6% of those under age 18 and none of those age 65 or over.

=== 2000 census ===
As of the census of 2000, there were 64 people, 28 households, and 16 families residing in the city. The population density was 251.8 inhabitants per square mile (97.2/km^{2}). There were 36 housing units at an average density of 141.6 per square mile (54.7/km^{2}). The racial makeup of the city was 96.88% White, 1.56% Native American, and 1.56% from two or more races. Hispanic or Latino of any race were 1.56% of the population.

There were 28 households, out of which 35.7% had children under the age of 18 living with them, 53.6% were married couples living together, 7.1% had a female householder with no husband present, and 39.3% were non-families. 39.3% of all households were made up of individuals, and 21.4% had someone living alone who was 65 years of age or older. The average household size was 2.29 and the average family size was 3.12.

In the city, the population was spread out, with 26.6% under the age of 18, 7.8% from 18 to 24, 25.0% from 25 to 44, 21.9% from 45 to 64, and 18.8% who were 65 years of age or older. The median age was 42 years. For every 100 females, there were 106.5 males. For every 100 females age 18 and over, there were 88.0 males.

== Economy ==
As of 2012, 79.3% of the population over the age of 16 was in the labor force. 0.0% was in the armed forces, and 79.3% was in the civilian labor force with 75.9% being employed and 3.4% unemployed. The composition, by occupation, of the employed civilian labor force was: 50.0% in sales and office occupations; 18.2% in management, business, science, and arts; 13.6% in natural resources, construction, and maintenance; 9.1% in production, transportation, and material moving; and 9.1% in service occupations. The three industries employing the largest percentages of the working civilian labor force were: public administration (45.5%); finance and insurance, and real estate and rental and leasing (27.3%); and other services, except public administration (18.2%).

The cost of living in Paradise is relatively low; compared to a U.S. average of 100, the cost of living index for the community is 76.9. As of 2012, the median home value in the city was $16,900, and the median selected monthly owner cost was $510 for housing units without a mortgage.

== Government ==
Paradise is a city of the third class with a mayor-council form of government. The city council consists of five members, and it meets on the second Wednesday of each month.

Paradise lies within Kansas's 1st U.S. Congressional District. For the purposes of representation in the Kansas Legislature, the city is located in the 36th district of the Kansas Senate and the 109th district of the Kansas House of Representatives.

== Education ==
The community is served by Natoma–Paradise–Waldo USD 399 public school district, which is located in Natoma.

Paradise High School closed in 1974 after Paradise and Waldo combined school districts with Natoma. The Paradise school mascot was Paradise Pirates. The Paradise Pirates won the Kansas State High School boys class 1A Track & Field championship in 1971.

== Infrastructure ==
=== Transportation ===
K-18, an east-west route, approaches Paradise from the northwest, then turns east north of the city. Paradise Road, a paved county road, enters the city from the south.

=== Utilities ===
Western Electric provides electricity to local residents. Gorham Telephone provides landline telephone service and offers cable television and internet access. Most residents use privately stored propane for heating fuel.

== Media ==
Paradise is in the Wichita-Hutchinson, Kansas television market.

== Culture ==
=== Architecture ===
Paradise is home to several unique structures that were constructed from Post Rock Limestone. Early settlers to the area discovered that while there was a shortage of timber, limestone was plentiful, and therefore it was commonly used as a building material. It was also commonly used for fence posts. The watertower and the former Kennedy Hotel were recently added to the National Register of Historic Places and featured in an article in the Salina Journal.

== Gallery ==
Businesses in downtown Paradise (2007)

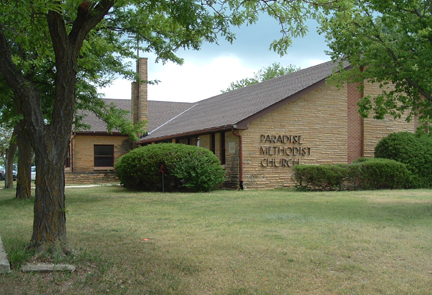
Paradise United Methodist Church (2005)
