= Grant Township, Russell County, Kansas =

Township in Russell County, Kansas, U.S.

Grant Township
- Township
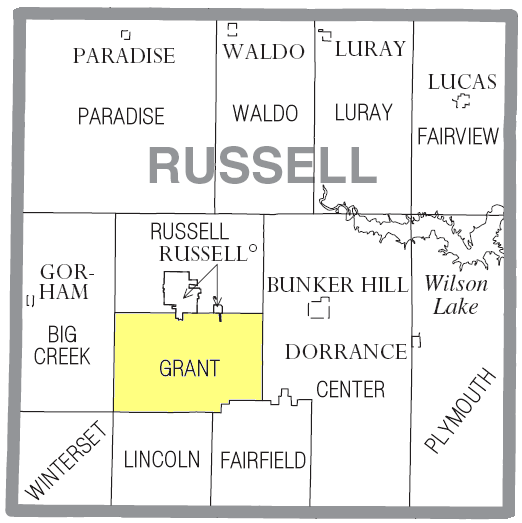
- Location of Grant Township in Russell County
- Coordinates: 38°49′38″N 98°50′41″W
- Country: United States
- State: Kansas
- County: Russell
- Established: 1907

Government
  - District 1 County Commissioner: Steve Reinhardt

Area
  - Total: 52.16 sq mi (135.1 km^{2})
  - Land: 52.06 sq mi (134.8 km^{2})
  - Water: 0.1 sq mi (0.26 km^{2}) 0.19%
- Elevation: 1,811 ft (552 m)

Population (2020)
  - Total: 177
  - Density: 3.40/sq mi (1.31/km^{2})
- Time zone: UTC-6 (Central (CST))
  - Summer (DST): UTC-5 (CDT)
- ZIP Code: 67665
- Area code: 785
- GNIS ID: 475309

Grant Township is a township in Russell County, Kansas, United States. As of the 2020 United States census, it had a population of 177.

== History ==
Grant Township was organized from part of Lincoln Township in 1907. In the decades since, the city of Russell has expanded and annexed portions of Grant Township.

== Geography ==
The center of Grant Township is located at 38°49′38″N 98°50′41″W (38.8272336, −98.8448058) at an elevation of 1,811 feet (552 m). The township lies in the Smoky Hills region of the Great Plains. The Smoky Hill River runs windingly east in and out of the township, back and forth across the township's southern border, and then forms the eastern portion of the border. Fossil Creek, a tributary of the river, enters the township from the northwest and runs east to immediately south of Russell where it has been dammed to form a small reservoir, Fossil Lake. From the lake, the creek flows southeast, then south across the township to the river. The confluence of the river and another of its tributaries, Big Creek, is located in the far southwestern corner of the township.

According to the United States Census Bureau, Grant Township comprises an area of 52.16 square miles (135.1 km^{2}) of which 52.06 square miles (134.8 km^{2}) is land and 0.1 square miles (0.26 km^{2}) is water. Located in central Russell County, it contains no incorporated settlements and borders the city of Russell and Russell Township to the north, Center Township to the east, Fairfield and Lincoln Townships to the south, Winterset Township to the southwest, and Big Creek Township to the west.

== Demographics ==
Historical population
Census	Pop.	Note	%±
1910	553		—
1920	513		−7.2%
1930	481		−6.2%
1940	510		6.0%
1950	514		0.8%
1960	338		−34.2%
1970	234		−30.8%
1980	211		−9.8%
1990	178		−15.6%
2000	159		−10.7%
2010	186		17.0%
2020	177		−4.8%
U.S. Decennial Census

As of the 2020 census, there were 177 people and 64 households residing in the township. The population density was 3.4 people per square mile (1.3 people/km^{2}). There were 64 housing units. The racial makeup of the township was 97.7% White, 0.6% African American, 0.6% from other races, and 1.1% from two or more races. Hispanic or Latino of any race were 1.1% of the population.

There were 64 households: 57.8% were married couples living together, 42.2% had a male householder with no wife present, and 0% had a female householder with no husband present. The average family size was 3.84.

In the township, the population was spread out, with 25.4% under the age of 19, 0.0% from 20 to 24, 0.0% from 25 to 44, 81.9% from 45 to 64, and 0.0% who were 65 years of age or older. The median age was 51.4 years. For every 100 females, there were 179.4 males.

== Education ==
Grant Township lies within Russell County USD 407.

== Transportation ==
Interstate 70 and U.S. Route 40 run concurrently east–west through the far northern part of the township. U.S. Route 281 runs north–south through the central part of the township, connecting to a network of mostly unpaved county roads laid out in a rough grid pattern across the township. A U.S. 40 business route runs southeast into the northeastern corner of the township, terminating at its interchange with I-70. Pioneer Road, a paved north–south county road, runs straight south from that interchange through the township. Immediately south of the interchange, the old alignment of U.S. 40 runs east from Pioneer Road, parallel to I-70. The north–south Balta-Galatia Road forms the township's western border. Another paved county road, the east–west 4 Corners Road, runs east from U.S. 281 in the southern part of the township.

The Kansas Pacific line of the Union Pacific Railroad runs parallel to I-70 and the U.S. 40 business route through the northeastern corner of the township.
