= Jack, Kansas =

- Location within the state of Kansas Jack (the United States)
- Coordinates: 39°05′22″N 98°52′41″W
- Country: United States
- State: Kansas
- County: Russell
- Elevation: 1,663 ft (507 m)
- Time zone: UTC-6 (Central (CST))
  - Summer (DST): UTC-5 (CDT)
- GNIS feature ID: 482554

Jack was a small settlement in Paradise Township, Russell County, Kansas, United States.

== History ==
Jack was issued a post office in 1883. The post office was discontinued in 1888.

== See also ==
- List of ghost towns in Kansas
