= Kennebec, Kansas =

- Location within the state of Kansas Kennebec (the United States)
- Coordinates: 38°46′07″N 98°51′21″W
- Country: United States
- State: Kansas
- County: Russell
- Elevation: 1,752 ft (534 m)
- Time zone: UTC-6 (Central (CST))
  - Summer (DST): UTC-5 (CDT)
- GNIS feature ID: 482559

Kennebec was a small settlement in Lincoln Township, Russell County, Kansas, United States.

== History ==
Kennebec was issued a post office in 1874. The post office was discontinued in 1891.

== See also ==
- List of ghost towns in Kansas
