= Center Township, Russell County, Kansas =

Township in Russell County, Kansas, U.S.

Center Township
- Township
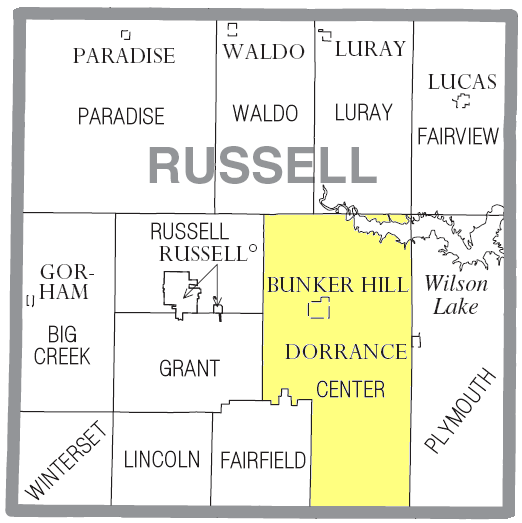
- Location of Center Township in Russell County
- Coordinates: 38°49′39″N 98°40′43″W
- Country: United States
- State: Kansas
- County: Russell

Government
  - District 5 County Commissioner: Alan Kuntzsch

Area
  - Total: 142.07 sq mi (368.0 km^{2})
  - Land: 138.65 sq mi (359.1 km^{2})
  - Water: 3.42 sq mi (8.9 km^{2}) 2.41%
- Elevation: 1,742 ft (531 m)

Population (2020)
  - Total: 220
  - Density: 1.6/sq mi (0.61/km^{2})
- Time zone: UTC-6 (Central (CST))
  - Summer (DST): UTC-5 (CDT)
- ZIP Code: 67626, 67634, 67648, 67665
- Area code: 785
- GNIS ID: 475226

Center Township is a township in Russell County, Kansas, United States. As of the 2020 United States census, it had a population of 220.

== Geography ==
The center of Center Township is located at 38°49′39″N 98°40′43″W (38.8275111, −98.6786868) at an elevation of 1,742 feet (531 m). The township lies in the Smoky Hills region of the Great Plains. The western third of Wilson Lake lies in northeastern Center Township. Elm Creek, which drains into the lake, flows north through the northeastern part of the township. Cedar Creek, a tributary of the Saline River, runs northeastward through the northwestern part of the township. In the south, the Smoky Hill River flows generally eastward through the township, joined by one of its tributaries, Beaver Creek, which runs northeastward.

According to the United States Census Bureau, Center Township has an area of 142.07 square miles (368.0 km^{2}) of which 138.65 square miles (359.1 km^{2}) is land and 3.42 square miles (8.9 km^{2}) is water. Located in east-central Russell County, it includes the city of Bunker Hill, which is located in the northwestern part of the township, and it borders Waldo and Luray Townships to the north, Fairview Township to the northeast, Plymouth Township to the east, Barton County's Beaver and Union Townships to the south, Fairfield Township to the southwest, and Grant and Russell Townships to the west.

== Demographics ==
Historical population
| Census | Pop. | Note | %± |
|---|---|---|---|
| 1880 | 1,619 | | — |
| 1890 | 1,170 | | −27.7% |
| 1900 | 1,133 | | −3.2% |
| 1910 | 1,442 | | 27.3% |
| 1920 | 1,372 | | −4.9% |
| 1930 | 1,248 | | −9.0% |
| 1940 | 1,098 | | −12.0% |
| 1950 | 869 | | −20.9% |
| 1960 | 623 | | −28.3% |
| 1970 | 506 | | −18.8% |
| 1980 | 350 | | −30.8% |
| 1990 | 359 | | 2.6% |
| 2000 | 255 | | −29.0% |
| 2010 | 221 | | −13.3% |
| 2020 | 220 | | −0.5% |
U.S. Decennial Census

As of the 2020 census, there were 220 people and 178 households in the township. The population density was 1.6 people per square mile (0.62 people/km^{2}). There were 211 housing units. The racial makeup of the township was 96.8% White, 0.9% American Indian and Alaska Native, 0.9% from some other race, and 1.4% from two or more races. Hispanic or Latino of any race were 0.9% of the population.

There were 178 households, 31.5% were married couples living together, 22.5% had a male householder with no wife present, and 39.3% had a female householder with no husband present. The average household size was 2.72.

In the township, the population was spread out, with 19.5% under the age of 19, 15.5% from 20 to 24, 8.2% from 25 to 44, 43.2% from 45 to 64, and 53.6% who were 65 years of age or older. The median age was 56.9 years. For every 100 females, there were 81.2 males. For every 100 females age 19 and over, there were 75.5 males age 19 and over.

== Education ==
Center Township lies within Russell County USD 407.

== Transportation ==
Interstate 70 and U.S. Route 40 run concurrently east–west through Center Township, interchanging with Bunker Hill-Luray Road, a paved north–south county road, less than one mile south of Bunker Hill. South of I-70, Bunker Hill-Luray Road becomes Bunker Hill-Hoisington Road. A network of mostly unpaved county roads is laid out across the township in a rough grid pattern. The old alignment of U.S. 40, now a paved county road, runs east–west immediately south of and parallel to I-70. North of Bunker Hill, Anspaugh Road, an unpaved county road, runs east then northeast toward Wilson Lake, turning into the paved Shoreline Road, which runs southeast and east, roughly parallel to the southern shoreline of the lake. Less than a mile north of the Smoky Hill River, 4 Corners Road, a paved east–west road, enters the county from the west and terminates at its junction with Bunker Hill-Hoisington Road. Less than a mile south of the Smoky Hill, Lincoln Lane, another paved road, runs east–west through the township.

The Kansas Pacific line of the Union Pacific Railroad runs windingly east through Bunker Hill and the northern part of the township.
