= Milberger, Kansas =

Unincorporated community in Russell County, Kansas

- Unincorporated community
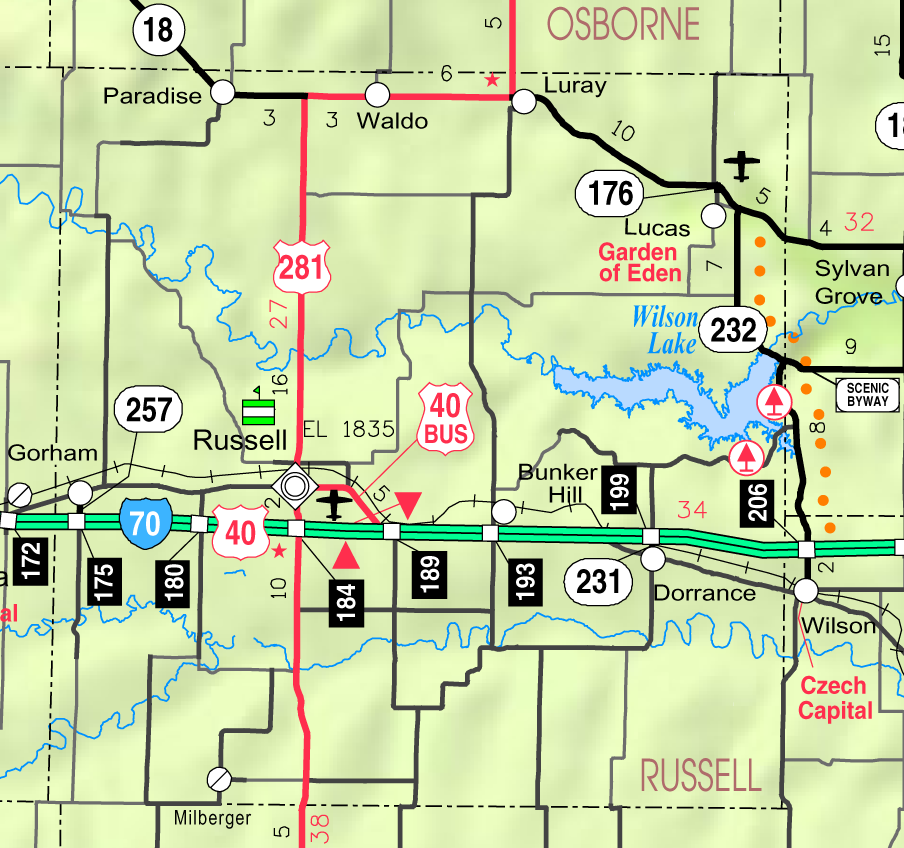
- KDOT map of Russell County (legend)

- Location within Kansas Location within the United States
- Coordinates: 38°42′43″N 98°54′44″W
- Country: United States
- State: Kansas
- County: Russell
- Founded: 1884
- Elevation: 1,857 ft (566 m)
- Time zone: UTC-6 (CST)
  - Summer (DST): UTC-5 (CDT)
- ZIP Code: 67665
- Area code: 620
- FIPS code: 20-46475
- GNIS ID: 475411

Milberger is an unincorporated community in Lincoln Township, Russell County, Kansas, United States. It is located approximately 10.5 miles south of Russell and 3.5 miles west of U.S. Route 281 on Michaelis Road.

== History ==
Volga German colonists founded Milberger in 1884. Predominantly Lutheran, they established several churches in and around the community, most of which closed by 1980. A rural post office operated in Milberger from 1903 to 1911.

== Geography ==
Milberger lies on the west side of Landon Creek, roughly 4.5 miles (7 km) south of the Smoky Hill River in the Smoky Hills region of the Great Plains. Milberger is approximately 3.5 miles (6 km) west of U.S. Route 281, 10.5 miles (17 km) south of Interstate 70 and 12 miles (20 km) south-southwest of Russell, the county seat.

== Economy ==
- Radke Implement

== Education ==
The community is served by Russell County USD 407 public school district.

== Transportation ==
Milberger lies at the intersection of 182nd Street, a paved county road which runs north–south, and Michaelis Road, an unpaved county road which runs east–west.
