= Mary Ann Bickerdyke =

American nurse and philanthropist (1817–1901)

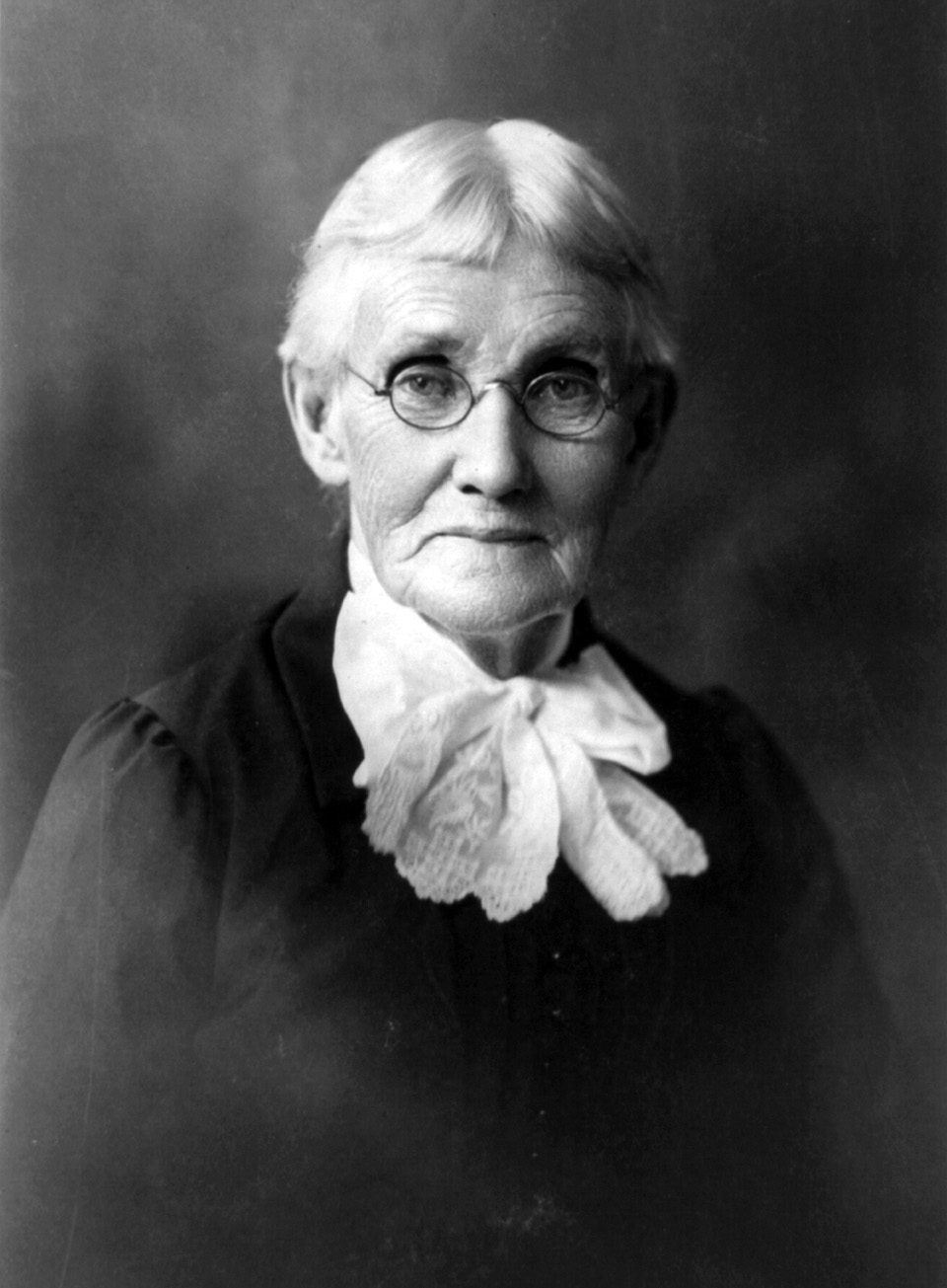
- Mary Ann Bickerdyke in 1898
- Born: Mary Ann Ball; July 19, 1817; Knox County, Ohio
- Died: November 8, 1901 (aged 84); Bunker Hill, Kansas
- Burial place: Galesburg, Illinois
- Spouse: Robert Bickerdyke
- Relatives: Two sons
- Military career
- Service years: 1861–1865
- Nickname: "Mother" Bickerdyke
- Other work: lawyer, advocate for veterans

Mary Ann Bickerdyke (July 19, 1817 – November 8, 1901), also known as Mother Bickerdyke, was a hospital administrator for Union soldiers during the American Civil War and a lifelong advocate for veterans. She was responsible for establishing 300 field hospitals during the war and served as a lawyer assisting veterans and their families with obtaining pensions after the war.

== Early life ==
Mary Ann Ball was born on July 19, 1817, in Knox County, Ohio, to Hiram and Annie Rodgers Ball. She is cited as one of the first women who attended Oberlin College in Ohio, but official records show no proof of attendance. In 1847, she married Robert Bickerdyke, who died in 1859, two years before the Civil War. Together, the Bickerdykes had two sons.

She later moved to Galesburg, Illinois, where she worked as botanic physician and primarily worked with alternative medicines using herbs and plants. Bickerdyke began to attend the Congregational Church in Galesburg shortly after she became a widow.

== Civil War service ==
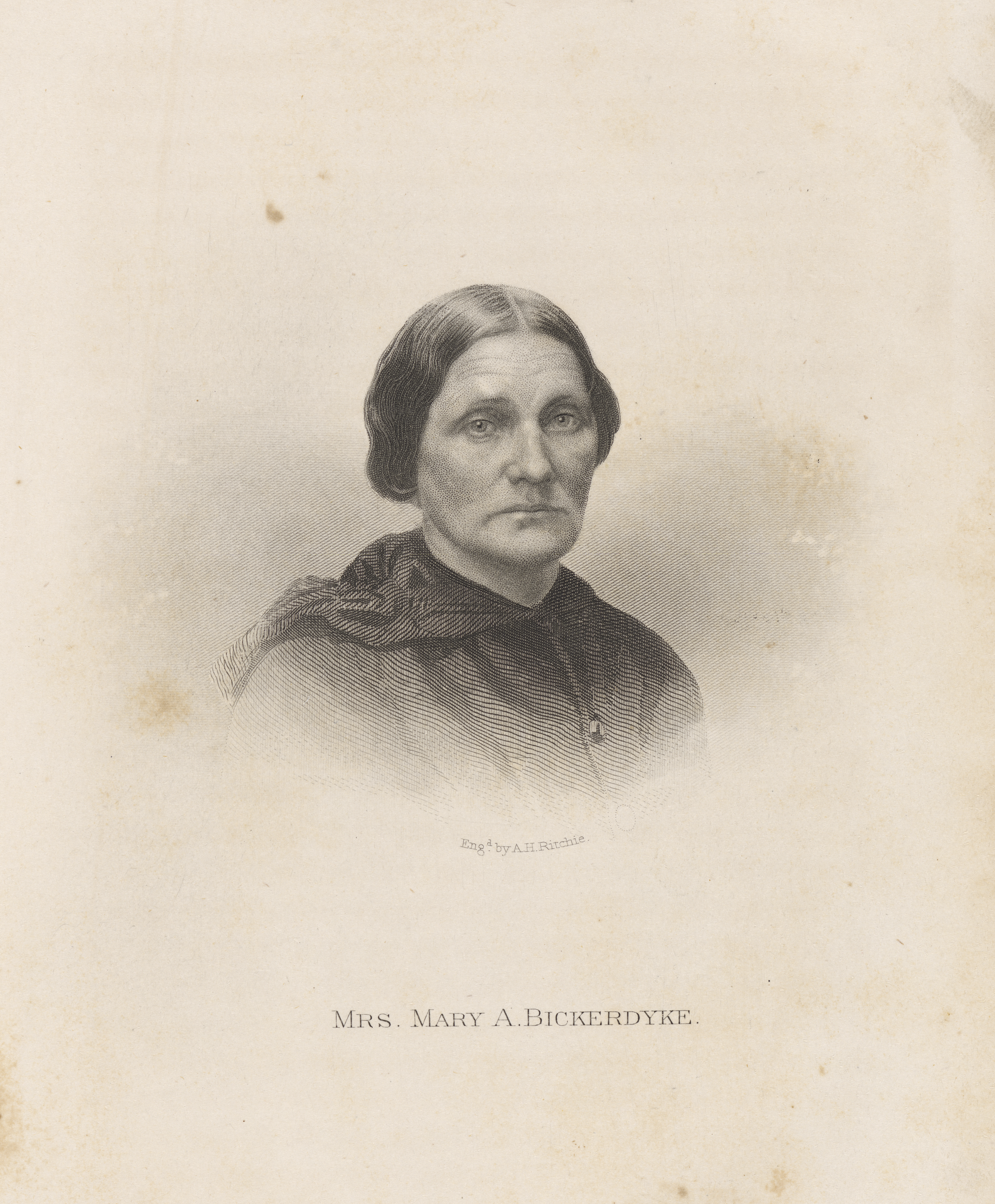
An engraving of Bickerdyke by Alexander Hay Ritchie, c. 1867

Mary Bickerdyke served in the Civil War from June 9, 1861, to March 20, 1865, working in a total of nineteen battles. Bickerdyke was described as a determined nurse who did not let anyone stand in the way of her duties. Her patients, the enlisted soldiers, referred to her as "Mother" Bickerdyke because of her caring nature. When a surgeon questioned her authority to take some action, she replied, "On the authority of Lord God Almighty; have you anything that outranks that?" In fact, her authority came from her reputation with the Sanitary Commission and her popularity with the enlisted men.

Dr. Woodward, a surgeon with the 22nd Illinois Infantry and a friend of Bickerdyke's, wrote home about the filthy, chaotic military hospitals at Cairo, Illinois. The letter was read aloud in their church and Galesburg's citizens collected $500 worth of supplies and selected Bickerdyke to deliver them (no one else would go). After meeting Mary Livermore, she was appointed a field agent for the Northwestern branch of the Sanitary Commission. Livermore also helped Bickerdyke find care for her two sons in Beloit, Wisconsin, while she was in the field with the army during the later part of the war. Her sons complained about living in Beloit. She stayed in Cairo as a nurse, and while there, she organized the hospitals and gained Grant's appreciation. Grant endorsed her efforts and detailed soldiers to her hospital train, and when his army moved down the Mississippi, Bickerdyke went, too, setting up hospitals where they were needed. Bickerdyke became a matron of the hospital in only five months.

She later joined a field hospital at Fort Donelson, working alongside Mary J. Safford. Bickerdyke cites Fort Donelson, specifically February 15 and 16, as the first battle she witnessed. At Fort Donelson, she realized that laundry services were lacking in the field hospitals. She packed up the soiled clothes and bedding that had been used by the men, added disinfectants, and sent it on a steamer bound for Pittsburg Landing to be cleaned by the Chicago Sanitary Commission. She also requested that her colleagues in Chicago send washing machines, portable kettles, and mangles. She then organized former enslaved workers (some of whom had escaped from enslavement) to provide laundry services for the hospitals she set up in the field.

After serving at Fort Donelson, she was appointed matron at Gayoso Block Hospital in Memphis. Gayoso had 900 patients, including 400 Native Americans. As at her other hospitals, "Mother" Bickerdyke employed former enslaved workers at Gayoso. She had left Gayoso to run errands and returned to find the medical director had sent those workers away. She left for dinner but did not return right away. Rather, she visited General Hurlbut's headquarters. She was given written authority to keep her staff until such time as Hurlbut himself revoked the order. She also set about acquiring cows and hens to provide dairy products for the hospital. General Hurlbut set aside President's Island for their pasture and hospital workers cared for the animals.

Bickerdyke also worked closely with Eliza Emily Chappell Porter of Chicago's Northwestern branch of the United States Sanitary Commission. She later worked on the first hospital boat. During the war, she became chief of nursing under the command of General Ulysses S. Grant, and served at the Battle of Vicksburg. As chief of nursing, Bickerdyke sometimes deliberately ignored military procedure, and when Grant's staff complained about her behavior, Union Gen. William T. Sherman reportedly threw up his hands and exclaimed, "She outranks me. I can't do a thing in the world." Sherman acknowledged that she was "one of his best generals" and other officers referred to her as the "Brigadier Commanding Hospitals." Sherman was especially fond of this volunteer nurse, who followed the western armies. Bickerdyke held the favor of both General Sherman and General Grant, who often provided her whatever she requested of them.

On October 27, 1863, Bickerdyke reported to Chattanooga and was witness to the battle of Lookout Mountain, nicknamed "the battle above the clouds." "I watched the dreadful combat until the clouds hid all from view," she wrote in a letter to Mary Holland, "In fancy I can hear General Hooker's artillery now." Bickerdyke set up the field hospital of the Fifteenth Army Corps for the Battle of Missionary Ridge, where she was the only female attendant for four weeks. Part of her work during this campaign was to collect personal items of soldiers killed in battle and return them to the soldiers' homes. On the march to capture Atlanta, Georgia, despite General Sherman's orders to inflict "all the damage you can against [the enemy's] war resource," Bickerdyke worked to build hospitals for Confederate soldiers.

By the end of the war, with the help of the U.S. Sanitary Commission, Mother Bickerdyke had built 300 hospitals and aided the wounded on 19 battlefields including the Battle of Shiloh and Sherman's March to the Sea. "Mother" Bickerdyke was so loved by the army that the soldiers would cheer her when she appeared. At Sherman's request, she rode at the head of the XV Corps in the Grand Review of the Armies in Washington at the end of the war.

== After the War ==
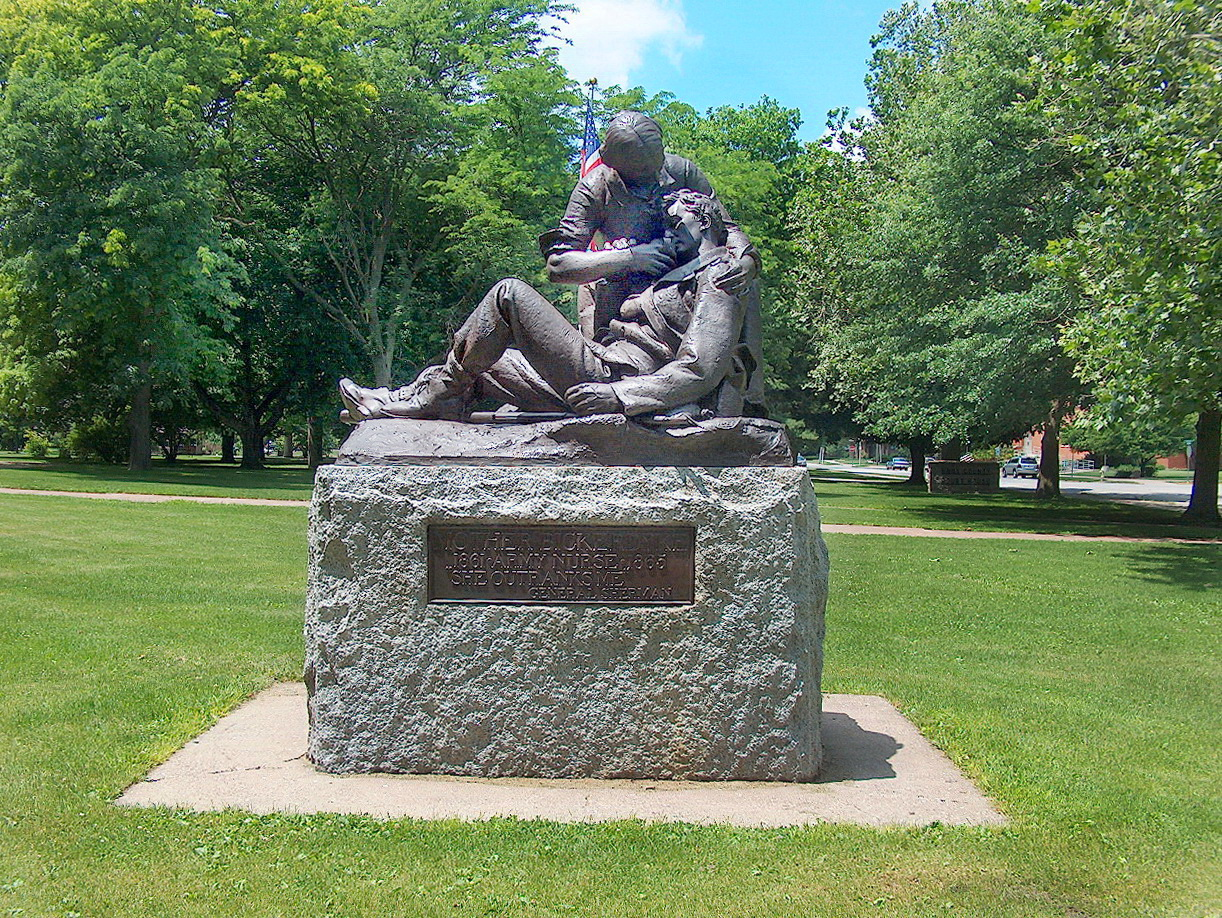
Bickerdyke Memorial in Galesburg, Illinois.

After the war ended, Bickerdyke was employed in several domains. She worked at the Home for the Friendless in Chicago, Illinois in 1866. With the aid of Colonel Charles Hammond, who was president of the Chicago, Burlington, and Quincy Railroad, she helped fifty veterans' families move to Salina, Kansas, as homesteaders. She ran a hotel there with the aid of General Sherman. Originally known as the Salina Dining Hall, it came to be called the Bickerdyke House. Later, she became an attorney, helping Union veterans with legal problems, including obtaining pensions.

General Logan helped her get a job in the San Francisco Mint. She also worked for the Salvation Army there. While in California, she was elected as the first president of Lyon Women's Relief Corps, No. 6 of Oakland, California. She declined, but is on their membership rolls as a charter member.

Bickerdyke received a special pension of $25 a month from Congress after Mary Livermore lobbied on her behalf. This special bill was introduced by Representative Long of Massachusetts. Generals Grant, Sherman, Pope, and Long testified on it. The bill passed on May 9, 1886.

Bickerdyke retired to Bunker Hill, Kansas, to live with her son. In 1901, she died peacefully after a minor stroke and was buried in Galesburg.

== Legacy ==
Bickerdyke is featured in a memoir of the war, written by Mary Livermore and published in 1887, entitled My Story of the War. Livermore was an official in the U.S. Sanitation Commission.

Clara Barton wrote a poem entitled "The Women Who Went to the Field" that honored Bickerdyke, Cornelia Hancock, Dorothea Dix, Mary Livermore, and Annie Etheridge.

Statues of her have been erected in Galesburg, Illinois and in Mount Vernon, Ohio. The United States government recognized her military achievements with a hospital ship and liberty ship named the SS Mary Bickerdyke launched in October 1943.

The Seminary/Kellogg Street overpass in Galesburg, Illinois opened on November 30, 2014, and is officially named "Bickerdyke Bridge".
