= Bunker Hill, Kansas =

City in Russell County, Kansas, US

- City
- Location within Russell County and Kansas

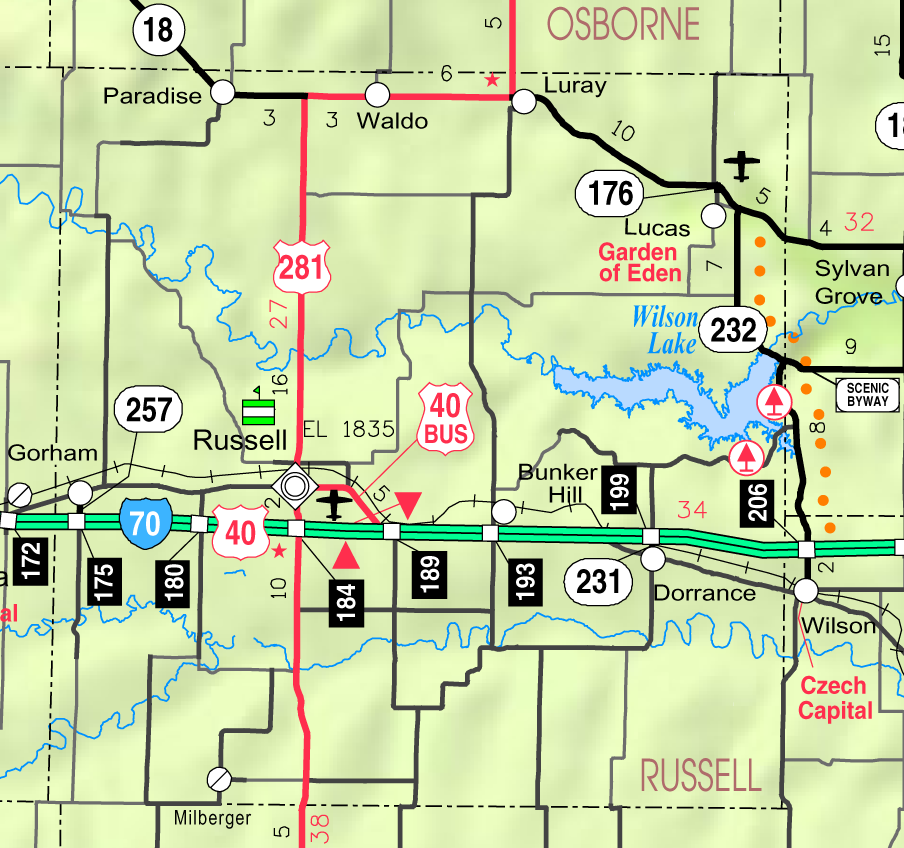
- KDOT map of Russell County (legend)
- Coordinates: 38°52′29″N 98°42′10″W
- Country: United States
- State: Kansas
- County: Russell
- Founded: 1871
- Incorporated: 1886
- Named for: 1860s mail station

Area
  - Total: 1.39 sq mi (3.59 km^{2})
  - Land: 1.39 sq mi (3.59 km^{2})
  - Water: 0 sq mi (0.00 km^{2})
- Elevation: 1,860 ft (570 m)

Population (2020)
  - Total: 103
  - Density: 74.3/sq mi (28.7/km^{2})
- Time zone: UTC-6 (CST)
  - Summer (DST): UTC-5 (CDT)
- ZIP Code: 67626
- Area code: 785
- FIPS code: 20-09225
- GNIS ID: 475228

Bunker Hill is a city in Russell County, Kansas, United States. As of the 2020 census, the population of the city was 103.

== History ==
J. B. Corbett and Valentine Harbaugh, leaders of a colony from Ohio, founded Bunker Hill at a site on the Kansas Pacific Railway in the summer of 1871. The settlement received its name from a Butterfield Overland Despatch station, built in 1865, that had preceded it on the site. County commissioners declared Bunker Hill the county seat in 1872, but, two years later, a popular vote moved the seat to nearby Russell. Many Bunker Hill residents moved with it, stunting the growth and development of the town. By 1883, a small business community emerged, including a hotel, flour mill, and several shops.

== Geography ==
Bunker Hill is located in north-central Kansas, 108 miles (174 km) northwest of Wichita and 221 miles (356 km) west of Kansas City. Located 1 mile (1.6 km) north of Interstate 70, it is roughly 8 miles (13 km) east of Russell, the county seat.

The community lies in the Smoky Hills region of the Great Plains, approximately 5 miles (8.0 km) north of the Smoky Hill River and 7 miles (11 km) south of the Saline River. Wilson Lake lies 6 miles (9.7 km) to the northeast.

According to the United States Census Bureau, the city has a total area of 1.38 square miles (3.57 km^{2}), all land.

=== Climate ===
The climate in this area is characterized by hot, humid summers and generally mild to cool winters. According to the Köppen Climate Classification system, Bunker Hill has a humid subtropical climate, abbreviated "Cfa" on climate maps.

== Demographics ==
Historical population
Census	Pop.	Note	%±
1880	135		—
1890	157		16.3%
1910	242		—
1920	268		10.7%
1930	298		11.2%
1940	253		−15.1%
1950	271		7.1%
1960	200		−26.2%
1970	181		−9.5%
1980	124		−31.5%
1990	111		−10.5%
2000	101		−9.0%
2010	95		−5.9%
2020	103		8.4%
U.S. Decennial Census

=== 2020 census ===
The 2020 United States census counted 103 people, 44 households, and 21 families in Bunker Hill. The population density was 74.3 per square mile (28.7/km^{2}). There were 59 housing units at an average density of 42.6 per square mile (16.4/km^{2}). The racial makeup was 99.03% (102) white or European American (99.03% non-Hispanic white), 0.0% (0) black or African-American, 0.0% (0) Native American or Alaska Native, 0.0% (0) Asian, 0.0% (0) Pacific Islander or Native Hawaiian, 0.0% (0) from other races, and 0.97% (1) from two or more races. Hispanic or Latino of any race was 0.0% (0) of the population.

Of the 44 households, 15.9% had children under the age of 18; 36.4% were married couples living together; 25.0% had a female householder with no spouse or partner present. 45.5% of households consisted of individuals and 36.4% had someone living alone who was 65 years of age or older. The average household size was 2.6 and the average family size was 4.3. The percent of those with a bachelor's degree or higher was estimated to be 14.6% of the population.

22.3% of the population was under the age of 18, 9.7% from 18 to 24, 15.5% from 25 to 44, 30.1% from 45 to 64, and 22.3% who were 65 years of age or older. The median age was 46.8 years. For every 100 females, there were 87.3 males. For every 100 females ages 18 and older, there were 81.8 males.

The 2016–2020 5-year American Community Survey estimates show that the median household income was $58,750 (with a margin of error of +/- $29,924) and the median family income was $68,750 (+/- $39,631). Males had a median income of $45,729 (+/- $16,059) versus $16,154 (+/- $6,108) for females. The median income for those above 16 years old was $31,250 (+/- $18,322). Approximately, 12.5% of families and 12.7% of the population were below the poverty line, including 28.0% of those under the age of 18 and 3.0% of those ages 65 or over.

=== 2010 census ===
As of the 2010 census, there were 95 people, 47 households, and 21 families residing in the city. The population density was 67.9 inhabitants per square mile (26.2/km^{2}). There were 66 housing units at an average density of 47.1 per square mile (18.2/km^{2}). The racial makeup of the city was 97.9% White, 1.1% Asian, and 1.1% from some other race. Hispanics and Latinos of any race were 1.1% of the population.

There were 47 households, of which 23.4% had children under the age of 18 living with them, 36.2% were married couples living together, 2.1% had a male householder with no wife present, 6.4% had a female householder with no husband present, and 55.3% were non-families. 53.2% of all households were made up of individuals, and 42.6% had someone living alone who was 65 years of age or older. The average household size was 2.02, and the average family size was 3.00.

In the city, the population was spread out, with 21.1% under the age of 18, 6.1% from 18 to 24, 14.8% from 25 to 44, 30.6% from 45 to 64, and 27.4% who were 65 years of age or older. The median age was 48.9 years. For every 100 females, there were 102.1 males. For every 100 females age 18 and over, there were 87.5 males age 18 and over.

The median income for a household in the city was $31,875, and the median income for a family was $36,250. Males had a median income of $30,313 versus $37,917 for females. The per capita income for the city was $20,661. 4.2% of families and 2.0% of the population were below the poverty line, including 3.7% of those under age 18 and 0.0% of those age 65 or over.

== Economy ==
As of 2012, 70.7% of the population over the age of 16 was in the labor force. 0.0% was in the armed forces, and 70.7% was in the civilian labor force with 70.7% being employed and 0.0% unemployed. The composition, by occupation, of the employed civilian labor force was: 34.5% in service occupations; 32.8% in sales and office occupations; 17.2% in management, business, science, and arts; 12.1% in natural resources, construction, and maintenance; 3.4% in production, transportation, and material moving. The three industries employing the largest percentages of the working civilian labor force were: retail trade (27.6%); arts, entertainment, and recreation, and accommodation and food services (13.8%); and wholesale trade (13.8%).

The cost of living in Bunker Hill is relatively low; compared to a U.S. average of 100, the cost of living index for the community is 80.0. As of 2012, the median home value in the city was $45,000, the median selected monthly owner cost was $717 for housing units with a mortgage and $275 for those without, and the median gross rent was $913.

== Government ==
Bunker Hill is a city of the third class with a mayor-council form of government. The city council consists of five members, and it meets on the second Tuesday of each month.

Bunker Hill lies within Kansas's 1st U.S. Congressional District. For the purposes of representation in the Kansas Legislature, the city is located in the 36th district of the Kansas Senate and the 109th district of the Kansas House of Representatives.

== Education ==
The community is served by Russell County USD 407 public school district. The district high school is Russell High School, located in Russell.

Bunker Hill schools were closed through school unification. The Bunker Hill High School mascot was White Owls.

== Infrastructure ==
=== Transportation ===
Interstate 70 and U.S. Route 40 run concurrently east-west, one mile south of the city. Bunker Hill-Luray Road, a paved county road, runs north–south along the city's western edge.

Union Pacific Railroad operates one freight rail line, its Kansas Pacific (KP) Line, through Bunker Hill. The line runs east–west through the community.

=== Utilities ===
Western Electric provides electricity to local residents. Rural Telephone provides landline telephone service, and Nex-Tech offers cable television and internet access. Most residents use natural gas for heating fuel; service is provided by Midwest Energy, Inc.

== Media ==
Bunker Hill is in the Wichita-Hutchinson, Kansas television market. Smoky Hills Public Television, the PBS member network for western Kansas, is headquartered in Bunker Hill.

== Culture ==
=== Points of interest ===
The Bunker Hill Museum, located in an old limestone church one block east of Main Street, displays documents and artifacts from the community's history.

=== In popular culture and the arts ===
Bunker Hill is the setting and namesake of the 2008 film Bunker Hill.

== Notable people ==
Notable individuals who were born in and/or have lived in Bunker Hill include:

- Mary Ann Bickerdyke (1817–1901), American Civil War nurse
