= Fairfield Township, Kansas =

Township in Russell County, Kansas, U.S.

Fairfield Township
- Township
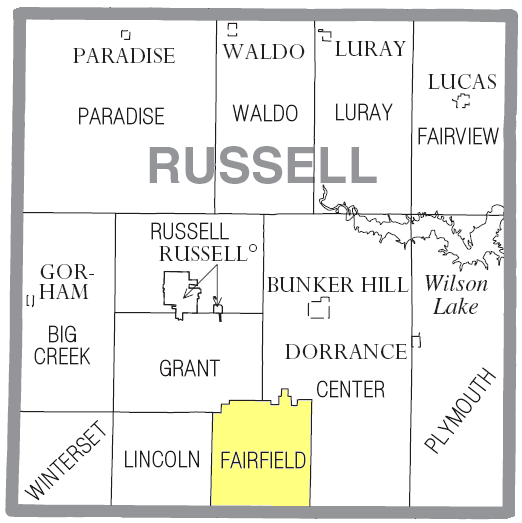
- Location of Fairfield Township in Russell County
- Coordinates: 38°44′26″N 98°45′47″W
- Country: United States
- State: Kansas
- County: Russell

Government
  - District 1 County Commissioner: Steve Reinhardt

Area
  - Total: 40.20 sq mi (104.1 km^{2})
  - Land: 40.19 sq mi (104.1 km^{2})
  - Water: 0.01 sq mi (0.026 km^{2}) 0.02%
- Elevation: 1,893 ft (577 m)

Population (2020)
  - Total: 26
  - Density: 0.65/sq mi (0.25/km^{2})
- Time zone: UTC-6 (Central (CST))
  - Summer (DST): UTC-5 (CDT)
- ZIP Code: 67544, 67626, 67665
- Area code: 785
- GNIS ID: 475315

Fairfield Township is a township in Russell County, Kansas, United States. As of the 2020 United States census, it had a population of 26.

== Geography ==
The center of Fairfield Township is located at 38°44′26″N 98°45′47″W (38.7405671, −98.8698075) at an elevation of 1,893 feet (577 m). The township lies in the Smoky Hills region of the Great Plains. The Smoky Hill River forms the northern border of the township. Two of the river's tributaries, Sellers Creek and Goose Creek, flow north across the township.

According to the United States Census Bureau, Fairfield Township occupies an area of 40.20 square miles (104.1 km^{2}) of which 40.19 square miles (104.1 km^{2}) is land and 0.01 square miles (0.026 km^{2}) is water. Located in south-central Russell County, it contains no incorporated settlements. Fairfield Township borders Center Township to the northeast and east, Barton County's Union and Wheatland Townships to the south and southwest, Lincoln Township to the west, and Grant Township to the northwest.

== Demographics ==
Historical population
Census	Pop.	Note	%±
1890	228		—
1900	260		14.0%
1910	309		18.8%
1920	285		−7.8%
1930	247		−13.3%
1940	447		81.0%
1950	302		−32.4%
1960	156		−48.3%
1970	75		−51.9%
1980	55		−26.7%
1990	63		14.5%
2000	42		−33.3%
2010	31		−26.2%
2020	26		−16.1%
U.S. Decennial Census

As of the 2020 census, there were 26 people and 8 households residing in the township. The population density was 0.65 people per square mile (0.25 people/km^{2}). There were 8 housing units. The racial makeup of the township was 88.5% White, 3.8% Black or African American, and 7.7% from two or more races. Hispanic or Latino of any race were 3.8% of the population.

There were 8 households, 100% were married couples living together. The average family size was 1.75.

In the township, the population was not spread out, with 100% of people being 65 years of age or older. For every 100 females, there were 133.3 males.

== Education ==
Fairfield Township lies within Russell County USD 407.

== Transportation ==
A network of mostly unpaved county roads laid out in a rough grid pattern covers the township. One paved county road, Bunker Hill-Hoisington Road, enters the township from the northeast and zigzags to the north-central part of the township before finally turning south. Another paved north–south road, Pioneer Road, enters the township from the north and turns east in the north-central part of the township, terminating at its junction with Bunker Hill-Hoisington Road. Michaelis Road, a paved east–west road, enters the township from the west and terminates at Bunker Hill-Hoisington Road in the southern part of the township.
