= Woodville, Kansas =

- Location within the state of Kansas Woodville (the United States)
- Coordinates: 38°58′08″N 98°49′41″W
- Country: United States
- State: Kansas
- County: Russell
- Elevation: 1,570 ft (480 m)
- Time zone: UTC-6 (Central (CST))
  - Summer (DST): UTC-5 (CDT)
- GNIS feature ID: 482043

Woodville was a small settlement in Russell County, Kansas, United States.

== History ==
Woodville was issued a post office in 1878. The post office was discontinued in 1892.

== See also ==
- List of ghost towns in Kansas
