= Waldo, Kansas =

City in Russell County, Kansas

- City
- Location within Russell County and Kansas

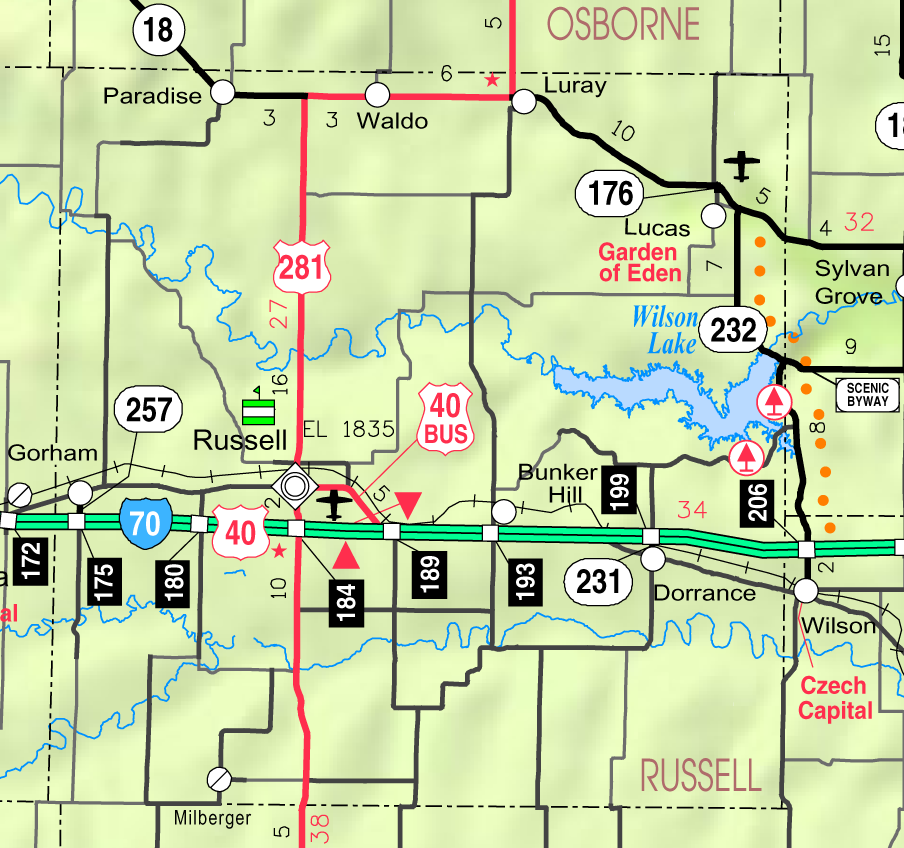
- KDOT map of Russell County (legend)
- Coordinates: 39°7′13″N 98°47′52″W
- Country: United States
- State: Kansas
- County: Russell
- Founded: 1888
- Incorporated: 1911

Area
  - Total: 0.37 sq mi (0.97 km^{2})
  - Land: 0.37 sq mi (0.97 km^{2})
  - Water: 0 sq mi (0.00 km^{2})
- Elevation: 1,713 ft (522 m)

Population (2020)
  - Total: 30
  - Density: 80/sq mi (31/km^{2})
- Time zone: UTC-6 (CST)
  - Summer (DST): UTC-5 (CDT)
- ZIP Code: 67673
- Area code: 785
- FIPS code: 20-74575
- GNIS ID: 472528

Waldo is a city in Waldo Township, Russell County, Kansas, United States. As of the 2020 census, the population of the city was 30.

== History ==
The Union Town Company established the town of Waldo on October 1, 1888, having acquired 280 acres of land on a line of the Union Pacific Railroad. The community grew over the following decades, reaching a population of approximately 300 by 1915. A small business community, including a bank, stores, and three grain elevators, developed during the 1900s. The town served as an agricultural shipping and receiving point for the surrounding area. Waldo incorporated as a city in May 1911.

Since the 1930s, the population of the community has gradually declined. Waldo High School closed in 1964, followed by Waldo Grade School in 1979. In 1993, Union Pacific abandoned its rail line through Waldo, ending rail service to the community.

== Geography ==
Waldo is located on U.S. Route 281 in north-central Kansas, 122 miles (196 km) northwest of Wichita, 224 miles (360 km) west of Kansas City and 16 miles (26 km) north-northeast of Russell, the county seat.

Located in the Smoky Hills region of the Great Plains, Waldo sits on the east bank of the West Fork of Wolf Creek, part of the Saline River watershed.

According to the United States Census Bureau, the city has a total area of 0.36 square miles (0.93 km^{2}), all land.

== Demographics ==
Historical population
Census	Pop.	Note	%±
1920	246		—
1930	279		13.4%
1940	257		−7.9%
1950	216		−16.0%
1960	178		−17.6%
1970	123		−30.9%
1980	75		−39.0%
1990	57		−24.0%
2000	48		−15.8%
2010	30		−37.5%
2020	30		0.0%
U.S. Decennial Census

=== 2010 census ===
As of the 2010 census, there were 30 people, 15 households, and 7 families residing in the city. The population density was 75 people per square mile (29/km^{2}). There were 44 housing units at an average density of 110 per square mile (44/km^{2}). The racial makeup of the city was 100.0% White. Hispanics and Latinos of any race were 0.0% of the population.

There were 15 households, of which 20.0% had children under the age of 18 living with them, 46.7% were married couples living together, 0.0% had a male householder with no wife present, 0.0% had a female householder with no husband present, and 53.3% were non-families. 53.3% of all households were made up of individuals, and 60.0% had someone living alone who was 65 years of age or older. The average household size was 2.00, and the average family size was 3.14.

In the city, the population was spread out, with 26.7% under the age of 18, 0.0% from 18 to 24, 20.0% from 25 to 44, 20.0% from 45 to 64, and 33.3% who were 65 years of age or older. The median age was 52.0 years. For every 100 females, there were 114.3 males. For every 100 females age 18 and over, there were 100 males age 18 and over.

The median income for a household in the city was $37,857, and the median income for a family was $38,393. The per capita income for the city was $15,152. There were 0.0% of families and 0.0% of the population living below the poverty line.

=== 2000 census ===
As of the census of 2000, there were 48 people, 27 households, and 15 families residing in the city. The population density was 126.0 inhabitants per square mile (48.6/km^{2}). There were 32 housing units at an average density of 84.0 per square mile (32.4/km^{2}). The racial makeup of the city was 95.83% White, 2.08% Native American, and 2.08% from two or more races.

There were 27 households, out of which 14.8% had children under the age of 18 living with them, 48.1% were married couples living together, 3.7% had a female householder with no husband present, and 44.4% were non-families. 44.4% of all households were made up of individuals, and 18.5% had someone living alone who was 65 years of age or older. The average household size was 1.78 and the average family size was 2.40.

In the city the population was spread out, with 12.5% under the age of 18, 12.5% from 18 to 24, 8.3% from 25 to 44, 29.2% from 45 to 64, and 37.5% who were 65 years of age or older. The median age was 62 years. For every 100 females, there were 108.7 males. For every 100 females age 18 and over, there were 121.1 males.

== Economy ==
As of 2012, 37.0% of the population over the age of 16 was in the labor force. 0.0% was in the armed forces, and 37.0% was in the civilian labor force with 37.0% being employed and 0.0% unemployed. The composition, by occupation, of the employed civilian labor force was: 60.0% in management, business, science, and arts; 30.0% in sales and office occupations; 10.0% in natural resources, construction, and maintenance; 0.0% in production, transportation, and material moving; and 0.0% in service occupations. The three industries employing the largest percentages of the working civilian labor force were: agriculture, forestry, fishing and hunting, and mining (40.0%); educational services, and health care and social assistance (30.0%); and retail trade (20.0%).

The cost of living in Waldo is relatively low; compared to a U.S. average of 100, the cost of living index for the community is 79.9. As of 2012, the median home value in the city was $13,800, and the median selected monthly owner cost was $467 for housing units with a mortgage and $313 for those without.

== Government ==
Waldo is a city of the third class with a mayor-council form of government. The city council consists of five members, and it meets on the first Tuesday of each month.

Waldo lies within Kansas's 1st U.S. Congressional District. For the purposes of representation in the Kansas Legislature, the city is located in the 36th district of the Kansas Senate and the 109th district of the Kansas House of Representatives.

== Education ==
The community is served by Natoma–Paradise–Waldo USD 399 public school district, which is located in Natoma.

Waldo High School consolidated with Paradise High School in 1964. Paradise High School then consolidated with Natoma High School in 1974. The Waldo High School mascot was Waldo Warriors.

== Infrastructure ==
=== Transportation ===
U.S. Route 281 and Kansas Highway 18 (K-18) run concurrently east–west through Waldo.

=== Utilities ===
Western Electric provides electricity to local residents. Gorham Telephone provides landline telephone service and offers cable television and internet access. Most residents use privately stored propane for heating fuel.

== Media ==
Waldo is in the Wichita-Hutchinson, Kansas television market.
