= East Wolf, Kansas =

- Location within the state of Kansas East Wolf (the United States)
- Coordinates: 39°05′20″N 98°31′54″W
- Country: United States
- State: Kansas
- County: Russell
- Elevation: 1,506 ft (459 m)
- Time zone: UTC-6 (Central (CST))
  - Summer (DST): UTC-5 (CDT)
- GNIS feature ID: 481867

East Wolf was a small settlement in Fairview Township, Russell County, Kansas, United States.

== History ==
East Wolf was issued a post office in 1872. The post office was discontinued in 1887.

== See also ==
- List of ghost towns in Kansas
