= Russell County, Kansas =

County in Kansas, United States

- County
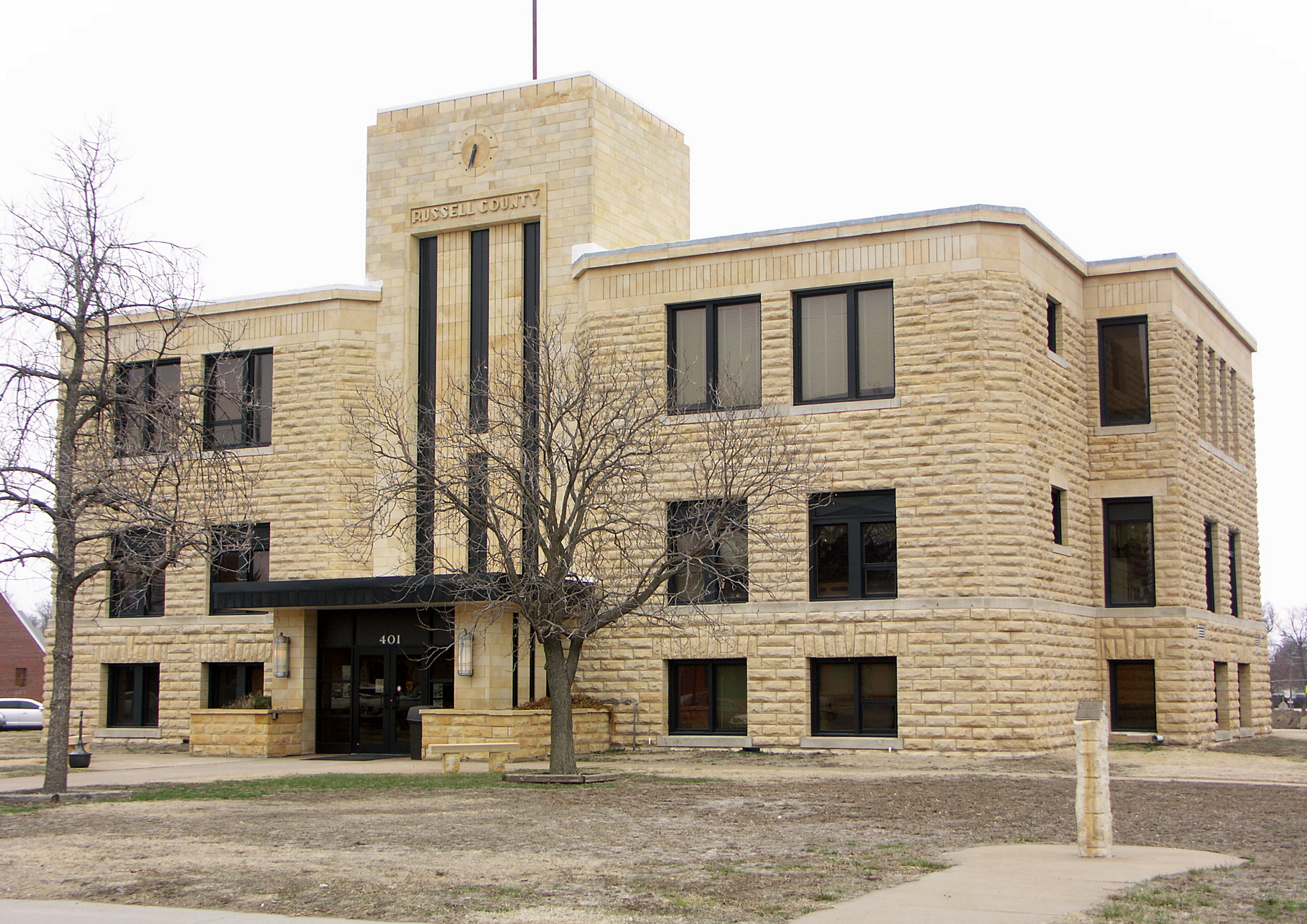
- Russell County Courthouse in Russell (2013)

- Location within the U.S. state of Kansas
- Coordinates: 38°55′00″N 98°46′00″W
- Country: United States
- State: Kansas
- Founded: February 26, 1867
- Named for: Avra P. Russell
- Seat: Russell
- Largest city: Russell

Area
  - Total: 899 sq mi (2,330 km^{2})
  - Land: 886 sq mi (2,290 km^{2})
  - Water: 13 sq mi (34 km^{2}) 1.5%

Population (2020)
  - Total: 6,691
  - Estimate (2025): 6,581 ▼
  - Density: 7.55/sq mi (2.92/km^{2})
- Time zone: UTC−6 (Central)
  - Summer (DST): UTC−5 (CDT)
- Congressional district: 1st
- Website: County Website

Russell County is a county in the U.S. state of Kansas. Its county seat and largest city is Russell. As of the 2020 census, the population was 6,691. The county was named for Avra Russell. The city of Russell was the home of former U.S. Senate Majority leader and 1996 GOP presidential nominee Bob Dole for many years.

== History ==
=== Early history ===
For many millennia, the Great Plains of North America was inhabited by nomadic Native Americans. From the 16th century to 18th century, the Kingdom of France claimed ownership of large parts of North America. In 1762, after the French and Indian War, France secretly ceded New France to Spain, per the Treaty of Fontainebleau.

=== 19th century ===
In 1802, Spain returned most of the land to France, but keeping title to about 7,500 square miles. In 1803, most of the land for modern day Kansas was acquired by the United States from France as part of the Louisiana Purchase.

In 1854, the Kansas Territory was organized, then in 1861 Kansas became the 34th U.S. state. In 1867, Russell County was established.

== Geography ==
According to the U.S. Census Bureau, the county has a total area of 899 square miles (2,330 km^{2}), of which 886 square miles (2,290 km^{2}) is land and 13 square miles (34 km^{2}) (1.5%) is water.

=== Adjacent counties ===
- Osborne County (north)
- Lincoln County (east)
- Ellsworth County (southeast)
- Barton County (south)
- Rush County (southwest)
- Ellis County (west)

=== Major highways ===
The city of Russell is the junction of Interstate 70, a major east–west highway through the Midwestern United States, and U.S. Route 281, which begins at the Canada–US border in North Dakota and ends at the Mexico–US border in Texas. I-70 also runs through Gorham on the western end of the county and Dorrance on the eastern end. Hays is 27 miles (43 km) west of Russell and Salina is 67 miles (108 km) east of Russell.

Further along I-70, Russell is approximately 250 miles (400 km) west of Kansas City, Missouri and 360 miles (580 km) east of Denver, Colorado.

K-18, a major east–west state highway in northern Kansas, enters from Osborne County to the west and runs through Paradise before joining up with US 281 through Waldo. US 281 and K-18 split again at the city limits of Luray, and K-18 continues east through Lucas and into Lincoln County. US 281 heads north into Osborne County.

South of I-70, US 281 heads into Barton County and towards the city of Great Bend.

== Demographics ==
Historical population
Census	Pop.	Note	%±
1870	156		—
1880	7,351		4,612.2%
1890	7,333		−0.2%
1900	8,489		15.8%
1910	10,800		27.2%
1920	10,748		−0.5%
1930	11,045		2.8%
1940	13,464		21.9%
1950	13,406		−0.4%
1960	11,348		−15.4%
1970	9,428		−16.9%
1980	8,868		−5.9%
1990	7,835		−11.6%
2000	7,370		−5.9%
2010	6,970		−5.4%
2020	6,691		−4.0%
2025 (est.)	6,581	▼	−1.6%
U.S. Decennial Census; 1790-1960 1900-1990; 1990-2000 2010-2020

=== Racial and ethnic composition ===
Russell County, Kansas – Racial and ethnic composition Note: the US Census treats Hispanic/Latino as an ethnic category. This table excludes Latinos from the racial categories and assigns them to a separate category. Hispanics/Latinos may be of any race.
Race / Ethnicity (NH = Non-Hispanic)	Pop 1980	Pop 1990	Pop 2000	Pop 2010	Pop 2020	% 1980	% 1990	% 2000	% 2010	% 2020
White alone (NH)	8,773	7,706	7,146	6,640	6,039	98.93%	98.35%	96.96%	95.27%	90.26%
Black or African American alone (NH)	35	43	36	53	60	0.39%	0.55%	0.49%	0.76%	0.90%
Native American or Alaska Native alone (NH)	20	35	38	42	29	0.23%	0.45%	0.52%	0.60%	0.43%
Asian alone (NH)	8	6	24	33	28	0.09%	0.08%	0.33%	0.47%	0.42%
Native Hawaiian or Pacific Islander alone (NH)	x	x	0	1	0	x	x	0.00%	0.01%	0.00%
Other race alone (NH)	7	0	5	3	13	0.08%	0.00%	0.07%	0.04%	0.19%
Mixed race or Multiracial (NH)	x	x	54	83	286	x	x	0.73%	1.19%	4.27%
Hispanic or Latino (any race)	25	45	67	115	236	0.28%	0.57%	0.91%	1.65%	3.53%
Total	8,868	7,835	7,370	6,970	6,691	100.00%	100.00%	100.00%	100.00%	100.00%

=== 2020 census ===
As of the 2020 census, the county had a population of 6,691. The median age was 44.9 years. 22.6% of residents were under the age of 18 and 23.3% of residents were 65 years of age or older. For every 100 females there were 96.8 males, and for every 100 females age 18 and over there were 95.1 males age 18 and over.

The racial makeup of the county was 91.7% White, 0.9% Black or African American, 0.5% American Indian and Alaska Native, 0.4% Asian, 0.0% Native Hawaiian and Pacific Islander, 1.0% from some other race, and 5.5% from two or more races. Hispanic or Latino residents of any race comprised 3.5% of the population.

60.8% of residents lived in urban areas, while 39.2% lived in rural areas.

There were 2,956 households in the county, of which 25.5% had children under the age of 18 living with them and 25.6% had a female householder with no spouse or partner present. About 35.0% of all households were made up of individuals and 18.0% had someone living alone who was 65 years of age or older.

There were 3,675 housing units, of which 19.6% were vacant. Among occupied housing units, 72.6% were owner-occupied and 27.4% were renter-occupied. The homeowner vacancy rate was 4.0% and the rental vacancy rate was 16.6%.

=== 2000 census ===
As of the census of 2000, there were 7,370 people, 3,207 households, and 2,020 families residing in the county. The population density was 8 people per square mile (3.1 people/km^{2}). There were 3,871 housing units at an average density of 4 per square mile (1.5/km^{2}). The racial makeup of the county was 97.58% White, 0.50% Black or African American, 0.56% Native American, 0.33% Asian, 0.01% Pacific Islander, 0.27% from other races, and 0.75% from two or more races. 0.91% of the population were Hispanic or Latino of any race.

There were 3,207 households, out of which 25.40% had children under the age of 18 living with them, 53.40% were married couples living together, 7.10% had a female householder with no husband present, and 37.00% were non-families. 32.80% of all households were made up of individuals, and 16.80% had someone living alone who was 65 years of age or older. The average household size was 2.23 and the average family size was 2.83.

In the county, the population was spread out, with 22.40% under the age of 18, 5.80% from 18 to 24, 23.30% from 25 to 44, 24.30% from 45 to 64, and 24.10% who were 65 years of age or older. The median age was 44 years. For every 100 females there were 92.50 males. For every 100 females age 18 and over, there were 88.70 males.

The median income for a household in the county was $29,284, and the median income for a family was $40,355. Males had a median income of $25,916 versus $17,957 for females. The per capita income for the county was $17,073. About 9.10% of families and 12.00% of the population were below the poverty line, including 13.80% of those under age 18 and 8.50% of those age 65 or over.

== Government ==
=== Presidential elections ===
Presidential election results

United States presidential election results for Russell County, Kansas
Year	Republican		Democratic		Third party(ies)	
Year	No.	%	No.	%	No.	%
1888	953	60.82%	571	36.44%	43	2.74%
1892	1,007	57.44%	0	0.00%	746	42.56%
1896	902	51.60%	823	47.08%	23	1.32%
1900	1,233	59.71%	810	39.23%	22	1.07%
1904	1,451	71.41%	515	25.34%	66	3.25%
1908	1,360	57.12%	976	40.99%	45	1.89%
1912	416	16.91%	983	39.96%	1,061	43.13%
1916	2,011	48.88%	1,934	47.01%	169	4.11%
1920	2,407	75.27%	724	22.64%	67	2.10%
1924	2,637	64.30%	687	16.75%	777	18.95%
1928	2,782	66.56%	1,366	32.68%	32	0.77%
1932	1,805	38.98%	2,723	58.80%	103	2.22%
1936	2,241	37.45%	3,736	62.43%	7	0.12%
1940	3,714	58.56%	2,579	40.67%	49	0.77%
1944	3,344	67.56%	1,583	31.98%	23	0.46%
1948	3,113	56.48%	2,343	42.51%	56	1.02%
1952	4,813	76.00%	1,499	23.67%	21	0.33%
1956	3,920	71.78%	1,528	27.98%	13	0.24%
1960	3,607	65.57%	1,870	33.99%	24	0.44%
1964	2,435	48.93%	2,505	50.33%	37	0.74%
1968	3,177	67.04%	1,261	26.61%	301	6.35%
1972	3,168	73.81%	1,011	23.56%	113	2.63%
1976	3,165	67.79%	1,453	31.12%	51	1.09%
1980	3,241	73.04%	910	20.51%	286	6.45%
1984	3,673	76.99%	1,055	22.11%	43	0.90%
1988	2,403	61.21%	1,448	36.88%	75	1.91%
1992	1,434	35.72%	1,178	29.34%	1,403	34.94%
1996	3,347	78.98%	705	16.64%	186	4.39%
2000	2,434	69.90%	886	25.45%	162	4.65%
2004	2,671	75.77%	810	22.98%	44	1.25%
2008	2,509	76.19%	736	22.35%	48	1.46%
2012	2,553	79.78%	593	18.53%	54	1.69%
2016	2,574	80.61%	461	14.44%	158	4.95%
2020	2,790	80.47%	600	17.31%	77	2.22%
2024	2,632	79.73%	608	18.42%	61	1.85%

Russell County is overwhelmingly Republican. The last Democrat to carry the county was Lyndon B. Johnson in 1964, and Franklin D. Roosevelt in 1932 and 1936 is the only other to ever achieve this feat. In 1996, aided by a strong “favorite son” vote, Russell was Bob Dole's second strongest county nationwide behind the famous Republican bastion of Ochiltree County, Texas.

=== Laws ===
Russell County was a prohibition, or "dry", county until the Kansas Constitution was amended in 1986 and voters approved the sale of alcoholic liquor by the individual drink with a 30 percent food sales requirement.

== Education ==
Schools in Russell County have experienced major change in the 2010–11 school year. USD 407, which previously served all of Russell County except the northwest and southeast corners, retracted its footprint and will only serve the cities of Russell, Gorham and Bunker Hill and areas to the south of Interstate 70 along and adjacent to US 281.

Lucas-Luray High School, previously operated by USD 407, was acquired by the school district in Sylvan Grove in western Lincoln County and will be converted into a K-6 school. Meanwhile, the elementary school in Luray has closed. Students in Lucas and Luray in grades 7-12 will attend school in Sylvan Grove.

=== Unified school districts ===
- Central Plains USD 112 (serves Dorrance and the southeastern part of county south of I-70; extends into Barton, Ellsworth and Rice Counties)
- Sylvan–Lucas USD 299 (serves Lucas, Luray and the northeastern part of county along K-18; extends into Lincoln County)
- Paradise-Natoma-Waldo USD 399 (serves Paradise, Waldo and the northwestern part of county along K-18; extends into Osborne and Rooks Counties)
- Russell County USD 407 (serves cities of Russell, Gorham, Bunker Hill and rural south central and southwestern parts of county; does not extend into any other counties)

== Communities ==
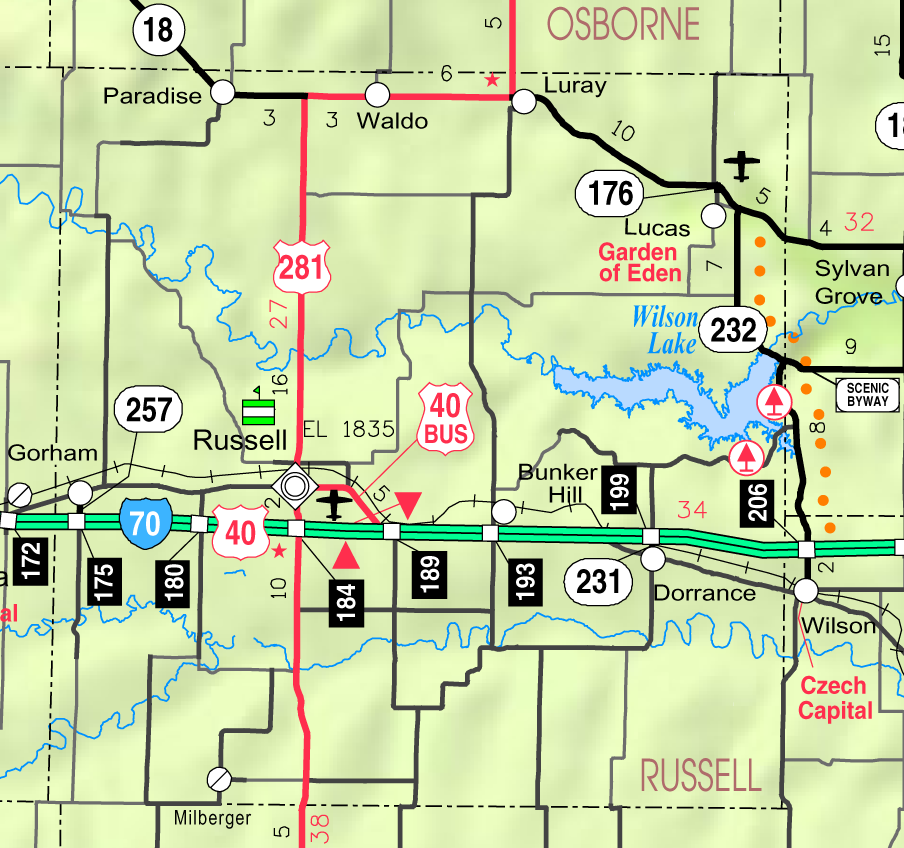
2005 map of Russell County (map legend)

List of townships / incorporated cities / unincorporated communities / extinct former communities within Russell County.

=== Cities ===
- Bunker Hill
- Dorrance
- Gorham
- Lucas
- Luray
- Paradise
- Russell (county seat)
- Waldo

=== Unincorporated communities ===
‡ means a community has portions in an adjacent county.

- Dubuque‡
- Fairport
- Milberger

=== Ghost towns ===
- Bayne
- Blue Stem
- East Wolf
- Fay
- Forest Hill
- Greenvale
- Hawley
- Homer
- Jack
- Kennebec
- Success
- Winterset
- Woodville

=== Townships ===
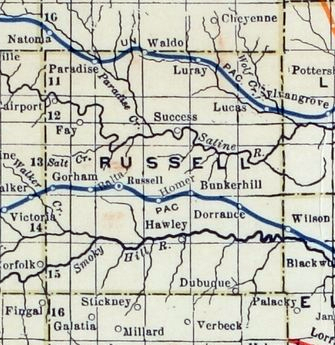
1915-1918 Railroad Map of Russell County

Russell County is divided into twelve townships. The city of Russell is considered governmentally independent and is excluded from the census figures for the townships. In the following table, the population center is the largest city (or cities) included in that township's population total, if it is of a significant size.

Sources: 2000 U.S. Gazetteer from the U.S. Census Bureau.
Township	FIPS	Population center	Population	Population density /km^{2} (/sq mi)	Land area km^{2} (sq mi)	Water area km^{2} (sq mi)	Water %	Geographic coordinates
Big Creek	06700	Gorham	515	3 (7)	186 (72)	0 (0)	0.03%	38°51′40″N 98°59′8″W
Center	12150	Bunker Hill	255	1 (2)	359 (139)	9 (3)	2.41%	38°51′7″N 98°40′29″W
Fairfield	22200		42	0 (1)	104 (40)	0 (0)	0.03%	38°44′37″N 98°46′0″W
Fairview	22650	Lucas	526	3 (7)	185 (71)	1 (1)	0.77%	39°2′16″N 98°31′54″W
Grant	28100		159	1 (3)	135 (52)	0 (0)	0.18%	38°49′41″N 98°50′31″W
Lincoln	41125	Milberger	147	2 (4)	94 (36)	0 (0)	0%	38°44′40″N 98°51′54″W
Luray	43275	Luray	270	1 (4)	183 (71)	2 (1)	0.94%	39°5′6″N 98°40′3″W
Paradise	54350	Paradise	169	0 (1)	372 (144)	1 (0)	0.16%	39°3′9″N 98°55′31″W
Plymouth	56925	Dorrance	319	1 (3)	255 (98)	24 (9)	8.50%	38°50′46″N 98°33′4″W
Russell	61850		89	1 (2)	127 (49)	0 (0)	0.03%	38°54′40″N 98°51′27″W
Waldo	74600	Waldo	108	1 (2)	186 (72)	0 (0)	0.19%	39°3′10″N 98°46′14″W
Winterset	80125		75	1 (2)	93 (36)	0 (0)	0.05%	38°44′15″N 98°59′30″W

== See also ==
- National Register of Historic Places listings in Russell County, Kansas

Community information for Kansas

- Kansas locations by per capita income
- List of counties in Kansas
- List of townships in Kansas
- List of cities in Kansas
- List of unincorporated communities in Kansas
- List of ghost towns in Kansas
