= Winterset Township, Kansas =

Township in Russell County, Kansas, U.S.

Winterset Township
- Township
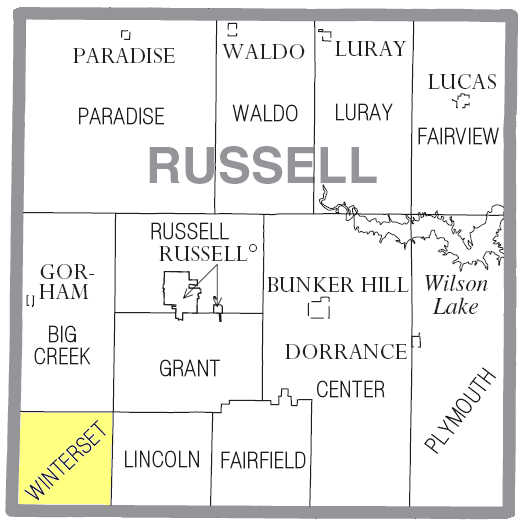
- Location of Winterset Township in Russell County
- Coordinates: 38°44′24″N 98°59′08″W
- Country: United States
- State: Kansas
- County: Russell

Government
  - District 1 County Commissioner: Steve Reinhardt

Area
  - Total: 36.00 sq mi (93.2 km^{2})
  - Land: 35.98 sq mi (93.2 km^{2})
  - Water: 0.02 sq mi (0.052 km^{2}) 0.06%
- Elevation: 1,800 ft (550 m)

Population (2020)
  - Total: 53
  - Density: 1.5/sq mi (0.57/km^{2})
- Time zone: UTC-6 (Central (CST))
  - Summer (DST): UTC-5 (CDT)
- ZIP Code: 67640, 67665
- Area code: 785
- GNIS feature ID: 475305

Winterset Township is a township in Russell County, Kansas, United States. As of the 2020 United States census, it had a population of 53.

== Geography ==
The center of Winterset Township is located at 38°44′24″N 98°59′08″W (38.7400119, −98.9856462) at an elevation of 1,804 feet (550 m). The township lies in the Smoky Hills region of the Great Plains. The Smoky Hill River runs through the township, entering its west-central part, flowing windingly northeast, then exiting through the township's northeastern corner.

According to the records kept by the United States Census Bureau, Winterset Township comprises an area of 36.0 square miles (93.2 km^{2}) of which 35.98 square miles (93.2 km^{2}) is land and 0.02 square miles (0.1 km^{2}) is water. Forming the southwestern corner of Russell County, the township contains no incorporated settlements and borders Big Creek Township to the north, Grant Township to the northeast, Lincoln Township to the east, Barton County's Fairview Township to the south, Rush County's Pleasantdale Township to the southwest, and Ellis County's Freedom Township to the west.

== Demographics ==
Historical population
Census	Pop.	Note	%±
1890	291		—
1900	345		18.6%
1910	305		−11.6%
1920	323		5.9%
1930	299		−7.4%
1940	286		−4.3%
1950	181		−36.7%
1960	159		−12.2%
1970	129		−18.9%
1980	100		−22.5%
1990	93		−7.0%
2000	75		−19.4%
2010	67		−10.7%
2020	53		−20.9%
U.S. Decennial Census

As of the 2020 census, there were 53 people and 22 households residing in the township. The population density was 1.5 people per square mile (0.58 people/km^{2}). There were 22 housing units. The racial makeup of the township was 100% White. Hispanic or Latino of any race were 0.0% of the population.

There were 22 households: 100% were married couples living together, 0.0% had a male householder with no wife present, and 0.0% had a female householder with no husband present. The average family size was 2.18.

In the township, the population was spread out, with 24.5% under the age of 18, 0.0% from 18 to 24, 17.0% from 25 to 44, 49.1% from 45 to 64, and 0.0% who were 65 years of age or older. The median age was 52.2 years. For every 100 females, there were 269.2 males. For every 100 females age 18 and over, there were 169.2 males.

== Education ==
Winterset Township lies within Russell County USD 407.

== Transportation ==
A network of mostly unpaved county roads laid out in a rough grid pattern covers the township. One paved road, Balta-Galatia Road, runs north–south through the eastern part of the township.
