= Success, Kansas =

- Location within the state of Kansas Success (the United States)
- Coordinates: 38°59′52″N 98°43′38″W
- Country: United States
- State: Kansas
- County: Russell
- Elevation: 1,570 ft (480 m)
- Time zone: UTC-6 (Central (CST))
  - Summer (DST): UTC-5 (CDT)
- GNIS feature ID: 482556

Success was a small settlement in Fairview Township, Russell County, Kansas, United States.

== History ==
Success was issued a post office in 1878. The post office was discontinued in 1909.

== See also ==
- List of ghost towns in Kansas
