= Blue Stem, Kansas =

- Location within the state of Kansas Blue Stem (the United States)
- Coordinates: 39°01′07″N 98°31′45″W
- Country: United States
- State: Kansas
- County: Russell
- Elevation: 1,539 ft (469 m)
- Time zone: UTC-6 (Central (CST))
  - Summer (DST): UTC-5 (CDT)
- GNIS feature ID: 481835

Blue Stem was a small settlement in Fairview Township, Russell County, Kansas, United States.

== History ==
Blue Stem was issued a post office in 1877. The post office was moved to Lucas in 1887.

== See also ==
- List of ghost towns in Kansas
