= Lincoln Township, Russell County, Kansas =

Township in Russell County, Kansas, U.S.

Lincoln Township
- Township
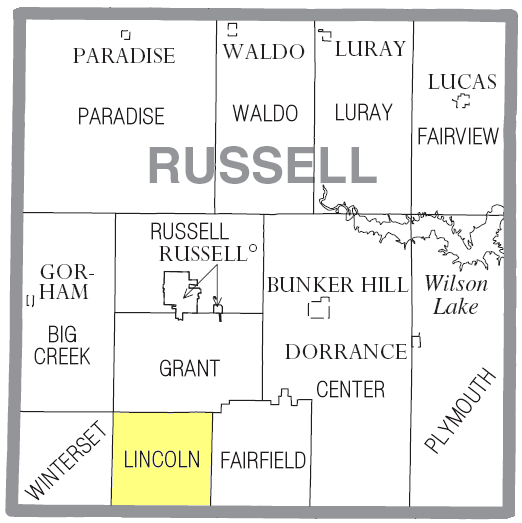
- Location of Lincoln Township in Russell County
- Coordinates: 38°44′26″N 98°52′11″W
- Country: United States
- State: Kansas
- County: Russell

Government
  - District 1 County Commissioner: Steve Reinhardt

Area
  - Total: 36.13 sq mi (93.6 km^{2})
  - Land: 36.13 sq mi (93.6 km^{2})
  - Water: 0 sq mi (0 km^{2}) 0%
- Elevation: 1,890 ft (576 m)

Population (2020)
  - Total: 109
  - Density: 3.02/sq mi (1.16/km^{2})
- Time zone: UTC-6 (Central (CST))
  - Summer (DST): UTC-5 (CDT)
- ZIP Code: 67665
- Area code: 785
- GNIS feature ID: 475311

Lincoln Township is a township in Russell County, Kansas, United States. As of the 2020 United States census, it had a population of 109.

== History ==
Lincoln Township was organized from part of Russell Township in the 1880s. Grant Township was organized from part of Lincoln Township in 1907.

== Geography ==
The center of Lincoln Township is located at 38°44′26″N 98°52′11″W (38.7405671, −98.8698075) at an elevation of 1,890 feet (580 m). The township lies in the Smoky Hills region of the Great Plains. The Smoky Hill River runs in and out of the township, winding back and forth across its northern border. Landon Creek, a tributary of the river, flows northeast through the township.

According to the United States Census Bureau, Lincoln Township comprises an area of 36.13 square miles (93.6 km^{2}), all of it land. Located in southwestern Russell County, it contains no incorporated settlements. One unincorporated community, Milberger, is located in the southwestern part of the township. Lincoln Township borders Grant Township to the north, Fairfield Township to the east, Barton County's Wheatland and Fairview Townships to the south, Winterset Township to the west, and Big Creek Township to the northwest.

== Demographics ==
Historical population
Census	Pop.	Note	%±
1890	709		—
1900	1,088		53.5%
1910	431		−60.4%
1920	488		13.2%
1930	440		−9.8%
1940	467		6.1%
1950	350		−25.1%
1960	288		−17.7%
1970	205		−28.8%
1980	146		−28.8%
1990	136		−6.8%
2000	147		8.1%
2010	150		2.0%
2020	109		−27.3%
U.S. Decennial Census

As of the 2020 census, there were 109 people and 45 households residing in the township. The population density was 3.02 people per square mile (1.17 people/km^{2}). There were 45 housing units. The racial makeup of the township was 96.3% White and 3.7% from two or more races. Hispanic or Latino of any race were 1.8% of the population.

There were 45 households: 20.0% were married couples living together, 71.1% had a male householder with no wife present, and 8.9% had a female householder with no husband present. The average family size was 2.67.

In the township, the population was spread out, with 0.0% under the age of 18, 0.0% from 18 to 24, 3.7% from 25 to 44, 38.5% from 45 to 64, and 17.4% who were 65 years of age or older. The median age was 63.0 years. For every 100 females, there were 225.0 males.

== Education ==
Lincoln Township lies within Russell County USD 407.

== Transportation ==
U.S. Route 281 runs north–south through the township, connecting to a network of mostly unpaved county roads laid out in a rough grid pattern across the township. Milberger Road, a paved county road, zigzags west and south from its junction with U.S. 281 in the north of the township, running north–south through Milberger before turning west along the county line and exiting the township. Michaelis Road runs east–west through Milberger and is paved east of its intersection with U.S. 281.
