= Gorham, Kansas =

City in Russell County, Kansas

- City
- Location within Russell County and Kansas

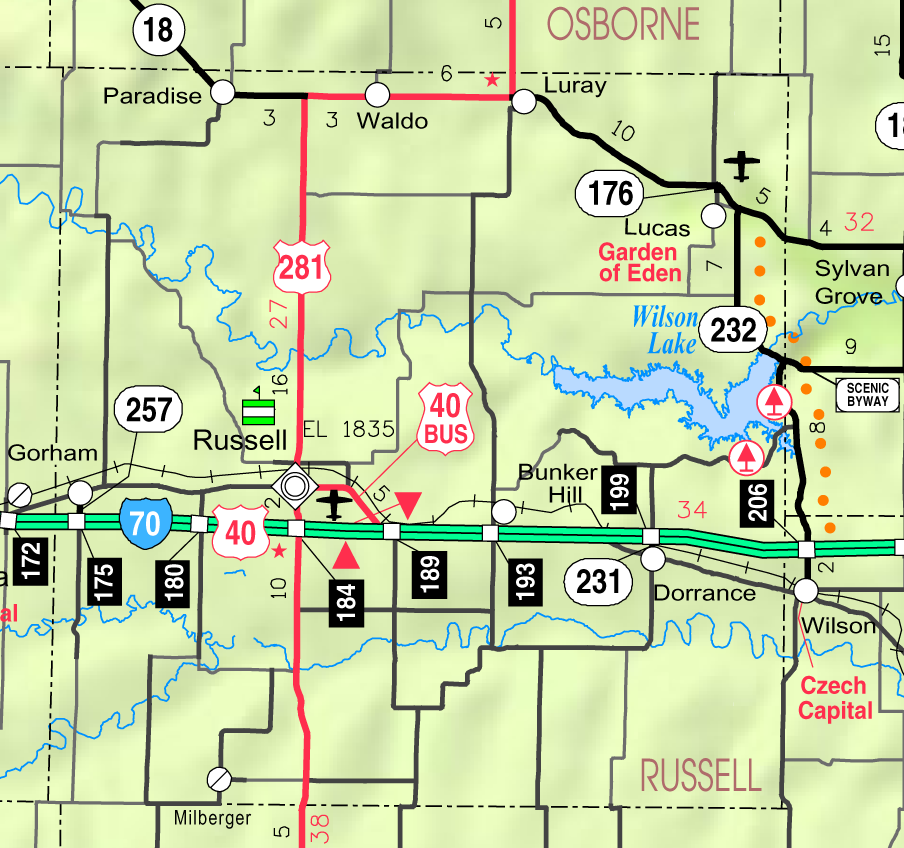
- KDOT map of Russell County (legend)
- Coordinates: 38°52′49″N 99°1′22″W
- Country: United States
- State: Kansas
- County: Russell
- Founded: 1886
- Incorporated: 1941
- Named for: Dodge Gorham

Area
  - Total: 0.24 sq mi (0.62 km^{2})
  - Land: 0.24 sq mi (0.62 km^{2})
  - Water: 0 sq mi (0.00 km^{2})
- Elevation: 1,916 ft (584 m)

Population (2020)
  - Total: 376
  - Density: 1,600/sq mi (610/km^{2})
- Time zone: UTC-6 (CST)
  - Summer (DST): UTC-5 (CDT)
- ZIP Code: 67640
- Area code: 785
- FIPS code: 20-27000
- GNIS ID: 475207

Gorham is a city in Russell County, Kansas, United States. As of the 2020 census, the population of the city was 376.

== History ==
Beaten to the settlement of Wilson, Kansas by Bohemian colonists, Pennsylvania Dutch settlers from Philadelphia and Lancaster, Pennsylvania established a community on the Kansas Pacific Railway at the future site of Gorham in April 1872. Elijah Dodge Gorham, a settler from Illinois, gave the town its name when he platted it in 1879. Seeking to create a local trading center, he formally established the town in July 1886, gave land for a Catholic Church and cemetery, and started several businesses including a general store, grain elevator, post office, lumberyard, and a coal yard. Additional grain elevators and a stockyard subsequently opened, establishing Gorham as a farming community.

The discovery of oil deposits in Russell County transformed the local economy in the 1920s. Companies including Texaco, Stanolind, and Sohio started operations in the area, stimulating Gorham's growth. A brick school building was built in 1922 followed by a second building in 1930 and another in 1949. Gorham incorporated as a city in 1941. By 1944, it had a diverse business community, two oil field production companies, and public schools. From the 1950s to the early 1980s, the city expanded further through the development of residential additions.

== Geography ==
Gorham is located in west-central Kansas, approximately 121 miles (195 km) northwest of Wichita and 237 miles (381 km) west of Kansas City, and 355 miles (571 km) east of Denver. Located 1.2 miles (1.9 km) north of Interstate 70, it is roughly 9 miles (14 km) west of Russell, the county seat.

Gorham lies in the Smoky Hills region of the Great Plains, approximately 9 miles (14 km) north of the Smoky Hill River and 11 miles (18 km) south of the Saline River.

According to the United States Census Bureau, the city has a total area of 0.24 square miles (0.62 km^{2}), all land.

== Demographics ==
Historical population
Census	Pop.	Note	%±
1950	375		—
1960	429		14.4%
1970	379		−11.7%
1980	355		−6.3%
1990	284		−20.0%
2000	360		26.8%
2010	334		−7.2%
2020	376		12.6%
U.S. Decennial Census

=== 2020 census ===
The 2020 United States census counted 376 people, 147 households, and 96 families in Gorham. The population density was 1,573.2 per square mile (607.4/km^{2}). There were 169 housing units at an average density of 707.1 per square mile (273.0/km^{2}). The racial makeup was 93.09% (350) white or European American (91.49% non-Hispanic white), 1.33% (5) black or African-American, 0.0% (0) Native American or Alaska Native, 0.53% (2) Asian, 0.0% (0) Pacific Islander or Native Hawaiian, 0.0% (0) from other races, and 5.05% (19) from two or more races. Hispanic or Latino of any race was 2.93% (11) of the population.

Of the 147 households, 30.6% had children under the age of 18; 50.3% were married couples living together; 17.7% had a female householder with no spouse or partner present. 28.6% of households consisted of individuals and 11.6% had someone living alone who was 65 years of age or older. The average household size was 2.7 and the average family size was 3.1. The percent of those with a bachelor's degree or higher was estimated to be 8.2% of the population.

29.5% of the population was under the age of 18, 10.1% from 18 to 24, 24.5% from 25 to 44, 20.7% from 45 to 64, and 15.2% who were 65 years of age or older. The median age was 36.3 years. For every 100 females, there were 95.8 males. For every 100 females ages 18 and older, there were 94.9 males.

The 2016–2020 5-year American Community Survey estimates show that the median household income was $55,921 (with a margin of error of +/- $6,578) and the median family income was $57,171 (+/- $9,125). Males had a median income of $36,528 (+/- $10,542) versus $27,621 (+/- $2,676) for females. The median income for those above 16 years old was $28,871 (+/- $3,147). Approximately, 3.1% of families and 6.2% of the population were below the poverty line, including 7.4% of those under the age of 18 and 0.0% of those ages 65 or over.

=== 2010 census ===
As of the 2010 census, there were 334 people, 150 households, and 98 families residing in the city. The population density was 1,670 inhabitants per square mile (640/km^{2}). There were 171 housing units at an average density of 855 per square mile (330/km^{2}). The racial makeup of the city was 98.8% White, 0.3% American Indian, and 0.9% from two or more races. Hispanics and Latinos of any race were 0.3% of the population.

There were 150 households, of which 27.3% had children under the age of 18 living with them, 52.7% were married couples living together, 2.0% had a male householder with no wife present, 10.7% had a female householder with no husband present, and 34.7% were non-families. 31.3% of all households were made up of individuals, and 11.3% had someone living alone who was 65 years of age or older. The average household size was 2.23, and the average family size was 2.76.

In the city, the population was spread out, with 23.4% under the age of 18, 6.1% from 18 to 24, 27.3% from 25 to 44, 27.3% from 45 to 64, and 15.9% who were 65 years of age or older. The median age was 37.3 years. For every 100 females, there were 93.1 males. For every 100 females age 18 and over, there were 93.9 males age 18 and over.

The median income for a household in the city was $52,885, and the median income for a family was $62,833. Males had a median income of $33,333 versus $23,194 for females. The per capita income for the city was $20,926. About 4.1% of families and 6.6% of the population were below the poverty line, including 3.8% of those under age 18 and 8.3% of those age 65 or over.

== Economy ==
As of 2012, 82.3% of the population over the age of 16 was in the labor force. 0.0% was in the armed forces, and 82.3% was in the civilian labor force with 77.1% being employed and 5.2% unemployed. The composition, by occupation, of the employed civilian labor force was: 23.4% in management, business, science, and arts; 23.4% in sales and office occupations; 19.6% in natural resources, construction, and maintenance; 19.6% in service occupations; and 13.9% in production, transportation, and material moving. The three industries employing the largest percentages of the working civilian labor force were: construction (21.1%); educational services, and health care and social assistance (18.7%); and arts, entertainment, and recreation, and accommodation and food services (11.5%).

The cost of living in Gorham is relatively low; compared to a U.S. average of 100, the cost of living index for the community is 80.7. As of 2012, the median home value in the city was $59,700, the median selected monthly owner cost was $800 for housing units with a mortgage and $314 for those without, and the median gross rent was $621.

== Government ==
Gorham is a city of the third class with a mayor-council form of government. The city council consists of five members, and it meets on the second Monday of each month.

Gorham lies within Kansas's 1st U.S. Congressional District, represented by Tracey Mann (R-Salina). For the purposes of representation in the Kansas Legislature, the city is located in the 36th district of the Kansas Senate and the 109th district of the Kansas House of Representatives.

== Education ==
The community is served by Russell County USD 407 public school district. The district high school is Russell High School.

Mandated by state law, Gorham's public schools joined Russell County Schools (USD 407) in 1967. Subsequent consolidation led to the closure of Gorham High School in 1984 and Gorham Elementary School in 1997. The Gorham High School mascot was Gorham Oilers.

== Infrastructure ==
=== Transportation ===
Interstate 70 and U.S. Route 40 run concurrently east–west, just over one mile south of the city. The old alignment of U.S. 40 runs east–west through the city, intersecting 176th Street, a paved county road formerly designated K-257, which runs north–south.

Union Pacific Railroad operates one freight rail line, its Kansas Pacific (KP) line, through Gorham. The line runs northeast–southwest through the community.

=== Utilities ===
Midwest Energy, Inc. provides electricity to local residents. Gorham Telephone provides landline telephone service and offers cable television and internet access. Most residents use natural gas for heating fuel; service is provided by Kansas Gas Service. The city government is responsible for water distribution, sewer maintenance, and trash disposal.

== Media ==
Gorham is in the Wichita-Hutchinson, Kansas television market.

== Culture ==
=== In popular culture and the arts ===
Gorham was both a setting and filming location of the 1973 film Paper Moon.

== See also ==
- Walker Army Airfield, an abandoned World War II airfield.
