= Russell County USD 407 =

Public school district in Russell, Kansas

Address
- 802 N. Main St. Russell, Kansas, 67665; United States
- Coordinates: 38.89321°N 98.86021°W

District information
- Type: Public
- Grades: K to 12
- Schools: 4

Other information
- Website: usd407.org

Russell County USD 407 is a public unified school district headquartered in Russell, Kansas, United States. The district includes the communities of Russell, Bunker Hill, Gorham, Milberger, and nearby rural areas.

== Schools ==
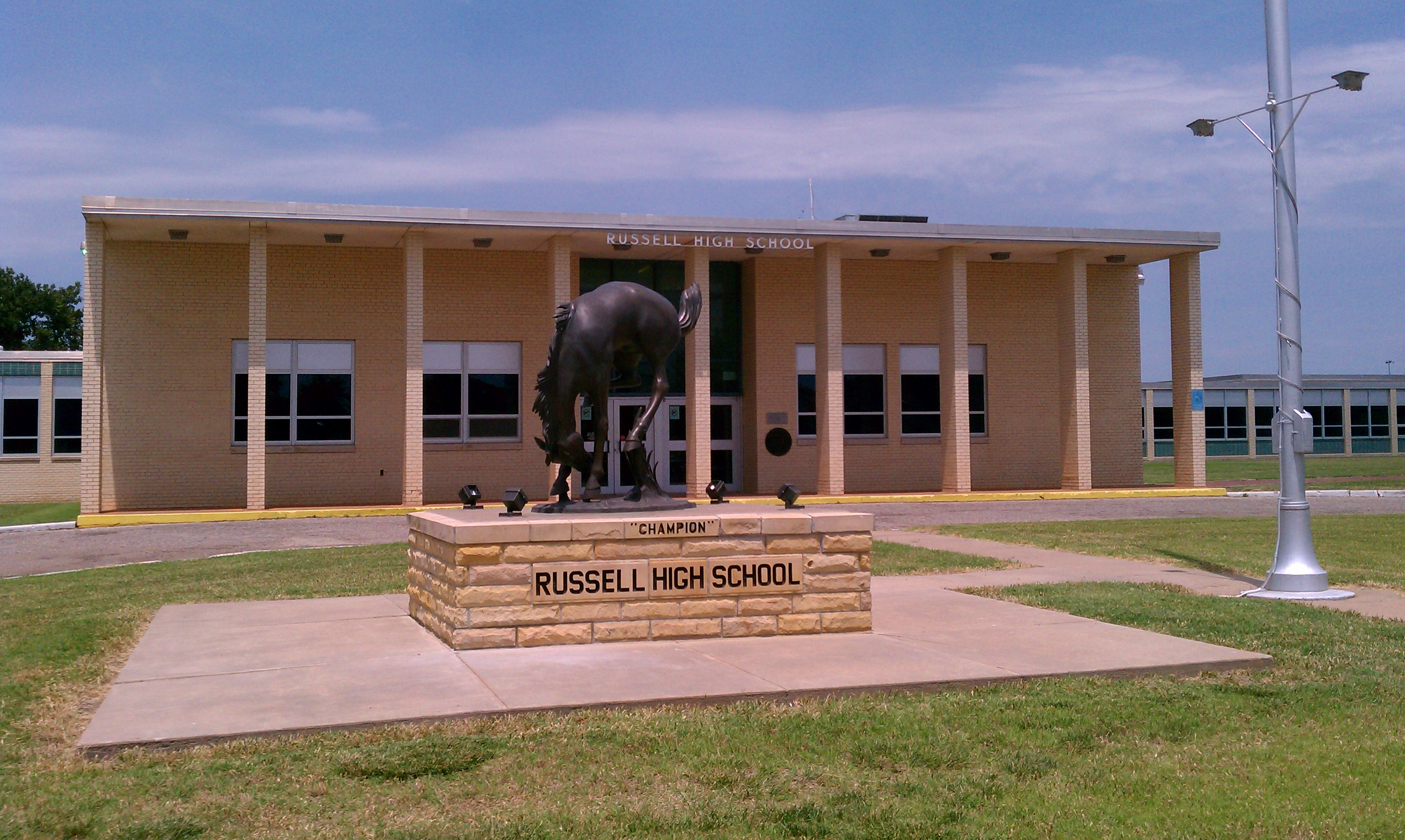
Russell High School (2011)

The school district operates the following schools:

- Russell High School (9-12)
- Ruppenthal Middle School (6-8)
- Bickerdyke Elementary School (2-5)
- Simpson Elementary School (K-1)

== History ==
In January 2024, USD 407 announced they were considering changes to reduce operating costs:

- closing Ruppenthal Middle School, reassigning 6th grade students to Bickerdyke Elementary School, and reassigning 7th & 8th grade students to Russell High School.
- reducing bus routes from 6 to 4.

== See also ==
- Kansas State Department of Education
- Kansas State High School Activities Association
- List of high schools in Kansas
- List of unified school districts in Kansas
