= Saline River (Kansas) =

River in Kansas, U.S.

Saline River Ne Miskua
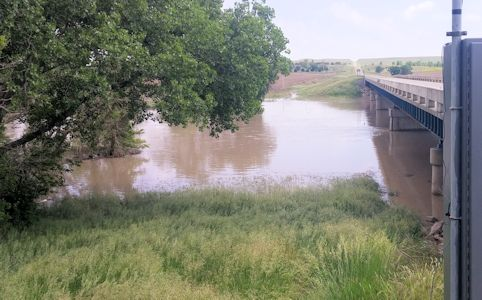
- Saline River near Russell, Kansas

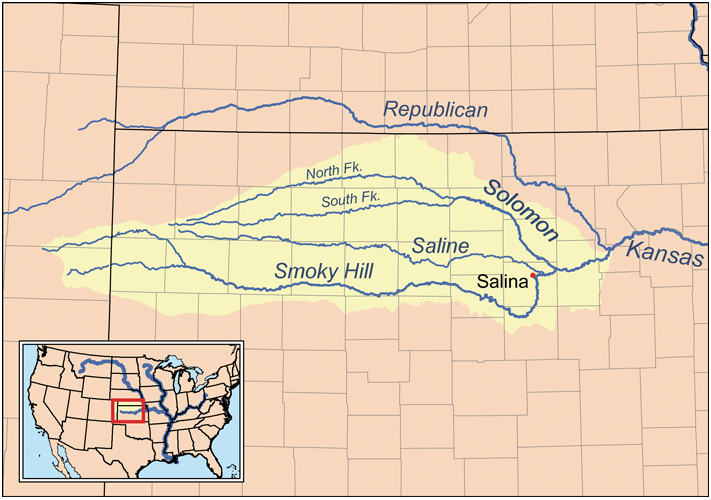
- Map of the Smoky Hill drainage basin including the Saline River

Location
- Country: United States
- State: Kansas

Physical characteristics
- Source confluence
  - location: Sheridan County, Kansas
  - coordinates: 39°09′38″N 100°42′50″W
  - elevation: 2,864 ft (873 m)
- Mouth: Smoky Hill River
  - location: New Cambria, Kansas
  - coordinates: 38°51′28″N 97°30′22″W
  - elevation: 1,171 ft (357 m)
- Length: 397 mi (639 km)
- Basin size: 3,419 sq mi (8,860 km^{2})
- Discharge
  - location: USGS 06869500 at Tescott, KS
  - average: 214 cu ft/s (6.1 m^{3}/s)
  - minimum: 0 cu ft/s (0 m^{3}/s)
  - maximum: 47,600 cu ft/s (1,350 m^{3}/s)

Basin features
- Tributaries
  - left: North Fork Saline River
  - right: South Fork Saline River
- Watersheds: Saline-Smoky Hill-Kansas-Missouri-Mississippi

The Saline River is a 397-mile-long (639 km) tributary of the Smoky Hill River in the central Great Plains of North America. The entire length of the river lies in the U.S. state of Kansas in the northwest part of the state. Its name comes from the French translation of its Native name Ne Miskua, referring to its salty content.

== Geography ==
The Saline River originates in the High Plains of northwestern Kansas. The south fork of the river rises near the Sherman County-Thomas County line while its north fork rises in central Thomas County. The confluence of the two streams lies in Sheridan County roughly 5 miles (8 km) northwest of Grinnell, Kansas. It flows east for 397 miles (639 km) through the Smoky Hills region of north-central Kansas and joins the Smoky Hill River approximately 1 mile south of New Cambria, Kansas in Saline County. The Saline is sluggish and unnavigable with no major tributaries and has a riverbed of sand and mud.

The Saline River drains an area of 3,419 square miles (8,860 km^{2}). The combined Smoky Hill-Saline Basin drains 12,229 square miles (31,670 km^{2}). Via the Smoky Hill, Kansas, and Missouri Rivers, it is part of the Mississippi River watershed.

In Russell County, the river is dammed to form Wilson Lake.

The course of the Saline River runs through these counties:

- Thomas County, Kansas
- Sheridan County, Kansas
- Graham County, Kansas
- Trego County, Kansas
- Ellis County, Kansas
- Russell County, Kansas
- Lincoln County, Kansas
- Ottawa County, Kansas
- Saline County, Kansas

== History ==
The first recorded reference to the Saline River was on October 18, 1724, by French explorer Etienne Venyard de Bourgmont who reported finding a "small river where the water was briny". Bourgmont was on his way to negotiate a peace treaty with the Padouca whose "Grand Village" was then located on the Saline's banks. In 1806, an American expedition led by Zebulon Pike crossed the river on its way to visit the Pawnee. By 1817, the river was known as the "Grand Saline".

The Pawnee and the Kanza, who used the area as hunting and trapping ground, claimed land along the Saline until the 1850s when American settlers began to arrive. The Kansas–Nebraska Act of 1854 established Kansas Territory, which included the entire length of the Saline River. By 1873, the U.S. government had forcibly removed the Kanza to a reservation in Indian Territory (now Oklahoma).

In August 1867, Cheyenne warriors massacred a party of railroad workers in Ellis County, an incident which led to a battle between the Cheyenne and Buffalo Soldiers from Fort Hays that became known as "The Battle of the Saline River".

The Saline River flooded periodically during the late 19th century with particularly destructive floods occurring in 1858, 1867, and 1903. In 1964, the U.S. Army Corps of Engineers dammed the river in eastern Russell County for flood control, creating Wilson Lake.

== See also ==
- List of Kansas rivers
- Smoky Hill River
- Smoky Hills
- Wilson Lake (Kansas)
