= National Register of Historic Places listings in Osborne County, Kansas =

Location of Osborne County in Kansas

This is a list of the National Register of Historic Places listings in Osborne County, Kansas.

This is intended to be a complete list of the properties on the National Register of Historic Places in Osborne County, Kansas, United States. The locations of National Register properties for which the latitude and longitude coordinates are included below, may be seen in a map.

There are 7 properties listed on the National Register in the county.

This National Park Service list is complete through NPS recent listings posted September 4, 2026.

== Current listings ==
	Name on the Register	Image	Date listed	Location	City or town	Description
1	Downs Carnegie Library	Downs Carnegie Library	June 25, 1987 (#87000966)	504 Morgan; 39°30′01″N 98°32′41″W	Downs	
2	Downs Missouri Pacific Depot	Downs Missouri Pacific Depot	October 11, 2001 (#01001093)	710 Railroad St. 39°30′09″N 98°32′36″W	Downs	
3	East Fork Wolf Creek Pratt Truss Bridge	East Fork Wolf Creek Pratt Truss Bridge	May 9, 2003 (#03000361)	W 290th Dr., 0.8 miles (1.3 km) east of its junction with S. 50th Ave., 2 miles (3.2 km) south and 4 miles (6.4 km) east of Cheyenne; 39°08′52″N 98°34′07″W	Delhi	
4	Geodetic Center of the United States	Geodetic Center of the United States	October 9, 1973 (#73000772)	17 miles (27 km) southeast of Osborne off U.S. Route 281 on Meade's Ranch; 39°13′27″N 98°32′31″W	Osborne	
5	Natoma Presbyterian Church	Natoma Presbyterian Church	November 21, 2006 (#06001052)	408 N. 3rd St. 39°11′24″N 99°01′17″W	Natoma	
6	Osborne County Courthouse	Osborne County Courthouse	April 26, 2002 (#02000392)	423 W. Main St. 39°26′16″N 98°42′04″W	Osborne	
7	Osborne Public Carnegie Library	Osborne Public Carnegie Library	June 25, 1987 (#87000967)	307 W. Main; 39°26′16″N 98°41′56″W	Osborne	Now operated by the Osborne County Genealogical and Historical Society

== Former listings ==
	Name on the Register	Image	Date listed	Date removed	Location	City or town	Description
1	IOOF Lodge		May 16, 2002 (#02000491)	February 24, 2012	Junction of Nicholas and Mill Sts. 39°27′21″N 98°56′53″W	Alton	Collapsed on April 11, 2010.

== See also ==
- List of National Historic Landmarks in Kansas
- National Register of Historic Places listings in Kansas
