= Tornado outbreak of June 14–18, 1992 =

Tornado outbreak in the United States

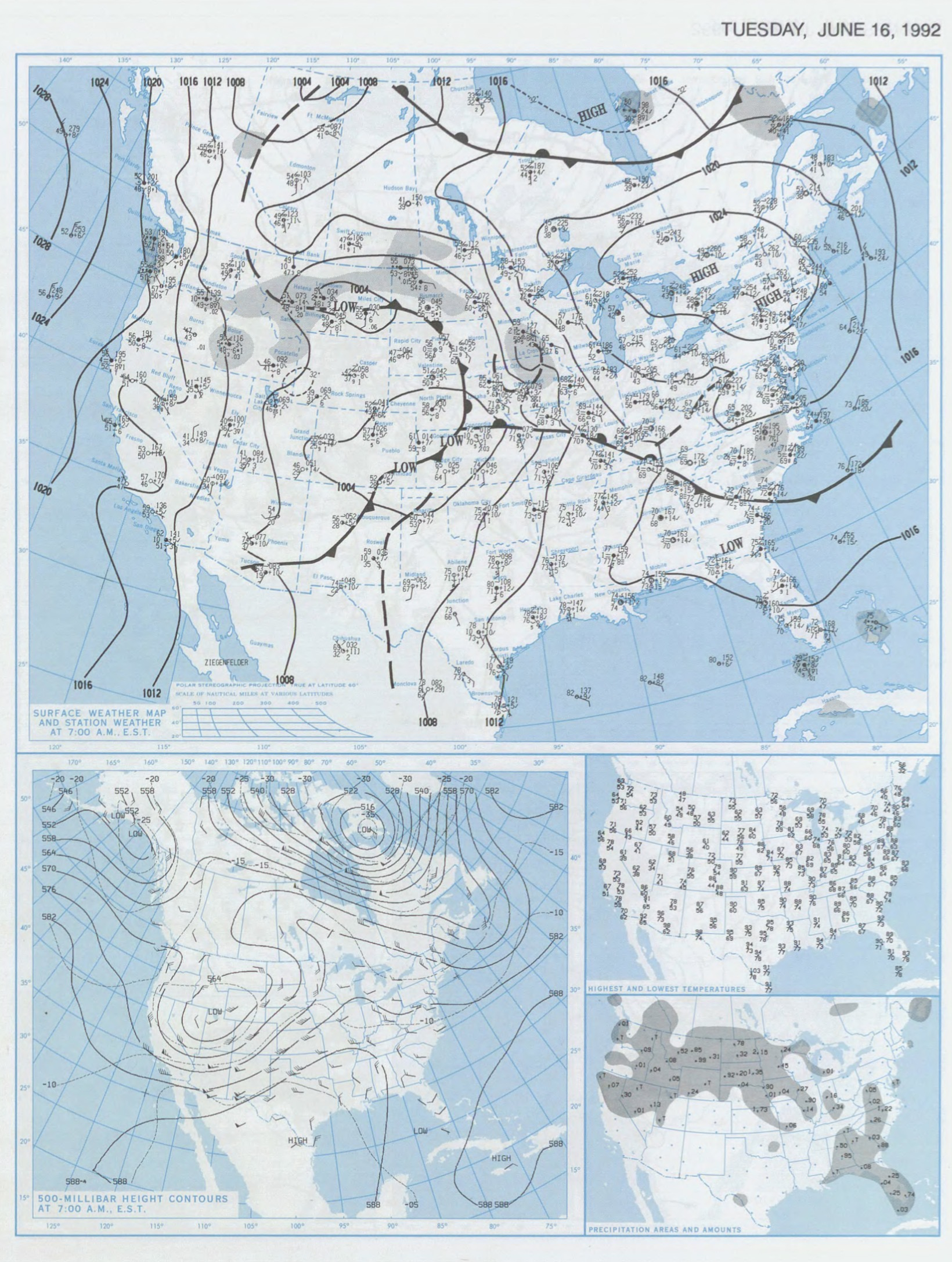
- Weather analysis on June 16, displaying the atmospheric weather features during the tornado outbreak

Meteorological history
- Duration: June 14–18, 1992

Tornado outbreak
- Tornadoes: 170 confirmed (Record for a continuous outbreak in June)
- Max. rating: F5 tornado
- Duration: ~4 days

Overall effects
- Casualties: 1 fatality, 110 injuries
- Damage: $242 million (1992 USD) $570 million (2026 USD)
- Areas affected: Central and Midwestern United States, Florida
- Part of the tornado outbreaks of 1992

The Tornado outbreak of June 14–18, 1992 was one of the largest tornado outbreaks on record, affecting portions of the Central United States from June 14 to June 18, 1992. The outbreak began on June 14 when six tornadoes touched down in Colorado and Idaho. Fifty-eight tornadoes were reported across portions of the Great Plains on June 15, and 65 more were reported over much of the central U.S. on June 16. The 123 tornadoes that touched down on June 15–16 make that two-day span the 5th largest two-day tornado outbreak in U.S. history behind the 1974 Super Outbreak, the May 2004 tornado outbreak sequence, the tornado outbreak of April 14–16, 2011, and the 2011 Super Outbreak. Twenty-eight more tornadoes touched down on June 17, and 13 more touched down on June 18, giving this outbreak 170 confirmed tornadoes.

== Meteorological synopsis ==
A major spring storm began developing in the western United States over the weekend of June 13–14, 1992. The storm ejected a minor upper air impulse across the Northern Plains on June 13, triggering severe weather across the extreme northwest corner of South Dakota. Golf ball sized hail and 10 inches of rain destroyed crops and killed over 500 sheep in Harding County, South Dakota. This event preceded the main storm which still was positioned over the western United States. As the storm moved to the east over the next several days, it caused 170 tornadoes in the central United States, including an F5 tornado in Chandler, Minnesota. The storm system finally began to weaken as it moved to the eastern United States on June 18.

== Outbreak description ==
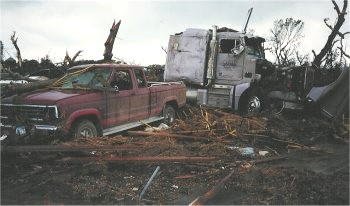
Tornado damage near Leota, Minnesota

On Tuesday, June 16, 1992, eastern South Dakota and southwest Minnesota were heavily impacted by the storm as it moved from the Rocky Mountain Region across the Upper Midwest. At least two dozen tornadoes were reported that day, with more than three times that many reports of large hail and strong winds, causing widespread swaths of damage to crops, buildings, and other personal property across much of eastern South Dakota and southwest Minnesota. The first tornado, spawned by a supercell thunderstorm, touched down in Charles Mix County, South Dakota about 1:00 pm. The last tornado was reported shortly before midnight that evening, ending an 11-hour period of intense severe weather across eastern South Dakota and southwest Minnesota. Until the record was broken in 2010, the 27 tornadoes that touched down in Minnesota on June 16 marked the largest single day tornado outbreak in Minnesota since accurate records started being kept in 1950.

Remarkably, there was only one fatality from this outbreak, that coming from an F5 tornado in Chandler, Minnesota. In addition to the F5, three F4 tornadoes were reported in Murray County, Minnesota, and Mitchell and McPherson counties in Kansas. Damage estimates for the two days were in excess of $160 million.

This outbreak played a large part in a record setting month in June 1992. The 399 tornadoes that touched down in that month was a United States record at the time, breaking the old record of 335 tornadoes set in May 1991. This record was eventually broken, when 543 tornadoes touched down during May 2003. This record, though, would be broken in turn when over 750 tornadoes touched down in April 2011.

== Confirmed tornadoes ==
Confirmed tornadoes by Fujita rating
FU	F0	F1	F2	F3	F4	F5	Total
0	54	64	33	15	3	1	170

=== June 14 event ===
List of confirmed tornadoes
F#	Location	County	Time (UTC)	Path length	Damage
Idaho
F0	E of Burley	Cassia	2202	0 miles	A brief tornado touched down twice.
Colorado
F0	W of Gill	Weld	0026	1 mile (1.6 km)	This tornado occurred near the Greeley–Weld County Airport.
F0	N of Goodrich	Morgan	0027	0 miles	Debris persisted for a few minutes.
F0	SE of Raymer	Morgan	0027	0 miles	This tornado moved three grain bins for 250 yd (230 m).
F0	NE of Barnesville	Weld	0115	0 miles	This and the next event were observed nearly simultaneously.
F0	N of Fort Morgan	Weld	0130	0 miles	See previous event.

=== June 15 event ===
List of confirmed tornadoes
F#	Location	County	Time (UTC)	Path length	Damage
Kansas
F0	NE of Plainville (1st tornado)	Rooks	2115	1 mile (1.6 km)	This tornado occurred over open land.
F1	N of Natoma (1st tornado)	Osborne	2126	1 mile (1.6 km)	Very minimal damage was reported.
F0	E of Zurich	Rooks	2128	1 mile (1.6 km)	One mobile home was destroyed on the eastern outskirts of Plainville.
F1	NE of Plainville (2nd tornado)	Rooks	2137	7 miles (11 km)	This tornado destroyed a double-wide and a feedlot. 30–40 head of cattle died. Two injuries occurred in the double-wide. Grazulis classified the tornado as an F2.
F0	N of Natoma (2nd tornado)	Osborne	2146	0.5 miles (0.80 km)	This tornado lasted only a minute.
F0	SE of Bloomington (1st tornado)	Osborne	2251	0.5 miles (0.80 km)	Tornado occurred over open country.
F1	SE of Bloomington (2nd tornado)	Osborne	2251	2 miles (3.2 km)	Several farms were damaged.
F1	SE of Osborne (1st tornado)	Osborne	2315	0.8 miles (1.3 km)	
F1	SW of Osborne	Osborne	2334–2337	1 mile (1.6 km)	
F1	S of Osborne	Osborne	2340	1 mile (1.6 km)	This tornado felled a number of large trees.
F1	Osborne area	Osborne	2345	0.5 miles (0.80 km)	Trees and roofs were badly damaged.
F1	SE of Osborne (2nd tornado)	Osborne	2355	1 mile (1.6 km)	
F2	SE of Corinth	Mitchell	2356	3.5 miles (5.6 km)	
F1	SE of Mankato	Jewell	2359	1 mile (1.6 km)	
F2	NE of Tipton (1st tornado)	Mitchell	0002	3 miles (4.8 km)	
F1	SW of Webber	Jewell	0006	2 miles (3.2 km)	
F1	NE of Tipton (2nd tornado)	Mitchell	0007	1.5 miles (2.4 km)	
F2	E of Mankato	Jewell	0009	1.5 miles (2.4 km)	
F2	E of Tipton	Mitchell	0010	4 miles (6.4 km)	
F4	SW of Beloit (1st tornado)	Mitchell	0030	3 miles (4.8 km)	
F1	NW of Lovewell	Jewell	0035	1.5 miles (2.4 km)	
F2	SW of Beloit (2nd tornado)	Mitchell	0035	2 miles (3.2 km)	
F2	SW of Beloit (3rd tornado)	Mitchell	0038	2 miles (3.2 km)	
F1	SW of Beloit (4th tornado)	Mitchell	0040	2 miles (3.2 km)	
F3	SW of Beloit (5th tornado)	Mitchell	0045	2 miles (3.2 km)	
F1	SW of Beloit (6th tornado)	Mitchell	0055	1.5 miles (2.4 km)	
F0	N of Republic	Republic	0100	0.5 miles (0.80 km)	
F1	SW of Beloit (7th tornado)	Mitchell	0105	1.3 miles (2.1 km)	
F1	SW of Simpson	Mitchell	0135	2 miles (3.2 km)	
F1	SE of Simpson	Cloud	0152	2 miles (3.2 km)	
F1	NE of Simpson	Cloud	0158	2 miles (3.2 km)	
F1	S of Delphos	Ottawa	0235	1 mile (1.6 km)	
F3	W of Delphos	Ottawa	0252	3 miles (4.8 km)	
F4	McPherson	McPherson	0335	6 miles (9.7 km)	
F1	NW of Miltonvale	Cloud	0337	1 mile (1.6 km)	
F2	Roxbury	McPherson	0340	7 miles (11 km)	
F1	SE of Roxbury to NW of Ramona	McPherson, Marion	0509	17 miles (27 km)	
F1	SW of Elmo	Dickinson	0520	2 miles (3.2 km)	
F0	SW of Abilene	Dickinson	0538	0.1 miles (0.16 km)	
F1	E of Enterprise	Dickinson	0648	1 mile (1.6 km)	
F0	S of Solomon	Dickinson	0705	1.5 miles (2.4 km)	
South Dakota
F2	S of Philip	Haakon	2210	2 miles (3.2 km)	
F0	NE of Raymond	Clark	0005	0.2 miles (0.32 km)	
F0	SE of Bristol	Day	0250	0.5 miles (0.80 km)	
Nebraska
F1	Doniphan	Hall	0020	0.1 miles (0.16 km)	
F2	SW of Osceola	Polk	0045	2 miles (3.2 km)	
F2	N of Hampton	Hamilton	0055	0.1 miles (0.16 km)	
F0	N of Schuyler (1st tornado)	Colfax	0115	0.1 miles (0.16 km)	
F2	N of Schuyler (2nd tornado)	Colfax	0115	0.1 miles (0.16 km)	
F3	SE of Milligan to W of Milford	Saline, Seward	0155	21 miles (34 km)	
F1	W of West Point	Cuming	0250	0.5 miles (0.80 km)	
F1	SW of West Point	Cuming	0255	0.5 miles (0.80 km)	
F1	SE of West Point	Cuming	0300	4 miles (6.4 km)	
F3	W of Malcolm	Seward	0315	14 miles (23 km)	
F1	N of Bancroft	Cuming	0320	0.5 miles (0.80 km)	
F1	NW of Tecumseh	Johnson	0458	1.5 miles (2.4 km)	
F1	NW of Johnson	Johnson	0512	1.2 miles (1.9 km)	
F1	SW of Burr	Otoe	0530	1.5 miles (2.4 km)	
Sources: Tornado History Project Storm Data - June 15, 1992

=== June 16 event ===
List of confirmed tornadoes
F#	Location	County	Time (UTC)	Path length	Damage
South Dakota
F2	W of Mitchell (1st tornado)	Davison	1930	3 miles (4.8 km)	
F2	W of Mitchell (2nd tornado)	Davison	1930	3 miles (4.8 km)	
F0	NE of Letcher	Sanborn	2023	0.1 miles (0.16 km)	
F2	SW of Fedora	Miner	2025	0.5 miles (0.80 km)	
F3	SW of Oldham	Miner	2045	3 miles (4.8 km)	
F3	S of Arlington	Kingsbury, Brookings	2135	4 miles (6.4 km)	
F0	W of Oldham	Kingsbury	2137	0.1 miles (0.16 km)	
F3	W of Fort Thompson	Buffalo	2215	2 miles (3.2 km)	
F0	SW of Pickstown	Charles Mix	0003	0.3 miles (0.48 km)	
F0	NE of Tripp	Hutchinson	0110	0.3 miles (0.48 km)	
F1	Bridgewater (1st tornado)	McCook	0130	0.5 miles (0.80 km)	
F1	Bridgewater (2nd tornado)	McCook	0130	0.5 miles (0.80 km)	
F1	Brookings area	Brookings	0130	7 miles (11 km)	
F1	NE of Rutland	Lake	0145	1 mile (1.6 km)	
F0	SW of Centerville	Clay	0150	0.5 miles (0.80 km)	
F2	Colton	Minnehaha	0200	5 miles (8.0 km)	
Iowa
F1	NE of Cedar Falls	Black Hawk	2003	4.7 miles (7.6 km)	
F3	NW of Logan to N of Dow City	Harrison, Crawford	0230	26 miles (42 km)	
F0	SE of Perkins	Sioux	0255	0.2 miles (0.32 km)	
F0	S of Ida Grove	Ida	0348	0.1 miles (0.16 km)	
F0	NE of Soldier	Monona	0401	0.1 miles (0.16 km)	
F2	NE of Oakland	Pottawattamie	0500	4 miles (6.4 km)	
F2	SW of Dumfries	Mills	0514	3 miles (4.8 km)	
F0	Harlan area	Shelby	0545	0.2 miles (0.32 km)	
Nebraska
F0	SW of Hemingford	Box Butte	2120	0.1 miles (0.16 km)	
F0	W of Alliance	Box Butte	2151	0.1 miles (0.16 km)	
F1	SE of Ainsworth	Brown	2215	4 miles (6.4 km)	
F1	N of Newport	Rock	2315	1 mile (1.6 km)	
F1	SW of Anselmo	Custer	2317	0.5 miles (0.80 km)	
F0	SE of Anselmo	Custer	2323	0.2 miles (0.32 km)	
F1	NW of Gates	Custer	2335	0.4 miles (0.64 km)	
F1	SE of Naper	Boyd	2338	1.5 miles (2.4 km)	
F1	NE of Butte	Boyd	2350	10 miles (16 km)	
F1	Hartington	Cedar	0147	0.1 miles (0.16 km)	
F2	NE of Oakland	Burt	0400	4 miles (6.4 km)	
F0	S of Western	Saline	0405	0.1 miles (0.16 km)	
F0	NE of Waverly	Lancaster	0423	0.1 miles (0.16 km)	
Minnesota
F5	S of Leota to E of Lake Wilson	Nobles, Murray, Lyon	2200	35 miles (56 km)	1 death – See article on this tornado – 40+ people were injured.
F4	E of Lake Wilson	Murray	2218	7 miles (11 km)	
F3	S of Clarkfield	Yellow Medicine	2230	6 miles (9.7 km)	
F2	NE of Hadley	Murray	2230	13 miles (21 km)	
F3	NW of Currie	Murray, Lyon	2300	12 miles (19 km)	
F2	E of Amiret	Lyon	2318	2 miles (3.2 km)	
F3	NE of Tracy	Redwood	2325	16 miles (26 km)	
F1	SW of Milroy	Redwood	2355	0.1 miles (0.16 km)	
F2	NE of Danvers	Swift	2358	1.5 miles (2.4 km)	
F3	W of Wabasso	Redwood	0010	13 miles (21 km)	
F2	N of Vesta	Redwood	0025	12 miles (19 km)	
F2	S of Delhi	Redwood	0025	8 miles (13 km)	
F1	W of Redwood Falls	Redwood	0030	6.5 miles (10.5 km)	
F2	E of Delhi	Redwood	0040	5.5 miles (8.9 km)	
F2	W of Bechyn	Renville	0050	5 miles (8.0 km)	
F2	NW of Bechyn	Renville	0125	3 miles (4.8 km)	
F2	W of Sacred Heart	Renville	0200	2.5 miles (4.0 km)	
F1	NW of Jasper	Pipestone	0200	0.5 miles (0.80 km)	
F2	S of Chandler	Murray	0210	4 miles (6.4 km)	
F2	W of Slayton	Murray	0220	0.5 miles (0.80 km)	
F3	SE of Clarkfield	Yellow Medicine	0240	2.5 miles (4.0 km)	
F2	S of Danube	Renville	0330	2 miles (3.2 km)	
F2	E of Westbrook	Cottonwood	0330	7.5 miles (12.1 km)	
F1	SE of Leavenworth	Brown	0400	1 mile (1.6 km)	
F3	Cokato	Wright	0410	10 miles (16 km)	
F2	N of Maple Lake	Wright	0420	10 miles (16 km)	
F2	NW of Foley	Benton	0450	0.3 miles (0.48 km)	
North Dakota
F0	E of Bismarck	Burleigh	2320	0.1 miles (0.16 km)	
Sources: Tornado History Project Storm Data - June 16, 1992

== Non-tornadic events ==
In addition to the severe weather, another devastating weather event was taking place across northeastern South Dakota. Heavy rains were occurring in an area already saturated by previous rains. Over a two- to three-day period in mid-June 1992, 15 to 20 inches of rain fell in the Clear Lake-Watertown area of northeast South Dakota, resulting in widespread flooding throughout the area, and major downstream flooding of the Big Sioux River.

== See also ==
- List of Minnesota weather records
- List of F5 and EF5 tornadoes
- List of North American tornadoes and tornado outbreaks
- List of Storm Prediction Center high risk days
