= Richard Foster (abolitionist) =

American abolitionist and Congregational clergy (1826–1901)

Richard Baxter Foster
- Born: October 25, 1826; Hanover, New Hampshire, U.S.
- Died: March 30, 1901 (aged 74); Okarche, Oklahoma, U.S.
- Occupation(s): College principal, minister

Richard Baxter Foster (October 25, 1826 – March 30, 1901) was an American abolitionist, Union Army officer, and initial head of a college for African Americans in Jefferson City, Missouri. During the American Civil War, Foster volunteered to be an officer for the 1st Missouri Regiment of Colored Infantry regiment of the U.S. Army, largely recruited in Missouri, and helped set up educational program for its soldiers. In 1866 Foster headed the new college in Jefferson City, the Lincoln Institute, with financial support from his former regiment. The college is now named Lincoln University.

== Early life and education ==
Foster was born in Hanover, New Hampshire, on October 25, 1826, to Richard and Irene Bourroughs Foster. He was educated in Congregationalist schools, including Henniker Academy, and graduated from Dartmouth College in 1851.

== Activism ==
After college, Foster moved to Illinois and then to Iowa and taught in schools for African Americans. In 1856, he joined abolitionist John Brown in a series of attacks on proslavery settlements in Kansas known as Bleeding Kansas. Foster later moved to Nebraska and in 1862 enlisted in the 1st Regiment Nebraska Volunteer Infantry to fight in the American Civil War (1861–1865). After African-American soldiers were authorized to join the Union Army in 1863, Foster volunteered to serve as an officer for a black regiment. He was commissioned a first lieutenant and joined the 1st Missouri Regiment of Colored Infantry (later redesignated as the 62nd Regiment of U.S. Colored Troops). While an officer, Foster led in the education of the soldiers, many of whom were former slaves. The regiment was stationed in Louisiana and Texas and took part in the Battle of Palmito Ranch. It also saw numerous casualties due to disease. Foster was mustered out in January 1866.

== Lincoln Institute ==
After the war, Foster and other officers and soldiers of his regiment, together with the 2nd Missouri Regiment of Colored Infantry, organized and raised money to create a school for former slaves in Missouri. Foster advocated that the reopening of Central Methodist University include allowing black students to join, but he was rebuffed. He moved to Jefferson City, Missouri, and after some difficulty opened the Lincoln Institute with two students on September 17, 1866. The school struggled financially, and Foster employed Charles A. Beal, Henry Ward Beecher, and Frederick Douglass to serve as fundraisers with some success. Foster served as the school's president and sole teacher until 1868, when he hired W. H. Payne, an African American, to teach. Foster advocated that the school share in federal money set aside for higher education by the 1862 Morrill Land-Grant Acts establishing land-grant universities. This plan was rejected, but with the help of politicians James Milton Turner and Moses Dickson, it gained increased state funding, with the condition that Foster raise $15,000 first. With the help of the Western Sanitary Commission and the Freedmen's Bureau, Foster raised the money, and the school's finances were greatly improved. Under the Morrill Act of 1890, Missouri designated the school as a land-grant university, emphasizing agriculture, mechanics, and teaching.

Foster left the position as principal of the school in 1870 and 1871 in favor of Payne, but returned to become principal for part of 1871.

== Ministry ==
He left the school in 1871 and in May 1872 was ordained a minister in Osborne, Kansas, although he had been licensed to preach already in 1868. He led the First Congregational Church there for ten years. While at Osborne, he was also acting pastor at churches in Bethany (1873 and 1876–1881), Corinth (1875–1874), Bloomington (1875 and 1879–1881), Rose Valley (1876–1879), and Dial (1880–1882). From 1882 to 1884, he led a Congregational church in Red Cliff, Colorado. From 1884 to 1886, he led a church in Milford, Kansas, and from 1886 to 1890 in Cheney, Kansas. In 1890, he went to Stillwater, Oklahoma, where he organized a church, which he led until 1894. He then led a church in Perkins, Oklahoma, until 1896, before going on to a church in Okarche, Oklahoma, until 1898. He also continued to teach, lecturing later in his life at Kingfisher College.

Foster died in Okarche, Oklahoma, on March 30, 1901.

== Personal life ==
In 1891, Foster was awarded an honorary doctor of divinity degree by Howard University.

On October 23, 1851, in Brooklyn, Illinois, Foster married Jemine Ewing, daughter of John Logan Ewing and Elizabeth Cleland, with whom he had one son. Jemine died on October 3, 1853, in Jacksonvville. Foster's second marriage was at Clay, Iowa, on March 8, 1855, to Lucy Reed, daughter of Festus Reed and Sarah Ann Woodruff. With Lucy, Foster had eight sons and two daughters.

== Bibliography ==
- What is Congregationalism? (1892)
- What do Congregationalists Believe? (1896)
