= Round Mound =

Round Mound may refer to:

- Round Mound of Rebound
- Round Mound of Sound (disambiguation)
- Roundmound, Kansas
