= Osborne Public Carnegie Library =

- U.S. National Register of Historic Places
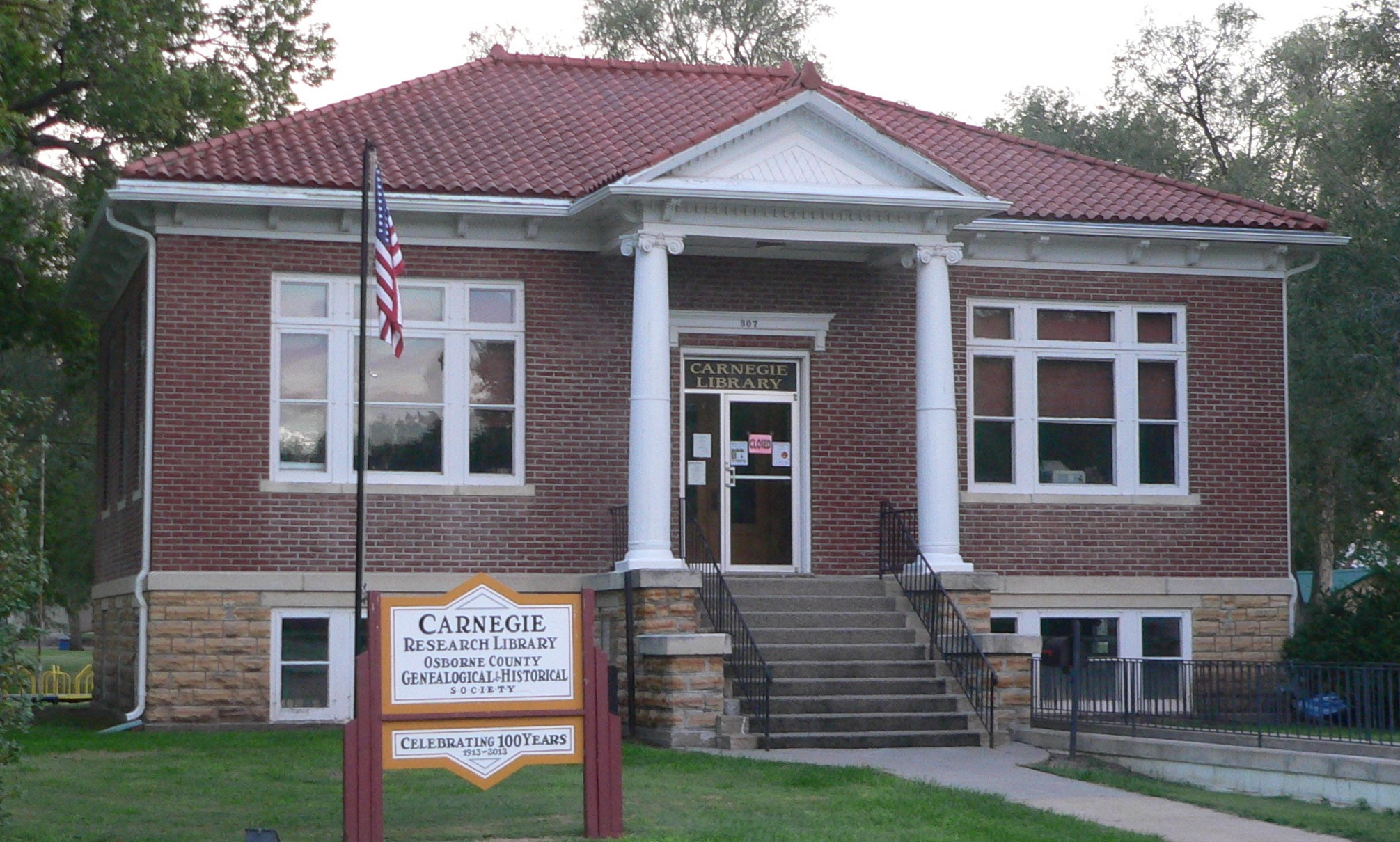

- Location within Kansas
- Location: 307 W. Main
- Coordinates: 39.4378838°N 98.69893°W
- Area: less than one acre
- Built: c.1913
- Built by: W.N. Penland
- Architectural style: Classical Revival
- MPS: Carnegie Libraries of Kansas TR
- NRHP reference No.: 87000967
- Added to NRHP: June 25, 1987

The Osborne Public Carnegie Library is a historic Carnegie library in Osborne, Kansas. It was built around 1913 and was listed on the National Register of Historic Places in 1987.

It is located at Third and Main in Osborne, the county seat of Osborne County.

It is Classical Revival in style, and is a one-story ted brick building built upon a raised limestone block foundation. It has a ridge hipped roof with its "original pantiles and ridge caps." It is 46 by 32 feet (14.0 m × 9.8 m) in plan, not including its projecting entryway flanked by two Ionic columns.

It served as the town's public library from 1912 to 1995, and later, including in 2022, has served as a regional history and genealogical library operated by the Osborne County Genealogical and Historical Society.
