= Potterville, Kansas =

- Ghost town
- Location within the state of Kansas Potterville (the United States)
- Coordinates: 39°14′06″N 98°37′15″W
- Country: United States
- State: Kansas
- County: Osborne
- Elevation: 1,946 ft (593 m)

Population
  - Total: 0
- Time zone: UTC-6 (CST)
  - Summer (DST): UTC-5 (CDT)
- Area code: 785
- GNIS ID: 481978

Potterville is a ghost town in Winfield Township, Osborne County, Kansas, United States.

== History ==
Potterville was issued a post office in 1874. The post office was discontinued in 1903. There is nothing left of Potterville.
