= Forney, Kansas =

- Ghost town
- Location within Kansas Location within the United States
- Coordinates: 39°24′56″N 98°37′12″W
- Country: United States
- State: Kansas
- County: Osborne
- Elevation: 1,522 ft (464 m)

Population
  - Total: 0
- Time zone: UTC-6 (CST)
  - Summer (DST): UTC-5 (CDT)
- Area code: 785
- GNIS ID: 484593

Forney is a ghost town in Osborne County, Kansas, United States.

== History ==
Forney was a private tin and wood grain elevator erected in 1901 by Aaron H. Forney on his farm in southeastern Penn Township, along the railroad passing through his property. It was taken down in the 1980s. Because there was an elevator, people assumed for many years that there was a former town at the site, but this is incorrect. The closest thing to a settlement or community in the region was a mile north of the Forney elevator, where in the early 1870s Alfred N. Fritchey tried to establish the townsite of Fritchey City, but failed in the attempt.
