= Cheyenne, Kansas =

- Ghost town
- Location within Kansas Location within the United States
- Coordinates: 39°10′36″N 98°38′20″W
- Country: United States
- State: Kansas
- County: Osborne
- Elevation: 1,683 ft (513 m)

Population
  - Total: 0
- Time zone: UTC-6 (CST)
  - Summer (DST): UTC-5 (CDT)
- Area code: 785
- GNIS ID: 484602

Cheyenne is a ghost town in Jackson Township, Osborne County, Kansas, United States.

== History ==
Cheyenne was issued a post office in 1879. The post office was discontinued in 1907.
