= U.S. Route 281 =

Highway in the United States

U.S. Route 281
- US 281 highlighted in red

Route information
- Auxiliary route of US 81
- Length: 1,875 mi (3,018 km)
- Existed: 1931–present

Major junctions
- South end: Bus. US 77 / SH 48 at Brownsville, TX
- I-2 / I-69C at Pharr, TX; I-37 at Three Rivers, TX; I-10 / I-35 at San Antonio, TX; I-20 near Brazos, TX; I-44 from Wichita Falls, TX to Randlett, OK; I-40 at Hinton, OK; I-70 at Russell, KS; I-80 at Grand Island, NE; I-90 at Plankinton, SD; I-94 at Jamestown, ND
- North end: ND 3 / PTH 10 at the U.S.–Canada border near Dunseith, ND

Location
- Country: United States
- States: Texas, Oklahoma, Kansas, Nebraska, South Dakota, North Dakota

Highway system
- United States Numbered Highway System; List; Special; Divided

U.S. Route 281 (US 281) is a north–south United States Numbered Highway. At 1,875 miles (3,018 km) it is the longest continuous three-digit U.S. Route.

The highway's northern terminus is at the International Peace Garden, north of Dunseith, North Dakota, at the Canadian border, where it continues as Highway 10. The route between Dunseith and the border is shared with North Dakota Highway 3. US 281 has two southern termini. The western terminus, known as International Boulevard in Hidalgo, begins from the McAllen–Hidalgo International Bridge. The southern eastern terminus of US 281 is in Brownsville, Texas, just short of the Mexican border ending on Bus. 77. The two spurs come together at South Cage Boulevard in Las Milpas, Texas going north into Pharr, Texas. Thus, US 281 is the only continuous three-digit US route to extend from the Canadian border to the Mexican border.

The original Military Telegraph Road was incorporated into the US-281 route.

US 281 is a "child" of US 81. As a result of decommissioning portions of the parent route that have been superseded by concurrent Interstate Highways, the length of US 281 is 672 miles (1,081 km) greater than that of its parent, and US 281 no longer connects to its "parent", US 81.

== Route description ==
=== Texas ===
US 281, beginning at the west, or the lower Rio Grande Valley, at an intersection with Business US 77 and SH 48 about two miles (3.2 km) from the Mexico border. It travels along close to the border through the Rio Grande Valley. At the east, or Upper Rio Grande Valley, turning north from Hidalgo, traveling through Las Milpas, Pharr, Edinburg, and many small towns while also having a Border Patrol checkpoint in Brooks County south of Falfurrias, Texas. It is alternating as a divided highway and main street, until joining I-37. It splits with I-37 and travels through Pleasanton as Business 281, travelling north to San Antonio. In San Antonio, US 281 overlaps I-410 on the south side of the city until the interchange with I-37. US 281 and I-37 then overlap north into downtown San Antonio until I-37 ends at I-35. US 281 continues north from downtown San Antonio as a freeway, intersecting I-410 again on the north side of the city, with access to the San Antonio International Airport. A project to construct a stack interchange at I-410 (the "San Antonio Web") was completed June 9, 2008; formerly there was no direct access between the two freeways and surface streets were required travel between the freeways. North of San Antonio, US 281 is not a freeway and forms the Main Street of Blanco. It overlaps US 290 south of Johnson City. US 290 continues toward Austin, so US 281 and US 290 between San Antonio and Austin are available as a scenic and less congested alternate to I-35.

North of San Antonio, US 281 continues through central and north-central Texas, passing through many towns, including Stephenville, Mineral Wells and Jacksboro before reaching Wichita Falls, where the highway begins a concurrency with I-44 north across the Red River into Oklahoma.

=== Oklahoma ===
US 281 enters the state of Oklahoma at the Red River bridge north of Burkburnett, Texas on a route concurrent with I-44 starting in Wichita Falls. About six miles (9.7 km) north of the Red River, US 281 leaves I-44 at Randlett and follows a two-lane roadway parallel to the newer I-44, which becomes the Wichita Falls–Lawton section of the H.E. Bailey Turnpike, from Randlett to a point six miles (9.7 km) south of Lawton.

Through the Lawton/Fort Sill metropolitan area, US 281 again overlaps a toll-free section of I-44, while the former US 281 alignment through the city of Lawton is designated as Business US 281 between I-44 exits 34 and 39B. About eight miles (13 km) north of downtown Lawton, US 281 departs from I-44 to continue north through the cities of Apache, Anadarko, Gracemont, Binger and Hinton. About two miles (3.2 km) north of its junction with I-40 near Hinton, US 281 crosses a 1930s-vintage 38-span steel pony truss bridge over the South Canadian River that served traffic of the former east–west US 66 before that highway was superseded by I-40 in the 1960s. A four-mile (6.4 km) section of US 281's paving from north of I-40 to a point south of Geary is the original 18-foot (5.5 m) concrete surface of US 66.

Through central and northern Oklahoma, US 281 then proceeds through the cities of Geary, Watonga, Seiling, Waynoka and Alva. The highway crosses the Kansas state line about 14 miles (23 km) north of Alva at Hardtner, Kansas.

=== Kansas ===
Passing largely through sparsely populated areas of central Kansas, US 281 enters the state at Hardtner in Barber County and passes through Medicine Lodge, Pratt, St. John and Great Bend, the only city along the route in Kansas, which has more than 7,000 people. Along its venture through southern Kansas, US 281 intersects several major east–west routes: first US 54 and US 400, which heads east to Wichita and west to Dodge City, Garden City and Liberal; US 50, which veers east to Hutchinson and west to Garden City; and US 56, heading to Dodge City westbound and Overland Park eastbound.

Following a four-mile (6 km) concurrency with K-4 near Hoisington, the highway intersects I-70 at Russell before joining K-18 near Paradise for an eight-mile (13 km) concurrency.

The two highways split at Luray, and US 281 turns north into Osborne County, passing through the town of Osborne before joining US 24 and K-9 for another concurrency. US 281 joins US 36 at Smith Center, turning east before the two highways split; US 281 turns north for its final stretch in the state, passing through Lebanon and the geographic center of the lower 48 states.. All sections of US 281 in Kansas are two-lane. The last stretches of the highway overlaid with bricks, through downtown Pratt and Hoisington, were resurfaced with asphalt and concrete in the 2010s.

=== Nebraska ===
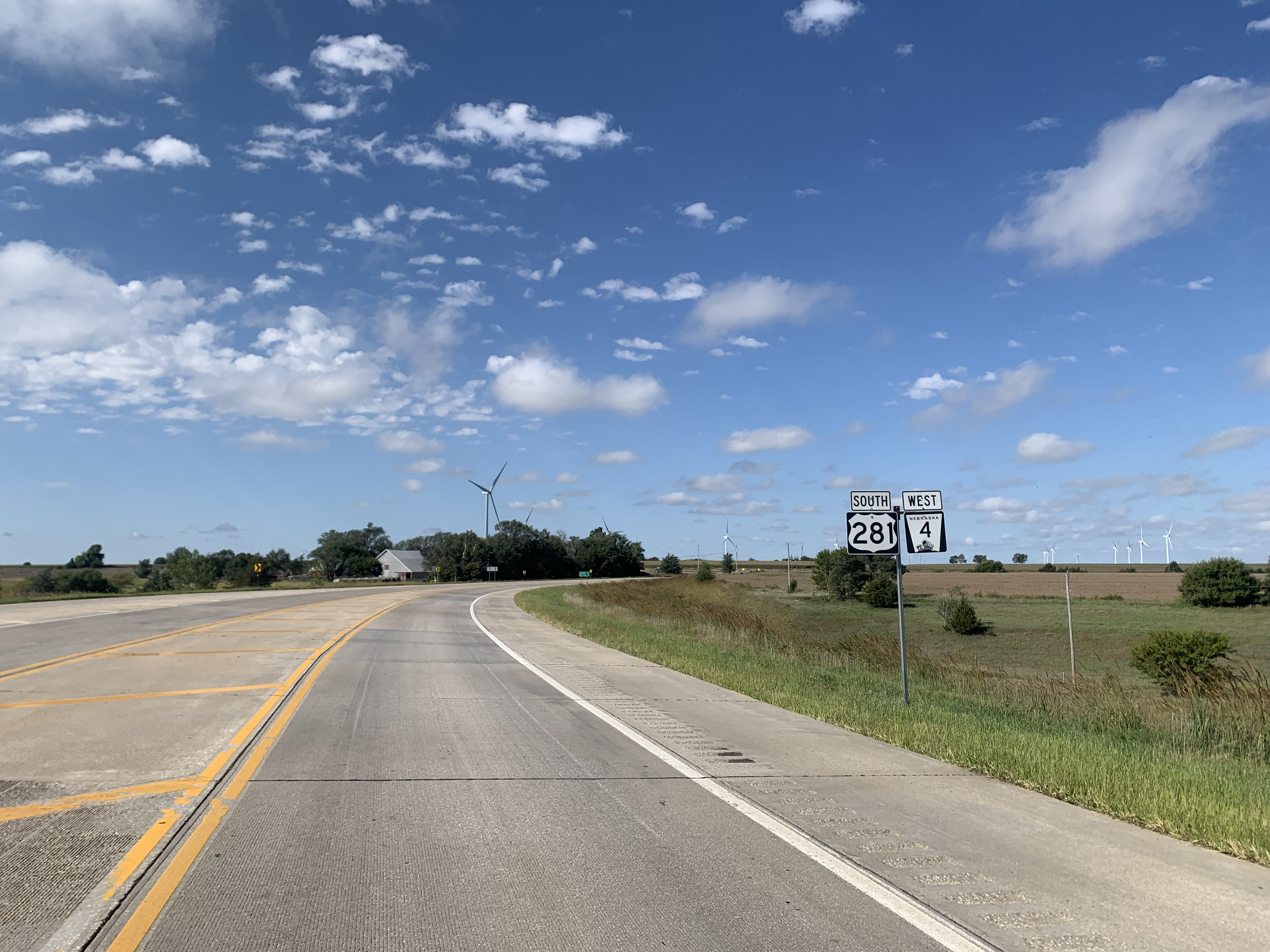
US Highway 281 in Webster County, Nebraska

US 281 enters Nebraska south of Red Cloud and meets US 136 there. It continues north to Hastings and meets US 6 and US 34. Between Hastings and Grand Island, US 281 overlaps US 34 as a divided highway and is designated the Tom Osborne Expressway after the former Nebraska Cornhuskers football coach and U.S. Representative, who is a native of Hastings.

At Grand Island, US 281 intersects I-80, loses US 34 and intersects US 30. US 281 continues north of Grand Island to St. Libory as American Legion Memorial Highway. From there northward, US 281 is a two-lane undivided highway passing mostly through unpopulated areas, with the exception of the regional trade center O'Neill, where it junctions US 20 and US 275. US 281 exits the state north of Spencer.

=== South Dakota ===
US 281 enters South Dakota in Gregory County. Just north of the South Dakota-Nebraska border, it is cosigned with US 18. It crosses the Missouri River at Fort Randall Dam. Just south of Armour, US 18 leaves the US 281 alignment. North of Armour, US 281 makes a short jaunt west on South Dakota Highway 44, then continues north. US 281 and I-90 intersect at Plankinton. On both sides of Wolsey, US 14 is cosigned with US 281 for a stretch of seven miles (11 km) - from 3 miles south of Wolsey to 4 miles north of town. US 281 becomes an expressway at South Dakota Highway 20. This expressway continues through Aberdeen to a point near Westport. South Dakota Highway 10 is cosigned with US 281 for three miles (4.8 km) near Barnard. It exits the state north of Frederick.

US 281 was recently realigned in the city of Aberdeen. A bypass was built that travels on the west side of Aberdeen, and the US 281 designation was moved onto that new roadway. It runs north from US 12 and connects with the old alignment south of 24th Avenue Northeast.

The South Dakota section of US 281, with the exception of concurrencies with US 18 and US 14, is defined at South Dakota Codified Laws § 31-4-229.

=== North Dakota ===
In North Dakota, US 281 is a major north–south artery. It enters south of Ellendale and intersects I-94 and US 52 at Jamestown. US 281 and US 52 remain paired together to Carrington. From there, US 281 continues northward through Sheyenne. Ten miles (16 km) north of Sheyenne, the highway curves in order to go around Devil's Lake, and it then continues to west of Minnewaukan, North Dakota. From there it goes to North Dakota Highway 5 at Rocklake. US 281 follows ND 5 westward to Dunseith, where the highway turns north in concurrence with North Dakota Highway 3 to its end at the Canadian border in the International Peace Garden. The northernmost section of US 281 passes through North Dakota's Turtle Mountains. Recently, US 281 was rebuilt near Minnewaukan, North Dakota to accommodate flooding close to the city.

== Future ==
US 281 will be upgraded between US 59 in George West in Texas to I-2 in Pharr to become I-69C, a spur of I-69. An 18-mile (29 km) segment exists running from Business US 281 in Edinburg to I-2 in Pharr.

US 281 between Grand Island and St. Paul in Nebraska is planned to be a four-lane expressway for its entire length. Currently, some sections are still two lanes, with stubs and grading in place for expansion to four lanes in these areas.

== Major intersections ==
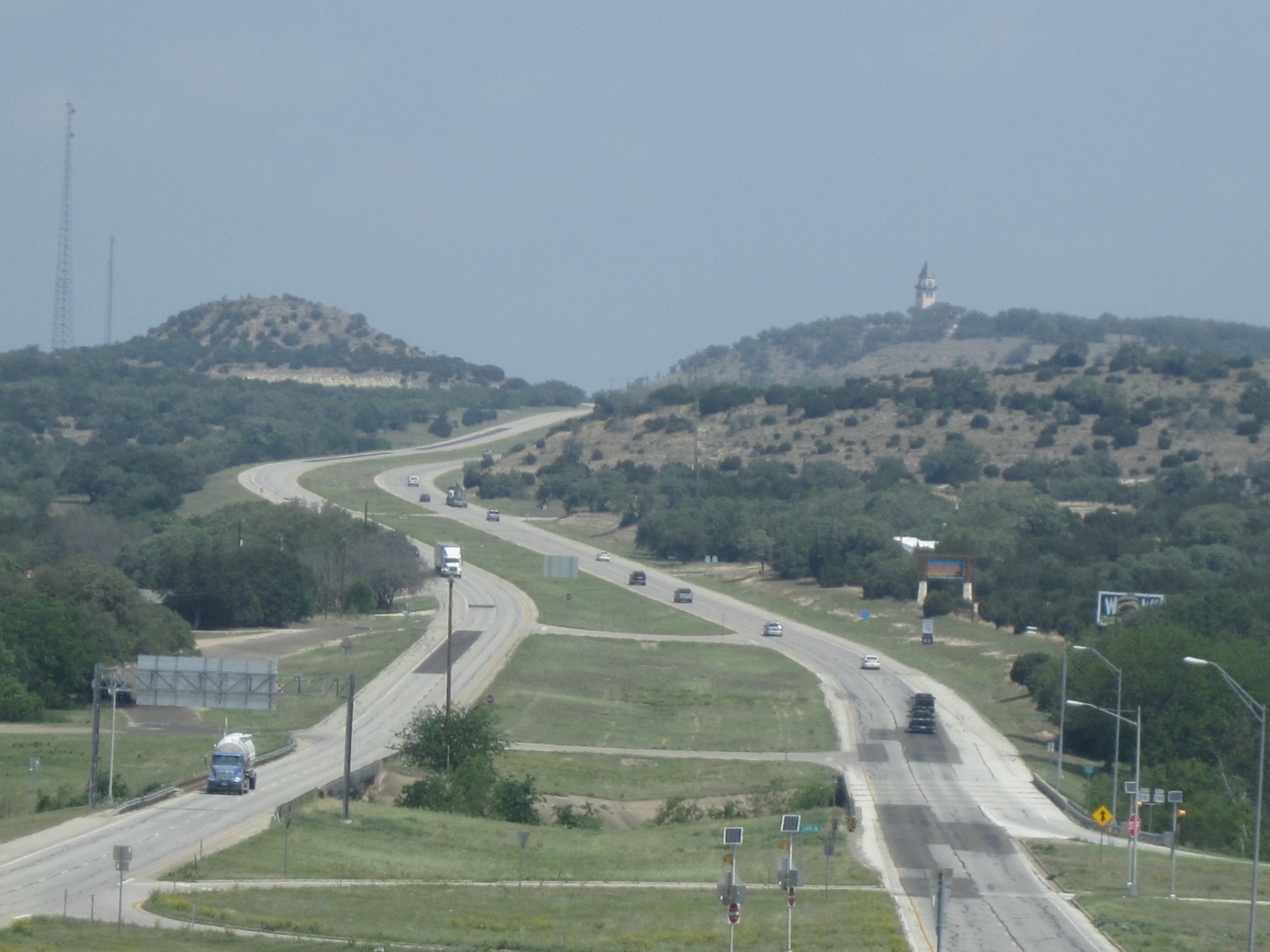
US 281 between San Antonio and Johnson City, Texas

Texas
Bus. US 77 / SH 48 in Brownsville
I-2 / I-69C / US 83 in Pharr. I-69C/US 281 travels concurrently to Edinburg. They will travel concurrently to George West

Future I-69W / US 59 / Future I-69C in George West
I-37 north of Three Rivers. The highways travel concurrently to southeast of Pleasanton.
I-410 in San Antonio. The highways travel concurrently through San Antonio.
I-37 / I-410 in San Antonio. I-37/US 281 travels concurrently through San Antonio.
I-10 / US 87 / US 90 in San Antonio
I-35 / I-37 in San Antonio
I-410 in San Antonio
Texas State Highway Loop 1604 in San Antonio
US 290 south-southeast of Johnson City. The highways travel concurrently to Johnson City.
US 183 / US 190 in Lampasas. The highways travel concurrently through Lampasas.
US 84 in Evant
US 67 in Stephenville
US 377 in Stephenville
I-20 south-southeast of Brazos
US 180 in Mineral Wells
US 380 south-southeast of Jacksboro. The highways travel concurrently to Jacksboro.
US 82 / US 287 in Wichita Falls. The highways travel concurrently through Wichita Falls.
US 82 / US 277 in Wichita Falls. US 277/US 281 travels concurrently to east of Medicine Park, Oklahoma.
I-44 in Wichita Falls. The highways travel concurrently to west-southwest of Randlett, Oklahoma.
Oklahoma
I-44 / US 70 west-southwest of Randlett. US 70/US 281 travels concurrently to Randlett.
I-44 in Walters
I-44 northwest of Geronimo. The highways travel concurrently to east of Medicine Park.
US 62 in Lawton. The highways travel concurrently to Anadarko.
I-40 in Hinton
US 270 in Geary. The highways travel concurrently to Seiling.
US 60 in Seiling. The highways travel concurrently to Chester.
US 412 south of Waynoka
US 64 in Alva. The highways travel concurrently through Alva.
Kansas
US 160 west-southwest of Medicine Lodge. The highways travel concurrently to Medicine Lodge.
US 54 / US 400 in Pratt
US 50 south of St. John
US 56 in Great Bend
I-70 / US 40 south of Russell
US 24 in Osborne. The highways travel concurrently to south of Portis.
US 36 in Smith Center. The highways travel concurrently to south of Lebanon.
Nebraska
US 136 in Red Cloud
US 6 / US 34 in Hastings. US 6/US 281 travels concurrently through Hastings. US 34/US 281 travels concurrently to Grand Island.
I-80 south of Grand Island
N-2 in Grand Island. The highways travel concurrently from the junction of US 34/US 281 to the north end of Grand Island.
US 20 / US 275 in O'Neill. US 20/US 281 travels concurrently through O'Neill.
South Dakota
US 18 east-southeast of Fairfax. The highways travel concurrently to south of Armour.
I-90 southeast of Plankinton
US 14 south-southeast of Wolsey. The highways travel concurrently to north-northwest of Wolsey.
US 212 in Redfield. The highways travel concurrently through Redfield.
US 12 in Aberdeen
North Dakota
I-94 / US 52 in Jamestown. I-94/US 281 travels concurrently through Jamestown. US 52/US 281 travels concurrently to Carrington.
US 2 west-northwest of Churchs Ferry. The highways travel concurrently to west of Churchs Ferry.
ND 3 / PTH 10 at the Canada–United States border north-northeast of Dunseith

== Bypass ==
U.S. Highway 281 Alternate
- Location: Great Bend, Kansas
- Length: 1.4 mi (2.3 km)
- Existed: c. 1955–c. 1983

U.S. Route 281 Alternate was a 1.4-mile (2.3 km) long alternate of U.S. Route 281 running within the northeastern and eastern portions of Great Bend, Kansas. US-281 Alternate was formed in 1955 and was decommissioned about 1983. Since then it has been known as US 281 Bypass, which is mostly unsigned, two-lane surface highway bypasses downtown Great Bend. The only visible indication of this being a bypass is via street signs along intersecting streets; thus it is not a true bypass route, but a local street that is named as a bypass.

=== Route description ===
281 Bypass begins its journey near the intersection of 10th (US-56/K-96/K-156) and Pine Streets. 10th Street, which is normally east–west, travels slightly southwest-northeast for one block with its intersection with the bypass.

The bypass travels mostly to the northwest until near Park and Frey Streets. Then, it steers towards the north-northwest.

After intersecting with 22nd Street, 281 Bypass starts to curve to the west until it intersects with 24th Street. It remains unsigned on 24th Street until its northwestern terminus with its parent route on Main Street (US-281). The northwestern terminus of U.S. Highway 281 Bypass is directly adjacent to Brit Spaugh Park in Great Bend.

== See also ==
=== Related routes ===
- U.S. Route 81
- U.S. Route 181

Browse numbered routes
← US 277	OK	→ US 283
← K-279	KS	→ US-283
← US 275	NE	→ US 283
← SD 273	SD	→ SD 296
