= Twin Creek, Kansas =

- Ghost town
- Location within Kansas Location within the United States
- Coordinates: 39°17′35″N 98°40′31″W
- Country: United States
- State: Kansas
- County: Osborne
- Elevation: 1,670 ft (510 m)

Population
  - Total: 0
- Time zone: UTC-6 (CST)
  - Summer (DST): UTC-5 (CDT)
- Area code: 785
- GNIS ID: 482024

Twin Creek is a ghost town in Hancock Township, Osborne County, Kansas, United States.

== History ==
Twin Creek was issued a post office in 1872, which was discontinued in 1904. It was issued a new post office the following year, but this was itself discontinued in 1915. The population in 1910 was 95.
