= Free Will, Kansas =

- Ghost town
- Location within Kansas Location within the United States
- Coordinates: 39°14′55″N 98°30′31″W
- Country: United States
- State: Kansas
- County: Osborne
- Elevation: 1,667 ft (508 m)

Population
  - Total: 0
- Time zone: UTC-6 (CST)
  - Summer (DST): UTC-5 (CDT)
- Area code: 785
- GNIS ID: 481880

Free Will is a ghost town in Bloom Township, Osborne County, Kansas, United States.

== History ==
Free Will was issued a post office in 1872. The post office was discontinued in 1895. There is nothing left of Free Will.
