= Banks, Kansas =

- Ghost town
- Location within Kansas Location within the United States
- Coordinates: 39°19′15″N 98°58′23″W
- Country: United States
- State: Kansas
- County: Osborne
- Elevation: 1,900 ft (580 m)

Population
  - Total: 0
- Time zone: UTC-6 (CST)
  - Summer (DST): UTC-5 (CDT)
- Area code: 785
- GNIS ID: 481824

Banks is a ghost town in Osborne County, Kansas, United States.

== History ==
Banks was issued a post office in 1880. The post office was discontinued in 1888. There is nothing left of Banks.
