= Meades Ranch Triangulation Station =

- Geodetic Center of the U.S.
- U.S. National Register of Historic Places
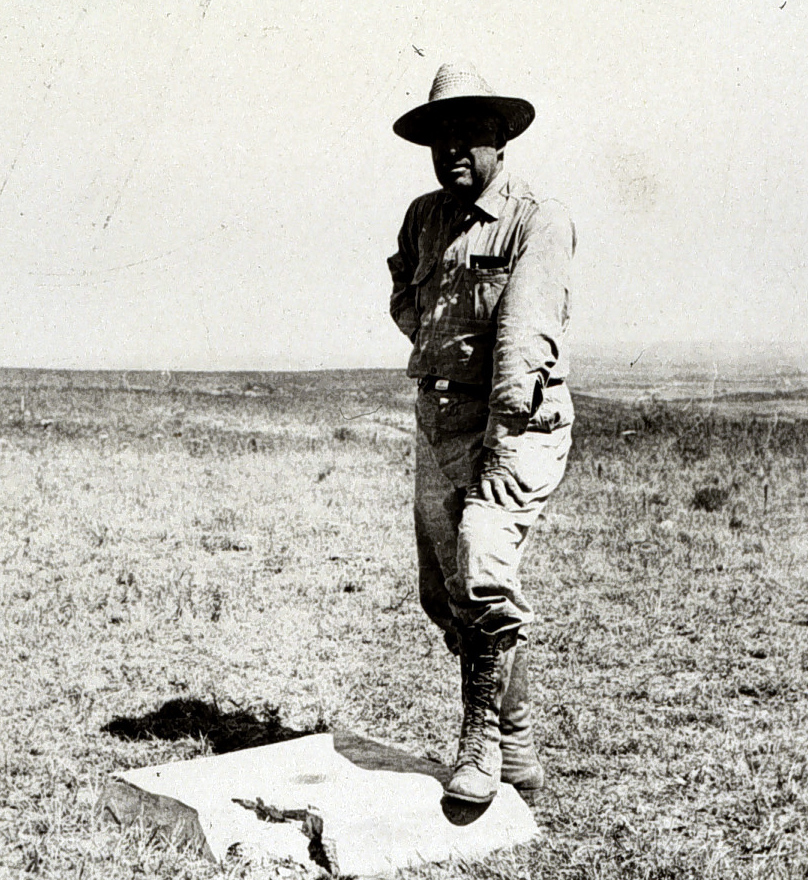
- Meades Ranch triangulation station, ca. 1940

- Location within Kansas Location within the United States
- Nearest city: Osborne, Kansas
- Coordinates: 39.224087°N 98.542152°W
- Built: 1891
- NRHP reference No.: 73000772
- Added to NRHP: October 9, 1973

The Meades Ranch Triangulation Station is a survey marker in Osborne County in the state of Kansas in the Midwestern United States. The marker was initially placed in 1891. From 1901, it was the reference location for establishing a system of horizontal measurement in the United States, known as geodetic datum. In 1913, the datum was adopted across all of North America, and the system revised and formalized as the North American Datum of 1927 (NAD27). A similar reference for vertical measurement was established in 1929 as the National Geodetic Vertical Datum of 1929. The NAD27 was later supplanted by the North American Datum of 1983 (NAD83), which was formally adopted by the United States in 1989 and Canada in 1990; the new system moved the reference point to a point in the Earth's core, and the Meades Ranch marker lost its special significance to the geodetic datum system.

In 1973, the site was listed in the National Register of Historic Places as the Geodetic Center of the United States.

== History ==
In surveying, a geodetic datum is a point or set of points used to establish a coordinate system. By designating the location of one point, and the direction from that point to a second point, one can establish a system relative to which other points can be located and mapped. As one surveys a larger area over which the curvature of the Earth becomes significant, it also becomes necessary to define an ellipsoid: a curved surface that approximates the shape of the Earth in the area of interest.

The first nationwide datum in the United States was established in 1879. At that time, a region of contiguous triangulation existed from Maine to Georgia. The New England Datum was chosen with a benchmark in Maryland, near the middle of this region, as the horizontal datum, and a second Maryland mark used to define the azimuth (horizontal) direction. To account for the Earth's curvature, the datum used a model called the Clarke spheroid, developed in 1866.

=== Meades Ranch station ===
The United States Coast and Geodetic Survey established a triangulation station, officially known as the Meades Ranch Triangulation Station, in 1891. The location lay near the intersection of two transcontinental arcs of triangulation: one running from the Atlantic to the Pacific Ocean, roughly following the 39th parallel; the other running from Mexico to Canada, along the 98th meridian.

In 1901, the Meades Ranch station was chosen as the United States standard horizontal datum: the point relative to which all land measurements in the nation were made. The choice was based on the station's location near the geographic center of the U.S. and near the intersection of the two arcs of triangulation, and because it minimized the number of changes in previously published positions. Its position was officially set as 39°13'26.686" N and 98°32'30.506" W; the azimuth direction to a triangulation station near Waldo, southwest of Meades Ranch, was officially set as 75°28'14.52" west of south.

In 1913, the chief astronomer of the Dominion of Canada Astronomical Observatory and the director of the Comisión Geodésica Mexicana announced that their organizations would use the Meades Ranch location as their standard datum. In light of this, its name was changed to the "North American Datum".

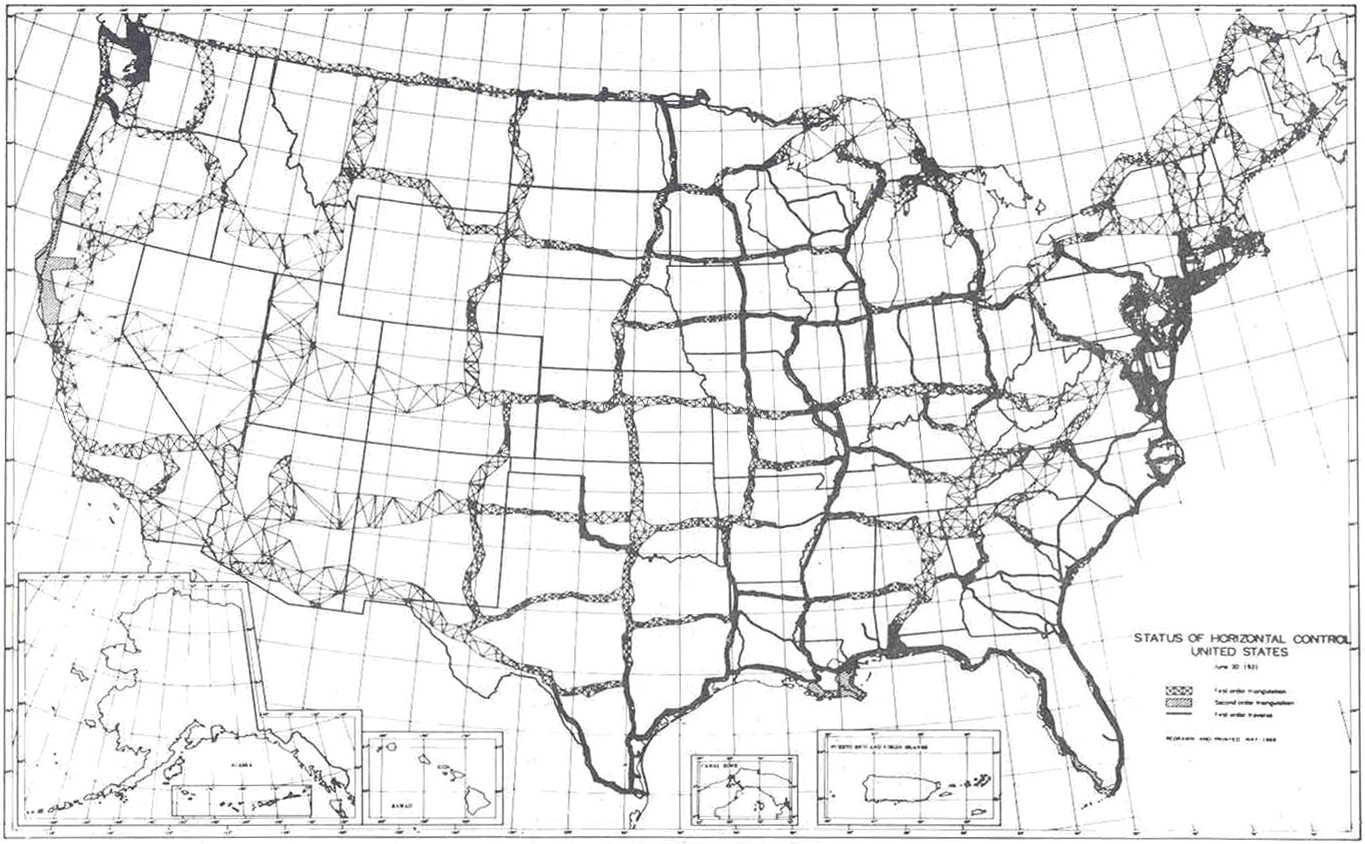
Horizontal survey control network in the United States in 1931

As more new surveys and previously isolated survey networks were incorporated into the system, it became increasingly difficult to make the necessary corrections. By the mid-1920s, it was realized that the coordinate system needed to be adjusted. From 1927 to 1932, the approximately 25,000 existing control locations were recalculated and a new coordinate system developed, known as NAD27. The new system continued to use the 1901 coordinates of Meades Ranch as its horizontal datum, and the Clarke spheroid as its model for the Earth's surface. However, it now defined horizontal directions in terms of 175 Laplace azimuths, which use astronomical azimuths corrected for the difference between the astronomic and geodetic meridians. Under NAD27, the azimuth to the Waldo station changed by about 5".

In 1973, the Meades Ranch site was added to the National Register of Historic Places, under the name "Geodetic Center of the United States".

=== NAD83 ===
Following the establishment of NAD27, it was noted that it produced a discrepancy of about 10 meters (33 ft) in latitudes in the northern part of the northern U.S. state of Michigan, necessitating a regional adjustment for the states of Michigan and Wisconsin. As the survey network was extended further north into Canada, similar discrepancies appeared. The problem proved to be systemic: It had been assumed that the differences between the Clarke spheroid and the actual geoid were negligible, whereas these differences actually introduced significant errors. The relatively small number and large separation of the points used to develop NAD27, the limited computational power available to its designers, and the movement of tectonic plates also led to inconsistencies in NAD27 coordinates.

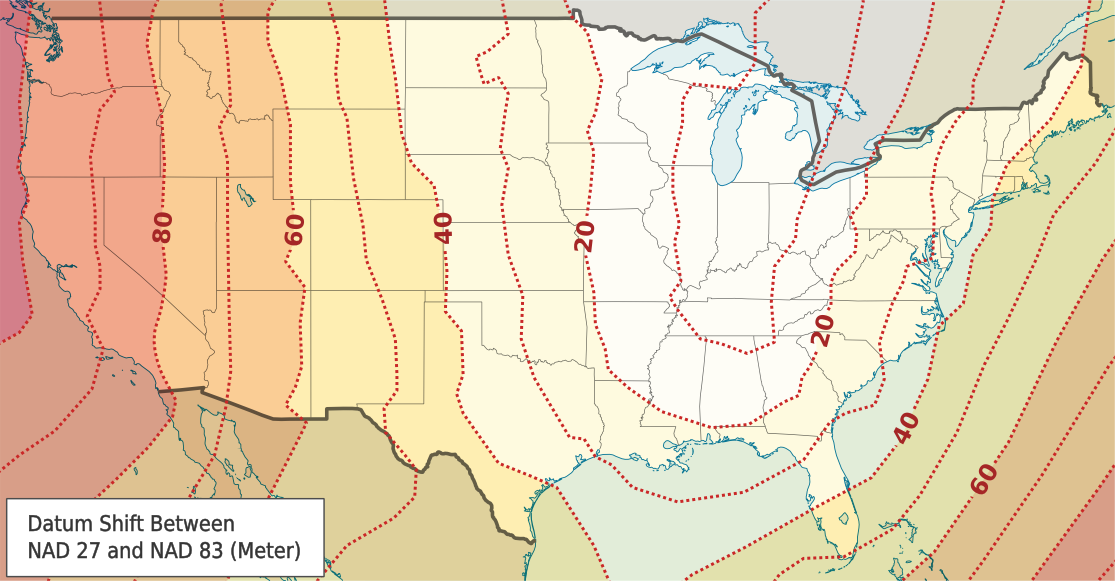

To address these, a new datum was developed, designated NAD83. It replaced the Clarke spheroid with a new ellipsoid, the Geographic Reference System 1980, centered at the Earth's center of mass as determined by the Bureau International de l'Heure. The new datum was based on adjustment of 250,000 points, including 600 satellite Doppler stations. NAD83 was officially adopted by the U.S. government in 1989, and by the Canadian government in 1990. Under the new system, Meades Ranch lost its special standing, and became one of thousands of stations.

== Description ==
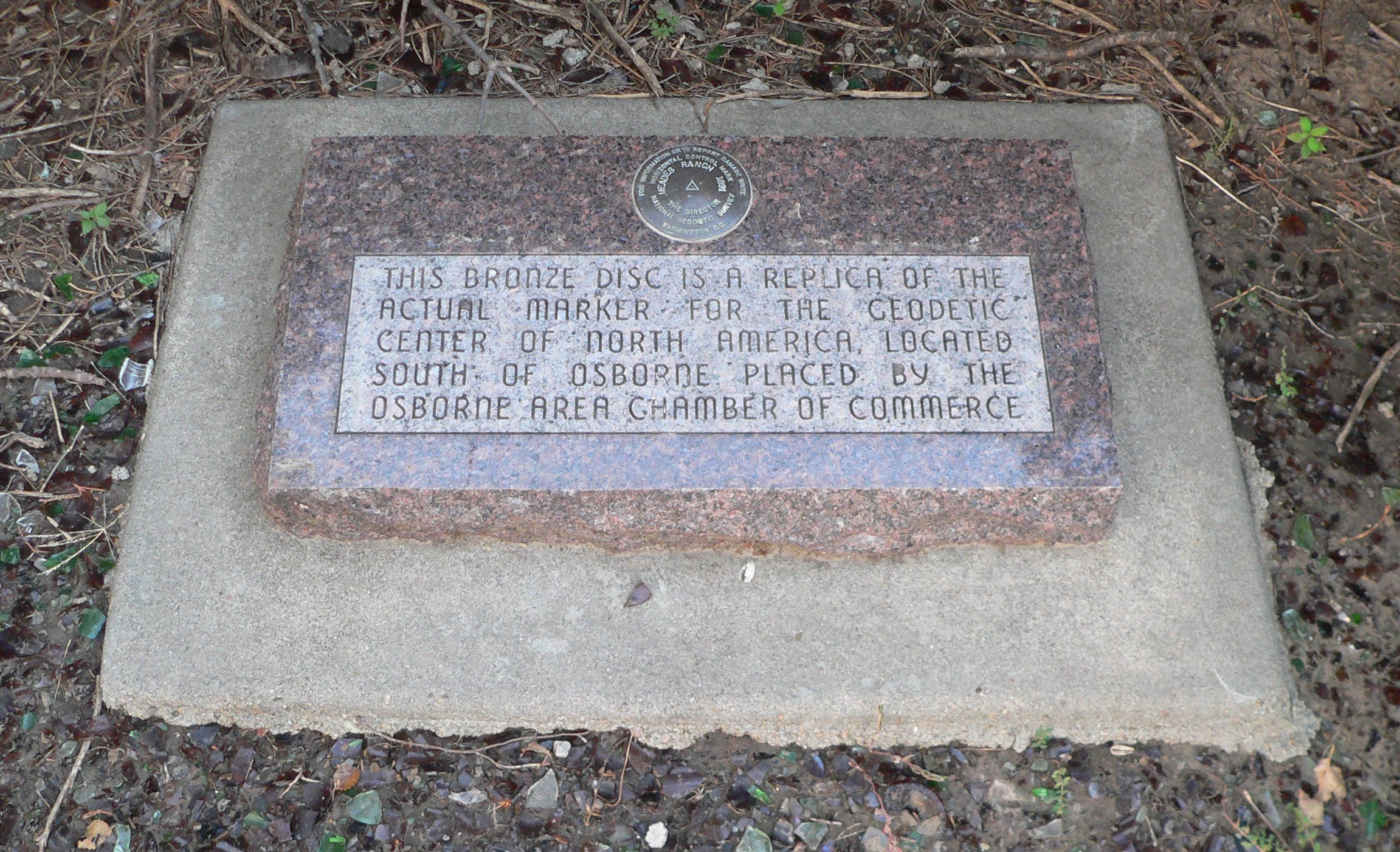
Marker at Osborne rest area, incorporating replica of Meades Ranch station marker disc

As of 2012, the location of the Meades Ranch station was 39°13′26.71220″N 98°32′31.74540″W (in NAD83(2011); WGS 84 location may be very slightly off). It lies about 12 miles (19 km) north of Lucas and about 10 miles (16 km) southwest of Tipton.

The station is on a low grassy ridge in a pasture. It is marked by a bronze disc, inscribed "Meades Ranch 1891", embedded in the top of a dome-shaped concrete marker 21 inches (53 cm) in diameter, rising about 4 inches (10 cm) above ground level. Two reference marks and an azimuth mark are located nearby.

The Meades Ranch station is on private land, with no public access. A replica of the station marker, with a Kansas historical marker explaining its significance, is located at 39.452286°N 98.693542°W, in a roadside rest area beside U.S. Highway 281 at the northern edge of Osborne, Kansas, 18 miles (29 km) northwest of the Meades Ranch site.

== See also ==
- Geodesy
