= Vincent, Kansas =

- Ghost town
- Location within Kansas Location within the United States
- Coordinates: 39°11′30″N 98°43′11″W
- Country: United States
- State: Kansas
- County: Osborne
- Elevation: 1,713 ft (522 m)

Population
  - Total: 0
- Time zone: UTC-6 (CST)
  - Summer (DST): UTC-5 (CDT)
- Area code: 785
- GNIS ID: 484600

Vincent is a ghost town in Valley Township, Osborne County, Kansas, United States.

== History ==
A post office was opened in Vincent in 1878, and remained in operation until it was discontinued in 1901.
