= Dial, Kansas =

- Ghost town
- Location within Kansas Location within the United States
- Coordinates: 39°13′55″N 98°46′31″W
- Country: United States
- State: Kansas
- County: Osborne
- Elevation: 1,886 ft (575 m)

Population
  - Total: 0
- Time zone: UTC-6 (CST)
  - Summer (DST): UTC-5 (CDT)
- Area code: 785

Dial is a ghost town in Covert Township, Osborne County, Kansas, United States.

== History ==
Dial was located in the Covert Creek Valley in Osborne County. Dial was issued a post office in 1881. The post office was discontinued in 1903. There is nothing left of Dial.
