= Portis, Kansas =

City in Osborne County, Kansas

- City
- Location within Osborne County and Kansas

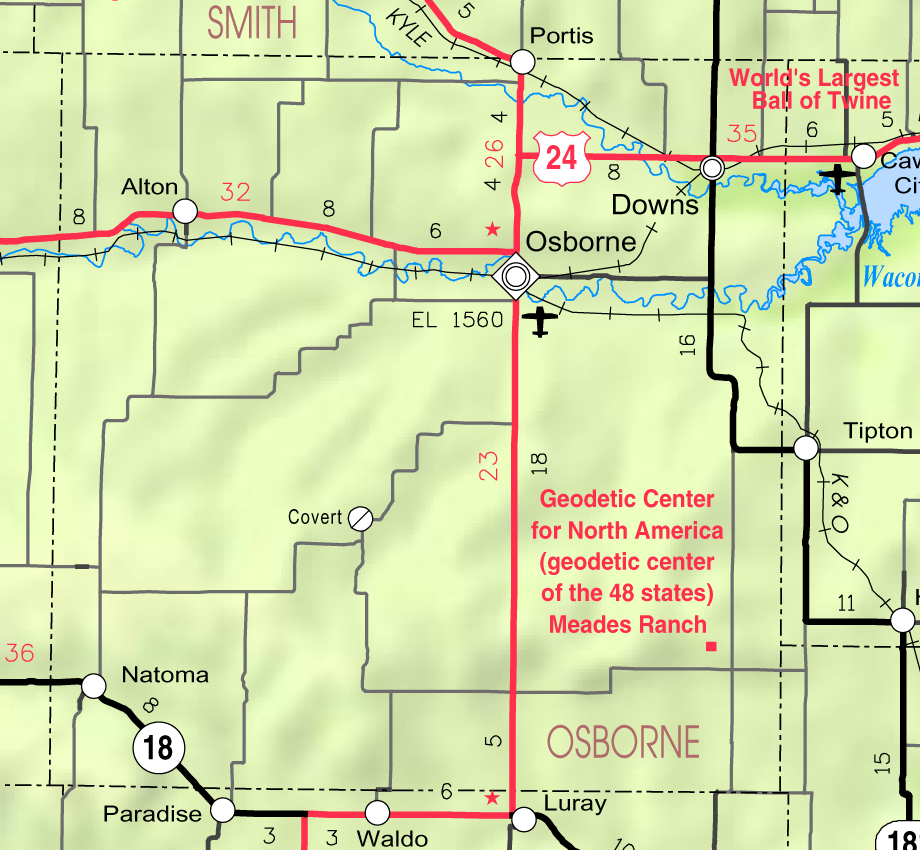
- KDOT map of Osborne County (legend)
- Coordinates: 39°33′49″N 98°41′30″W
- Country: United States
- State: Kansas
- County: Osborne
- Founded: 1870s
- Incorporated: 1904
- Named for: Jefferson Portis

Area
  - Total: 0.26 sq mi (0.68 km^{2})
  - Land: 0.26 sq mi (0.68 km^{2})
  - Water: 0 sq mi (0.00 km^{2})
- Elevation: 1,542 ft (470 m)

Population (2020)
  - Total: 86
  - Density: 330/sq mi (130/km^{2})
- Time zone: UTC-6 (CST)
  - Summer (DST): UTC-5 (CDT)
- ZIP Code: 67474
- Area code: 785
- FIPS code: 20-57100
- GNIS ID: 2396258

Portis is a city in Osborne County, Kansas, United States. As of the 2020 census, the population of the city was 86.

== History ==
The first settlement at Portis was made in 1871. In that year a trading post was established at the site.

In 1879, the town was platted with the name of Bethany. The Central Branch Railroad routed through the city and built a station. Later, the railroad was sold to the Missouri Pacific Railroad, becoming the second "Bethany" on their railroad system. To prevent conflicts with Bethany, Missouri, it was decided to change the name of this station. The name was changed to Portis, in honor of the Vice-President of the Missouri Pacific, Thomas Jefferson Portis (born in 1827).

== Geography ==
According to the United States Census Bureau, the city has a total area of 0.25 square miles (0.65 km^{2}), all land.

Portis is located on the north fork of the Solomon River.

== Demographics ==
Historical population
Census	Pop.	Note	%±
1880	43		—
1910	304		—
1920	390		28.3%
1930	340		−12.8%
1940	349		2.6%
1950	286		−18.1%
1960	232		−18.9%
1970	178		−23.3%
1980	172		−3.4%
1990	129		−25.0%
2000	123		−4.7%
2010	103		−16.3%
2020	86		−16.5%
U.S. Decennial Census

=== 2020 census ===
The 2020 United States census counted 86 people, 41 households, and 25 families in Portis. The population density was 329.5 per square mile (127.2/km^{2}). There were 60 housing units at an average density of 229.9 per square mile (88.8/km^{2}). The racial makeup was 95.35% (82) white or European American (94.19% non-Hispanic white), 0.0% (0) black or African-American, 0.0% (0) Native American or Alaska Native, 1.16% (1) Asian, 0.0% (0) Pacific Islander or Native Hawaiian, 0.0% (0) from other races, and 3.49% (3) from two or more races. Hispanic or Latino of any race was 1.16% (1) of the population.

Of the 41 households, 29.3% had children under the age of 18; 48.8% were married couples living together; 17.1% had a female householder with no spouse or partner present. 39.0% of households consisted of individuals and 7.3% had someone living alone who was 65 years of age or older. The average household size was 3.2 and the average family size was 3.4. The percent of those with a bachelor's degree or higher was estimated to be 14.0% of the population.

19.8% of the population was under the age of 18, 1.2% from 18 to 24, 24.4% from 25 to 44, 32.6% from 45 to 64, and 22.1% who were 65 years of age or older. The median age was 49.0 years. For every 100 females, there were 100.0 males. For every 100 females ages 18 and older, there were 97.1 males.

The 2016–2020 5-year American Community Survey estimates show that the median household income was $54,519 (with a margin of error of +/- $6,775) and the median family income was $54,904 (+/- $6,956). Males had a median income of $28,958 (+/- $19,831) versus $20,781 (+/- $3,028) for females. The median income for those above 16 years old was $26,875 (+/- $4,081). Approximately, 7.3% of families and 12.7% of the population were below the poverty line, including 18.9% of those under the age of 18 and 10.5% of those ages 65 or over.

=== 2010 census ===
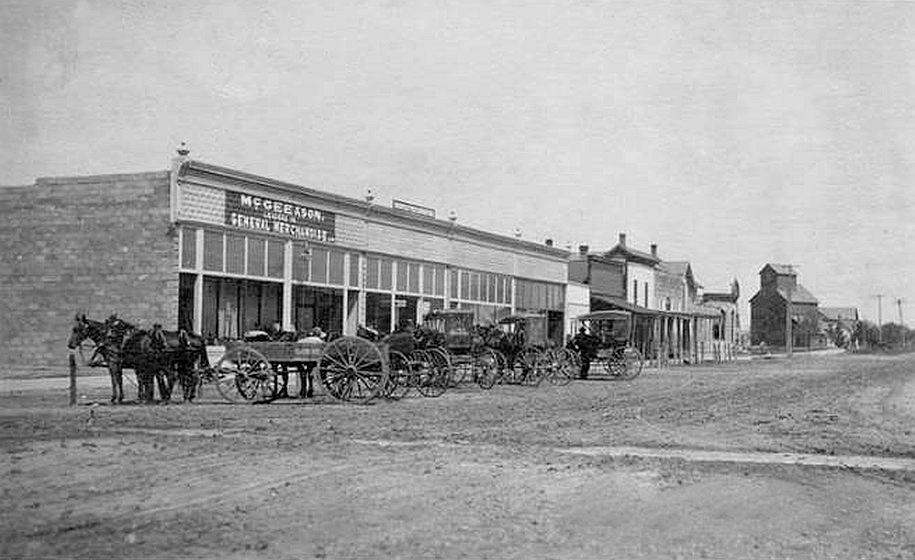
Portis, 1911

As of the census of 2010, there were 103 people, 50 households, and 29 families residing in the city. The population density was 412.0 inhabitants per square mile (159.1/km^{2}). There were 78 housing units at an average density of 312.0 per square mile (120.5/km^{2}). The racial makeup of the city was 99.0% White and 1.0% from two or more races.

There were 50 households, of which 22.0% had children under the age of 18 living with them, 50.0% were married couples living together, 6.0% had a female householder with no husband present, 2.0% had a male householder with no wife present, and 42.0% were non-families. 40.0% of all households were made up of individuals, and 22% had someone living alone who was 65 years of age or older. The average household size was 2.06 and the average family size was 2.76.

The median age in the city was 46.5 years. 22.3% of residents were under the age of 18; 7.8% were between the ages of 18 and 24; 17.5% were from 25 to 44; 30% were from 45 to 64; and 22.3% were 65 years of age or older. The gender makeup of the city was 51.5% male and 48.5% female.

== Education ==
Portis is served by Osborne County USD 392 public school district.

Portis High School was closed in 1967 through school unification. The Portis High School mascot was Portis Tigers.
