= Delhi, Kansas =

- Ghost town
- Location within Kansas Location within the United States
- Coordinates: 39°09′40″N 98°31′21″W
- Country: United States
- State: Kansas
- County: Osborne
- Elevation: 1,647 ft (502 m)

Population
  - Total: 0
- Time zone: UTC-6 (CST)
  - Summer (DST): UTC-5 (CDT)
- Area code: 785

Delhi is a ghost town in Delhi Township, Osborne County, Kansas, United States.

== History ==
Delhi was issued a post office in 1875. The post office was discontinued in 1894.

The Delhi cemetery is nearby.
