= Downs station =

- Downs Missouri Pacific Depot
- U.S. National Register of Historic Places
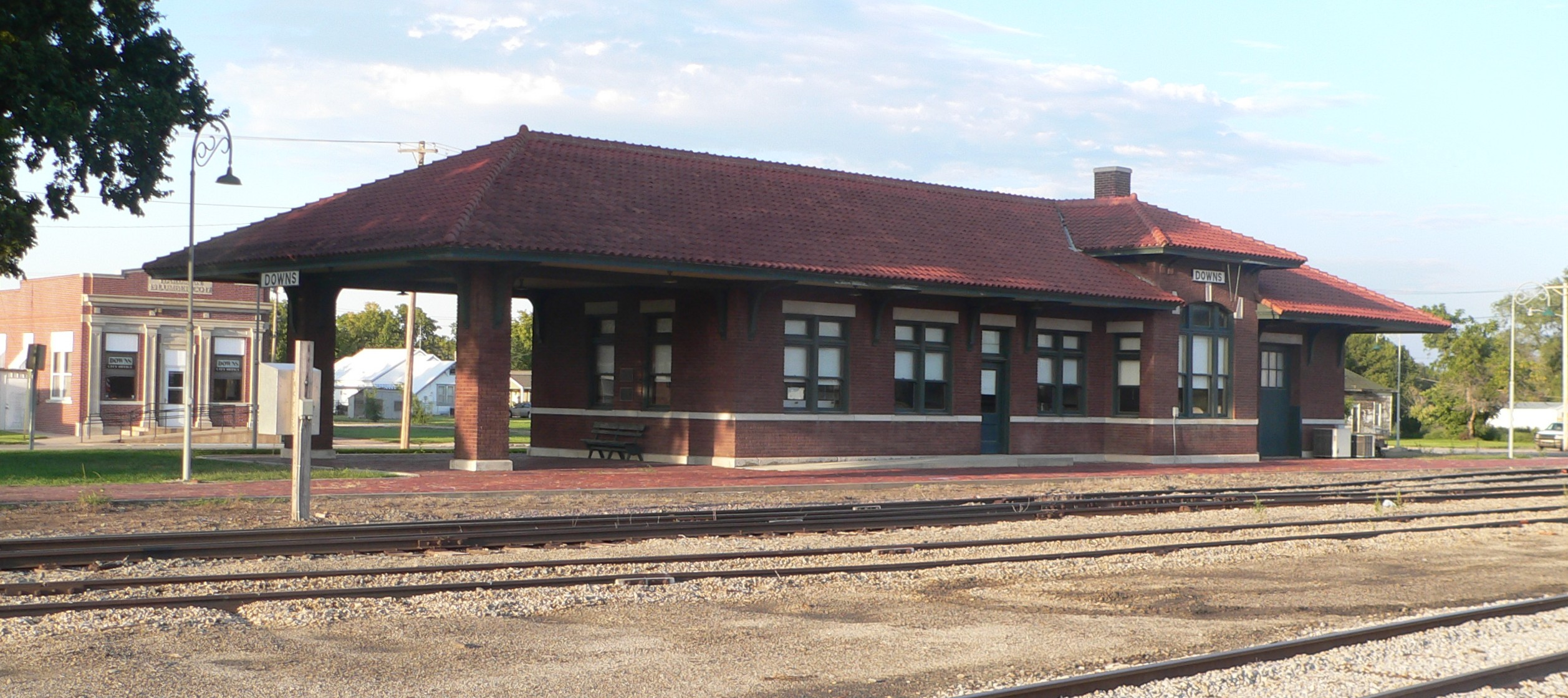

- Location within Kansas Location within the United States
- Location: 710 Railroad Street; Downs, Kansas
- Coordinates: 39°30′09″N 98°32′36″W
- Built: 1917
- Architect: Missouri Pacific Railroad
- Architectural style: Italian Renaissance architecture
- NRHP reference No.: 01001093
- Added to NRHP: October 11, 2001

The Downs station, nominated as the Downs Missouri Pacific Depot, is a historic railroad depot building at 710 Railroad Street in Downs, Kansas. The Missouri Pacific Railroad depot was located at a junction with lines radiating to Atchison, Lenora, and Stockton. The Central Branch of the Union Pacific Railroad completed the line from Atchison to Downs in 1879. However, this branch line better served the needs of the Missouri Pacific, which purchased the line in 1895. By the early 1900s, there were 18 trains a day serving Downs, which had a significant railroad presence with a ten stall roundhouse and associated railroad facilities. In 1916, the wooden depot burned down, necessitating the construction of the present brick depot.

Passenger service to the depot lasted until at least 1959 with the station added to the National Register of Historic Places on October 11, 2001.

Preceding station	Atchison, Topeka and Santa Fe Railway	Following station
Nowhere toward Ottawa	Ottawa – Lawrence	Vinland toward Lawrence
Preceding station	Missouri Pacific Railroad	Following station
Osborne toward Stockton	St. Joseph-Stockton	Cawker City toward St. Joseph
