= Bloomington, Kansas =

Unincorporated community in Osborne County, Kansas

- Unincorporated community
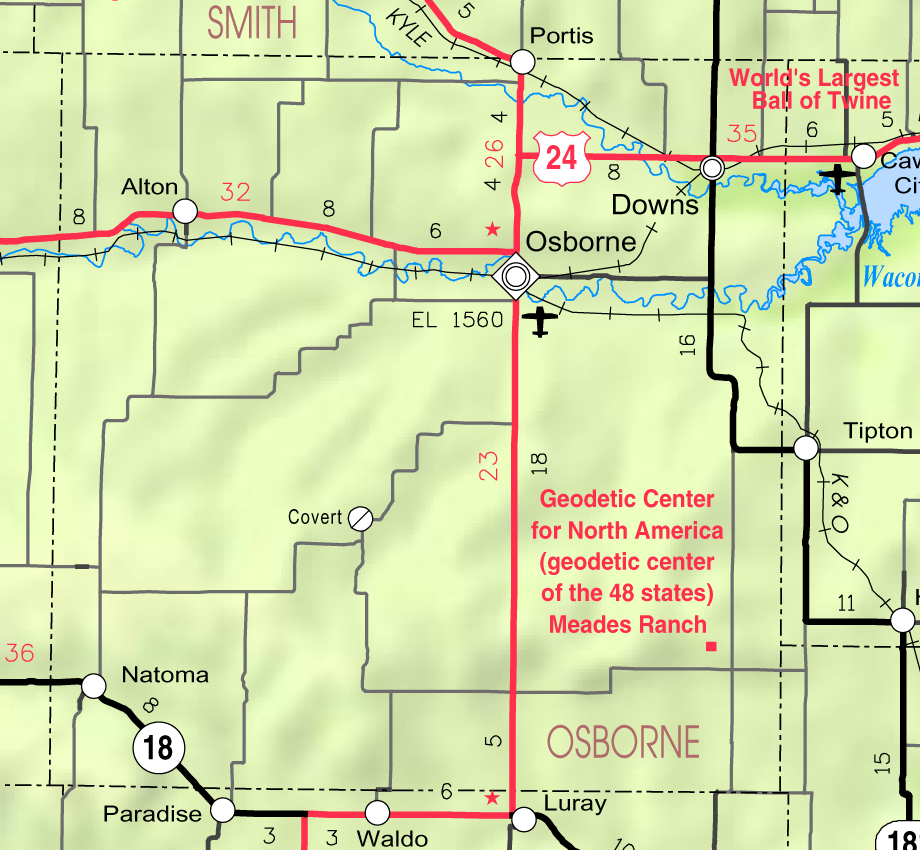
- KDOT map of Osborne County (legend)

- Location within Kansas Location within the United States
- Coordinates: 39°27′6″N 98°47′13″W
- Country: United States
- State: Kansas
- County: Osborne
- Founded: 1870s
- Platted: 1871
- Elevation: 1,591 ft (485 m)
- Time zone: UTC-6 (CST)
  - Summer (DST): UTC-5 (CDT)
- Area code: 785
- FIPS code: 29-07525
- GNIS ID: 472270

Bloomington is an unincorporated community in Osborne County, Kansas, United States. It is located about 4 miles west of Osborne.

== History ==
Bloomington was originally called Tilden, and under the latter name was platted in 1871. The present name of Bloomington was adopted in 1873. A post office was opened in Bloomington in the 1870s, and remained in operation until it was discontinued in 1955.

== Education ==
Bloomington grade school was closed in 1968.
