= Roundmound, Kansas =

- Ghost town
- Location within Kansas Location within the United States
- Coordinates: 39°16′40″N 98°58′31″W
- Country: United States
- State: Kansas
- County: Osborne
- Elevation: 2,001 ft (610 m)

Population
  - Total: 0
- Time zone: UTC-6 (CST)
  - Summer (DST): UTC-5 (CDT)
- Area code: 785
- GNIS ID: 481987

Roundmound is a ghost town in Round Mound Township, Osborne County, Kansas, United States.

== History ==
Round Mound was issued a post office in 1879. The post office was renamed Roundmound in 1894. The post office was discontinued in 1904. There is nothing left of Roundmound, but there is a cemetery of it nearby.
