= Round Mound of Sound =

Round Mound of Sound may refer to a nickname for:

- Al Hirt (1922–1999), American trumpeter and bandleader.
- Kenny Price (1931–1987), American singer, songwriter, and actor
- Joe Pedicino (born 1949), American professional wrestling announcer
- Kris Johnson (basketball) (born 1975), American basketball player
