= Corinth, Kansas =

Unincorporated community in Osborne County, Kansas

- Unincorporated community
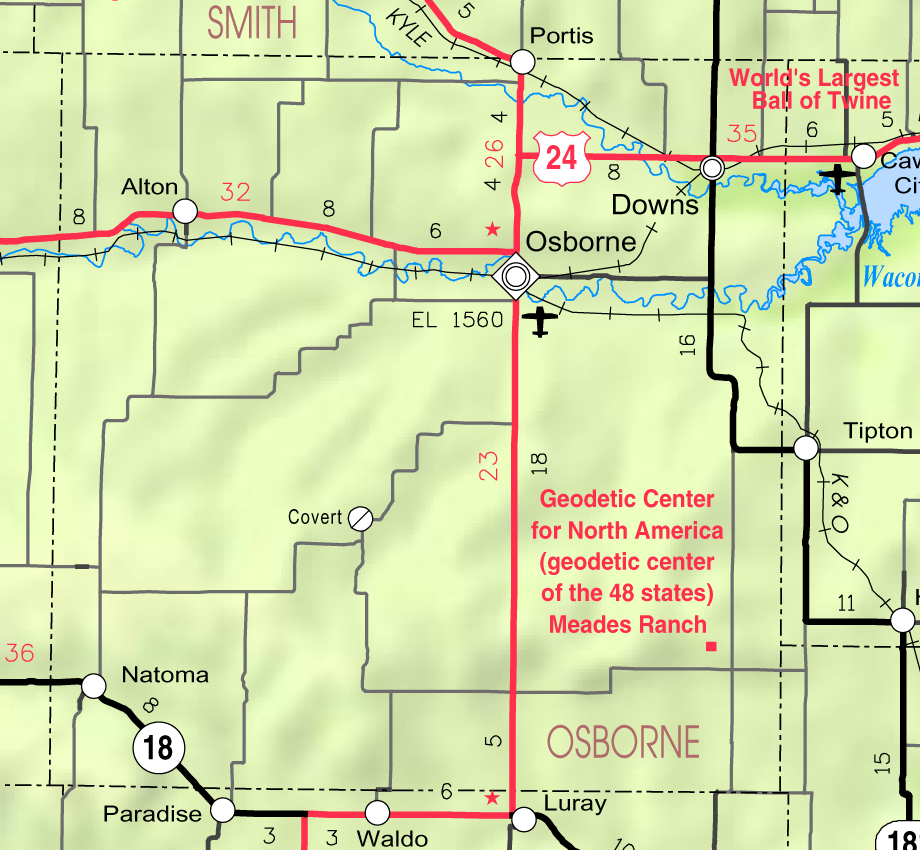
- KDOT map of Osborne County (legend)

- Location within Kansas Location within the United States
- Coordinates: 39°24′58″N 98°32′43″W
- Country: United States
- State: Kansas
- County: Osborne
- Founded: 1870s
- Elevation: 1,499 ft (457 m)
- Time zone: UTC-6 (CST)
  - Summer (DST): UTC-5 (CDT)
- Area code: 785
- FIPS code: 20-15600
- GNIS ID: 484594

Corinth is an unincorporated community in Osborne County, Kansas, United States. It is located approximately 5.5 miles south of Downs.

== History ==
A post office was opened in the NE 1/4 of Section 22 in Corinth Township, Osborne County, Kansas, in 1872, with Potter Kenyon as postmaster, and remained in operation until it was discontinued in 1896. In 1915 the Salina Northern Railroad was built through Corinth Township, and a grain elevator and warehouse were built along the railroad line in the eastern half of Section 28, 1.5 miles southwest of where the post office used to be twenty years ago.
