= Osborne County, Kansas =

County in Kansas, United States

- County
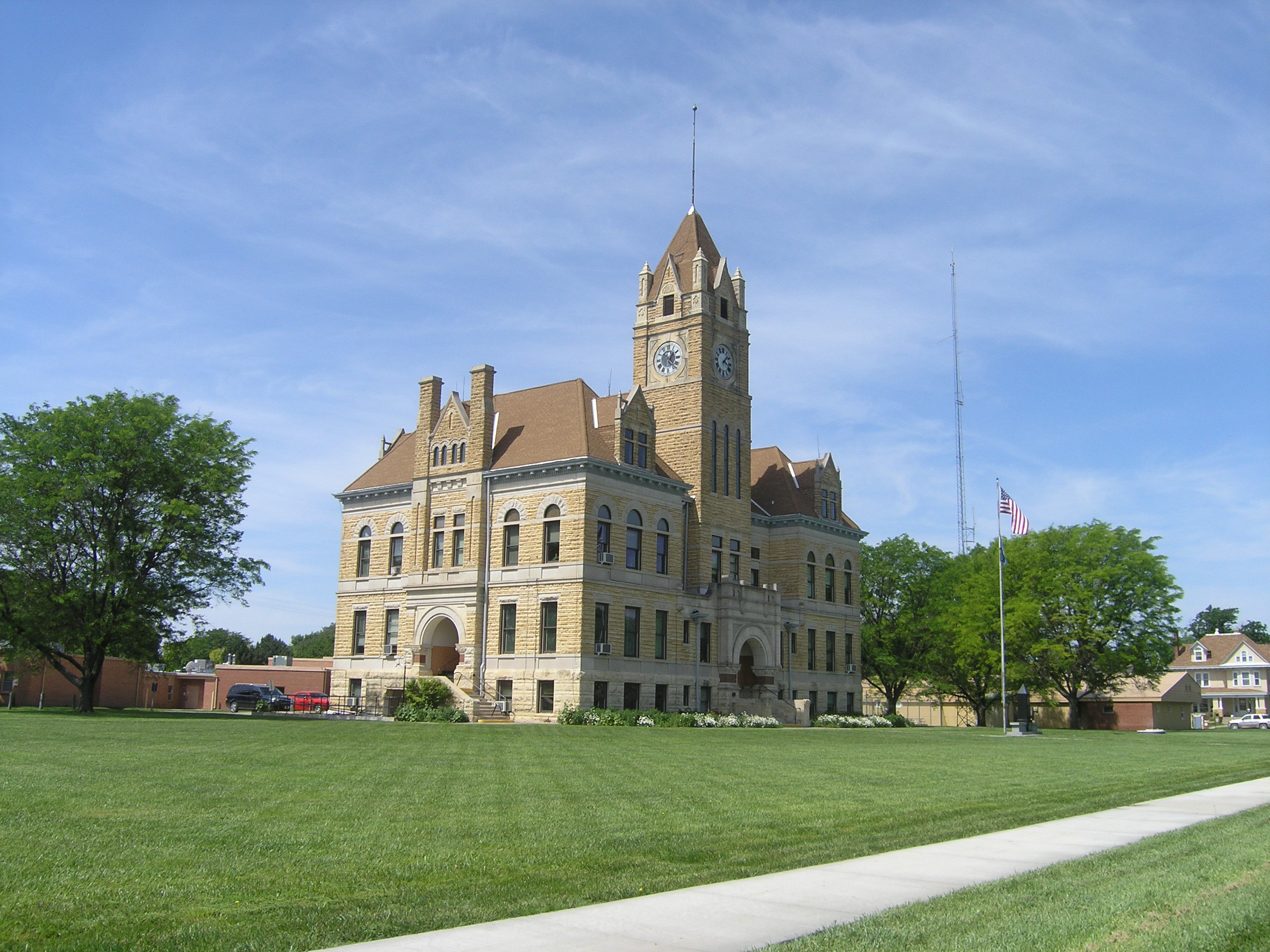
- Osborne County Courthouse in Osborne (2012)

- Location within the U.S. state of Kansas
- Coordinates: 39°31′57″N 98°39′54″W
- Country: United States
- State: Kansas
- Founded: February 26, 1867
- Named for: Vincent B. Osborne
- Seat: Osborne
- Largest city: Osborne

Area
  - Total: 894 sq mi (2,320 km^{2})
  - Land: 893 sq mi (2,310 km^{2})
  - Water: 1.9 sq mi (4.9 km^{2}) 0.2%

Population (2020)
  - Total: 3,500
  - Estimate (2025): 3,285 ▼
  - Density: 3.9/sq mi (1.5/km^{2})
- Time zone: UTC−6 (Central)
  - Summer (DST): UTC−5 (CDT)
- Congressional district: 1st
- Website: OsborneCounty.org

Osborne County is a county located in the U.S. state of Kansas. Its county seat and largest city is Osborne. As of the 2020 census, the county population was 3,500. The county is named for Vincent Osborne, a captain in the American Civil War.

== History ==
=== Early history ===
For many millennia, the Great Plains of North America was inhabited by nomadic Native Americans. From the 16th century to 18th century, the Kingdom of France claimed ownership of large parts of North America. In 1762, after the French and Indian War, France secretly ceded New France to Spain, per the Treaty of Fontainebleau.

=== 19th century ===
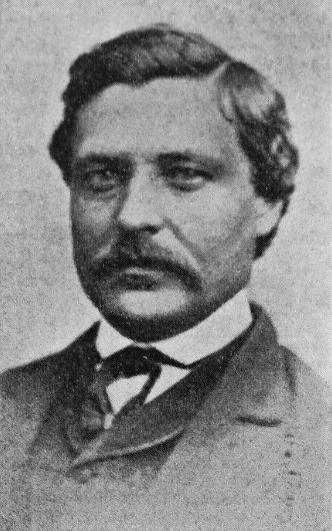
Vincent B. Osborne

In 1802, Spain returned most of the land to France, but keeping title to about 7,500 square miles. In 1803, most of the land for modern day Kansas was acquired by the United States from France as part of the 828,000 square mile Louisiana Purchase for 2.83 cents per acre.

In 1854, the Kansas Territory was organized, then in 1861 Kansas became the 34th U.S. state. In 1867, Osborne County was established.

During the Civil War the Kansas legislature ordered the survey of western two-thirds of the new state in anticipation of future settlement. An escort of soldiers from Fort Riley accompanied U.S. Deputy Surveyors D. E. Ballard and E. C. Manning as they commenced the survey of what is now Osborne County on September 8, 1862. Early the next year, however, they had to suspend their surveying efforts due to the proximity of, and objections from, the natives of the area - the Indians.

At this time the Solomon River valley was rich with beaver, antelope, elk, and buffalo. Several Indian tribes had hunted in the valley for decades and were in no mood to share the land with settlers bent on decimating the abundant game, plowing under the lush grass for farming, and just generally changing the way things were.

Some 200 Cheyenne were encamped in the county when Ballard and Manning were ordered to resume the survey in 1866. While escorting the surveying party along Twin Creek on July 21, soldier Edward Roche of Company I, 2nd U.S. Cavalry, was killed by Indians. They buried him at what later became the common corner of Corinth, Penn, Winfield and Bloom Townships. On May 15, 1868, the survey of Osborne County was at last completed. The boundaries of the county were defined by the legislature on March 3, 1867. The governor named it in honor of Captain Vincent B. Osborne, a Civil War soldier who lost a leg in a battle on January 17, 1865, at Joy's Ford on the Arkansas River. Later Osborne was elected State Representative of Ellsworth County in 1871 and served as Ellsworth County Probate Judge for a number of years prior to his death at age 40 of erysipelas on December 21, 1879. Oddly, Osborne never set foot in the county named after him.

On January 14, 1870, George Wolberd filed the county's first homestead claim in the extreme northeast corner of Osborne County. John M. Boer filed a homestead claim next to Wolberd later the same day. Both men were members of the Rotterdam Dutch Colony that settled in 1869 and 1870 along Oak Creek in what are now Mitchell, Osborne, Jewell, and Smith Counties.

Zarah Hill came to the North Fork Solomon River valley on March 1, 1870, and filed a claim on March 25 for land in the northeast corner of what later became Bethany Township. He was the third man to homestead in the county.

That same month brothers Charles and William Bullock made the first permanent non-native settlement in the county on the north side of the South Solomon River in what is now Tilden Township. They constructed a double cabin with port holes surrounded with a log enclosure for their horses and the "Bullock Ranche" became the terminus for all early homestead and hunting parties in northwest Kansas over the next two years.

After its creation in 1867 Osborne County was attached to Mitchell County for legal purposes, as the county had not formally organized. The first couple married in the county, Solomon Weatherman and Marinda Alling, had to travel to Beloit to obtain a marriage license before returning to their homestead two miles south of modern-day Bloomington. They were married there on March 1, 1871.

The second town in Osborne County, Arlington, was founded when Calvin Reasoner opened a log general store two miles east of present-day Bloomington in late 1870. On May 27, 1871, a meeting was held on the steps of Calvin Reasoner and Frank Thompson's general store in Arlington to discuss preliminary steps towards organization of the county. To no one's surprise, Reasoner was elected chairman of the meeting and Thompson secretary. A census committee of Charles Cunningham, William Bullock and A. B. Fleming was appointed to ascertain whether the county held the 700 residents required for securing state recognition of legal organization, and it was decided to reconvene one week later on Saturday, June 3, 1871, at Arlington with the results.

The Pennsylvania Colony had founded the town of Osborne City on May 1, 1871, with the intention of making it the county seat - a hope that Calvin Reasoner desired for his own town of Arlington. He therefore kept secret the May 27 meeting from the Colony and did his best to do the same with the second meeting. He failed.

"He [Reasoner] sent runners north, south, and west, notifying them to be at Arlington at seven p.m. that day for the purpose of locating a county seat. One of their men came to our Colony at four p.m. and told. Our men started at once, north, east, and south, telling every one to meet here at six p.m., that the county seat was to be located. Some forty men responded. They were told what Calvin Reasoner had done and all of them got to Arlington before seven p.m. Of course the Arlington bunch was surprised." - Frank A. Rothenberger, Pennsylvania Colony member.

The meeting was called to order with Calvin Reasoner as chairman. The Pennsylvania Colony held the majority of the persons attending. The census committee reported 724 inhabitants and 281 voters in the county, a sufficient number under law to further proceed with organization.

"After assembling we found that we were a majority; however, we kept quiet until the time came to choose a temporary county seat, when one of our number arose and moved that Osborne City be declared the temporary county seat, which received an immediate second by another of our party. Then the fun commenced; a general hubbub ensued. After a while a gentleman arose and asked, ‘Where is Osborne City? We have never heard of the town!’ Our president then arose and deliberately drew from his pocket the charter of Osborne City, containing the great seal of the secretary of the state of Kansas, which he exhibited to the audience. He then demanded of each of the champions for other towns that they show theirs, but they were obliged to confess that they had none. An effort was then made to postpone the vote until another meeting." - Francis Gruger, Pennsylvania Colony member.

"Cal had sent a man to Russell to call for a requisition from the governor. A vote was taken and our crowd won by four. The chairman stated it wouldn’t do them [the colonists] any good, as they had to have the proper papers signed by the governor. Major Henry D. Markley said they had attended to that on coming into the state, and produced the papers and said it had to be settled right now, and it was." - Frank A. Rothenberger.

Apart from the county seat question, Calvin Reasoner's chief objective for the June 3 meeting, legal organization of the county, was accomplished. Charles Cunningham, Samuel Chatfield, and Frank Stafford were elected special county commissioners. Frank Thompson was named county clerk and Osborne City became the temporary county seat. Cunningham, A. B. Fleming, and Charles Bullock were appointed to draft a petition to the governor praying for recognition of Osborne County's legal organization.

The census presented at the meeting included all parties having claims in the county and showed that at the time half of the adult males in the county were bachelors. Unfortunately the first names of all women and children residing in the county were not listed in the census, and so the state authorities found the census defective. They stopped action on recognition of the county's organization until a second census was completed. This was done and on September 12, 1871, Kansas Governor James Harvey issued a proclamation declaring the county organized and a legal entity. Elections for the various county offices were held that November and Osborne County was officially organized.

Biographies of prominent men and women from throughout Osborne County's history, including Jones, can be found at the Osborne County Kansas Hall of Fame website.

== Geography ==
According to the U.S. Census Bureau, the county has a total area of 894 square miles (2,320 km^{2}), of which 893 square miles (2,310 km^{2}) is land and 1.9 square miles (4.9 km^{2}) (0.2%) is water. The county is intersected by the south fork of Solomon River. The surface is rolling and consists mostly of prairies.

The geodetic center of North America is located within the county. The geographic center of the 48 contiguous states is located in neighboring Smith County.

=== Adjacent counties ===
- Smith County (north)
- Jewell County (northeast)
- Mitchell County (east)
- Lincoln County (southeast)
- Russell County (south)
- Ellis County (southwest)
- Rooks County (west)

== Demographics ==
Historical population
Census	Pop.	Note	%±
1870	33		—
1880	12,517		37,830.3%
1890	12,083		−3.5%
1900	11,844		−2.0%
1910	12,827		8.3%
1920	12,441		−3.0%
1930	11,568		−7.0%
1940	9,835		−15.0%
1950	8,558		−13.0%
1960	7,506		−12.3%
1970	6,416		−14.5%
1980	5,959		−7.1%
1990	4,867		−18.3%
2000	4,452		−8.5%
2010	3,858		−13.3%
2020	3,500		−9.3%
2025 (est.)	3,285	▼	−6.1%
U.S. Decennial Census; 1790-1960 1900-1990; 1990-2000 2010-2020

=== Racial and ethnic composition ===
Osborne County, Kansas – Racial and ethnic composition Note: the US Census treats Hispanic/Latino as an ethnic category. This table excludes Latinos from the racial categories and assigns them to a separate category. Hispanics/Latinos may be of any race.
Race / Ethnicity (NH = Non-Hispanic)	Pop 1980	Pop 1990	Pop 2000	Pop 2010	Pop 2020	% 1980	% 1990	% 2000	% 2010	% 2020
White alone (NH)	5,899	4,822	4,378	3,743	3,285	98.99%	99.08%	98.34%	97.02%	93.86%
Black or African American alone (NH)	8	4	3	8	1	0.13%	0.08%	0.07%	0.21%	0.03%
Native American or Alaska Native alone (NH)	12	18	9	12	19	0.20%	0.37%	0.20%	0.31%	0.54%
Asian alone (NH)	5	6	9	17	18	0.08%	0.12%	0.20%	0.44%	0.51%
Native Hawaiian or Pacific Islander alone (NH)	x	x	1	0	0	x	x	0.02%	0.00%	0.00%
Other race alone (NH)	6	0	1	0	3	0.10%	0.00%	0.02%	0.00%	0.09%
Mixed race or Multiracial (NH)	x	x	34	32	108	x	x	0.76%	0.83%	3.09%
Hispanic or Latino (any race)	29	17	17	46	66	0.49%	0.35%	0.38%	1.19%	1.89%
Total	5,959	4,867	4,452	3,858	3,500	100.00%	100.00%	100.00%	100.00%	100.00%

=== 2020 census ===
As of the 2020 census, the county had a population of 3,500. The median age was 49.3 years. 21.3% of residents were under the age of 18 and 26.5% of residents were 65 years of age or older. For every 100 females there were 97.3 males, and for every 100 females age 18 and over there were 98.5 males age 18 and over.

The racial makeup of the county was 94.4% White, 0.0% Black or African American, 0.5% American Indian and Alaska Native, 0.5% Asian, 0.0% Native Hawaiian and Pacific Islander, 0.8% from some other race, and 3.7% from two or more races. Hispanic or Latino residents of any race comprised 1.9% of the population.

0.0% of residents lived in urban areas, while 100.0% lived in rural areas.

There were 1,563 households in the county, of which 24.4% had children under the age of 18 living with them and 23.8% had a female householder with no spouse or partner present. About 34.3% of all households were made up of individuals and 17.2% had someone living alone who was 65 years of age or older.

There were 2,044 housing units, of which 23.5% were vacant. Among occupied housing units, 76.9% were owner-occupied and 23.1% were renter-occupied. The homeowner vacancy rate was 3.6% and the rental vacancy rate was 15.6%.

=== 2000 census ===
As of the census of 2000, there were 4,452 people, 1,940 households, and 1,208 families residing in the county. The population density was 5 people per square mile (1.9 people/km^{2}). There were 2,419 housing units at an average density of 3 per square mile (1.2/km^{2}). The racial makeup of the county was 98.61% White, 0.07% Black or African American, 0.22% Native American, 0.20% Asian, 0.02% Pacific Islander, 0.07% from other races, and 0.81% from two or more races. 0.38% of the population were Hispanic or Latino of any race.

There were 1,940 households, out of which 25.90% had children under the age of 18 living with them, 54.50% were married couples living together, 5.20% had a female householder with no husband present, and 37.70% were non-families. 35.20% of all households were made up of individuals, and 18.30% had someone living alone who was 65 years of age or older. The average household size was 2.23 and the average family size was 2.90.

In the county, the population was spread out, with 23.80% under the age of 18, 5.50% from 18 to 24, 22.30% from 25 to 44, 22.60% from 45 to 64, and 25.70% who were 65 years of age or older. The median age was 44 years. For every 100 females there were 96.80 males. For every 100 females age 18 and over, there were 92.60 males.

The median income for a household in the county was $29,145, and the median income for a family was $35,438. Males had a median income of $24,736 versus $16,516 for females. The per capita income for the county was $16,236. About 7.20% of families and 10.40% of the population were below the poverty line, including 12.20% of those under age 18 and 8.50% of those age 65 or over.

== Government ==
=== Presidential elections ===
Presidential election results

United States presidential election results for Osborne County, Kansas
Year	Republican		Democratic		Third party(ies)	
Year	No.	%	No.	%	No.	%
1888	1,680	64.62%	686	26.38%	234	9.00%
1892	1,162	45.37%	0	0.00%	1,399	54.63%
1896	1,325	47.85%	1,403	50.67%	41	1.48%
1900	1,555	54.43%	1,239	43.37%	63	2.21%
1904	1,765	71.05%	420	16.91%	299	12.04%
1908	1,665	55.30%	1,132	37.60%	214	7.11%
1912	733	26.78%	972	35.51%	1,032	37.71%
1916	2,149	42.29%	2,621	51.58%	311	6.12%
1920	3,060	74.45%	980	23.84%	70	1.70%
1924	3,333	71.55%	905	19.43%	420	9.02%
1928	3,683	81.34%	821	18.13%	24	0.53%
1932	2,555	51.94%	2,231	45.35%	133	2.70%
1936	2,765	55.54%	2,200	44.19%	13	0.26%
1940	3,424	68.55%	1,488	29.79%	83	1.66%
1944	2,827	71.52%	1,078	27.27%	48	1.21%
1948	2,603	62.87%	1,420	34.30%	117	2.83%
1952	3,577	81.24%	754	17.12%	72	1.64%
1956	2,948	73.72%	1,023	25.58%	28	0.70%
1960	2,731	69.97%	1,152	29.52%	20	0.51%
1964	1,700	49.99%	1,659	48.78%	42	1.23%
1968	2,073	65.39%	793	25.02%	304	9.59%
1972	2,182	73.42%	724	24.36%	66	2.22%
1976	1,574	55.42%	1,190	41.90%	76	2.68%
1980	2,188	73.32%	620	20.78%	176	5.90%
1984	2,171	74.63%	686	23.58%	52	1.79%
1988	1,541	60.57%	943	37.07%	60	2.36%
1992	1,003	38.47%	779	29.88%	825	31.65%
1996	1,582	66.14%	608	25.42%	202	8.44%
2000	1,432	70.54%	484	23.84%	114	5.62%
2004	1,587	76.48%	454	21.88%	34	1.64%
2008	1,490	77.20%	403	20.88%	37	1.92%
2012	1,479	80.47%	324	17.63%	35	1.90%
2016	1,460	81.66%	233	13.03%	95	5.31%
2020	1,629	83.75%	281	14.45%	35	1.80%
2024	1,477	83.26%	261	14.71%	36	2.03%

Like all of Kansas outside the eastern cities, Osborne County is overwhelmingly Republican. No Democratic presidential candidate has won Osborne County since Woodrow Wilson in 1916. Only six of 27 Democratic presidential candidates since 1920 have reached so much as thirty percent of Osborne County's vote – the last of these being Michael Dukakis in 1988 during a major Great Plains drought.

=== Laws ===
Although the Kansas Constitution was amended in 1986 to allow the sale of alcoholic liquor by the individual drink with the approval of voters, Osborne County has remained a prohibition, or "dry", county.

== Education ==
=== Unified school districts ===
- Waconda USD 272
- Osborne County USD 392
- Paradise-Natoma-Waldo USD 399

== Communities ==
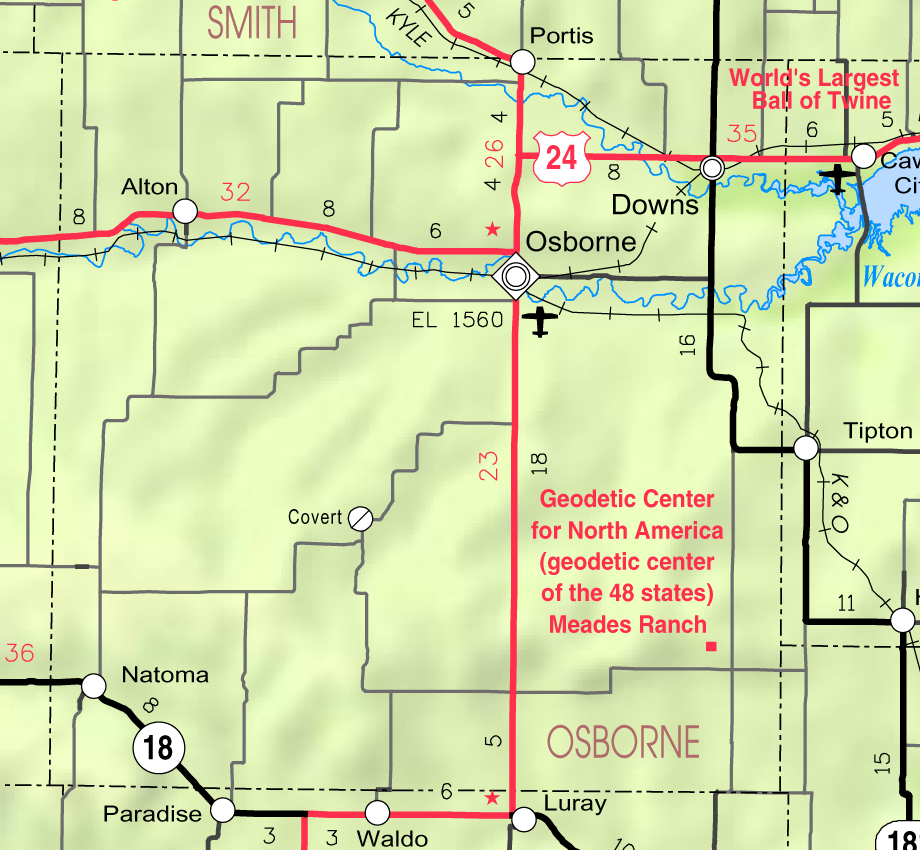
2005 map of Osborne County (map legend)

List of townships / incorporated cities / unincorporated communities / extinct former communities within Osborne County.

=== Cities ===
- Alton
- Downs
- Natoma
- Osborne (county seat)
- Portis

=== Unincorporated communities ===
- Bloomington
- Corinth
- Covert

=== Ghost towns ===
- Banks
- Bristow
- Cheyenne
- Delhi
- Deliverance
- Dial
- Forney
- Free Will
- Handy
- Potterville
- Roundmound
- Twin Creek
- Vincent
- Yoxall

=== Townships ===
Osborne County is divided into twenty-three townships. The city of Osborne is considered governmentally independent and is excluded from the census figures for the townships. In the following table, the population center is the largest city (or cities) included in that township's population total, if it is of a significant size.

Sources: 2000 U.S. Gazetteer from the U.S. Census Bureau.
Township	FIPS	Population center	Population	Population density /km^{2} (/sq mi)	Land area km^{2} (sq mi)	Water area km^{2} (sq mi)	Water %	Geographic coordinates
Bethany	06425	Portis	199	2 (6)	93 (36)	0 (0)	0%	39°31′58″N 98°39′54″W
Bloom	07400		81	1 (1)	140 (54)	0 (0)	0.02%	39°20′9″N 98°33′7″W
Corinth	15625		51	1 (1)	92 (35)	0 (0)	0.24%	39°25′38″N 98°32′32″W
Covert	16100		19	0 (1)	93 (36)	0 (0)	0.18%	39°15′25″N 98°46′49″W
Delhi	17500		37	0 (1)	139 (54)	0 (0)	0.31%	39°11′46″N 98°32′11″W
Grant	27875		28	0 (1)	91 (35)	1 (0)	0.55%	39°31′0″N 98°59′6″W
Hancock	29825		21	0 (1)	93 (36)	0 (0)	0.24%	39°21′36″N 98°38′36″W
Hawkeye	30850		36	0 (1)	92 (36)	0 (0)	0.46%	39°32′24″N 98°51′34″W
Independence	33925		32	0 (1)	92 (35)	0 (0)	0.24%	39°21′31″N 98°45′36″W
Jackson	34875		42	0 (1)	93 (36)	0 (0)	0.09%	39°11′2″N 98°38′54″W
Kill Creek	36750		35	0 (1)	93 (36)	0 (0)	0.20%	39°21′9″N 98°52′52″W
Lawrence	38925		37	0 (1)	90 (35)	0 (0)	0.37%	39°31′56″N 98°45′56″W
Liberty	40300		31	0 (1)	93 (36)	0 (0)	0.27%	39°11′33″N 98°54′29″W
Mount Ayr	48875		41	0 (1)	92 (36)	0 (0)	0.03%	39°21′0″N 98°59′11″W
Natoma	49450	Natoma	402	4 (11)	93 (36)	0 (0)	0.34%	39°11′8″N 99°0′49″W
Penn	55350		129	1 (3)	119 (46)	0 (0)	0.05%	39°26′29″N 98°39′59″W
Ross	61375	Downs	1,166	13 (33)	92 (35)	1 (0)	0.81%	39°30′30″N 98°32′46″W
Round Mound	61475		59	1 (2)	92 (36)	0 (0)	0.11%	39°16′23″N 99°0′7″W
Sumner	69150	Alton	206	1 (4)	139 (54)	0 (0)	0.01%	39°27′19″N 98°58′14″W
Tilden	70575		116	1 (3)	107 (41)	0 (0)	0.21%	39°26′15″N 98°48′58″W
Valley	73000		37	0 (1)	93 (36)	0 (0)	0.07%	39°9′52″N 98°45′44″W
Victor	73750		24	0 (1)	93 (36)	0 (0)	0.08%	39°16′16″N 98°53′13″W
Winfield	79975		16	0 (0)	93 (36)	0 (0)	0.20%	39°15′35″N 98°40′7″W

== See also ==
- National Register of Historic Places listings in Osborne County, Kansas
- Meades Ranch Triangulation Station, the geodetic base point for the North American Datum of 1927 (NAD 27), which was used as a reference point until 1989.

Community information for Kansas

- Kansas locations by per capita income
- List of counties in Kansas
- List of townships in Kansas
- List of cities in Kansas
- List of unincorporated communities in Kansas
- List of ghost towns in Kansas
