= Osborne, Kansas =

City in Osborne County, Kansas

- City and County seat
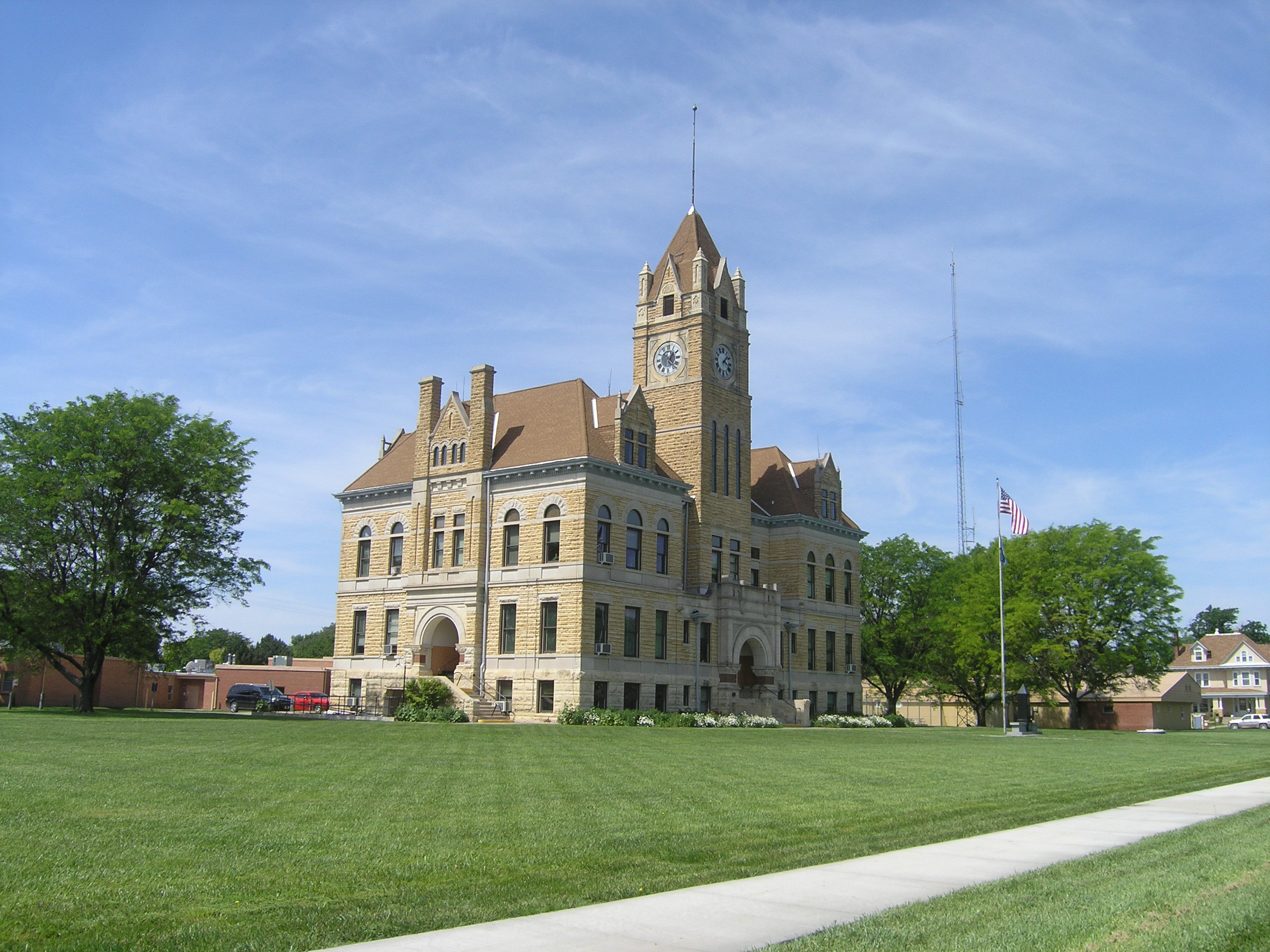
- Osborne County Courthouse (2012)

- Location within Osborne County and Kansas

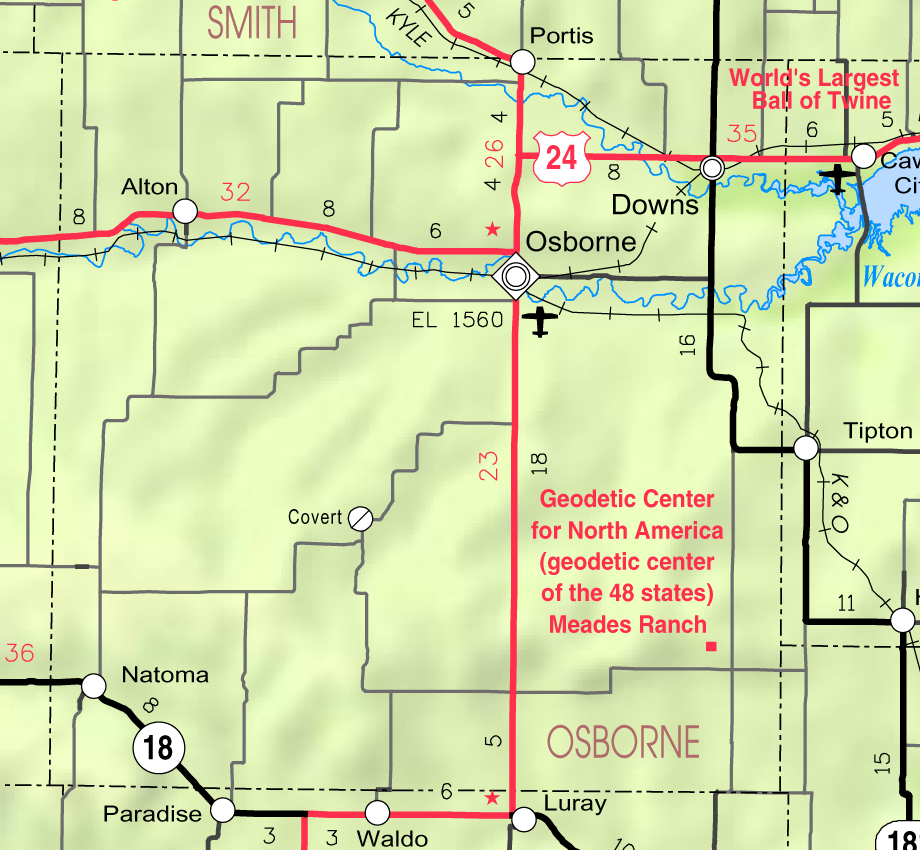
- KDOT map of Osborne County (legend)
- Coordinates: 39°26′26″N 98°41′58″W
- Country: United States
- State: Kansas
- County: Osborne
- Founded: 1871
- Incorporated: 1878
- Named for: Vincent Osborne

Government
  - Mayor: John McClure

Area
  - Total: 1.54 sq mi (3.99 km^{2})
  - Land: 1.54 sq mi (3.99 km^{2})
  - Water: 0 sq mi (0.00 km^{2})
- Elevation: 1,549 ft (472 m)

Population (2020)
  - Total: 1,335
  - Density: 867/sq mi (335/km^{2})
- Time zone: UTC-6 (CST)
  - Summer (DST): UTC-5 (CDT)
- ZIP Code: 67473
- Area code: 785
- FIPS code: 20-53325
- GNIS ID: 485636
- Website: discoverosborne.com

Osborne is a city in and the county seat of Osborne County, Kansas, United States. As of the 2020 census, the population of the city was 1,335.

== History ==
Settlers from southeastern Pennsylvania founded Osborne City in May 1871. They named the settlement after Vincent B. Osborne, a Union Army veteran of the American Civil War, after whom Osborne County also is named. Osborne City became the permanent county seat in November 1872. A district judge officially proclaimed it a city in May 1873, but the townspeople failed to legally organize a government. Five years later, a second attempt was successful, and the settlement was incorporated as a city in 1878. "City" was dropped from its name by the mid-1890s.

A bridge was built at Osborne over the Solomon River in 1878.

== Geography ==
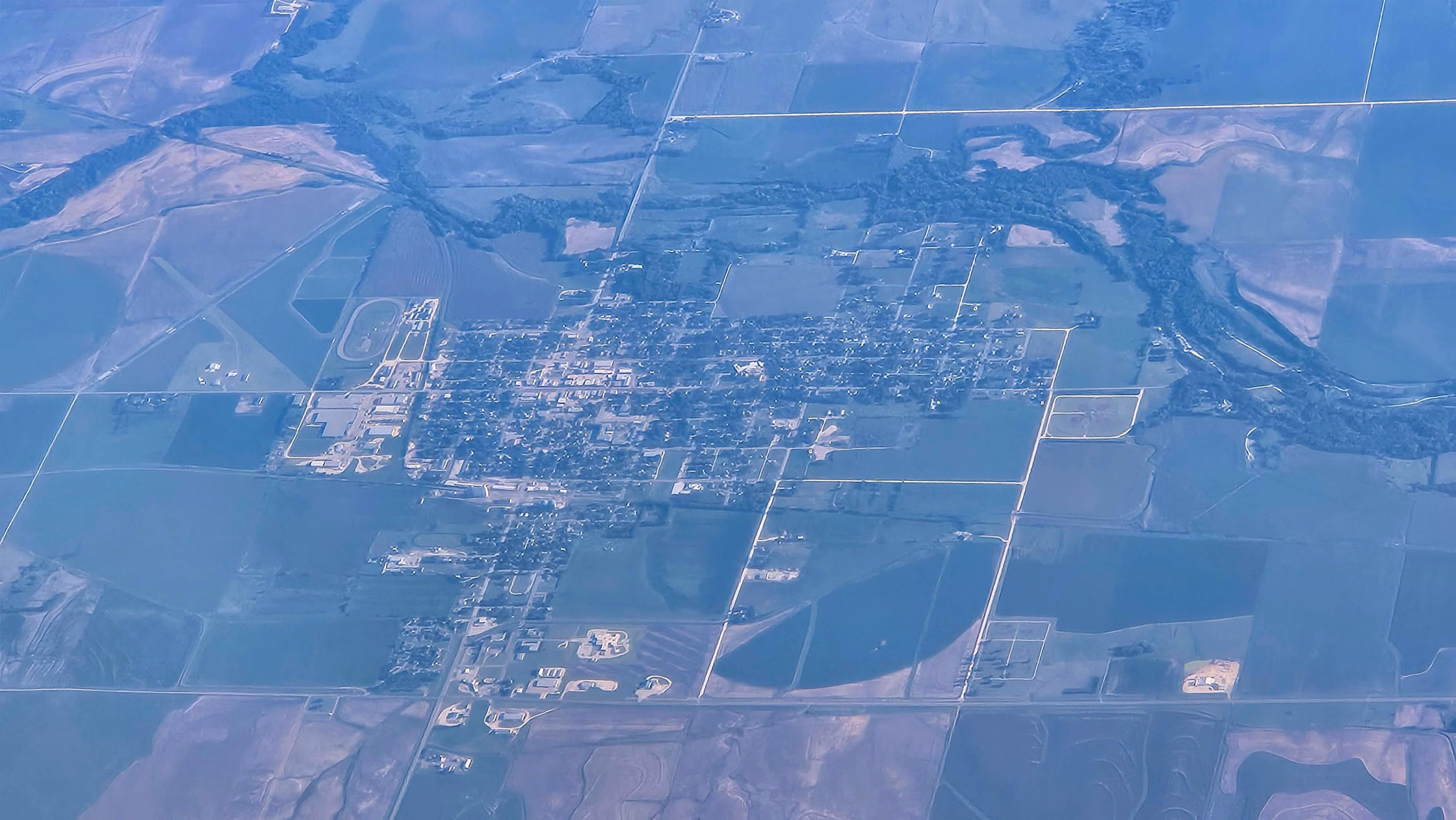
Osborne from above in 2023

Osborne is located at the intersection of U.S. Routes 24 and 281 in north-central Kansas; it is approximately 134 miles (216 km) northwest of Wichita, 219 miles (352 km) west-northwest of Kansas City and 339 miles (546 km) east of Denver.

Osborne lies on the north side of the South Fork Solomon River in the Smoky Hills region of the Great Plains. The Osborne Canal, part of the U.S. Bureau of Reclamation's Webster Unit Project, runs east along the northern edge of the city.

According to the United States Census Bureau, the city has a total area of 1.56 square miles (4.04 km^{2}), all land.

=== Climate ===
On average, in Osborne, July is the warmest month, January is the coldest and driest month, and May is the wettest month. The hottest temperature recorded in Osborne was 116 °F (47 °C) in 1940; the coldest temperature recorded was -31 °F (-35 °C) in 1989.

Climate data for Osborne, Kansas
Month	Jan	Feb	Mar	Apr	May	Jun	Jul	Aug	Sep	Oct	Nov	Dec	Year
Record high °F (°C)	80 (27)	87 (31)	94 (34)	106 (41)	105 (41)	113 (45)	116 (47)	113 (45)	112 (44)	103 (39)	88 (31)	82 (28)	116 (47)
Mean daily maximum °F (°C)	39 (4)	46 (8)	56 (13)	67 (19)	75 (24)	87 (31)	93 (34)	91 (33)	82 (28)	71 (22)	53 (12)	42 (6)	67 (20)
Mean daily minimum °F (°C)	12 (−11)	17 (−8)	26 (−3)	37 (3)	48 (9)	59 (15)	65 (18)	62 (17)	52 (11)	38 (3)	25 (−4)	16 (−9)	38 (3)
Record low °F (°C)	−24 (−31)	−22 (−30)	−17 (−27)	9 (−13)	21 (−6)	33 (1)	41 (5)	38 (3)	18 (−8)	6 (−14)	−10 (−23)	−31 (−35)	−31 (−35)
Average precipitation inches (mm)	0.60 (15)	0.80 (20)	2.21 (56)	2.58 (66)	4.02 (102)	3.20 (81)	3.91 (99)	3.12 (79)	2.30 (58)	1.63 (41)	1.60 (41)	0.76 (19)	26.73 (677)
Source: The Weather Channel

== Demographics ==
Historical population
Census	Pop.	Note	%±
1880	719		—
1890	1,174		63.3%
1900	1,075		−8.4%
1910	1,566		45.7%
1920	1,635		4.4%
1930	1,881		15.0%
1940	1,876		−0.3%
1950	2,068		10.2%
1960	2,049		−0.9%
1970	1,980		−3.4%
1980	2,120		7.1%
1990	1,778		−16.1%
2000	1,607		−9.6%
2010	1,431		−11.0%
2020	1,335		−6.7%
U.S. Decennial Census

=== 2020 census ===
The 2020 United States census counted 1,335 people, 602 households, and 349 families in Osborne. The population density was 867.4 per square mile (334.9/km^{2}). There were 727 housing units at an average density of 472.4 per square mile (182.4/km^{2}). The racial makeup was 94.53% (1,262) white or European American (93.93% non-Hispanic white), 0.07% (1) black or African-American, 0.45% (6) Native American or Alaska Native, 0.6% (8) Asian, 0.0% (0) Pacific Islander or Native Hawaiian, 0.75% (10) from other races, and 3.6% (48) from two or more races. Hispanic or Latino of any race was 1.87% (25) of the population.

Of the 602 households, 24.3% had children under the age of 18; 45.2% were married couples living together; 28.4% had a female householder with no spouse or partner present. 36.7% of households consisted of individuals, and 19.6% had someone living alone who was 65 years of age or older. The average household size was 2.0 and the average family size was 2.5. The percent of those with a bachelor's degree or higher was estimated to be 13.4% of the population.

21.1% of the population was under the age of 18, 5.6% from 18 to 24, 21.0% from 25 to 44, 26.1% from 45 to 64, and 26.1% who were 65 years of age or older. The median age was 48.6 years. For every 100 females, there were 108.9 males. For every 100 females ages 18 and older, there were 109.8 males.

The 2016–2020 5-year American Community Survey estimates show that the median household income was $39,167 (with a margin of error of +/- $9,636) and the median family income was $53,802 (+/- $8,147). Males had a median income of $38,269 (+/- $10,182) versus $23,393 (+/- $4,654) for females. The median income for those aged 16 and older was $26,875 (+/- $5,034). Approximately, 17.6% of families and 20.6% of the population were below the poverty line, including 39.2% of those under the age of 18 and 11.3% of those ages 65 or over.

=== 2010 census ===
As of the census of 2010, there were 1,431 people, 633 households, and 390 families residing in the city. The population density was 917.3 inhabitants per square mile (354.2/km^{2}). There were 776 housing units at an average density of 497.4 per square mile (192.0/km^{2}). The racial makeup of the city was 97.7% White, 0.1% African American, 0.6% Native American, 0.5% Asian, 0.4% from other races, and 0.6% from two or more races. Hispanic or Latino of any race were 1.3% of the population.

There were 633 households, of which 27.3% had children under the age of 18 living with them, 50.4% were married couples living together, 7.6% had a female householder with no husband present, 3.6% had a male householder with no wife present, and 38.4% were non-families. 36.0% of all households were made up of individuals, and 18.6% had someone living alone who was 65 years of age or older. The average household size was 2.16 and the average family size was 2.79.

The median age in the city was 48.1 years. 21.7% of residents were under the age of 18; 5.8% were between the ages of 18 and 24; 17.1% were from 25 to 44; 28.6% were from 45 to 64; and 27% were 65 years of age or older. The gender makeup of the city was 48.3% male and 51.7% female.

The median income for a household in the city was $35,400, and the median income for a family was $51,042. Males had a median income of $34,200 versus $20,880 for females. The per capita income for the city was $19,902. About 8.3% of families and 11.8% of the population were below the poverty line, including 12.8% of those under age 18 and 13.8% of those age 65 or over.

== Economy ==
As of 2013, 65.4% of the population aged 16 and older was in the labor force. 0.0% was in the armed forces, and 65.4% was in the civilian labor force with 62.8% being employed and 2.6% unemployed. The composition, by occupation, of the employed civilian labor force was: 28.7% in management, business, science, and arts; 27.4% in sales and office occupations; 18.3% in service occupations; 14.6% in production, transportation, and material moving; and 11.1% in natural resources, construction, and maintenance. The three industries employing the largest percentages of the working civilian labor force were: educational services, health care, and social assistance (18.2%); wholesale trade (11.3%); and retail trade (10.5%).

The cost of living in Osborne is relatively low; compared to the U.S. average of 100, the city's cost of living index is 79.4. As of 2013, the median home value in the city was $42,400, the median selected monthly owner cost was $627 for housing units with a mortgage and $329 for those without, and the median gross rent was $492.

== Government ==
Osborne is a city of the second class with a mayor–council form of government. The city council consists of six members and meets on the first and third Wednesday of each month.

As the county seat, Osborne is the administrative center of Osborne County. The county courthouse is located downtown, and all departments of the county government base their operations in the city.

Osborne lies within Kansas's 1st U.S. Congressional District. For the purposes of representation in the Kansas Legislature, the city is located in the 36th district of the Kansas Senate and the 109th district of the Kansas House of Representatives.

== Education ==
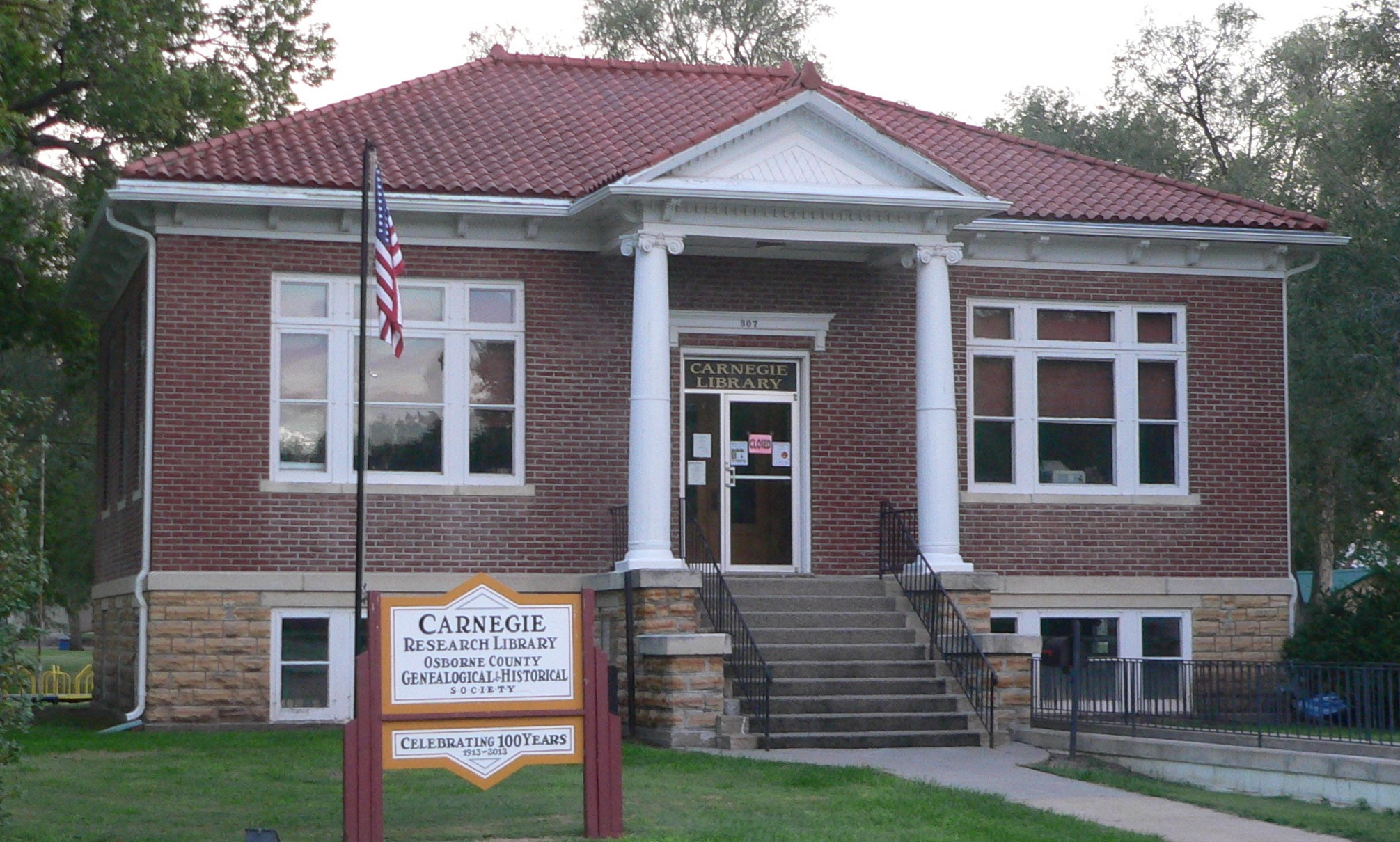
Osborne Carnegie Library (2014)

The community is served by Osborne USD 392 public school district, which provides public primary and secondary education, operating two schools in the city: Osborne Elementary School (Grades K-6) and Osborne Junior/Senior High School (7-12).

== Transportation ==
U.S. Route 281 runs north–south through Osborne, meeting U.S. Route 24, an east–west route, just north of the city. At the junction, U.S. 24 turns north and runs concurrently with U.S. 281.

Osborne Municipal Airport is located immediately southeast of the city. It is used primarily for general aviation.

Osborne is the western terminus of a line of the Kyle Railroad. The city is also the northwestern terminus of a line of the Kansas & Oklahoma Railroad.

== Media ==
One newspaper is published in Osborne, the weekly Osborne County Farmer.

Osborne is in the Wichita-Hutchinson, Kansas television market.

== Culture ==
=== Points of interest ===
The Osborne County Historical Museum exhibits artifacts from local history, including antique farm equipment, period clothing and housewares, and American Indian artifacts, and maintains on site a one-room school house built in 1912.

A roadside park at the north end of the city displays information about the geodetic center of North America, which is located roughly 18 miles (29 km) south-southeast of the city, and hosts a replica of the geodetic marker at the site.

== Notable people ==
Notable individuals who were born in and/or have lived in Osborne include:

- Chris Arpad (1967- ), steel drummer
- Fred Cornwell (1961- ), football tight end
- Josh Eilert (1983- ), American basketball coach
- Edward L. Kessel (1904-1997), biologist
- Joe Miller (1967- ), judge, Alaska politician
- Elsie Reasoner Ralph (25 April 1878 - 29 April 1913), first female war correspondent in US history
- Lee Wykoff (1898-1974), professional wrestler

== See also ==
- Meades Ranch Triangulation Station
