= Natoma Township, Kansas =

Township in Osborne County, Kansas, U.S.

Natoma Township
- Township
- Location within Osborne County
- Coordinates: 39.177248°N 98.9903°W
- Country: United States
- State: Kansas
- County: Osborne

Government
  - Third District Commissioner: Rex Johnston

Area
  - Total: 36.042 sq mi (93.35 km^{2})
  - Land: 35.919 sq mi (93.03 km^{2})
  - Water: 0.123 sq mi (0.32 km^{2}) 0.34%
- Elevation: 1,801 ft (549 m)

Population (2020)
  - Total: 316
  - Density: 8.80/sq mi (3.40/km^{2})
- Time zone: UTC-6 (CST)
  - Summer (DST): UTC-5 (CDT)
- Area code: 785
- GNIS feature ID: 472450

Natoma Township is a township in Osborne County, Kansas, United States. As of the 2020 census, its population was 316.

== Geography ==
Natoma Township covers an area of 36.042 square miles (93.35 square kilometers).

=== Communities ===
- Natoma

=== Adjacent townships ===
- Round Mound Township, Osborne County (north)
- Victor Township, Osborne County (northeast)
- Liberty Township, Osborne County (east)
- Paradise Township, Russell County (south)
- Herzog Township, Ellis County (southwest)
- Township 12, Rooks County (west)

== Transportation ==
=== Major highways ===
- K-18
