= Township 1, Rooks County, Kansas =

Township in Rooks County, Kansas, U.S.

Township 1
- Township
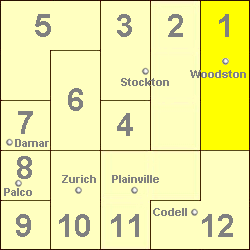
- Location in Rooks County

- Location within state of Kansas
- Coordinates: 39°26′17″N 99°06′03″W
- Country: United States
- State: Kansas
- County: Rooks
- Established: 1971

Area
  - Total: 106.981 sq mi (277.08 km^{2})
  - Land: 106.735 sq mi (276.44 km^{2})
  - Water: 0.246 sq mi (0.64 km^{2}) 0.23%
- Elevation: 1,680 ft (510 m)

Population (2020)
  - Total: 196
  - Density: 1.84/sq mi (0.709/km^{2})
- Time zone: UTC-6 (CST)
  - Summer (DST): UTC-5 (CDT)
- Area code: 785
- GNIS feature ID: 472247

Township 1 is a township in Rooks County, Kansas, United States. Woodston is the largest population center in Township 1. As of the 2020 census, its population was 196.

== History ==
Rooks County was established with four townships: Bow Creek, Lowell, Paradise and Stockton. That number increased to seven by 1878 and twenty three in 1925. The twenty three townships were in place until 1971, when the number was reduced to the current twelve townships.

Township 1 was formed from Rooks County townships Ash Rock, Lowell and Medicine in 1971, pursuant to Kansas Statute 80-1110. The statute allowed for the dissolution of townships and the assignment of those territories to contiguous townships.

Buros Creek flows through the northern part of Township 1 into South Fork Solomon River. Medicine Creek flows through the southern part of Township 1 into South Fork Solomon River.

=== Ash Rock Township ===
Ash Rock Township was established in 1877 from part of Lowell Township. The township was named for a petrified tree trunk found by an early settler, H. C. Olds. The Stone Church built in 1883 is a landmark from Ash Rock township.

=== Lowell Township ===
Lowell Township was one of the four original Rooks County civil townships along with Bow Creek, Paradise and Stockton. The original Lowell Township was 18 miles north-to-south (three survey townships). The western border was with Bow Creek and Stockton Townships, while the eastern boundary was the Osborne County line, making it nine miles (1-1/2 survey townships) wide. Lowell originally included territory that would become Ash Rock, Medicine and parts of Greenfield, Iowa and Lanark townships.

The South Fork Solomon River traversed Lowell Township.

=== Medicine Township ===
Medicine Township was established in 1879 from part of Lowell Township. The township was named for Medicine Creek that traversed the township to the South Fork Solomon River. Medicine Creek was called "heap big medicine" by Native Americans.

== Geography ==
Township 1 covers an area of 106.981 square miles (277.08 square kilometers).

=== Communities ===
- Woodston

=== Adjacent townships ===
Valley Township, Phillips County
		north	northeast	Dor Township, Smith County
Township 2, Rooks County	west	self	east	Grant Township, Osborne County; Sumner Township, Osborne County; Mount Ayr Township, Osborne County
Township 11, Rooks County	southwest	south	southeast	Round Mound Township, Osborne County
Township 12, Rooks County

== Transportation ==
=== Major highways ===
- US-24
