= Motor, Kansas =

- Ghost town
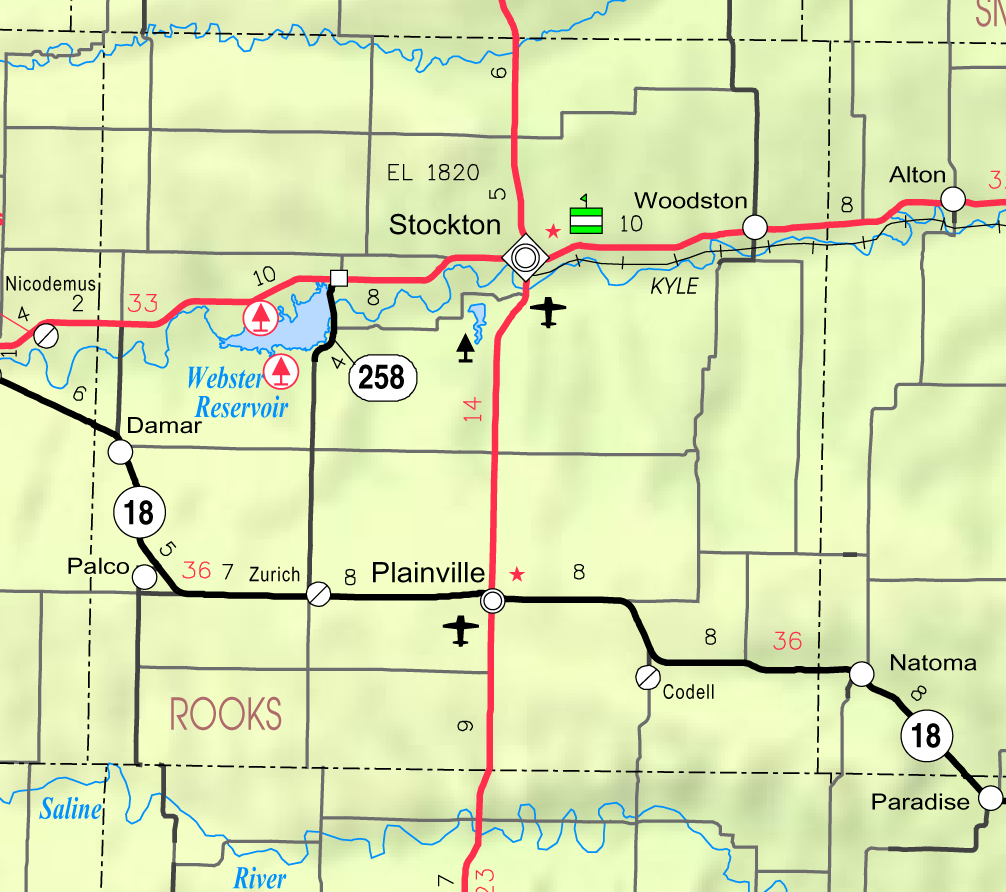
- KDOT map of Rooks County (legend)

- Location within Kansas Location within the United States
- Coordinates: 39°11′37″N 99°09′31″W
- Country: United States
- State: Kansas
- County: Rooks
- Elevation: 1,955 ft (596 m)

Population
  - Total: 0
- Time zone: UTC-6 (CST)
  - Summer (DST): UTC-5 (CDT)
- Area code: 785
- GNIS ID: 482533

Motor is a ghost town in Paradise Township, Rooks County, Kansas, United States.

== History ==
Motor was located three-quarters of a mile to the east of Codell. The town had two stores, a hotel and restaurant, a blacksmith shop, a wind driven grist mill and a saw mill. The Floreyville post office was moved to Motor and a school was established in 1879. The first school building was constructed of sod. A frame schoolhouse was built in 1886 and served the community until 1894.

In 1879, Motor failed to negotiate an agreement to establish a depot with Union Pacific Railroad. Union Pacific instead founded the community of Codell as a railroad town. Most of the frame buildings in Motor were moved to the growing community of Codell. In 1889, the Motor post office was moved to Codell, then Motor was soon abandoned.
