= Jackson Township, Osborne County, Kansas =

Township in Osborne County, Kansas, U.S.

Jackson Township
- Township
- Location within Osborne County
- Coordinates: 39.169508°N 98.666713°W
- Country: United States
- State: Kansas
- County: Osborne

Government
  - Third District Commissioner: Rex Johnston

Area
  - Total: 35.949 sq mi (93.11 km^{2})
  - Land: 35.918 sq mi (93.03 km^{2})
  - Water: 0.031 sq mi (0.080 km^{2}) 0.09%
- Elevation: 1,729 ft (527 m)

Population (2020)
  - Total: 30
  - Density: 0.84/sq mi (0.32/km^{2})
- Time zone: UTC-6 (CST)
  - Summer (DST): UTC-5 (CDT)
- Area code: 785
- GNIS feature ID: 472278

Jackson Township is a township in Osborne County, Kansas, United States. As of the 2020 census, its population was 30.

== Geography ==
Jackson Township covers an area of 35.949 square miles (93.11 square kilometers).

=== Adjacent townships ===
- Winfield Township, Osborne County (north)
- Delhi Township, Osborne County (east)
- Luray Township, Russell County (south)
- Waldo Township, Russell County (southwest)
- Valley Township, Osborne County (west)
- Covert Township, Osborne County (northwest)

== Transportation ==
=== Major highways ===
- US-281
