= Mount Ayr Township, Kansas =

Township in Osborne County, Kansas, U.S.

Mount Ayr Township
- Township
- Location within Osborne County
- Coordinates: 39.349881°N 98.986625°W
- Country: United States
- State: Kansas
- County: Osborne

Government
  - Third District Commissioner: Rex Johnston

Area
  - Total: 35.726 sq mi (92.53 km^{2})
  - Land: 35.716 sq mi (92.50 km^{2})
  - Water: 0.01 sq mi (0.026 km^{2}) 0.03%
- Elevation: 1,887 ft (575 m)

Population (2020)
  - Total: 15
  - Density: 0.42/sq mi (0.16/km^{2})
- Time zone: UTC-6 (CST)
  - Summer (DST): UTC-5 (CDT)
- Area code: 785
- GNIS feature ID: 472252

Mount Ayr Township is a township in Osborne County, Kansas, United States. As of the 2020 census, its population was 15.

== Geography ==
Mount Ayr Township covers an area of 35.726 square miles (92.53 square kilometers).

=== Adjacent townships ===
- Sumner Township, Osborne County (north)
- Kill Creek Township, Osborne County (east)
- Victor Township, Osborne County (southeast)
- Round Mound Township, Osborne County (south)
- Township 12, Rooks County (southwest)
- Township 1, Rooks County (west)
