= Natoma Presbyterian Church =

Historic church in Kansas, United States

- U.S. National Register of Historic Places
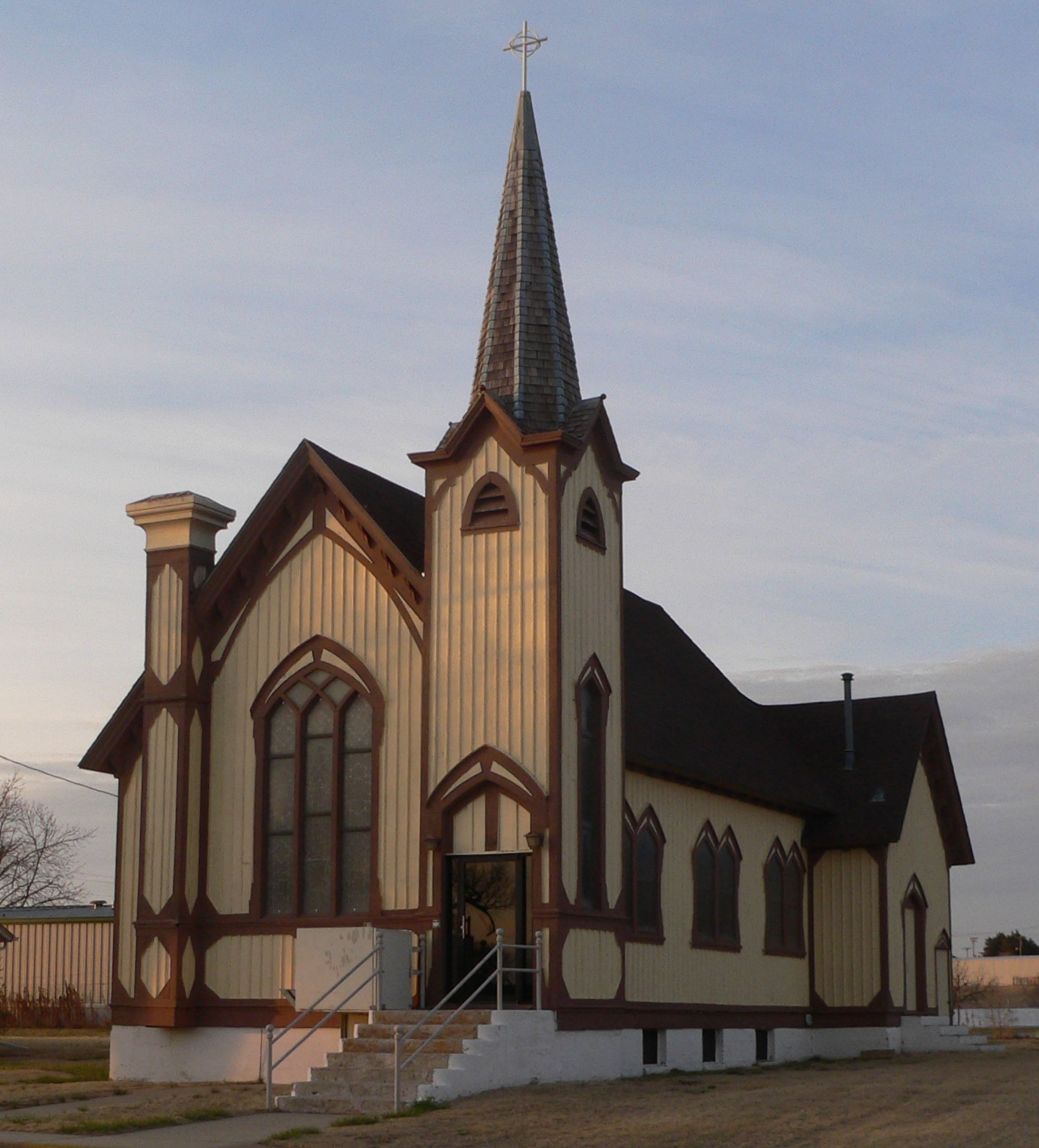

- Location within Kansas Location within the United States
- Location: 408 N. 3rd St., Natoma, Kansas
- Coordinates: 39.1899°N 99.021479°W
- Built: 1899
- Built by: Beisner, L.C.; Pohlman, A. Henry
- Architectural style: Gothic Revival
- NRHP reference No.: 06001052
- Added to NRHP: November 21, 2006

Natoma Presbyterian Church is a church at 408 N. 3rd Street in Natoma, Kansas. It was built in 1899 and added to the National Register of Historic Places in 2006.

It is a one-story wood-frame gable-front church. It has an octagonal steeple. Several elements of its design, including pointed tops of windows, are Gothic Revival in style.
