= Harlan Township, Smith County, Kansas =

Township in Smith County, Kansas, U.S.

Harlan Township
- Township
- Location within Smith County
- Coordinates: 39.607422°N 98.789554°W
- Country: United States
- State: Kansas
- County: Smith

Government
  - Trustee: Randy Lehmkuhl

Area
  - Total: 35.923 sq mi (93.04 km^{2})
  - Land: 35.904 sq mi (92.99 km^{2})
  - Water: 0.019 sq mi (0.049 km^{2}) 0.05%

Population (2020)
  - Total: 70
  - Density: 1.9/sq mi (0.75/km^{2})
- Time zone: UTC-6 (CST)
  - Summer (DST): UTC-5 (CDT)
- Area code: 785
- GNIS feature ID: 472072

Harlan Township is a township in Smith County, Kansas, United States. As of the 2020 census, its population was 70.

== History ==
Harlan Township was created from part of Houston Township.

== Geography ==
Harlan Township covers an area of 35.923 square miles (93.04 square kilometers). The North Fork Solomon River flows through it, as well as Lawrence Creek and Spring Creek.

=== Communities ===
- Harlan

=== Adjacent townships ===
Banner Township, Smith County
		north	northeast	Crystal Plains Township, Smith County
Houston Township, Smith County	west	self	east	Garfield Township, Smith County
Hawkeye Township, Osborne County	southwest	south
Lawrence Township, Osborne County

== Transportation ==
=== Major highways ===
- US-281
- K-9

== Demographics ==
As of the 2020 census, there were 70 people and 7 households residing in the township. The population density was 1.9 people per square mile (0.73 people/km^{2}). There were 20 housing units. The racial makeup of the township was 95.7% White, 1.4% Native American, 1.4% Asian, and 1.4% from two or more races. Hispanics or Latinos of any race were 0.0% of the population.

There were 7 households: 100% were married couples living together. The average family size was 6.14 people. 100% of people in the township older than 24 had a college degree, and the township had an employment rate of 41.2%.
