= Liberty Township, Osborne County, Kansas =

Township in Osborne County, Kansas, U.S.

Liberty Township
- Township
- Location within Osborne County
- Coordinates: 39.184322°N 98.869566°W
- Country: United States
- State: Kansas
- County: Osborne

Government
  - Third District Commissioner: Rex Johnston

Area
  - Total: 35.889 sq mi (92.95 km^{2})
  - Land: 35.792 sq mi (92.70 km^{2})
  - Water: 0.097 sq mi (0.25 km^{2}) 0.27%
- Elevation: 1,939 ft (591 m)

Population (2020)
  - Total: 15
  - Density: 0.42/sq mi (0.16/km^{2})
- Time zone: UTC-6 (CST)
  - Summer (DST): UTC-5 (CDT)
- Area code: 785
- GNIS feature ID: 472456

Liberty Township is a township in Osborne County, Kansas, United States. As of the 2020 census, its population was 15.

== Geography ==
Liberty Township covers an area of 35.889 square miles (92.95 square kilometers).

=== Adjacent townships ===
- Victor Township, Osborne County (north)
- Covert Township, Osborne County (northeast)
- Valley Township, Osborne County (east)
- Paradise Township, Russell County (south)
- Natoma Township, Osborne County (west)
- Round Mound Township, Osborne County (northwest)

== Transportation ==
=== Major highways ===
- K-18
