= Tilden Township, Kansas =

Township in Osborne County, Kansas, U.S.

Tilden Township
- Township
- Location within Osborne County
- Coordinates: 39.440268°N 98.817095°W
- Country: United States
- State: Kansas
- County: Osborne

Government
  - Second District Commissioner: Troy Schaefer

Area
  - Total: 41.191 sq mi (106.68 km^{2})
  - Land: 41.104 sq mi (106.46 km^{2})
  - Water: 0.087 sq mi (0.23 km^{2}) 0.21%
- Elevation: 1,562 ft (476 m)

Population (2020)
  - Total: 72
  - Density: 1.8/sq mi (0.68/km^{2})
- Time zone: UTC-6 (CST)
  - Summer (DST): UTC-5 (CDT)
- Area code: 785
- GNIS feature ID: 472266

Tilden Township is a township in Osborne County, Kansas, United States. As of the 2020 census, its population was 72.

== History ==
The first non-native permanent settlement in Osborne County was created by the brothers Charles and William Bullock within the area that would become Tilden Township.

== Geography ==
Tilden Township covers an area of 41.191 square miles (106.68 square kilometers). The South Fork Solomon River flows through it.

=== Adjacent townships ===
- Lawrence Township, Osborne County (northeast)
- Penn Township, Osborne County (east)
- Independence Township, Osborne County (southeast)
- Kill Creek Township, Osborne County (southwest)
- Sumner Township, Osborne County (west)
- Hawkeye Township, Osborne County (northwest)

== Transportation ==
=== Major highways ===
- US-24
