= Winfield Township, Kansas =

Township in Osborne County, Kansas, U.S.

Winfield Township
- Township
- Location within Osborne County
- Coordinates: 39.264289°N 98.666184°W
- Country: United States
- State: Kansas
- County: Osborne
- Established: 1871

Government
  - Third District Commissioner: Rex Johnston

Area
  - Total: 35.955 sq mi (93.12 km^{2})
  - Land: 35.885 sq mi (92.94 km^{2})
  - Water: 0.07 sq mi (0.18 km^{2}) 0.19%
- Elevation: 1,696 ft (517 m)

Population (2020)
  - Total: 17
  - Density: 0.47/sq mi (0.18/km^{2})
- Time zone: UTC-6 (CST)
  - Summer (DST): UTC-5 (CDT)
- Area code: 785
- GNIS feature ID: 472400

Winfield Township is a township in Osborne County, Kansas, United States. As of the 2020 census, its population was 17.

== History ==
Winfield Township was established in May 1871 by C. H. McHugh.

== Geography ==
Winfield Township covers an area of 35.955 square miles (93.12 square kilometers).

=== Adjacent townships ===
- Hancock Township, Osborne County (north)
- Bloom Township, Osborne County (northeast)
- Delhi Township, Osborne County (southeast)
- Jackson Township, Osborne County (south)
- Valley Township, Osborne County (southwest)
- Covert Township, Osborne County (west)
- Independence Township, Osborne County (northwest)

== Transportation ==
=== Major highways ===
- US-281
