= Valley Township, Osborne County, Kansas =

Township in Osborne County, Kansas, U.S.

Valley Township
- Township
- Location within Osborne County
- Coordinates: 39.178939°N 98.768329°W
- Country: United States
- State: Kansas
- County: Osborne

Government
  - Third District Commissioner: Rex Johnston

Area
  - Total: 36.119 sq mi (93.55 km^{2})
  - Land: 36.095 sq mi (93.49 km^{2})
  - Water: 0.024 sq mi (0.062 km^{2}) 0.07%
- Elevation: 1,726 ft (526 m)

Population (2020)
  - Total: 18
  - Density: 0.50/sq mi (0.19/km^{2})
- Time zone: UTC-6 (CST)
  - Summer (DST): UTC-5 (CDT)
- Area code: 785
- GNIS feature ID: 472457

Valley Township is a township in Osborne County, Kansas, United States. As of the 2020 census, its population was 18.

== Geography ==
Valley Township covers an area of 36.119 square miles (93.55 square kilometers).

=== Adjacent townships ===
- Covert Township, Osborne County (north)
- Winfield Township, Osborne County (northeast)
- Jackson Township, Osborne County (east)
- Waldo Township, Russell County (south)
- Paradise Township, Russell County (southwest)
- Liberty Township, Osborne County (west)
- Victor Township, Osborne County (northwest)
