= Houston Township, Kansas =

Township in Smith County, Kansas, U.S.

Houston Township
- Township
- Location within Smith County
- Coordinates: 39.614922°N 98.885878°W
- Country: United States
- State: Kansas
- County: Smith
- Established: 1875

Government
  - Trustee: Dennis Lehmann

Area
  - Total: 35.922 sq mi (93.04 km^{2})
  - Land: 35.867 sq mi (92.90 km^{2})
  - Water: 0.055 sq mi (0.14 km^{2}) 0.15%

Population (2020)
  - Total: 139
  - Density: 3.88/sq mi (1.50/km^{2})
- Time zone: UTC-6 (CST)
  - Summer (DST): UTC-5 (CDT)
- Area code: 785
- GNIS feature ID: 472060

Houston Township is a township in Smith County, Kansas, United States. As of the 2020 census, its population was 139.

== History ==
Houston Township was established in 1875 as one of the original nine townships of Smith County. The first settler in what would become Houston Township was John Rhodes, who settled there in October 1870. Later, Banner Township, Harlan Township, Crystal Plains Township, and Garfield Township would be created from parts of Houston Township. Modern Houston Township was also moved to include land that used to be in Harvey Township, and modern Harvey Township would gain land from former Houston Township as well.

== Geography ==
Houston Township covers an area of 35.922 square miles (93.04 square kilometers). The North Fork Solomon River flows through it, as well as Glen Rock Creek and Beaver Creek.

=== Communities ===
- Gaylord

=== Adjacent townships ===
Harvey Township, Smith County
		north	northeast	Banner Township, Smith County
Dor Township, Smith County	west	self	east	Harlan Township, Smith County
Grant Township, Osborne County	southwest	south
Hawkeye Township, Osborne County

== Transportation ==
=== Major highways ===
- K-9

== Demographics ==
As of the 2020 census, there were 139 people and 39 households residing in the township. The population density was 3.88 people per square mile (1.50 people/km^{2}). There were 69 housing units. The racial makeup of the township was 93.5% White, 3.6% Black or African American, 1.4% from some other race, and 1.4% from two or more races. Hispanics or Latinos of any race were 1.4% of the population.

There were 39 households: 53.8% were married couples living together, 38.5% had a male householder with no spouse present, and 7.7% had a female householder with no spouse present. The average family size was 2.39 people. 28.2% of people in the township older than 24 had a college degree, and the township had an employment rate of 64.8%.
