= Victor Township, Kansas =

Township in Osborne County, Kansas, U.S.

Victor Township
- Township
- Location within Osborne County
- Coordinates: 39.256694°N 98.880757°W
- Country: United States
- State: Kansas
- County: Osborne

Government
  - Third District Commissioner: Rex Johnston

Area
  - Total: 35.89 sq mi (93.0 km^{2})
  - Land: 35.862 sq mi (92.88 km^{2})
  - Water: 0.028 sq mi (0.073 km^{2}) 0.08%
- Elevation: 1,952 ft (595 m)

Population (2020)
  - Total: 15
  - Density: 0.42/sq mi (0.16/km^{2})
- Time zone: UTC-6 (CST)
  - Summer (DST): UTC-5 (CDT)
- Area code: 785
- GNIS feature ID: 472457

Victor Township, also called Victory Township on some maps, is a township in Osborne County, Kansas, United States. As of the 2020 census, its population was 15.

== Geography ==
Victor Township covers an area of 35.89 square miles (93.0 square kilometers).

=== Adjacent townships ===
- Kill Creek Township, Osborne County (north)
- Independence Township, Osborne County (northeast)
- Covert Township, Osborne County (east)
- Valley Township, Osborne County (southeast)
- Liberty Township, Osborne County (south)
- Natoma Township, Osborne County (southwest)
- Round Mound Township, Osborne County (west)
- Mount Ayr Township, Osborne County (northwest)
