= Delhi Township, Kansas =

Township in Osborne County, Kansas, U.S.

Delhi Township
- Township
- Location within Osborne County
- Coordinates: 39.200776°N 98.548087°W
- Country: United States
- State: Kansas
- County: Osborne

Area
  - Total: 53.751 sq mi (139.21 km^{2})
  - Land: 53.586 sq mi (138.79 km^{2})
  - Water: 0.165 sq mi (0.43 km^{2}) 0.31%
- Elevation: 1,696 ft (517 m)

Population (2020)
  - Total: 30
  - Density: 0.56/sq mi (0.22/km^{2})
- Time zone: UTC-6 (CST)
  - Summer (DST): UTC-5 (CDT)
- Area code: 785
- GNIS feature ID: 472402

Delhi Township is a township in Osborne County, Kansas, United States. As of the 2020 census, its population was 30.

== Geography ==
Delhi Township covers an area of 53.751 square miles (139.21 square kilometers). The Geodetic Center of North America lies within the township.

=== Adjacent townships ===
- Bloom Township, Osborne County (north)
- Custer Township, Mitchell County (northeast)
- Cedron Township, Lincoln Township (east)
- Fairview Township, Russell County (south)
- Luray Township, Russell County (southwest)
- Jackson Township, Osborne County (west)
- Winfield Township, Osborne County (northwest)
