= Round Mound Township, Kansas =

Township in Osborne County, Kansas, U.S.

Round Mound Township
- Township
- Location within Osborne County
- Coordinates: 39.270512°N 98.983363°W
- Country: United States
- State: Kansas
- County: Osborne

Government
  - Third District Commissioner: Rex Johnston

Area
  - Total: 35.721 sq mi (92.52 km^{2})
  - Land: 35.682 sq mi (92.42 km^{2})
  - Water: 0.039 sq mi (0.10 km^{2}) 0.11%
- Elevation: 2,038 ft (621 m)

Population (2020)
  - Total: 31
  - Density: 0.87/sq mi (0.34/km^{2})
- Time zone: UTC-6 (CST)
  - Summer (DST): UTC-5 (CDT)
- Area code: 785
- GNIS feature ID: 472392

Round Mound Township is a township in Osborne County, Kansas, United States. As of the 2020 census, its population was 31.

== Geography ==
Round Mound Township covers an area of 35.721 square miles (92.52 square kilometers).

=== Adjacent townships ===
- Mount Ayr Township, Osborne County (north)
- Kill Creek Township, Osborne County (northeast)
- Victor Township, Osborne County (east)
- Liberty Township, Osborne County (southeast)
- Natoma Township, Osborne County (south)
- Township 12, Rooks County (west)
- Township 1, Rooks County (northwest)
