= Covert, Kansas =

Unincorporated community in Osborne County, Kansas

- Unincorporated community
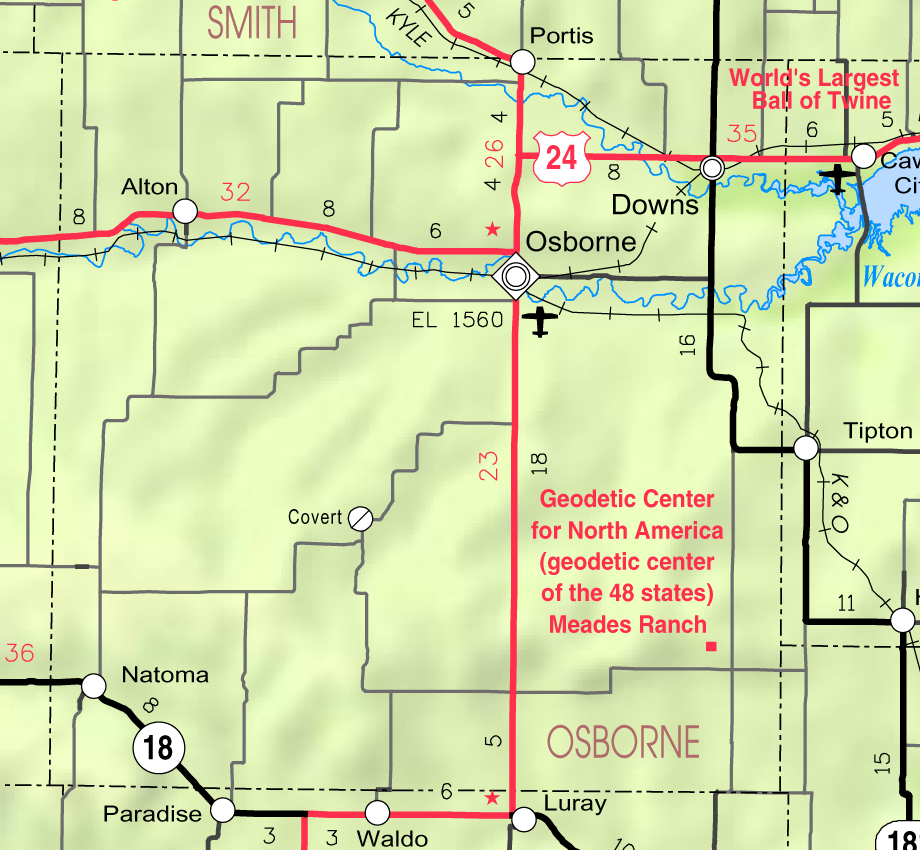
- KDOT map of Osborne County (legend)

- Location within Kansas Location within the United States
- Coordinates: 39°16′49″N 98°48′39″W
- Country: United States
- State: Kansas
- County: Osborne
- Township: Covert
- Founded: 1880
- Platted: 1880
- Elevation: 1,762 ft (537 m)
- Time zone: UTC-6 (CST)
  - Summer (DST): UTC-5 (CDT)
- Area code: 785
- FIPS code: 20-16075
- GNIS ID: 484597

Covert is an unincorporated community in Covert Township, Osborne County, Kansas, United States. It is located southwest of Osborne.

== History ==
Covert was founded and laid out in 1880. At its height, the population was 150.

A post office was opened at Covert in 1873, and remained in operation until it was discontinued in 1961.

The town is known for the 1923 discovery of the Covert Meteorite, and for "the unsolved murders of the Albert Kaser family in 1928".

== Geography ==
=== Climate ===
The climate in this area is characterized by hot, humid summers and generally mild to cool winters. According to the Köppen Climate Classification system, Covert has a humid subtropical climate, abbreviated "Cfa" on climate maps.

== Education ==
Covert's rural high school district was organized in 1915. The high school burned down in 1951, and was closed permanently the following year. The school did not have a mascot until 1947–1951, when it was Covert Wildcats. The town team mascot was Covert Coyotes.
