= Covert Township, Kansas =

Township in Osborne County, Kansas, U.S.

Covert Township
- Township
- Location within Osborne County
- Coordinates: 39.287559°N 98.75361°W
- Country: United States
- State: Kansas
- County: Osborne

Area
  - Total: 35.912 sq mi (93.01 km^{2})
  - Land: 35.849 sq mi (92.85 km^{2})
  - Water: 0.063 sq mi (0.16 km^{2}) 0.18%
- Elevation: 1,942 ft (592 m)

Population (2020)
  - Total: 15
  - Density: 0.42/sq mi (0.16/km^{2})
- Time zone: UTC-6 (CST)
  - Summer (DST): UTC-5 (CDT)
- Area code: 785
- GNIS feature ID: 472396

Covert Township is a township in Osborne County, Kansas, United States. As of the 2020 census, its population was 15.

== Geography ==
Covert Township covers an area of 35.912 square miles (93.01 square kilometers).

=== Communities ===
- Covert

=== Adjacent townships ===
- Independence Township, Osborne County (north)
- Hancock Township, Osborne County (northeast)
- Winfield Township, Osborne County (east)
- Jackson Township, Osborne County (southeast)
- Valley Township, Osborne County (south)
- Liberty Township, Osborne County (southwest)
- Victor Township, Osborne County (west)
- Kill Creek Township, Osborne County (northwest)
