= Garfield Township, Smith County, Kansas =

Township in Smith County, Kansas, U.S.

Garfield Township
- Township
- Location within Smith County
- Coordinates: 39.618263°N 98.673291°W
- Country: United States
- State: Kansas
- County: Smith

Government
  - Trustee: Gary Wolters

Area
  - Total: 35.899 sq mi (92.98 km^{2})
  - Land: 35.884 sq mi (92.94 km^{2})
  - Water: 0.015 sq mi (0.039 km^{2}) 0.04%

Population (2020)
  - Total: 31
  - Density: 0.86/sq mi (0.33/km^{2})
- Time zone: UTC-6 (CST)
  - Summer (DST): UTC-5 (CDT)
- Area code: 785
- GNIS feature ID: 472074

Garfield Township is a township in Smith County, Kansas, United States. As of the 2020 census, its population was 31.

== History ==
Garfield Township was created from parts of Houston Township and Lincoln Township.

== Geography ==
Garfield Township covers an area of 35.899 square miles (92.98 square kilometers). The North Fork Solomon River flows through it, as well as Lindley Creek and Twelvemile Creek.

=== Adjacent townships ===
Crystal Plains Township, Smith County
Banner Township, Smith County	northwest	north	northeast	Webster Township, Smith County
Harlan Township, Smith County	west	self	east	Lincoln Township, Smith County
Lawrence Township, Osborne County	southwest	south
Bethany Township, Osborne County

== Transportation ==
=== Major highways ===
- US-281
- K-9

== Demographics ==
As of the 2020 census, there were 31 people and 5 households residing in the township. The population density was 0.86 people per square mile (0.33 people/km^{2}). There were 14 housing units. The racial makeup of the township was 100% White. Hispanics or Latinos of any race were 3.2% of the population.

There were 5 households: 100% were married couples living together. The average family size was 2.00 people. 0.0% of people in the township older than 24 had a college degree, and the township had an employment rate of 50.0%.
