= Sumner Township, Osborne County, Kansas =

Township in Osborne County, Kansas, U.S.

Sumner Township
- Township
- Location within Osborne County
- Coordinates: 39.428881°N 98.962791°W
- Country: United States
- State: Kansas
- County: Osborne

Government
  - Third District Commissioner: Rex Johnston

Area
  - Total: 53.644 sq mi (138.94 km^{2})
  - Land: 53.636 sq mi (138.92 km^{2})
  - Water: 0.008 sq mi (0.021 km^{2}) 0.01%
- Elevation: 1,768 ft (539 m)

Population (2020)
  - Total: 172
  - Density: 3.21/sq mi (1.24/km^{2})
- Time zone: UTC-6 (CST)
  - Summer (DST): UTC-5 (CDT)
- Area code: 785
- GNIS feature ID: 472251

Sumner Township is a township in Osborne County, Kansas, United States. As of the 2020 census, its population was 172.

== Geography ==
Sumner Township covers an area of 53.644 square miles (138.94 square kilometers). The South Fork Solomon River flows through it.

=== Communities ===
- Alton

=== Adjacent townships ===
- Grant Township, Osborne County (north)
- Hawkeye Township, Osborne County (northeast)
- Tilden Township, Osborne County (east)
- Kill Creek Township, Osborne County (southeast)
- Mount Ayr Township, Osborne County (south)
- Township 1, Rooks County (west)

== Transportation ==
=== Major highways ===
- US-24
