= Kill Creek Township, Kansas =

Township in Osborne County, Kansas, U.S.

Kill Creek Township Osborne County, Kansas
- Township
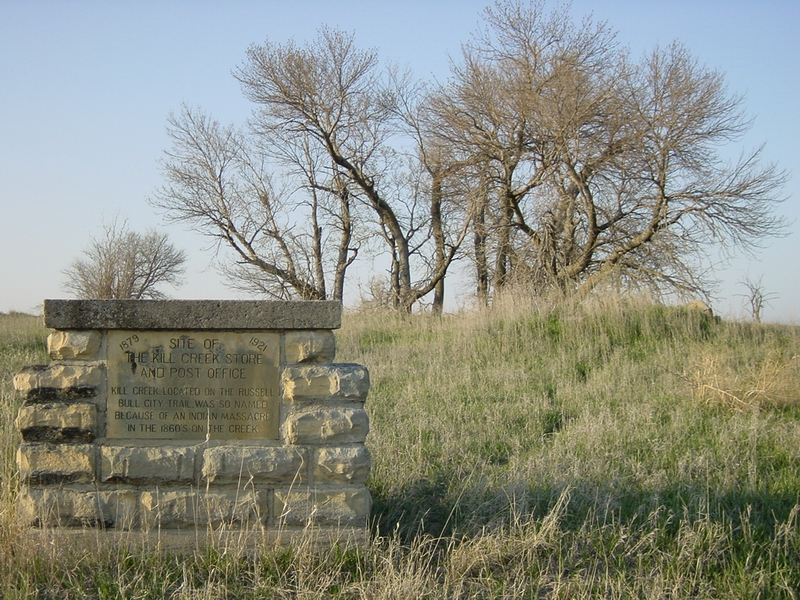
- Kill Creek, Kansas

- Location within Osborne County
- Coordinates: 39°21′9″N 98°52′52″W
- Country: United States
- State: Kansas
- County: Osborne
- Established: 1872

Government
  - Third District Commissioner: Rex Johnston

Area
  - Total: 36.1 sq mi (93.5 km^{2})
  - Land: 36.0 sq mi (93.3 km^{2})
  - Water: 0.077 sq mi (0.2 km^{2})
- Elevation: 1,768 ft (539 m)

Population (2020)
  - Total: 8
  - Density: 0.22/sq mi (0.086/km^{2})
- Time zone: UTC−06:00 (CST)
  - Summer (DST): UTC−05:00 (CDT)
- Area code: 785
- FIPS code: 20-36750
- GNIS feature ID: 472267
- Website: County Website

Kill Creek Township is a township in Osborne County, Kansas, United States. As of the 2020 census, the township population was 8.

== History ==
Kill Creek was named after the creek that it sits on, which was named after an Indian massacre that occurred there in the 1860s. This might be confused with the Kill Creek located in Johnson County between De Soto and Gardner.

Kill Creek Township was founded in 1872 when it was partitioned from Liberty Township. In 1880, the western half of Kill Creek Township became Mount Ayr Township. The rural farming community of Kill Creek, situated in the northern part of the township, was for a time a busy stop on the Bull City-Russell Freight Trail. An analysis of census records has shown that it suffered a steady decline in population over the years. Today, it has largely disappeared aside from a small number of residents who live in farmhouses spread throughout the township. The general store and post office are remembered only via a 1949 memorial marker where they once stood. The Kill Creek Presbyterian Church, built in 1885, was long the symbol of the community. It closed in 1985 and was torn down in 2006.

The community of Kill Creek is internationally famous as the setting for the classic American book "Sod-House Days: Letters of a Kansas Homesteader 1877–1878", which was first published in 1937 posthumously by Howard Ruede (1852–1925), who lived in the community from 1877 to 1901. Based on letters that Howard wrote from his Kill Creek homestead back to his family in Pennsylvania, the book is sold in some 24 countries around the world and is used as a textbook by over 40 colleges and universities across the United States and Canada. The book celebrated its 75th year in publication in 2012. A 31.5 mile, 27-stop self-guided auto & bicycle tour of the sites made famous in the book, The Rediscovering "Sod-House Days" Heritage Backway is now open to the public and is featured in the book "Osborne County Kansas Scenic & Heritage Backways" (2013).

== Geography ==
Kill Creek is located at 39°21′9″N 98°52′51″W (39.352483, -98.881010). According to the United States Census Bureau, the township has a total area of 36.0 square miles (93.3 km^{2}).

=== Adjacent townships ===
- Tilden Township, Osborne County (northeast)
- Independence Township, Osborne County (east)
- Covert Township, Osborne County (southeast)
- Victor Township, Osborne County (south)
- Round Mound Township, Osborne County (southwest)
- Mount Ayr Township, Osborne County (west)
- Sumner Township, Osborne County (northwest)

== Demographics ==
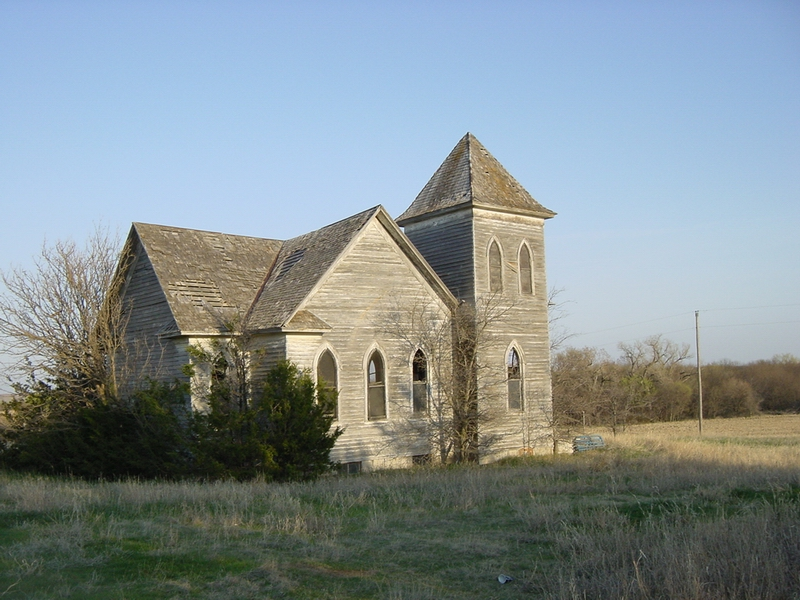
Kill Creek Presbyterian Church

Population of Kill Creek Township, Osborne Co., KS
| Year | Population | Households |
|---|---|---|
| 1878 | 431 * | |
| 1880 | 379 | 89 |
| 1900 | 307 | 56 |
| 1910 | 276 | 58 |
| 1920 | 233 | 53 |
| 1930 | 245 | 53 |
| 1990 | 54 | |
| 2000 | 35 | 20 |
| 2010 | 17 | 13 |
| 2020 | 8 | 5 |

* Includes area which would become Mount Ayr Township in 1880 (before the 1880 census).
