= Grant Township, Osborne County, Kansas =

Township in Osborne County, Kansas, U.S.

Grant Township
- Township
- Location within Osborne County
- Coordinates: 39.524764°N 98.987923°W
- Country: United States
- State: Kansas
- County: Osborne

Area
  - Total: 35.615 sq mi (92.24 km^{2})
  - Land: 35.418 sq mi (91.73 km^{2})
  - Water: 0.197 sq mi (0.51 km^{2}) 0.55%
- Elevation: 1,768 ft (539 m)

Population (2020)
  - Total: 13
  - Density: 0.37/sq mi (0.14/km^{2})
- Time zone: UTC-6 (CST)
  - Summer (DST): UTC-5 (CDT)
- Area code: 785
- GNIS feature ID: 2575214

Grant Township is a township in Osborne County, Kansas, United States. As of the 2020 census, its population was 13.

== Geography ==
Grant Township covers an area of 35.615 square miles (92.24 square kilometers).

=== Adjacent townships ===
- Dor Township, Smith County (north)
- Houston Township, Smith County (northeast)
- Hawkeye Township, Osborne County (east)
- Sumner Township, Osborne County (south)
- Township 1, Rooks County (west)
