= Lawrence Township, Osborne County, Kansas =

Township in Osborne County, Kansas, U.S.

Lawrence Township
- Township
- Location within Osborne County
- Coordinates: 39.532573°N 98.765026°W
- Country: United States
- State: Kansas
- County: Osborne

Government
  - First District Commissioner: Craig Pottberg

Area
  - Total: 34.717 sq mi (89.92 km^{2})
  - Land: 34.587 sq mi (89.58 km^{2})
  - Water: 0.13 sq mi (0.34 km^{2}) 0.37%
- Elevation: 1,680 ft (510 m)

Population (2020)
  - Total: 30
  - Density: 0.87/sq mi (0.33/km^{2})
- Time zone: UTC-6 (CST)
  - Summer (DST): UTC-5 (CDT)
- Area code: 785
- GNIS feature ID: 472277

Lawrence Township is a township in Osborne County, Kansas, United States. As of the 2020 census, its population was 30.

== Geography ==
Lawrence Township covers an area of 34.717 square miles (89.92 square kilometers). The North Fork Solomon River flows through it.

=== Adjacent townships ===
- Harlan Township, Smith County (north)
- Garfield Township, Smith County (northeast)
- Bethany Township, Osborne County (east)
- Penn Township, Osborne County (southeast)
- Tilden Township, Osborne County (south)
- Hawkeye Township, Osborne County (west)
