= Codell, Kansas =

Unincorporated community in Rooks County, Kansas

- CDP
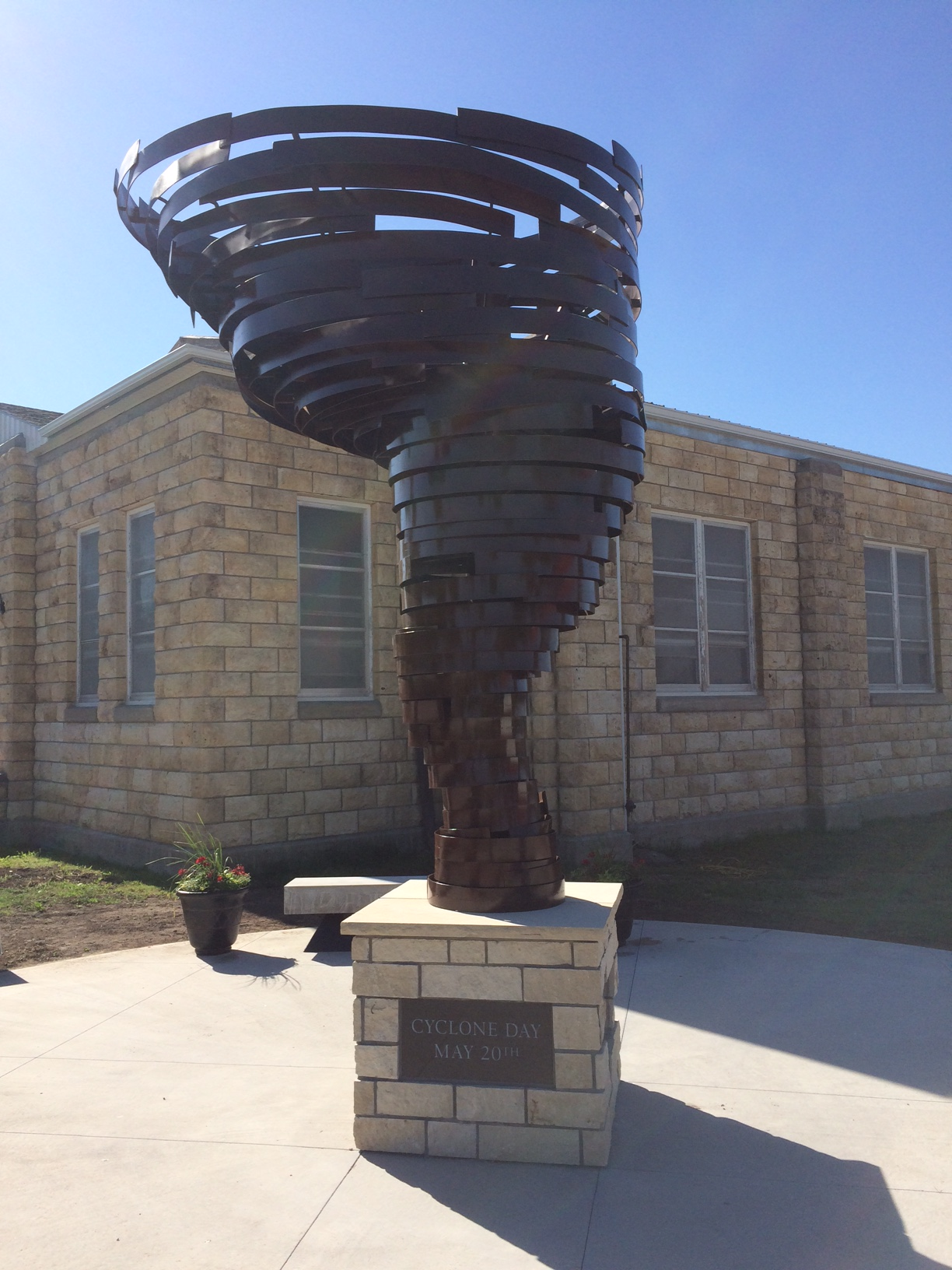
- Codell Kansas Cyclone Day Memorial (2018)

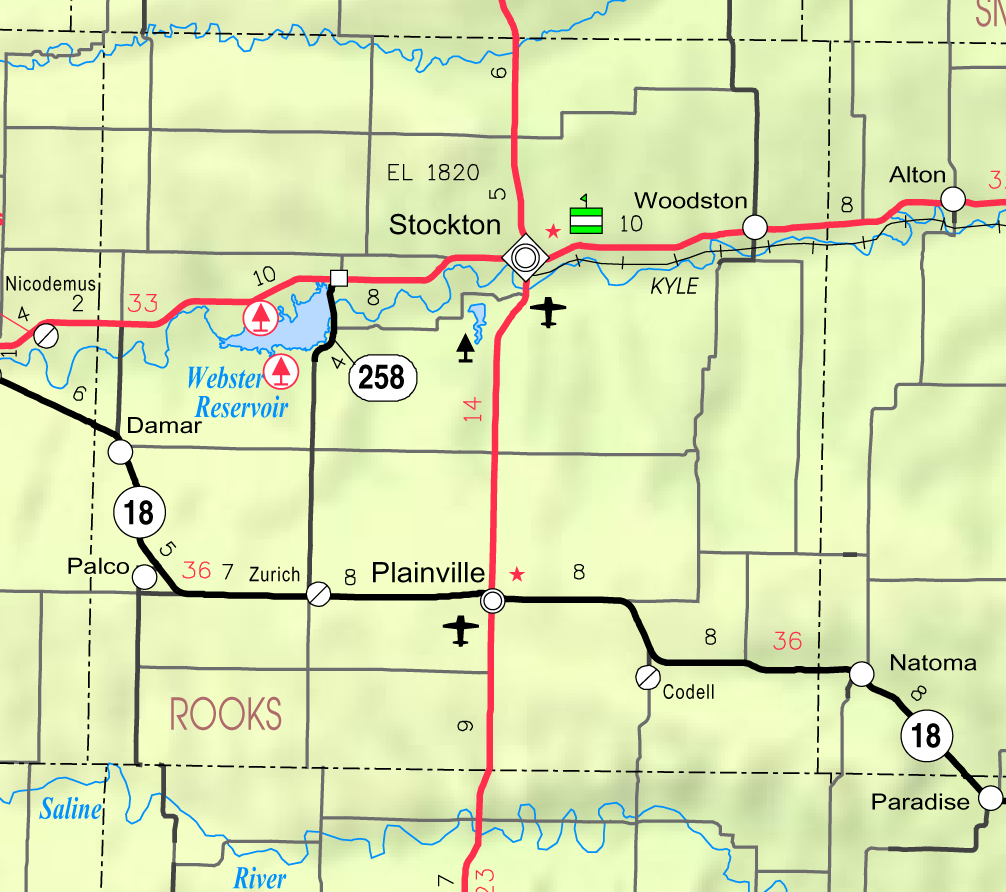
- KDOT map of Rooks County (legend)
- Coordinates: 39°11′43″N 99°10′12″W
- Country: United States
- State: Kansas
- County: Rooks
- Township: Township 12
- Founded: 1887
- Elevation: 2,011 ft (613 m)

Population (2020)
  - Total: 49
- Time zone: UTC-6 (CST)
  - Summer (DST): UTC-5 (CDT)
- ZIP Code: 67663
- Area code: 785
- FIPS code: 20-14575
- GNIS ID: 2804531

Codell is a census-designated place (CDP) in Rooks County, Kansas, United States. As of the 2020 census, the population was 49.

== History ==
Codell was established as a Union Pacific Railroad depot in 1887. Union Pacific could not reach agreement with the town of Motor, so Union Pacific established the community of Codell three-quarters of a mile west of Motor. The Motor Post Office, originally established as Floreyville in 1875, was moved to Codell in 1888. The frame buildings in Motor were moved to Codell and Motor was soon abandoned.

Early in its history Codell had a school, multiple churches and a business district with a bank, telephone central office, lumber yard, grain elevator, several stores, a doctor and a barber.

=== Tornadoes ===
Codell is notable for its tornado history which earned it a mention in Ripley's Believe It or Not!. The community was hit by tornadoes on May 20 in three consecutive years: 1916, 1917 and 1918.

The 1916 tornado, estimated at F2 intensity, passed east of Codell in the early evening. The 1917 tornado reached F3 intensity and passed west of Codell, also in the early evening. In 1918, Codell took a direct hit from an F4 tornado just after dark. The school, M. E. church, hotel and several residences were completely destroyed. Many more buildings were badly damaged. Although the school was rebuilt and a new high school was built in 1938, the town never fully recovered from the devastation of the 1918 tornado.

== Geography ==
Codell lies in Township 12 south of the city of Stockton (the county seat of Rooks County) and near the southeastern corner of Rooks County. The community lies along the banks of Paradise Creek and an abandoned railroad line. The nearest city, Plainville, lies approximately 9 miles (14 km) away to the northwest by road; the community is connected via 24 Road to a state highway, K-18, which lies approximately 1 mile (1.6 km) to the north.

== Demographics ==
Historical population
Census	Pop.	Note	%±
2020	49		—
U.S. Decennial Census

The 2020 United States census counted 49 people, 16 households, and 11 families in Codell. The population density was 65.2 per square mile (25.2/km^{2}). There were 23 housing units at an average density of 30.6 per square mile (11.8/km^{2}). The racial makeup was 95.92% (47) white or European American (95.92% non-Hispanic white), 0.0% (0) black or African-American, 0.0% (0) Native American or Alaska Native, 0.0% (0) Asian, 0.0% (0) Pacific Islander or Native Hawaiian, 0.0% (0) from other races, and 4.08% (2) from two or more races. Hispanic or Latino of any race was 0.0% (0) of the population.

Of the 16 households, 18.8% had children under the age of 18; 56.2% were married couples living together; 25.0% had a female householder with no spouse or partner present. 31.2% of households consisted of individuals and 18.8% had someone living alone who was 65 years of age or older. The average household size was 2.2 and the average family size was 2.2. The percent of those with a bachelor's degree or higher was estimated to be 53.1% of the population.

16.3% of the population was under the age of 18, 14.3% from 18 to 24, 16.3% from 25 to 44, 40.8% from 45 to 64, and 12.2% who were 65 years of age or older. The median age was 49.2 years. For every 100 females, there were 104.2 males. For every 100 females ages 18 and older, there were 105.0 males.

The 2016–2020 5-year American Community Survey estimates show that the median household income was $73,512 (with a margin of error of +/- $5,277) and the median family income was $73,512 (+/- $5,277). Males had a median income of $41,071 (+/- $9,669). The median income for those above 16 years old was $40,536 (+/- $2,397).

== Education ==
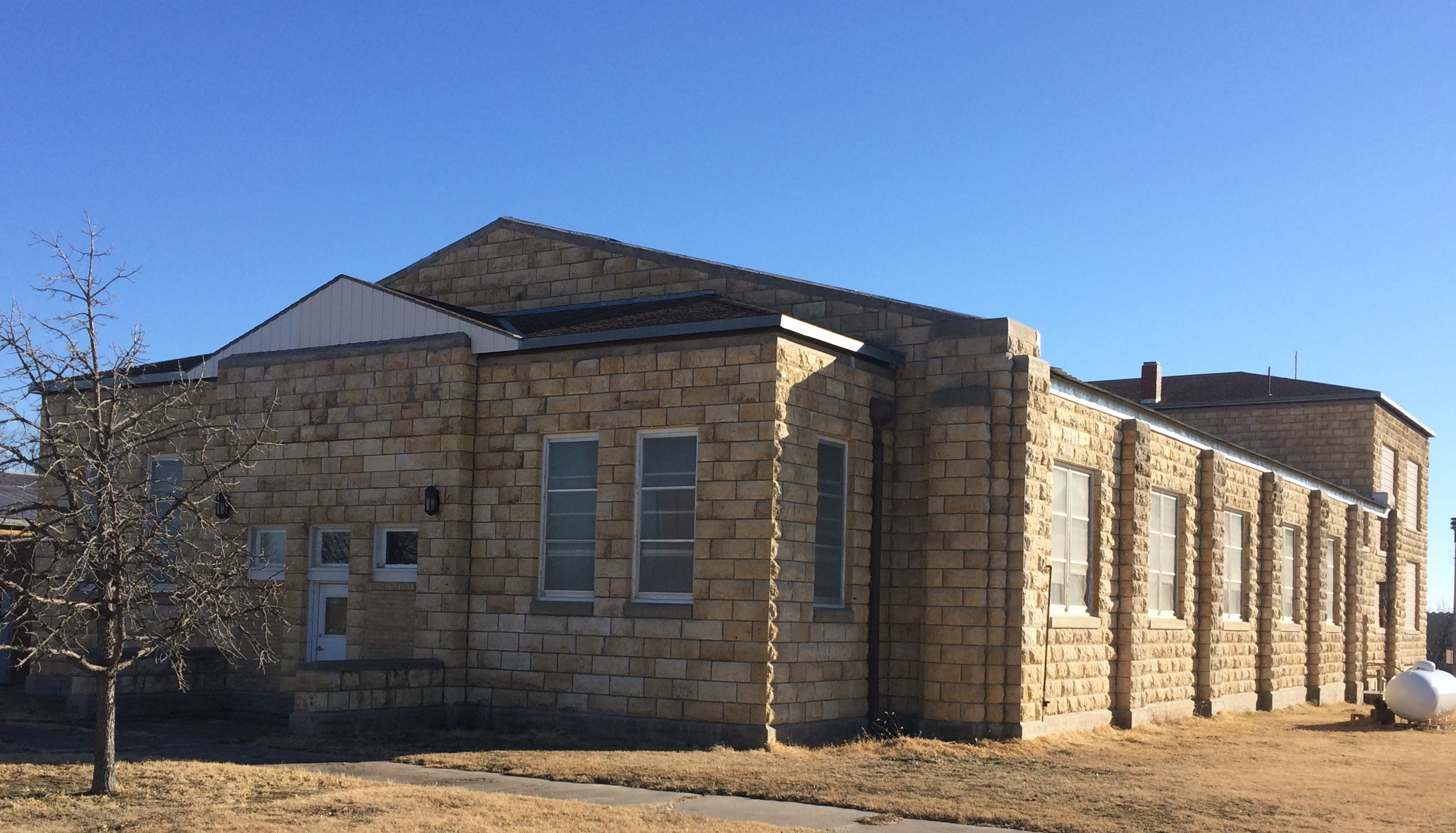
Codell High School (est 1938)

Codell is served by USD 270 Plainville Schools.

Codell High School was closed through school unification in 1965. The Codell High School mascot was Codell Cougars.

== Arts and culture ==
=== Points of Interest ===
- Cyclone Day Memorial constructed in 2018 and dedicated on the 100th anniversary of the last May 20 cyclone.
- Historic limestone school and Cougar Gymnasium constructed in 1938 as a WPA project.
- Church building constructed in 1908. The building withstood the tornadoes of 1916, 1917 and 1918.
- King Hill located four miles south of Codell on Codell Road. The view of the Saline Valley from King Hill was used in the closing scene of the movie Paper Moon. The Romine house, that was located in the Saline Valley, was the setting of Aunt Billie's home in the movie. The Paper Moon fight scene with Moses Pray (Ryan O'Neal) and Leroy (Randy Quaid) was set at the Clair farm also in the Saline Valley near Codell.

== See also ==
- Tornado records
- Codell Sandstone
