= Hancock Township, Kansas =

Township in Osborne County, Kansas, U.S.

Hancock Township
- Township
- Location within Osborne County
- Coordinates: 39.359051°N 98.654681°W
- Country: United States
- State: Kansas
- County: Osborne

Area
  - Total: 36.022 sq mi (93.30 km^{2})
  - Land: 35.936 sq mi (93.07 km^{2})
  - Water: 0.086 sq mi (0.22 km^{2}) 0.24%
- Elevation: 1,660 ft (510 m)

Population (2020)
  - Total: 16
  - Density: 0.45/sq mi (0.17/km^{2})
- Time zone: UTC-6 (CST)
  - Summer (DST): UTC-5 (CDT)
- Area code: 785
- GNIS feature ID: 472279

Hancock Township is a township in Osborne County, Kansas, United States. As of the 2020 census, its population was 16.

== Geography ==
Hancock Township covers an area of 36.022 square miles (93.30 square kilometers).

=== Adjacent townships ===
- Penn Township, Osborne County (north)
- Corinth Township, Osborne County (northeast)
- Bloom Township, Osborne County (east)
- Winfield Township, Osborne County (south)
- Covert Township, Osborne County (southwest)
- Independence Township, Osborne County (west)

== Transportation ==
=== Major highways ===
- US-281
