= Dor Township, Kansas =

Township in Smith County, Kansas, U.S.

Dor Township
- Township
- Location within Smith County
- Coordinates: 39.597254°N 99.006848°W
- Country: United States
- State: Kansas
- County: Smith

Government
  - Trustee: Tim Riley

Area
  - Total: 35.926 sq mi (93.05 km^{2})
  - Land: 35.812 sq mi (92.75 km^{2})
  - Water: 0.114 sq mi (0.30 km^{2}) 0.32%

Population (2020)
  - Total: 49
  - Density: 1.4/sq mi (0.53/km^{2})
- Time zone: UTC-6 (CST)
  - Summer (DST): UTC-5 (CDT)
- Area code: 785
- GNIS feature ID: 472058

Dor Township is a township in Smith County, Kansas, United States. As of the 2020 census, its population was 49.

== History ==
Dor Township was created from part of Harvey Township.

== Geography ==
Dor Township covers an area of 35.926 square miles (93.07 square kilometers). The North Fork Solomon River flows through it, as well as Medicine Creek and Glen Rock Creek.

=== Adjacent townships ===
Valley Township, Smith County
Kirwin Township, Phillips County	northwest	north	northeast	Harvey Township, Smith County
Valley Township, Phillips County	west	self	east	Houston Township, Smith County
Township 1, Rooks County	southwest	south
Grant Township, Osborne County

== Demographics ==
As of the 2020 census, there were 49 people and 35 households residing in the township. The population density was 1.4 people per square mile (0.54 people/km^{2}). There were 43 housing units. The racial makeup of the township was 95.9% White and 4.1% from two or more races. Hispanics or Latinos of any race were 0.0% of the population.

There were 35 households: 11.4% were married couples living together and 88.6% had a male householder with no spouse present. The average family size was 2.17 people. 42.8% of people in the township older than 24 had a college degree, and the township had an employment rate of 42.9%.
