= Independence Township, Osborne County, Kansas =

Township in Osborne County, Kansas, U.S.

Independence Township
- Township
- Location within Osborne County
- Coordinates: 39.348261°N 98.767942°W
- Country: United States
- State: Kansas
- County: Osborne

Area
  - Total: 35.54 sq mi (92.0 km^{2})
  - Land: 35.454 sq mi (91.83 km^{2})
  - Water: 0.086 sq mi (0.22 km^{2}) 0.24%
- Elevation: 1,729 ft (527 m)

Population (2020)
  - Total: 24
  - Density: 0.68/sq mi (0.26/km^{2})
- Time zone: UTC-6 (CST)
  - Summer (DST): UTC-5 (CDT)
- Area code: 785
- GNIS feature ID: 472278

Independence Township is a township in Osborne County, Kansas, United States. As of the 2020 census, its population was 24.

== Geography ==
Independence Township covers an area of 35.54 square miles (92.0 square kilometers).

=== Adjacent townships ===
- Penn Township, Osborne County (northeast)
- Hancock Township, Osborne County (east)
- Winfield Township, Osborne County (southeast)
- Covert Township, Osborne County (south)
- Victor Township, Osborne County (southwest)
- Kill Creek Township, Osborne County (west)
- Tilden Township, Osborne County (northwest)
