= Hawkeye Township, Kansas =

Township in Osborne County, Kansas, U.S.

Hawkeye Township
- Township
- Location within Osborne County
- Coordinates: 39.519106°N 98.875091°W
- Country: United States
- State: Kansas
- County: Osborne

Area
  - Total: 35.745 sq mi (92.58 km^{2})
  - Land: 35.579 sq mi (92.15 km^{2})
  - Water: 0.166 sq mi (0.43 km^{2}) 0.46%
- Elevation: 1,798 ft (548 m)

Population (2020)
  - Total: 27
  - Density: 0.76/sq mi (0.29/km^{2})
- Time zone: UTC-6 (CST)
  - Summer (DST): UTC-5 (CDT)
- Area code: 785
- GNIS feature ID: 472265

Hawkeye Township is a township in Osborne County, Kansas, United States. As of the 2020 census, its population was 27.

== History ==
In 1881, the Little Zion Church Primitive Baptist Church was founded, and was headquartered in Hawkeye township and nearby Gaylord. The church never had more than 18 members and dissolved with a vote in 1907.

== Geography ==
Hawkeye Township covers an area of 35.745 square miles (92.58 square kilometers).

=== Adjacent townships ===
- Houston Township, Smith County (north)
- Harlan Township, Smith County (northeast)
- Lawrence Township, Osborne County (east)
- Tilden Township, Osborne County (southeast)
- Sumner Township, Osborne County (southwest)
- Grant Township, Osborne County (west)
