= Township 12, Rooks County, Kansas =

Township in Rooks County, Kansas, U.S.

Township 12
- Township
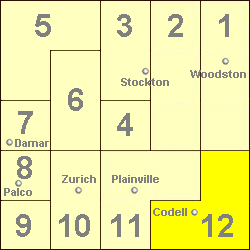
- Location in Rooks County

- Location within state of Kansas
- Coordinates: 39°12′20″N 99°08′25″W
- Country: United States
- State: Kansas
- County: Rooks
- Established: 1971

Area
  - Total: 106.961 sq mi (277.03 km^{2})
  - Land: 106.701 sq mi (276.35 km^{2})
  - Water: 0.26 sq mi (0.67 km^{2}) 0.24%
- Elevation: 1,991 ft (607 m)

Population (2020)
  - Total: 142
  - Density: 1.33/sq mi (0.514/km^{2})
- Time zone: UTC-6 (CST)
  - Summer (DST): UTC-5 (CDT)
- Area code: 785
- GNIS feature ID: 472385

Township 12 is a township in Rooks County, Kansas, United States. As of the 2020 census, its population was 142. Codell is the largest population center in Township 12.

== History ==
Rooks County was established with four townships: Bow Creek, Lowell, Paradise and Stockton. That number increased to seven by 1878 and twenty three in 1925. The twenty three townships were in place until 1971 when the number was reduced to the current twelve townships.

Township 12 was formed from Rooks County townships Corning and Paradise in 1971 pursuant to Kansas Statute 80-1110. 80-1110 allowed for the disorganization of townships and assigning those territories to contiguous townships.

=== Corning Township ===
Corning Township was established from part of Paradise Township around 1884.

=== Paradise Township ===
Paradise was one of the four original Rooks County civil townships along with Bow Creek, Lowell and Stockton. The original Paradise Township was 12 miles north-to-south (two survey townships). The east border was the Osborne County line. The western border is the Graham County line, making Paradise 30 miles (five survey townships) wide.

Corning, Fairview, Logan, Northampton, Plainville, Twin Mound and Walton townships were all formed from Paradise Township. Paradise was a double township until Township 12 was created.

== Geography ==
Township 12 covers an area of 106.961 square miles (277.03 square kilometers). Paradise Creek, labeled as Salt Creek on early maps, runs across Township 12 before flowing into the Saline River in Russell County.

=== Communities ===
- Codell

=== Adjacent townships ===
Township 1, Rooks County
Township 2, Rooks County	northwest	north	northeast	Mount Ayr Township, Osborne County
Township 11, Rooks County	west	self	east	Round Mound Township, Osborne County; Natoma Township, Osborne County
		south	southeast	Herzog Township, Ellis County
Buckeye Township, Ellis County

== Transportation ==
=== Major highways ===
- K-18
