= Natoma, Kansas =

City in Osborne County, Kansas

- City
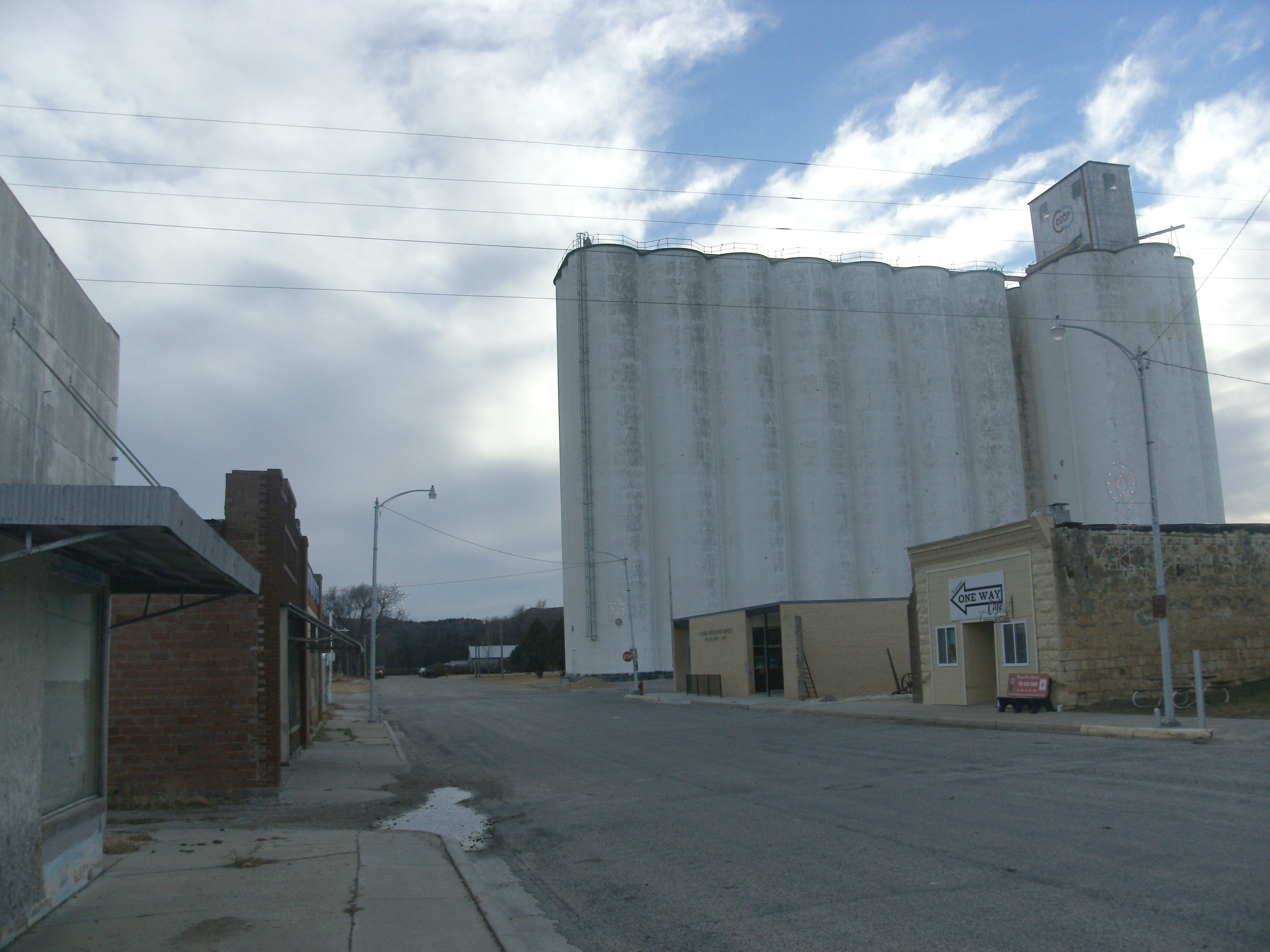
- Facing southwest, as the tracks and the streets were perpendicular to the tracks (2014)

- Location within Osborne County and Kansas

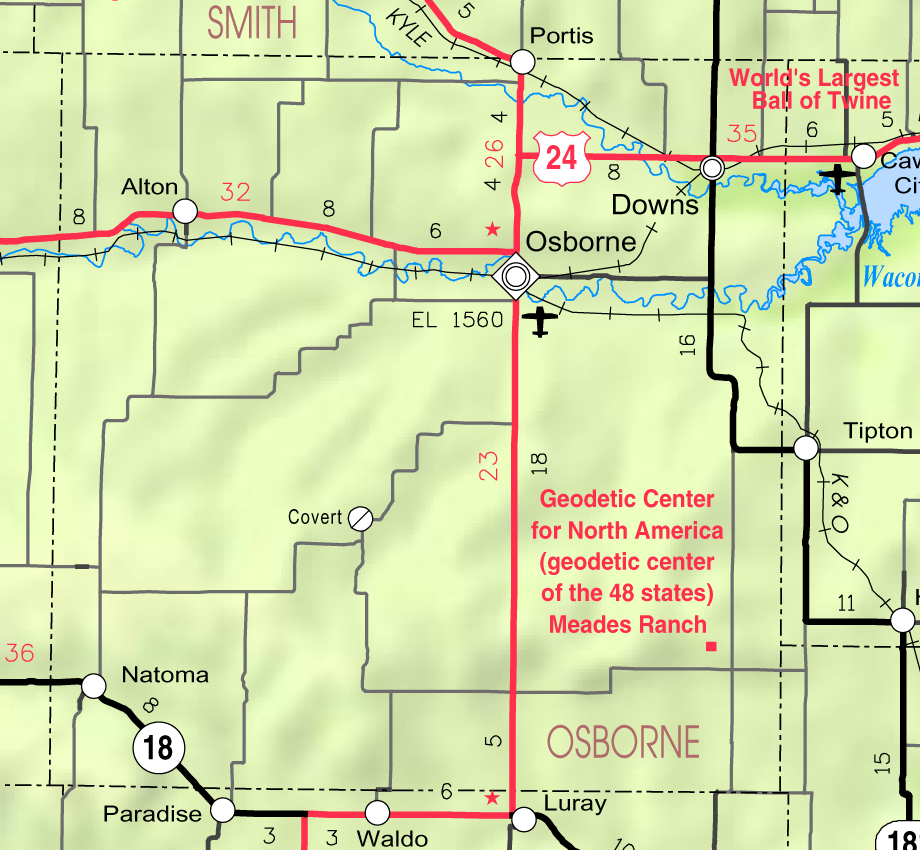
- KDOT map of Osborne County (legend)
- Coordinates: 39°11′19″N 99°01′27″W
- Country: United States
- State: Kansas
- County: Osborne
- Founded: 1888
- Incorporated: 1905

Area
  - Total: 0.42 sq mi (1.09 km^{2})
  - Land: 0.42 sq mi (1.09 km^{2})
  - Water: 0 sq mi (0.00 km^{2})
- Elevation: 1,831 ft (558 m)

Population (2020)
  - Total: 302
  - Density: 718/sq mi (277/km^{2})
- Time zone: UTC-6 (CST)
  - Summer (DST): UTC-5 (CDT)
- ZIP Code: 67651
- Area code: 785
- FIPS code: 20-49425
- GNIS ID: 2395159
- Website: cityofnatoma.com

Natoma is a city in Osborne County, Kansas, United States. As of the 2020 census, the population of the city was 302.

== History ==
Natoma was established in 1888, named after an American Indian railroad employee by a railroad officer. The name means "new born". The first post office had opened under the name Tapley in December 1878, but the name was changed to Natoma in July 1890. Natoma was incorporated as a city in 1905.

== Geography ==
Natoma lies in the Smoky Hills region of the Great Plains, approximately 9 miles (14 km) north of the Saline River. Paradise Creek, a tributary of the Saline, flows southeast along the southern edge of the city. Natoma is in north-central Kansas approximately 135 miles (217 km) northwest of Wichita and 230 miles (370 km) west of Kansas City. Located on K-18, it is roughly 25 miles (40 km) southwest of Osborne, the county seat.

According to the United States Census Bureau, the city has a total area of 0.41 square miles (1.06 km^{2}), all land.

== Demographics ==
Historical population
Census	Pop.	Note	%±
1910	407		—
1920	518		27.3%
1930	583		12.5%
1940	651		11.7%
1950	775		19.0%
1960	775		0.0%
1970	603		−22.2%
1980	515		−14.6%
1990	392		−23.9%
2000	367		−6.4%
2010	335		−8.7%
2020	302		−9.9%
U.S. Decennial Census

=== 2020 census ===
The 2020 United States census counted 302 people, 126 households, and 81 families in Natoma. The population density was 715.6 per square mile (276.3/km^{2}). There were 209 housing units at an average density of 495.3 per square mile (191.2/km^{2}). The racial makeup was 93.05% (281) white or European American (93.05% non-Hispanic white), 0.0% (0) black or African-American, 0.0% (0) Native American or Alaska Native, 0.66% (2) Asian, 0.0% (0) Pacific Islander or Native Hawaiian, 0.0% (0) from other races, and 6.29% (19) from two or more races. Hispanic or Latino of any race was 0.66% (2) of the population.

Of the 126 households, 27.8% had children under the age of 18; 47.6% were married couples living together; 25.4% had a female householder with no spouse or partner present. 31.0% of households consisted of individuals and 11.9% had someone living alone who was 65 years of age or older. The average household size was 2.5 and the average family size was 2.9. The percent of those with a bachelor's degree or higher was estimated to be 16.9% of the population.

23.8% of the population was under the age of 18, 4.3% from 18 to 24, 21.5% from 25 to 44, 28.5% from 45 to 64, and 21.9% who were 65 years of age or older. The median age was 47.0 years. For every 100 females, there were 91.1 males. For every 100 females ages 18 and older, there were 96.6 males.

The 2016–2020 5-year American Community Survey estimates show that the median household income was $64,375 (with a margin of error of +/- $20,270) and the median family income was $62,039 (+/- $11,516). Males had a median income of $41,369 (+/- $1,536) versus $24,167 (+/- $9,242) for females. The median income for those above 16 years old was $36,406 (+/- $8,683). Approximately, 0.0% of families and 2.8% of the population were below the poverty line, including 0.0% of those under the age of 18 and 8.5% of those ages 65 or over.

=== 2010 census ===
As of the 2010 census, there were 335 people, 160 households and 86 families residing in the city. The population density was 817.1 per square mile (315.5/km^{2}). There were 229 housing units at an average density of 558.5 per square mile (215.6/km^{2}). The racial makeup was 97.0% White, 0.9% African American, 1.2% Asian, and 0.9% from two or more races. Hispanic or Latino of any race were 2.1% of the population.

There were 160 households, of which 25.6% had children under the age of 18 living with them, 40.0% were married couples living together, 8.8% had a female householder with no husband present, 5.0% had a male householder with no wife present, and 46.3% were non-families. 43.1% of all households were made up of individuals, and 18.8% had someone living alone who was 65 years of age or older. The average household size was 2.09 and the average family size was 2.86.

The median age was 43.5 years. 23.3% of residents were under the age of 18; 6.1% were between the ages of 18 and 24; 23.1% were from 25 to 44; 21.9% were from 45 to 64; and 26% were 65 years of age or older. The gender make-up was 54.9% male and 45.1% female.

== Culture ==
=== Events ===
The city holds a Labor Day celebration which as its annual community festival which includes a parade, barbecue and other entertainment.

=== Points of interest ===
Natoma Presbyterian Church, constructed in 1899, is listed in the National Register of Historic Places for its architecture.

== Education ==
The community is served by Natoma–Paradise–Waldo USD 399 public school district, which is located in Natoma and has two schools in the city:

- Natoma Elementary School (Grades K-6)
- Natoma High School (7-12)

The Natoma Tigers have won the following Kansas State High School championships:

- 1958 Boys' basketball - Class B
- 1959 Boys' basketball - Class B
- 1974 Boys' cross country - Class 1A
- 1975 Boys' basketball - Class 1A
- 1982 Girls' basketball - Class 1A
- 2014 Boys' cross country - Class 1A
- 2015 Boys' cross country - Class 1A

== Transportation ==
K-18, an east–west route, approaches Natoma from the west, then turns southeast along the eastern side of the city.
