= Woodston, Kansas =

City in Rooks County, Kansas, United States

- City
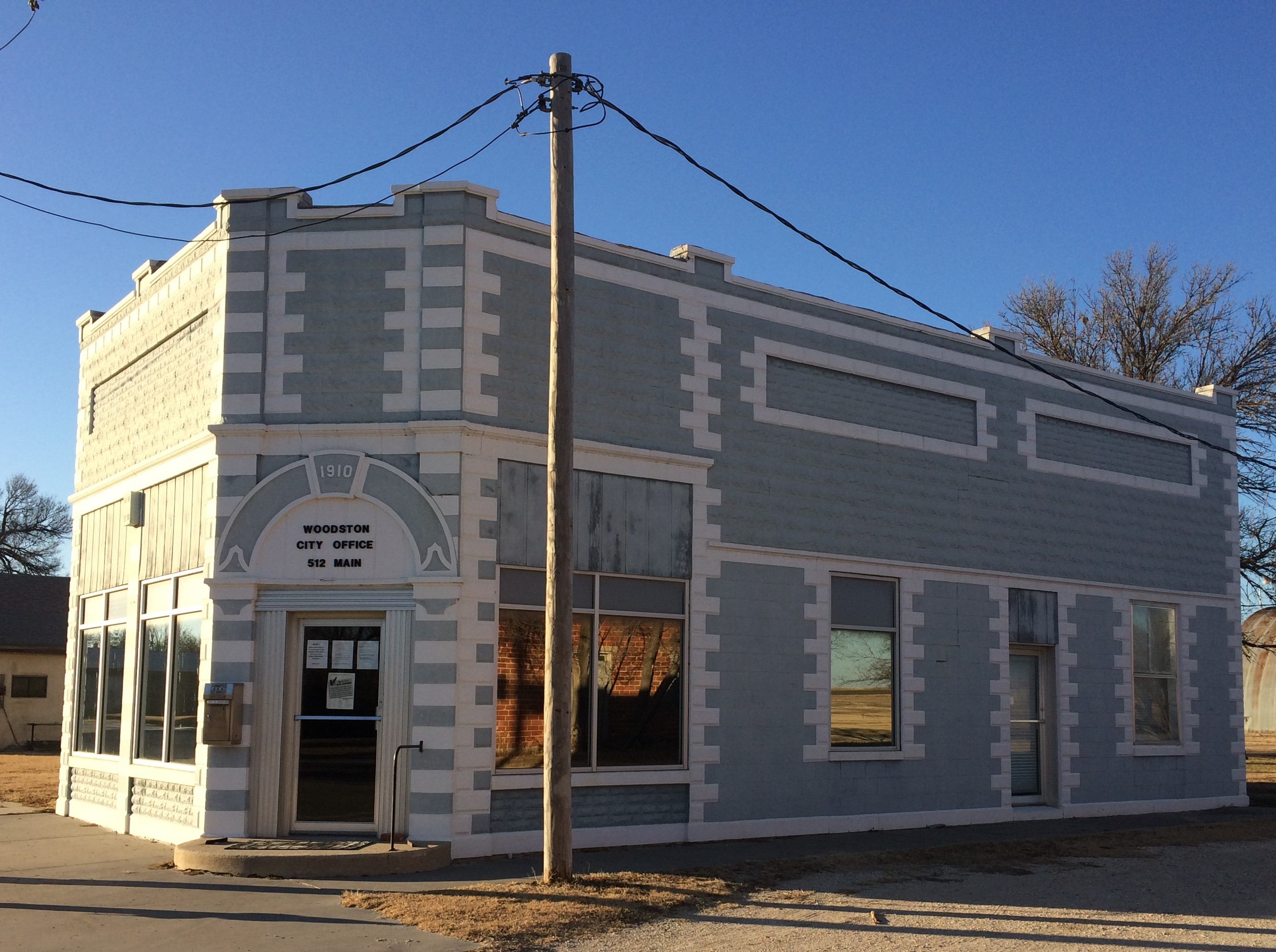
- Woodston City Office est 1910 (2016)

- Location within Rooks County and Kansas

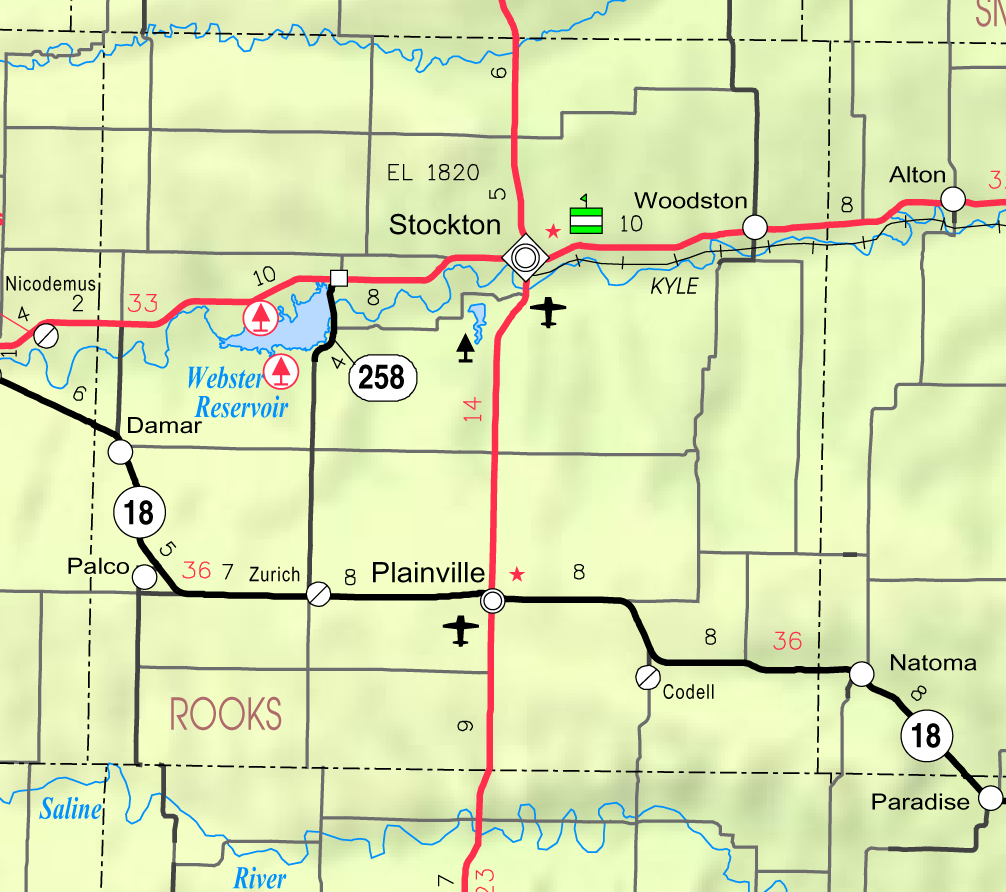
- KDOT map of Rooks County (legend)
- Coordinates: 39°27′14″N 99°05′54″W
- Country: United States
- State: Kansas
- County: Rooks
- Founded: 1885
- Incorporated: 1905
- Named for: Charles Woods

Area
  - Total: 0.21 sq mi (0.55 km^{2})
  - Land: 0.21 sq mi (0.55 km^{2})
  - Water: 0 sq mi (0.00 km^{2})
- Elevation: 1,709 ft (521 m)

Population (2020)
  - Total: 94
  - Density: 440/sq mi (170/km^{2})
- Time zone: UTC-6 (CST)
  - Summer (DST): UTC-5 (CDT)
- ZIP Code: 67675
- Area code: 785
- FIPS code: 20-80450
- GNIS ID: 2397374

Woodston is a city in Rooks County, Kansas, United States. As of the 2020 census, the population of the city was 94.

== History ==
Woodston was established along the Missouri Pacific Railroad in 1885 as a railroad town between Bull City (Alton) and Stockton. Woodston was named for Stockton businessman Charles C. Woods, who was instrumental in getting railroad service to Stockton.

The Rooks Centre Post Office, established in 1872, was moved to Woodston in 1886.

Woodston filed for incorporation in 1905.

== Geography ==
According to the United States Census Bureau, the city has a total area of 0.24 square miles (0.62 km^{2}), all land.

== Demographics ==
Historical population
Census	Pop.	Note	%±
1910	299		—
1920	314		5.0%
1930	287		−8.6%
1940	286		−0.3%
1950	296		3.5%
1960	332		12.2%
1970	211		−36.4%
1980	157		−25.6%
1990	121		−22.9%
2000	116		−4.1%
2010	136		17.2%
2020	94		−30.9%
U.S. Decennial Census

=== 2010 census ===
As of the census of 2010, there were 136 people, 53 households, and 38 families living in the city. The population density was 566.7 inhabitants per square mile (218.8/km^{2}). There were 82 housing units at an average density of 341.7 per square mile (131.9/km^{2}). The racial makeup of the city was 94.9% White, 1.5% African American, 2.9% Asian, and 0.7% from two or more races. Hispanic or Latino of any race were 0.7% of the population.

There were 53 households, of which 34.0% had children under the age of 18 living with them, 50.9% were married couples living together, 11.3% had a female householder with no husband present, 9.4% had a male householder with no wife present, and 28.3% were non-families. 24.5% of all households were made up of individuals, and 9.5% had someone living alone who was 65 years of age or older. The average household size was 2.57 and the average family size was 2.92.

The median age in the city was 34.5 years. 26.5% of residents were under the age of 18; 11% were between the ages of 18 and 24; 20.6% were from 25 to 44; 24.3% were from 45 to 64; and 17.6% were 65 years of age or older. The gender makeup of the city was 54.4% male and 45.6% female.

=== 2000 census ===
As of the census of 2000, there were 116 people, 63 households, and 22 families living in the city. The population density was 489.7 inhabitants per square mile (189.1/km^{2}). There were 87 housing units at an average density of 367.3 per square mile (141.8/km^{2}). The racial makeup of the city was 98.28% White and 1.72% Native American. Hispanic or Latino of any race were 0.86% of the population.

There were 63 households, out of which 17.5% had children under the age of 18 living with them, 31.7% were married couples living together, 3.2% had a female householder with no husband present, and 63.5% were non-families. 57.1% of all households were made up of individuals, and 31.7% had someone living alone who was 65 years of age or older. The average household size was 1.84 and the average family size was 3.09.

In the city, the population was spread out, with 23.3% under the age of 18, 2.6% from 18 to 24, 24.1% from 25 to 44, 21.6% from 45 to 64, and 28.4% who were 65 years of age or older. The median age was 45 years. For every 100 females, there were 107.1 males. For every 100 females age 18 and over, there were 107.0 males.

The median income for a household in the city was $20,357, and the median income for a family was $25,625. Males had a median income of $23,438 versus $13,750 for females. The per capita income for the city was $10,592. There were 11.1% of families and 23.5% of the population living below the poverty line, including 28.6% of under eighteens and none of those over 64.

== Education ==
Woodston is part of Unified School District 271. The district doesn't have any schools in Woodston.

Woodston High School closed in 1968. The grade school closed in 1974. The Woodston High School mascot was Woodston Coyotes.
