= Franklin Township, Ness County, Kansas =

Township in Ness County, Kansas, U.S.

Franklin Township
- Township
- Location within Ness County
- Coordinates: 38.33406°N 99.916221°W
- Country: United States
- State: Kansas
- County: Ness

Area
  - Total: 143.598 sq mi (371.92 km^{2})
  - Land: 143.571 sq mi (371.85 km^{2})
  - Water: 0.027 sq mi (0.070 km^{2}) 0.02%

Population (2020)
  - Total: 100
  - Density: 0.70/sq mi (0.27/km^{2})
- Time zone: UTC-6 (CST)
  - Summer (DST): UTC-5 (CDT)
- Area code: 785

Franklin Township is a township in Ness County, Kansas, United States. As of the 2020 census, its population was 100.

== Geography ==
Franklin Township covers an area of 143.598 square miles (371.92 square kilometers).

=== Adjacent townships ===
- Center Township, Ness County (north-northeast)
- Bazine Township, Ness County (northeast)
- Highpoint Township, Ness County (east)
- Valley Township, Hodgeman County (south)
- North Roscoe Township, Hodgeman County (southwest)
- Johnson Township, Ness County (west)
- Eden Township, Ness County (northwest)
- Forrester Township, Ness County (north-northwest)

=== Major highways ===
- US-283
