= Highpoint Township, Kansas =

Township in Ness County, Kansas, U.S.

Highpoint Township
- Township
- Location within Ness County
- Coordinates: 38.330081°N 99.693494°W
- Country: United States
- State: Kansas
- County: Ness

Area
  - Total: 120.681 sq mi (312.56 km^{2})
  - Land: 120.589 sq mi (312.32 km^{2})
  - Water: 0.092 sq mi (0.24 km^{2}) 0.08%

Population (2020)
  - Total: 52
  - Density: 0.43/sq mi (0.17/km^{2})
- Time zone: UTC-6 (CST)
  - Summer (DST): UTC-5 (CDT)
- Area code: 785

Highpoint Township is a township in Ness County, Kansas, United States. As of the 2020 census, its population was 52.

== Geography ==
Highpoint Township covers an area of 120.681 square miles (312.56 square kilometers).

=== Adjacent townships ===
- Bazine Township, Ness County (north)
- Alexander-Belle Prairie Township, Rush County (northeast)
- Shiley Township, Pawnee County (east)
- Marena Township, Hodgeman County (south)
- Valley Township, Hodgeman County (southwest)
- Franklin Township, Ness County (west)
