= 2016 United States presidential election in Kansas =

- November 8, 2016
- Turnout: 59.70% ▲

| Nominee | Donald Trump | Hillary Clinton |
| Party | Republican | Democratic |
| Home state | New York | New York |
| Running mate | Mike Pence | Tim Kaine |
| Electoral vote | 6 | 0 |
| Popular vote | 671,018 | 427,005 |
| Percentage | 56.65% | 36.05% |

Trump
40–50%
50–60%
60–70%
70–80%
80–90%
90–100%
Clinton
40–50%
50–60%
60–70%
70–80%
80–90%
90–100%
Tie/No Data
President before election
Barack Obama
Democratic
Elected President
Donald Trump
Republican

Treemap of the popular vote by county

The 2016 United States presidential election in Kansas was held on Tuesday, November 8, 2016, as part of the 2016 United States presidential election in which all 50 states and the District of Columbia participated. Kansas voters chose electors to represent them in the Electoral College via a popular vote, pitting the Republican Party's nominee, businessman Donald Trump, and running mate Indiana Governor Mike Pence against Democratic Party nominee, former Secretary of State Hillary Clinton, and her running mate Virginia Senator Tim Kaine. Kansas has six electoral votes in the Electoral College.

Trump carried the state with 56.65 percent of the vote, while Clinton received 36.05 percent. Kansas was among eleven states (and the District of Columbia) in which Clinton improved on Barack Obama's margin from 2012 (though her vote share was lower than Obama's 38 percent), largely due to a significant shift towards Democrats in Johnson County.

This was the final election of Johnson County's 104-year streak of voting Republican, as in the next election Joe Biden would become the first Democratic presidential nominee to win the county since 1916.

This is the most recent election as of the 2024 election where Johnson County, Riley County, or Shawnee County has voted Republican. This is also the last time the Democratic nominee won less than 40% of the vote in Kansas.

== Caucuses ==
=== Democratic caucuses ===
Results of the Democratic caucuses by Congressional District Bernie Sanders

Kansas Democratic caucuses, March 5, 2016
| Candidate | District delegates | | Estimated delegates | | |
| Candidate | Count | Percentage | Pledged | Unpledged | Total |
|---|---|---|---|---|---|
| Bernie Sanders | 26,637 | 67.90% | 23 | 0 | 23 |
| Hillary Clinton | 12,593 | 32.10% | 10 | 4 | 14 |
| Uncommitted | —N/a | | 0 | 0 | 0 |
| Total | 39,230 | 100% | 33 | 4 | 37 |

Bernie Sanders visited Kansas during the primary season, while Hillary Clinton did not herself and instead sent her daughter Chelsea Clinton to hold a rally in Johnson County.

=== Republican caucuses ===
2016 Kansas Republican presidential caucuses
- March 5, 2016
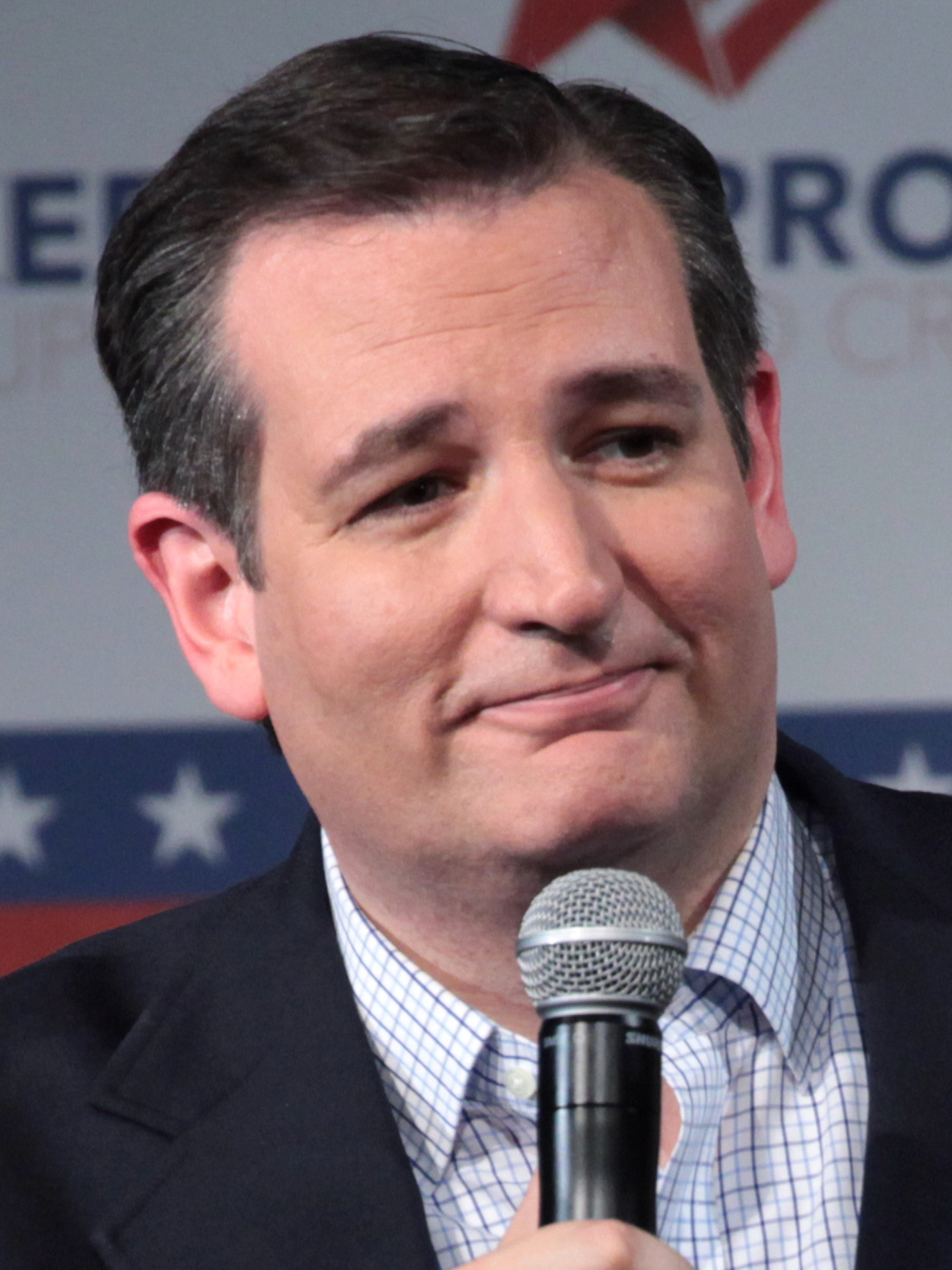

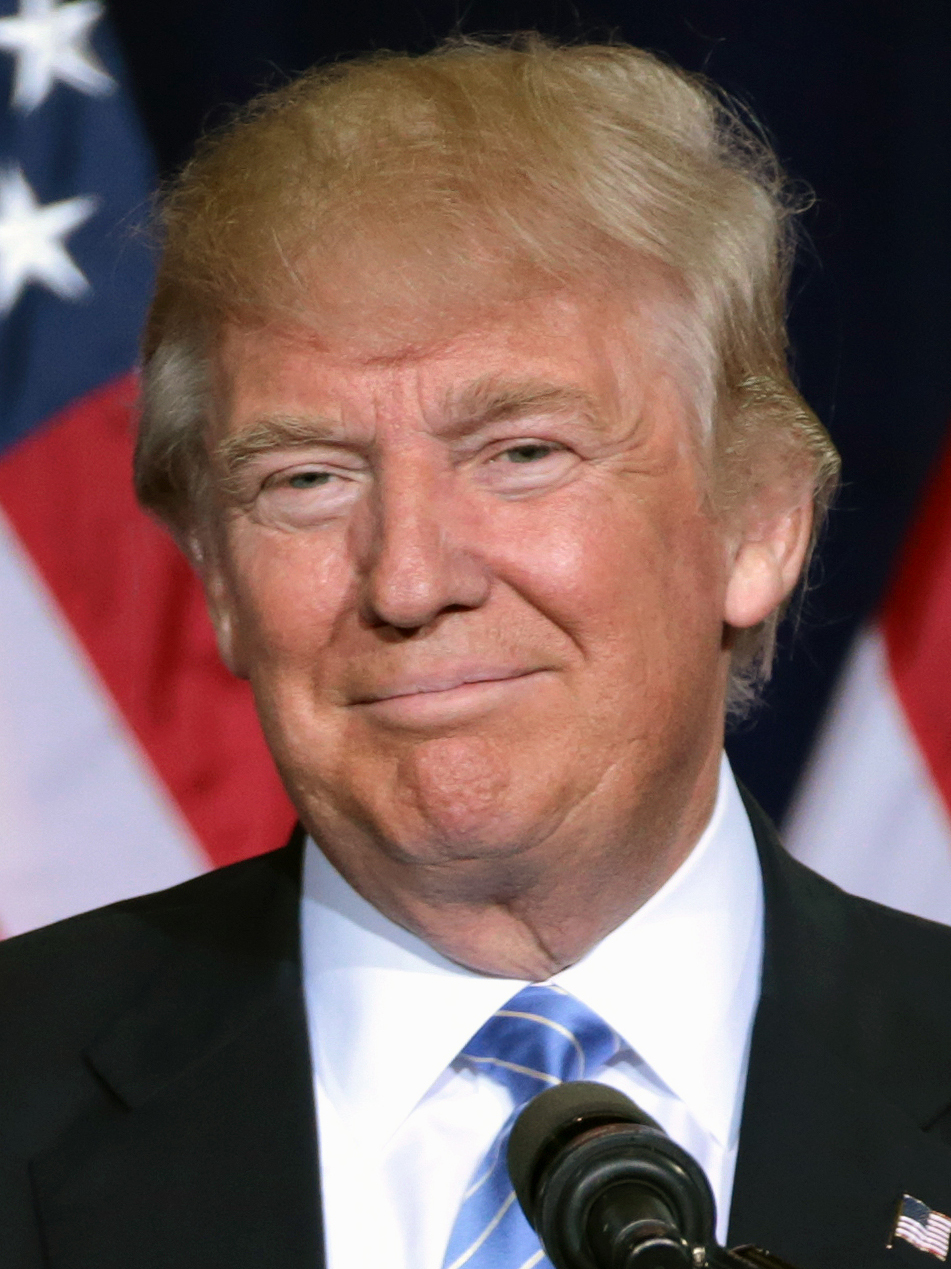

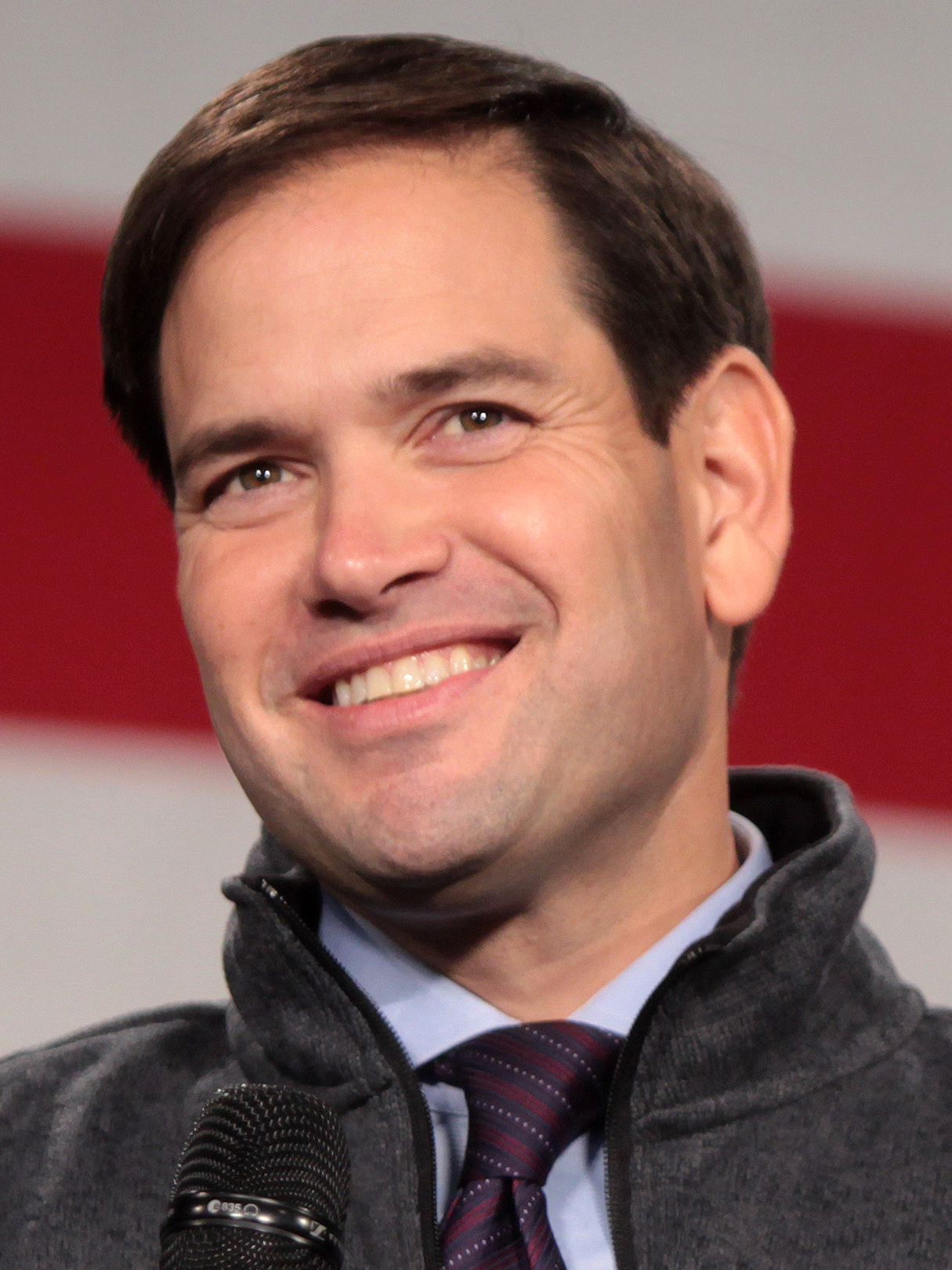

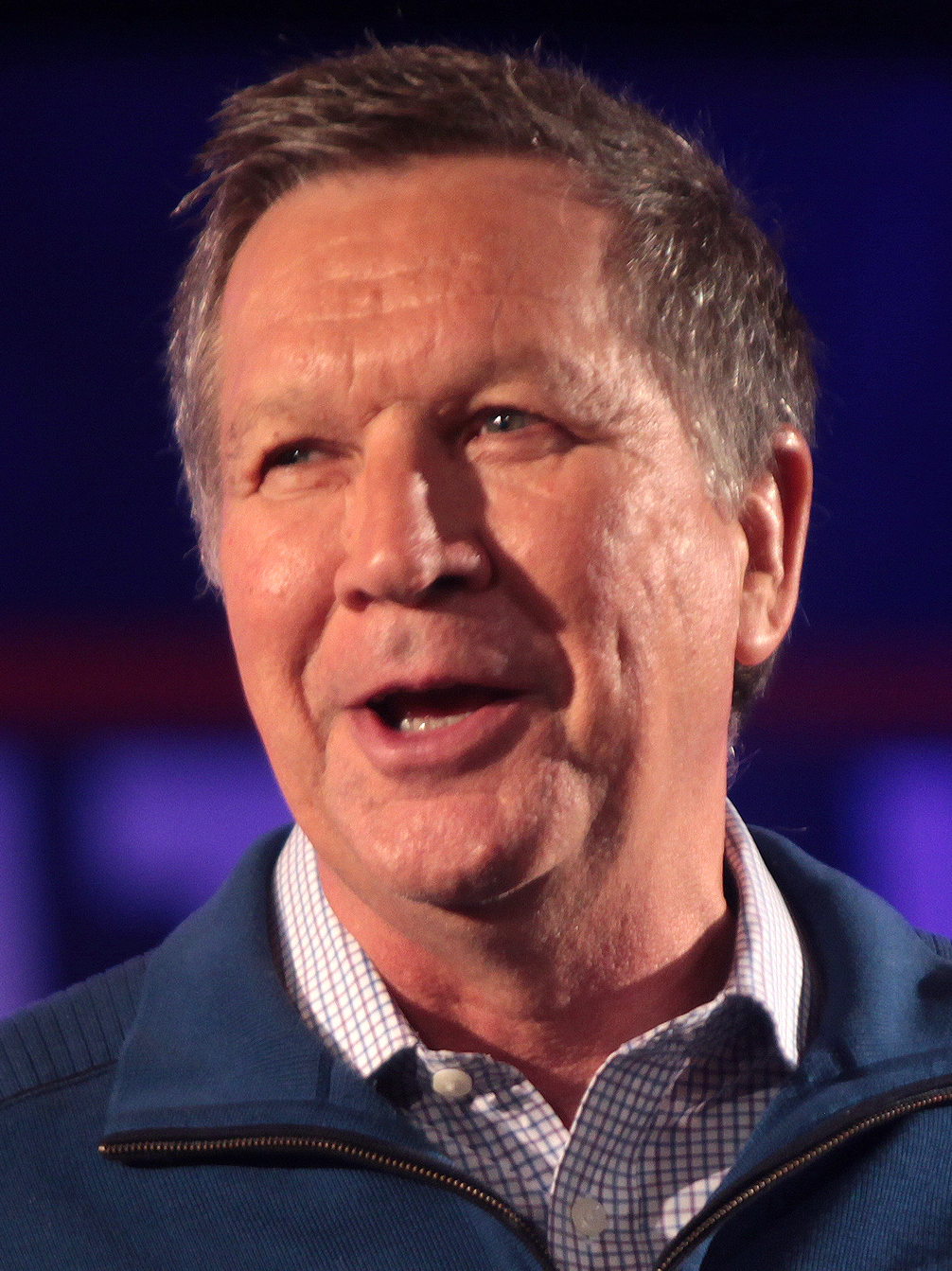
| Candidate | Ted Cruz | Donald Trump |
| Home state | Texas | New York |
| Delegate count | 24 | 9 |
| Popular vote | 37,512 | 18,443 |
| Percentage | 47.50% | 23.35% |
| Candidate | Marco Rubio | John Kasich |
| Home state | Florida | Ohio |
| Delegate count | 6 | 1 |
| Popular vote | 13,295 | 8,741 |
| Percentage | 16.83% | 11.07% |
Congressional district results
Ted Cruz
40–50%
50–60%

Kansas Republican precinct caucuses, March 5, 2016
| Candidate | Votes | Percentage | Actual delegate count | | |
| Candidate | Votes | Percentage | Bound | Unbound | Total |
|---|---|---|---|---|---|
| Ted Cruz | 37,512 | 47.50% | 24 | 0 | 24 |
| Donald Trump | 18,443 | 23.35% | 9 | 0 | 9 |
| Marco Rubio | 13,295 | 16.83% | 6 | 0 | 6 |
| John Kasich | 8,741 | 11.07% | 1 | 0 | 1 |
| Ben Carson (withdrawn) | 582 | 0.74% | 0 | 0 | 0 |
| Uncommitted | 279 | 0.35% | 0 | 0 | 0 |
| Jeb Bush (withdrawn) | 84 | 0.11% | 0 | 0 | 0 |
| Carly Fiorina (withdrawn) | 42 | 0.05% | 0 | 0 | 0 |
| Unprojected delegates: | | | 0 | 0 | 0 |
| Total: | 78,978 | 100.00% | 40 | 0 | 40 |
Source: The Green Papers

Delegates were awarded to candidates at the statewide and congressional district level who got 10% or more of the vote proportionally. The 3 RNC delegates were awarded to the winner.

== General election ==
=== Voting history ===
Kansas has given its electoral votes to the Republican ticket since 1968, and only once to the Democrats (1964) since 1940. At the time, all current statewide officials were Republicans, as were all four members of the state's U.S. House delegation. Mitt Romney defeated Barack Obama by a margin of 60 percent to 38 percent in 2012. A poll conducted by John Zogby found Clinton leading Trump by 7 points in June. In addition, an internal poll for Representative Kevin Yoder, a Republican from Kansas' 3rd congressional district, released an internal poll showing Clinton leading Trump by 6 points in his district. This district voted for Mitt Romney by a 10-point margin in 2012 and has a Cook Partisan Voting Index of R+6. This result, coupled with Clinton's gains in national polls, caused Sabato's Crystal Ball to move the Kansas race from "Safe Republican" to "Likely Republican" on August 18.

=== Predictions ===
| Source | Ranking | As of |
|---|---|---|
| Los Angeles Times | Safe R | November 6, 2016 |
| CNN | Safe R | November 4, 2016 |
| Cook Political Report | Safe R | November 7, 2016 |
| Electoral-vote.com | Safe R | November 8, 2016 |
| Rothenberg Political Report | Safe R | November 7, 2016 |
| Sabato's Crystal Ball | Safe R | November 7, 2016 |
| RealClearPolitics | Likely R | November 8, 2016 |
| Fox News | Safe R | November 7, 2016 |

=== Candidates ===
==== Minor candidates ====
The following received write-in status:

- President: Andrew D. Basiago; Vice President: Karen D. Kinnison
- President: Darrell L Castle; Vice President: Scott N. Bradley
- President: "Rocky" Roque De La Fuente, Vice President: Michael Steinberg
- President: Rocky Giordani; Vice President: Farley M Anderson
- President: James A Hedges; Vice President: Bill V Bayes
- President: Tom Hoefling; Vice President: Steve Schulin
- President: Lynn Kahn; Vice President: Kathy Monahan
- President: Gloria La Riva; Vice President: Eugene Puryer
- President: Michael S. Levinson; Vice President: Perry E. Wharton, II
- President: Michael A Maturen; Vice President: Juan A Munoz
- President: Evan McMullin; Vice President: Nathan D Johnson
- President: Monica G. Moorehead; Vice President: Lamont G. Lilly
- President: Darryl Perry; Vice President: Conan Salada
- President: Marshall R. Schoenke; Vice President: James C. Mitchell, Jr.
- President: Joe C Schriner; Vice President: Joe Moreaux
- President: Mike Smith; Vice President: Daniel White
- President: Timothy Cook; Vice President: John Stein

=== Results ===
2016 United States presidential election in Kansas
| Party | Candidate | Votes | % |
|---|---|---|---|
| Republican | Donald Trump | 671,018 | 56.65% |
| Democratic | Hillary Clinton | 427,005 | 36.05% |
| Libertarian | Gary Johnson | 55,406 | 4.68% |
| Green | Jill Stein | 23,506 | 1.98% |
| Independent | Evan McMullin (write-in) | 6,520 | 0.55% |
| Write-in | | 947 | 0.08% |
| Total votes | | 1,184,402 | 100.00% |

==== By county ====
| County | Donald Trump Republican | | Hillary Clinton Democratic | | Various candidates Other parties | | Margin | | Total |
| County | # | % | # | % | # | % | # | % | Total |
|---|---|---|---|---|---|---|---|---|---|
| Allen | 3,651 | 66.94% | 1,433 | 26.27% | 370 | 6.78% | 2,218 | 40.67% | 5,454 |
| Anderson | 2,435 | 72.69% | 672 | 20.06% | 243 | 7.25% | 1,763 | 52.63% | 3,350 |
| Atchison | 4,049 | 61.58% | 1,989 | 30.25% | 537 | 8.17% | 2,060 | 31.33% | 6,575 |
| Barber | 1,850 | 82.15% | 286 | 12.70% | 116 | 5.15% | 1,564 | 69.45% | 2,252 |
| Barton | 7,888 | 76.82% | 1,839 | 17.91% | 541 | 5.27% | 6,049 | 58.91% | 10,268 |
| Bourbon | 4,424 | 72.61% | 1,336 | 21.93% | 333 | 5.47% | 3,088 | 50.68% | 6,093 |
| Brown | 2,906 | 72.00% | 863 | 21.38% | 267 | 6.62% | 2,043 | 50.62% | 4,036 |
| Butler | 19,073 | 68.96% | 6,573 | 23.77% | 2,011 | 7.27% | 12,500 | 45.20% | 27,657 |
| Chase | 969 | 70.78% | 316 | 23.08% | 84 | 6.14% | 653 | 47.70% | 1,369 |
| Chautauqua | 1,236 | 83.46% | 197 | 13.30% | 48 | 3.24% | 1,039 | 70.16% | 1,481 |
| Cherokee | 6,182 | 71.72% | 2,005 | 23.26% | 433 | 5.02% | 4,177 | 48.46% | 8,620 |
| Cheyenne | 1,173 | 83.37% | 181 | 12.86% | 53 | 3.77% | 992 | 70.50% | 1,407 |
| Clark | 825 | 82.09% | 120 | 11.94% | 60 | 5.97% | 705 | 70.15% | 1,005 |
| Clay | 2,891 | 75.68% | 677 | 17.72% | 252 | 6.60% | 2,214 | 57.96% | 3,820 |
| Cloud | 2,919 | 74.27% | 761 | 19.36% | 250 | 6.36% | 2,158 | 54.91% | 3,930 |
| Coffey | 3,050 | 74.98% | 727 | 17.87% | 291 | 7.15% | 2,323 | 57.10% | 4,068 |
| Comanche | 715 | 82.47% | 102 | 11.76% | 50 | 5.77% | 613 | 70.70% | 867 |
| Cowley | 8,270 | 65.53% | 3,551 | 28.14% | 800 | 6.34% | 4,719 | 37.39% | 12,621 |
| Crawford | 8,624 | 57.91% | 5,199 | 34.91% | 1,068 | 7.17% | 3,425 | 23.00% | 14,891 |
| Decatur | 1,210 | 83.33% | 178 | 12.26% | 64 | 4.41% | 1,032 | 71.07% | 1,452 |
| Dickinson | 6,029 | 73.43% | 1,609 | 19.60% | 572 | 6.97% | 4,420 | 53.84% | 8,210 |
| Doniphan | 2,606 | 77.15% | 587 | 17.38% | 185 | 5.48% | 2,019 | 59.77% | 3,378 |
| Douglas | 14,688 | 29.32% | 31,195 | 62.28% | 4,204 | 8.39% | -16,507 | -32.96% | 50,087 |
| Edwards | 1,037 | 78.62% | 212 | 16.07% | 70 | 5.31% | 825 | 62.55% | 1,319 |
| Elk | 1,048 | 83.24% | 160 | 12.71% | 51 | 4.05% | 888 | 70.53% | 1,259 |
| Ellis | 8,466 | 70.86% | 2,742 | 22.95% | 739 | 6.19% | 5,724 | 47.91% | 11,947 |
| Ellsworth | 1,969 | 73.50% | 521 | 19.45% | 189 | 7.05% | 1,448 | 54.05% | 2,679 |
| Finney | 6,350 | 62.51% | 3,195 | 31.45% | 614 | 6.04% | 3,155 | 31.06% | 10,159 |
| Ford | 5,114 | 66.26% | 2,149 | 27.84% | 455 | 5.90% | 2,965 | 38.42% | 7,718 |
| Franklin | 7,185 | 65.53% | 2,892 | 26.37% | 888 | 8.10% | 4,293 | 39.15% | 10,965 |
| Geary | 4,274 | 56.96% | 2,722 | 36.27% | 508 | 6.77% | 1,552 | 20.68% | 7,504 |
| Gove | 1,140 | 84.88% | 149 | 11.09% | 54 | 4.02% | 991 | 73.79% | 1,343 |
| Graham | 1,025 | 79.83% | 188 | 14.64% | 71 | 5.53% | 837 | 65.19% | 1,284 |
| Grant | 1,804 | 75.51% | 441 | 18.46% | 144 | 6.03% | 1,363 | 57.05% | 2,389 |
| Gray | 1,698 | 82.19% | 263 | 12.73% | 105 | 5.08% | 1,435 | 69.46% | 2,066 |
| Greeley | 534 | 82.15% | 83 | 12.77% | 33 | 5.08% | 451 | 69.38% | 650 |
| Greenwood | 2,160 | 76.06% | 485 | 17.08% | 195 | 6.87% | 1,675 | 58.98% | 2,840 |
| Hamilton | 705 | 80.48% | 121 | 13.81% | 50 | 5.71% | 584 | 66.67% | 876 |
| Harper | 1,996 | 77.42% | 393 | 15.24% | 189 | 7.33% | 1,603 | 62.18% | 2,578 |
| Harvey | 8,668 | 58.11% | 5,068 | 33.98% | 1,180 | 7.91% | 3,600 | 24.14% | 14,916 |
| Haskell | 1,040 | 76.81% | 245 | 18.09% | 69 | 5.10% | 795 | 58.71% | 1,354 |
| Hodgeman | 855 | 84.07% | 124 | 12.19% | 38 | 3.74% | 731 | 71.88% | 1,017 |
| Jackson | 3,939 | 67.70% | 1,512 | 25.99% | 367 | 6.31% | 2,427 | 41.72% | 5,818 |
| Jefferson | 5,213 | 62.53% | 2,518 | 30.20% | 606 | 7.27% | 2,695 | 32.33% | 8,337 |
| Jewell | 1,223 | 81.86% | 180 | 12.05% | 91 | 6.09% | 1,043 | 69.81% | 1,494 |
| Johnson | 137,490 | 47.40% | 129,852 | 44.76% | 22,748 | 7.84% | 7,638 | 2.63% | 290,090 |
| Kearny | 1,075 | 81.69% | 174 | 13.22% | 67 | 5.09% | 901 | 68.47% | 1,316 |
| Kingman | 2,530 | 75.88% | 599 | 17.97% | 205 | 6.15% | 1,931 | 57.92% | 3,334 |
| Kiowa | 900 | 83.41% | 114 | 10.57% | 65 | 6.02% | 786 | 72.85% | 1,079 |
| Labette | 5,335 | 65.81% | 2,291 | 28.26% | 481 | 5.93% | 3,044 | 37.55% | 8,107 |
| Lane | 718 | 82.43% | 106 | 12.17% | 47 | 5.40% | 612 | 70.26% | 871 |
| Leavenworth | 17,638 | 58.21% | 10,209 | 33.69% | 2,454 | 8.10% | 7,429 | 24.52% | 30,301 |
| Lincoln | 1,179 | 80.53% | 215 | 14.69% | 70 | 4.78% | 964 | 65.85% | 1,464 |
| Linn | 3,484 | 78.70% | 736 | 16.63% | 207 | 4.68% | 2,748 | 62.07% | 4,427 |
| Logan | 1,132 | 83.42% | 149 | 10.98% | 76 | 5.60% | 983 | 72.44% | 1,357 |
| Lyon | 6,552 | 53.32% | 4,649 | 37.83% | 1,087 | 8.85% | 1,903 | 15.49% | 12,288 |
| Marion | 4,003 | 71.18% | 1,204 | 21.41% | 417 | 7.41% | 2,799 | 49.77% | 5,624 |
| Marshall | 3,307 | 70.77% | 1,072 | 22.94% | 294 | 6.29% | 2,235 | 47.83% | 4,673 |
| McPherson | 8,549 | 67.09% | 3,226 | 25.32% | 967 | 7.59% | 5,323 | 41.78% | 12,742 |
| Meade | 1,415 | 82.27% | 210 | 12.21% | 95 | 5.52% | 1,205 | 70.06% | 1,720 |
| Miami | 10,003 | 66.59% | 3,991 | 26.57% | 1,028 | 6.84% | 6,012 | 40.02% | 15,022 |
| Mitchell | 2,308 | 78.45% | 477 | 16.21% | 157 | 5.34% | 1,831 | 62.24% | 2,942 |
| Montgomery | 8,679 | 72.30% | 2,637 | 21.97% | 688 | 5.73% | 6,042 | 50.33% | 12,004 |
| Morris | 1,820 | 69.36% | 601 | 22.90% | 203 | 7.74% | 1,219 | 46.46% | 2,624 |
| Morton | 995 | 83.47% | 147 | 12.33% | 50 | 4.19% | 848 | 71.14% | 1,192 |
| Nemaha | 4,124 | 80.52% | 725 | 14.15% | 273 | 5.33% | 3,399 | 66.36% | 5,122 |
| Neosho | 4,431 | 70.18% | 1,501 | 23.77% | 382 | 6.05% | 2,930 | 46.40% | 6,314 |
| Ness | 1,228 | 84.46% | 162 | 11.14% | 64 | 4.40% | 1,066 | 73.31% | 1,454 |
| Norton | 1,840 | 82.36% | 281 | 12.58% | 113 | 5.06% | 1,559 | 69.79% | 2,234 |
| Osage | 4,826 | 68.49% | 1,753 | 24.88% | 467 | 6.63% | 3,073 | 43.61% | 7,046 |
| Osborne | 1,460 | 81.66% | 233 | 13.03% | 95 | 5.31% | 1,227 | 68.62% | 1,788 |
| Ottawa | 2,283 | 78.64% | 424 | 14.61% | 196 | 6.75% | 1,859 | 64.04% | 2,903 |
| Pawnee | 1,904 | 71.55% | 579 | 21.76% | 178 | 6.69% | 1,325 | 49.79% | 2,661 |
| Phillips | 2,233 | 83.82% | 300 | 11.26% | 131 | 4.92% | 1,933 | 72.56% | 2,664 |
| Pottawatomie | 7,612 | 71.19% | 2,225 | 20.81% | 856 | 8.01% | 5,387 | 50.38% | 10,693 |
| Pratt | 2,838 | 73.87% | 771 | 20.07% | 233 | 6.06% | 2,067 | 53.80% | 3,842 |
| Rawlins | 1,220 | 82.88% | 163 | 11.07% | 89 | 6.05% | 1,057 | 71.81% | 1,472 |
| Reno | 15,513 | 64.08% | 6,837 | 28.24% | 1,860 | 7.68% | 8,676 | 35.84% | 24,210 |
| Republic | 2,024 | 80.03% | 375 | 14.83% | 130 | 5.14% | 1,649 | 65.20% | 2,529 |
| Rice | 2,837 | 74.58% | 695 | 18.27% | 272 | 7.15% | 2,142 | 56.31% | 3,804 |
| Riley | 10,107 | 46.94% | 9,341 | 43.38% | 2,084 | 9.68% | 766 | 3.56% | 21,532 |
| Rooks | 2,031 | 83.96% | 275 | 11.37% | 113 | 4.67% | 1,756 | 72.59% | 2,419 |
| Rush | 1,197 | 79.64% | 233 | 15.50% | 73 | 4.86% | 964 | 64.14% | 1,503 |
| Russell | 2,574 | 80.61% | 461 | 14.44% | 158 | 4.95% | 2,113 | 66.18% | 3,193 |
| Saline | 13,828 | 62.67% | 6,317 | 28.63% | 1,919 | 8.70% | 7,511 | 34.04% | 22,064 |
| Scott | 1,865 | 84.70% | 236 | 10.72% | 101 | 4.59% | 1,629 | 73.98% | 2,202 |
| Sedgwick | 104,353 | 55.28% | 69,627 | 36.88% | 14,803 | 7.84% | 34,726 | 18.39% | 188,783 |
| Seward | 3,159 | 62.70% | 1,628 | 32.31% | 251 | 4.98% | 1,531 | 30.39% | 5,038 |
| Shawnee | 35,934 | 47.65% | 33,926 | 44.99% | 5,546 | 7.35% | 2,008 | 2.66% | 75,406 |
| Sheridan | 1,197 | 87.12% | 127 | 9.24% | 50 | 3.64% | 1,070 | 77.87% | 1,374 |
| Sherman | 2,089 | 79.98% | 347 | 13.28% | 176 | 6.74% | 1,742 | 66.69% | 2,612 |
| Smith | 1,661 | 81.34% | 297 | 14.54% | 84 | 4.11% | 1,364 | 66.80% | 2,042 |
| Stafford | 1,490 | 78.59% | 304 | 16.03% | 102 | 5.38% | 1,186 | 62.55% | 1,896 |
| Stanton | 492 | 77.24% | 115 | 18.05% | 30 | 4.71% | 377 | 59.18% | 637 |
| Stevens | 1,599 | 84.56% | 220 | 11.63% | 72 | 3.81% | 1,379 | 72.92% | 1,891 |
| Sumner | 6,984 | 71.84% | 2,076 | 21.35% | 662 | 6.81% | 4,908 | 50.48% | 9,722 |
| Thomas | 2,908 | 81.32% | 473 | 13.23% | 195 | 5.45% | 2,435 | 68.09% | 3,576 |
| Trego | 1,227 | 82.79% | 198 | 13.36% | 57 | 3.85% | 1,029 | 69.43% | 1,482 |
| Wabaunsee | 2,372 | 70.18% | 776 | 22.96% | 232 | 6.86% | 1,596 | 47.22% | 3,380 |
| Wallace | 721 | 90.35% | 46 | 5.76% | 31 | 3.88% | 675 | 84.59% | 798 |
| Washington | 2,194 | 79.35% | 387 | 14.00% | 184 | 6.65% | 1,807 | 65.35% | 2,765 |
| Wichita | 769 | 80.44% | 140 | 14.64% | 47 | 4.92% | 629 | 65.79% | 956 |
| Wilson | 2,788 | 77.64% | 594 | 16.54% | 209 | 5.82% | 2,194 | 61.10% | 3,591 |
| Woodson | 1,082 | 74.98% | 273 | 18.92% | 88 | 6.10% | 809 | 56.06% | 1,443 |
| Wyandotte | 15,806 | 32.40% | 30,146 | 61.80% | 2,829 | 5.80% | -14,340 | -29.40% | 48,781 |
| Totals | 671,018 | 56.65% | 427,005 | 36.05% | 86,379 | 7.29% | 244,013 | 20.60% | 1,184,402 |

==== By congressional district ====
Trump won three of four congressional districts, Clinton winning the remaining one, which elected a Republican.

| District | Clinton | Trump | Representative |
|---|---|---|---|
| 1st | 24% | 69% | Roger Marshall |
| 2nd | 37% | 55% | Lynn Jenkins |
| 3rd | 46% | 45% | Kevin Yoder |
| 4th | 32% | 59% | Mike Pompeo |

== See also ==
- United States presidential elections in Kansas
- First presidency of Donald Trump
- 2016 Democratic Party presidential debates and forums
- 2016 Democratic Party presidential primaries
- 2016 Republican Party presidential debates and forums
- 2016 Republican Party presidential primaries
