= Browns Grove Township, Kansas =

Township in Pawnee County, Kansas, U.S.

Browns Grove Township
- Township
- Location within Pawnee County
- Coordinates: 38.218676°N 99.515421°W
- Country: United States
- State: Kansas
- County: Pawnee

Government
  - Commissioner, District 2: Brock Miller

Area
  - Total: 35.832 sq mi (92.80 km^{2})
  - Land: 35.832 sq mi (92.80 km^{2})
  - Water: 0 sq mi (0 km^{2}) 0%
- Elevation: 2,093 ft (638 m)

Population (2020)
  - Total: 267
  - Density: 7.45/sq mi (2.88/km^{2})
- Time zone: UTC-6 (CST)
  - Summer (DST): UTC-5 (CDT)
- Area code: 620
- GNIS feature ID: 475712

Browns Grove Township is a township in Pawnee County, Kansas, United States. As of the 2020 census, its population was 267.

== History ==
The area that became Shiley Township was detached from Browns Grove Township in the 1910s.

== Geography ==
Browns Grove Township covers an area of 35.832 square miles (92.80 square kilometers). The Pawnee River flows through it.

=== Communities ===
- Burdett

=== Adjacent townships ===
- Shiley Township, Pawnee County (north)
- Lincoln Township, Pawnee County (northeast)
- Grant Township, Pawnee County (east)
- Keysville Township, Pawnee County (southeast)
- Sawmill Township, Pawnee County (south)
- Marena Township, Hodgeman County (west)

== Transportation ==
=== Major highways ===
- K-156
