= Keysville Township, Kansas =

Township in Pawnee County, Kansas, U.S.

Keysville Township
- Township
- Location within Pawnee County
- Coordinates: 38.131718°N 99.405097°W
- Country: United States
- State: Kansas
- County: Pawnee

Government
  - Commissioner, District 2: Brock Miller

Area
  - Total: 36.086 sq mi (93.46 km^{2})
  - Land: 36.086 sq mi (93.46 km^{2})
  - Water: 0 sq mi (0 km^{2}) 0%
- Elevation: 2,100 ft (640 m)

Population (2020)
  - Total: 42
  - Density: 1.2/sq mi (0.45/km^{2})
- Time zone: UTC-6 (CST)
  - Summer (DST): UTC-5 (CDT)
- Area code: 620
- GNIS feature ID: 475836

Keysville Township is a township in Pawnee County, Kansas, United States. As of the 2020 census, its population was 42.

== Geography ==
Keysville Township covers an area of 36.086 square miles (93.46 square kilometers).

=== Adjacent townships ===
Grant Township, Pawnee County
Browns Grove Township, Pawnee County	northwest	north	northeast	Morton Township, Pawnee County
Sawmill Township, Pawnee County	west	self	east	Pleasant Ridge Township, Pawnee County
Jackson Township, Edwards County	southwest	south	southeast	Garfield Township, Pawnee County
Logan Township, Edwards County
