= Sawmill Township, Kansas =

Township in Pawnee County, Kansas, U.S.

Sawmill Township
- Township
- Location within Pawnee County
- Coordinates: 38.138684°N 99.50615°W
- Country: United States
- State: Kansas
- County: Pawnee

Government
  - Commissioner, District 2: Brock Miller

Area
  - Total: 36.039 sq mi (93.34 km^{2})
  - Land: 36.015 sq mi (93.28 km^{2})
  - Water: 0.024 sq mi (0.062 km^{2}) 0.07%
- Elevation: 2,211 ft (674 m)

Population (2020)
  - Total: 20
  - Density: 0.56/sq mi (0.21/km^{2})
- Time zone: UTC-6 (CST)
  - Summer (DST): UTC-5 (CDT)
- Area code: 620
- GNIS feature ID: 475834

Sawmill Township is a township in Pawnee County, Kansas, United States. As of the 2020 census, its population was 20.

== Geography ==
Sawmill Township covers an area of 36.039 square miles (93.34 square kilometers).

=== Adjacent townships ===
Browns Grove Township, Pawnee County
		north	northeast	Grant Township, Pawnee County
Marena Township, Hodgeman County	west	self	east	Keysville Township, Pawnee County
Sterling Township, Hodgeman County	southwest	south	southeast	Logan Township, Edwards County
Jackson Township, Edwards County
