= Johnson Township, Kansas =

Township in Ness County, Kansas, U.S.

Johnson Township
- Township
- Location within Ness County
- Coordinates: 38.341083°N 100.138413°W
- Country: United States
- State: Kansas
- County: Ness

Area
  - Total: 119.09 sq mi (308.4 km^{2})
  - Land: 119.034 sq mi (308.30 km^{2})
  - Water: 0.056 sq mi (0.15 km^{2}) 0.05%

Population (2020)
  - Total: 54
  - Density: 0.45/sq mi (0.18/km^{2})
- Time zone: UTC-6 (CST)
  - Summer (DST): UTC-5 (CDT)
- Area code: 785

Johnson Township is a township in Ness County, Kansas, United States. As of the 2020 census, its population was 54.

== Geography ==
Johnson Township covers an area of 119.09 square miles (308.4 square kilometers).

=== Adjacent townships ===
- Eden Township, Ness County (north)
- Franklin Township, Ness County (east)
- North Roscoe Township, Hodgeman County (south)
- Garfield Township, Finney County (southwest)
- Alamota Township, Lane County (west)
