= Shiley Township, Kansas =

Township in Pawnee County, Kansas, U.S.

Shiley Township
- Township
- Location within Pawnee County
- Coordinates: 38.312979°N 99.522048°W
- Country: United States
- State: Kansas
- County: Pawnee

Government
  - Commissioner, District 2: Brock Miller

Area
  - Total: 36.406 sq mi (94.29 km^{2})
  - Land: 36.353 sq mi (94.15 km^{2})
  - Water: 0.053 sq mi (0.14 km^{2}) 0.15%
- Elevation: 2,202 ft (671 m)

Population (2020)
  - Total: 39
  - Density: 1.1/sq mi (0.41/km^{2})
- Time zone: UTC-6 (CST)
  - Summer (DST): UTC-5 (CDT)
- Area code: 620
- GNIS feature ID: 475713

Shiley Township is a township in Pawnee County, Kansas, United States. As of the 2020 census, its population was 39.

== History ==
Shiley Township was created from part of Browns Grove Township in the 1910s.

== Geography ==
Shiley Township covers an area of 36.406 square miles (94.29 square kilometers).

=== Adjacent townships ===
Alexander-Belle Prairie Township, Rush County
		north	northeast	Union Township, Rush County
Highpoint Township, Ness County	west	self	east	Lincoln Township, Pawnee County
Marena Township, Hodgeman County	southwest	south
Browns Grove Township, Pawnee County
