= Benton Township, Kansas =

Benton Township, Kansas may refer to:

- Benton Township, Atchison County, Kansas
- Benton Township, Butler County, Kansas
- Benton Township, Hodgeman County, Kansas

== See also ==
- List of Kansas townships
- Benton Township (disambiguation)
