= Nevada Township, Kansas =

Township in Ness County, Kansas, U.S.

Nevada Township
- Township
- Location within Ness County
- Coordinates: 38.629588°N 99.908674°W
- Country: United States
- State: Kansas
- County: Ness

Area
  - Total: 107.170 sq mi (277.57 km^{2})
  - Land: 107.126 sq mi (277.46 km^{2})
  - Water: 0.044 sq mi (0.11 km^{2}) 0.04%

Population (2020)
  - Total: 343
  - Density: 3.20/sq mi (1.24/km^{2})
- Time zone: UTC-6 (CST)
  - Summer (DST): UTC-5 (CDT)
- Area code: 785

Nevada Township is a township in Ness County, Kansas, United States. As of the 2020 census, its population was 343.

== Geography ==
Nevada Township covers an area of 107.170 square miles (277.57 square kilometers).

=== Communities ===
- Ransom

=== Adjacent townships ===
- WaKeeney Township, Trego County (north)
- Waring Township, Ness County (east)
- Bazine Township, Ness County (southeast)
- Center Township, Ness County (south)
- Forrester Township, Ness County (southwest)
- Ohio Township, Ness County (west)
- Collyer Township, Trego County (northwest)

=== Major highways ===
- US-283
- K-4
