= Hallet Township, Kansas =

Hallet Township Hodgeman County, Kansas
- Township
- Location within Hodgeman County

- Location within Kansas
- Coordinates: 38°05′14″N 100°03′49″W
- Country: United States
- State: Kansas
- County: Hodgeman

Area
  - Total: 70.33 sq mi (182.16 km^{2})
  - Land: 70.33 sq mi (182.16 km^{2})
  - Water: 0 sq mi (0 km^{2}) 0%
- Elevation: 2,480 ft (760 m)

Population (2020)
  - Total: 45
  - Density: 0.64/sq mi (0.25/km^{2})
- Time zone: UTC-6 (CST)
  - Summer (DST): UTC-5 (CDT)
- FIPS code: 20-29525
- GNIS ID: 471563

Hallet Township is a township in Hodgeman County, Kansas, United States. As of the 2020 census, its population was 45.

== Geography ==
Hallet Township covers an area of 70.33 square miles (182.2 km^{2}) and contains no incorporated settlements.
