= Hampton-Fairview Township, Kansas =

Township in Rush County, Kansas, U.S.

Hampton-Fairview Township
- Township
- Location within Rush County
- Coordinates: 38.63211°N 99.478504°W
- Country: United States
- State: Kansas
- County: Rush
- Established: 1970s

Government
  - District 3 County Commissioner: Les Rogers

Area
  - Total: 106.559 sq mi (275.99 km^{2})
  - Land: 106.444 sq mi (275.69 km^{2})
  - Water: 0.115 sq mi (0.30 km^{2}) 0.11%

Population (2020)
  - Total: 248
  - Density: 2.33/sq mi (0.900/km^{2})
- Time zone: UTC-6 (CST)
  - Summer (DST): UTC-5 (CDT)
- Area code: 785
- GNIS feature ID: 475382

Hampton-Fairview Township is a township in Rush County, Kansas, United States. As of the 2020 census, its population was 248.

== History ==
As its name implies, Hampton-Fairview Township was originally two separate townships: Hampton Township and Fairview Township. Hampton Township was established in 1878 from parts of Alexander Township (now part of Alexander-Belle Prairie Township) and Brookdale Township (now part of La Crosse-Brookdale Township). The two townships were merged together in the 1970s to create Hampton-Fairview Township. In addition, another part of Alexander Township was given to it as well.

== Geography ==
Hampton-Fairview Township covers an area of 106.559 square miles (275.99 square kilometers).

=== Communities ===
- McCracken

=== Adjacent townships ===
Big Creek Township, Ellis County
		north
Waring Township, Ness County	west	self	east	Big Timber Township, Rush County
Bazine Township, Ness County	southwest	south	southeast	La Cross-Brookdale Township, Rush County
Alexander-Belle Prairie Township, Rush County

== Transportation ==
=== Major highways ===
- K-4
