= Forrester Township, Kansas =

Township in Ness County, Kansas, U.S.

Forrester Township
- Township
- Location within Ness County
- Coordinates: 38.508111°N 99.991345°W
- Country: United States
- State: Kansas
- County: Ness

Area
  - Total: 79.746 sq mi (206.54 km^{2})
  - Land: 79.746 sq mi (206.54 km^{2})
  - Water: 0 sq mi (0 km^{2}) 0%

Population (2020)
  - Total: 93
  - Density: 1.2/sq mi (0.45/km^{2})
- Time zone: UTC-6 (CST)
  - Summer (DST): UTC-5 (CDT)
- Area code: 785

Forrester Township is a township in Ness County, Kansas, United States. As of the 2020 census, its population was 93.

== Geography ==
Forrester Township covers an area of 79.746 square miles (206.54 square kilometers).

=== Communities ===
- part of Ness City

=== Adjacent townships ===
- Nevada Township, Ness County (northeast)
- Center Township, Ness County (east)
- Franklin Township, Ness County (south)
- Eden Township, Ness County (southwest)
- Ohio Township, Ness County (northwest)

=== Major highways ===
- K-96
