= Union Township, Rush County, Kansas =

Township in Rush County, Kansas, U.S.

Union Township
- Township
- Location within Rush County
- Coordinates: 38.415217°N 99.41205°W
- Country: United States
- State: Kansas
- County: Rush
- Established: 1878

Government
  - District 3 County Commissioner: Les Rogers

Area
  - Total: 54.258 sq mi (140.53 km^{2})
  - Land: 54.251 sq mi (140.51 km^{2})
  - Water: 0.007 sq mi (0.018 km^{2}) 0.01%

Population (2020)
  - Total: 52
  - Density: 0.96/sq mi (0.37/km^{2})
- Time zone: UTC-6 (CST)
  - Summer (DST): UTC-5 (CDT)
- Area code: 785
- GNIS feature ID: 475608

Union Township is a township in Rush County, Kansas, United States. As of the 2020 census, its population was 52.

== History ==
Union Township was established in 1878 from part of Brookdale Township (now part of La Crosse-Brookdale Township).

== Geography ==
Union Township covers an area of 54.258 square miles (140.53 square kilometers).

=== Communities ===
- Nekoma

=== Adjacent townships ===
La Crosse-Brookdale Township, Rush County
| | | north |
| Alexander-Belle Prairie Township, Rush County | west | self | east | Center Township, Rush County |
| Shiley Township, Pawnee County | southwest | south | southeast | Conkling Township, Pawnee County |
Lincoln Township, Pawnee County

== Transportation ==
=== Major highways ===
- K-96
