= Hodgeman County, Kansas =

County in Kansas, United States

- County
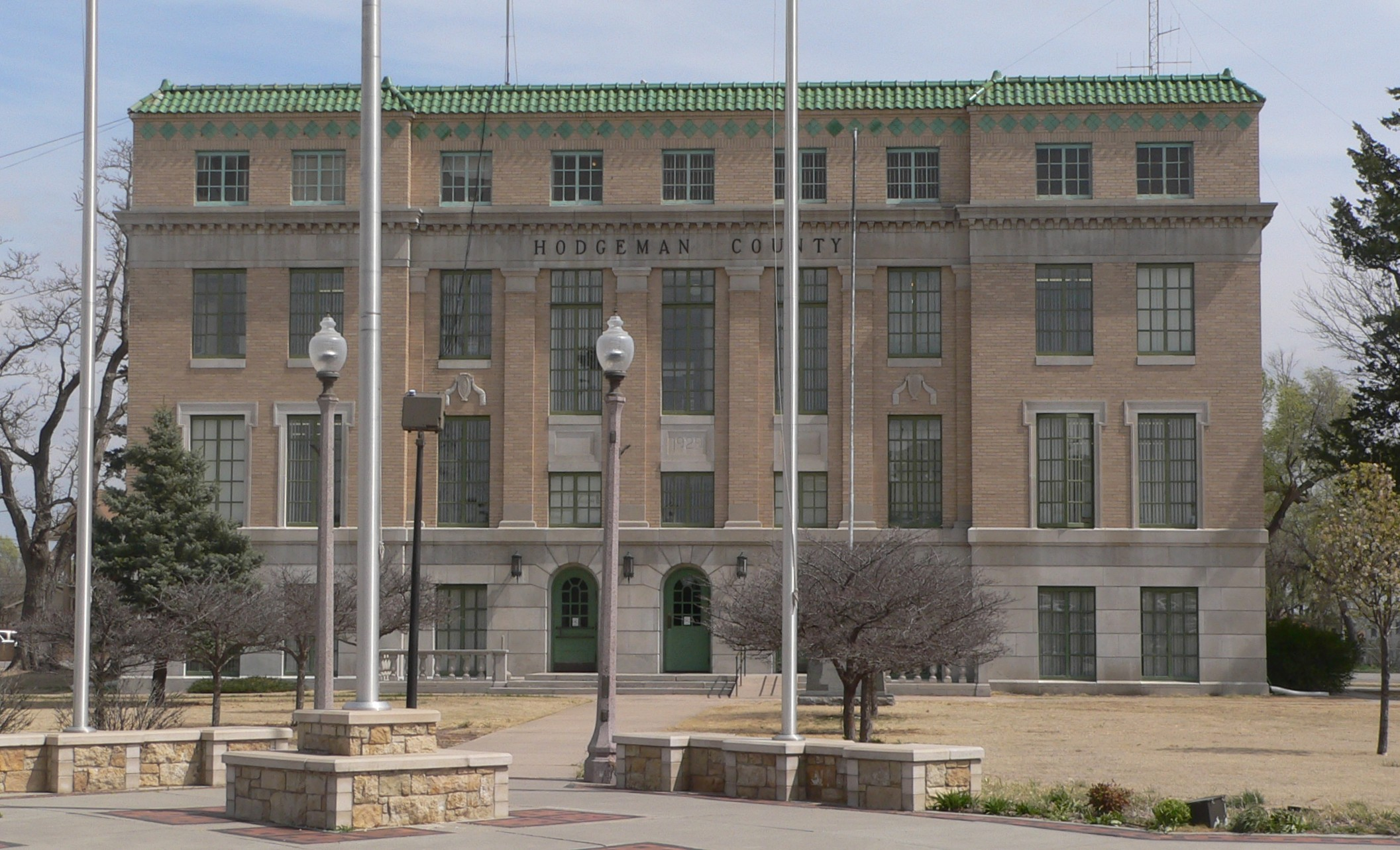
- Hodgeman County Courthouse in Jetmore (2016)

- Location within the U.S. state of Kansas
- Coordinates: 38°02′38″N 100°10′17″W
- Country: United States
- State: Kansas
- Founded: February 26, 1867
- Named for: Amos Hodgman
- Seat: Jetmore
- Largest city: Jetmore

Area
  - Total: 860 sq mi (2,200 km^{2})
  - Land: 860 sq mi (2,200 km^{2})
  - Water: 0.3 sq mi (0.78 km^{2}) 0.04%

Population (2020)
  - Estimate (2025): 1,619 ▼
  - Density: 2/sq mi (0.77/km^{2})
- Time zone: UTC−6 (Central)
  - Summer (DST): UTC−5 (CDT)
- Congressional district: 1st
- Website: hodgemancountyks.com

Hodgeman County is a county located in the U.S. state of Kansas. Its county seat and most populous city is Jetmore. As of the 2020 census, the county population was 1,723. It was named for Amos Hodgman, a member of the 7th Regiment Kansas Volunteer Cavalry.

== History ==
In 1867, Hodgeman County was established and named for Amos Hodgman, member of the 7th Regiment Kansas Volunteer Cavalry. The letter E was later added to the namesake's name. The county was not formally organized until 1879.

The Homestead Act of 1862 drew many settlers to the region beginning in the spring of 1877, with only a small amount of wheat sown that year due to hail damage. Crop yields improved in 1878. The county initially had several competing towns vying to become the county seat, including Buckner (present-day Jetmore), which eventually won out. While many small towns, such as Kidderville and Milroy, had sprung up in the early years of the county, only Jetmore and Hanston survived as permanent settlements.

By the late 1870s, Hodgeman County had a population of approximately 1,500 people.

In 1882, 24 families of Russian Jews affiliated with the Am Olam agricultural collective movement founded a colony in Hodgeman County named Beersheba, which included sod homes and a sod synagogue.

== Geography ==
According to the United States Census Bureau, the county has a total area of 860 square miles (2,200 km^{2}), of which 0.3 square miles (0.78 km^{2}) (0.04%) is covered by water.

=== Adjacent counties ===
- Ness County (north)
- Pawnee County (east)
- Edwards County (southeast)
- Ford County (south)
- Gray County (southwest)
- Finney County (west)

== Demographics ==
Historical population
Census	Pop.	Note	%±
1880	1,704		—
1890	2,895		69.9%
1900	2,032		−29.8%
1910	2,930		44.2%
1920	3,734		27.4%
1930	4,157		11.3%
1940	3,535		−15.0%
1950	3,310		−6.4%
1960	3,115		−5.9%
1970	2,662		−14.5%
1980	2,269		−14.8%
1990	2,177		−4.1%
2000	2,085		−4.2%
2010	1,916		−8.1%
2020	1,723		−10.1%
2025 (est.)	1,619	▼	−6.0%
U.S. Decennial Census; 1790-1960 1900-1990; 1990-2000 2010-2020

=== Racial and ethnic composition ===
Hodgeman County, Kansas – Racial and ethnic composition Note: the US Census treats Hispanic/Latino as an ethnic category. This table excludes Latinos from the racial categories and assigns them to a separate category. Hispanics/Latinos may be of any race.
Race / Ethnicity (NH = Non-Hispanic)	Pop 1980	Pop 1990	Pop 2000	Pop 2010	Pop 2020	% 1980	% 1990	% 2000	% 2010	% 2020
White alone (NH)	2,226	2,120	1,992	1,748	1,546	98.10%	97.38%	95.54%	91.23%	89.73%
Black or African American alone (NH)	21	22	19	20	14	0.93%	1.01%	0.91%	1.04%	0.81%
Native American or Alaska Native alone (NH)	4	2	3	3	7	0.18%	0.09%	0.14%	0.16%	0.41%
Asian alone (NH)	2	1	0	8	10	0.09%	0.05%	0.00%	0.42%	0.58%
Native Hawaiian or Pacific Islander alone (NH)	x	x	0	0	1	x	x	0.00%	0.00%	0.06%
Other race alone (NH)	1	0	0	0	2	0.04%	0.00%	0.00%	0.00%	0.12%
Mixed race or Multiracial (NH)	x	x	15	19	47	x	x	0.72%	0.99%	2.73%
Hispanic or Latino (any race)	15	32	56	118	96	0.66%	1.47%	2.69%	6.16%	5.57%
Total	2,269	2,177	2,085	1,916	1,723	100.00%	100.00%	100.00%	100.00%	100.00%

=== 2020 census ===
As of the 2020 census, the county had a population of 1,723, and the median age was 45.5 years. 24.8% of residents were under the age of 18 and 22.3% were 65 years of age or older. For every 100 females there were 99.4 males, and for every 100 females age 18 and over there were 101.1 males age 18 and over. 0.0% of residents lived in urban areas, while 100.0% lived in rural areas.

The racial makeup of the county was 91.9% White, 0.8% Black or African American, 0.7% American Indian and Alaska Native, 0.7% Asian, 0.1% Native Hawaiian and Pacific Islander, 1.1% from some other race, and 4.7% from two or more races. Hispanic or Latino residents of any race comprised 5.6% of the population.

There were 724 households in the county, of which 31.5% had children under the age of 18 living with them and 18.9% had a female householder with no spouse or partner present. About 27.9% of all households were made up of individuals and 15.2% had someone living alone who was 65 years of age or older. There were 842 housing units, of which 14.0% were vacant. Among occupied housing units, 76.2% were owner-occupied and 23.8% were renter-occupied. The homeowner vacancy rate was 1.4% and the rental vacancy rate was 9.0%.

=== 2000 census ===
As of the census of 2000, 2,085 people, 796 households, and 581 families were residing in the county. The population density was 2 people per square mile (0.77 people/km^{2}). The 945 housing units had an average density of 1 per square mile (0.39/km^{2}). The racial makeup of the county was 97.31% White, 0.91% Black or African American, 0.24% Native American, 0.48% from other races, and 1.06% from two or more races. Hispanics or Latinos of any race were 2.69% of the population.

Of the 796 households, 34.7% had children under 18 living with them, 65.1% were married couples living together, 4.4% had a female householder with no husband present, and 27.0% were not families. About 24.7% of all households were made up of individuals, and 14.2% had someone living alone who was 65 or older. The average household size was 2.58 and the average family size was 3.09.

In the county, the age distribution was 29.0% under 18, 4.7% from 18 to 24, 25.2% from 25 to 44, 22.1% from 45 to 64, and 19.0% who were 65 or older. The median age was 40 years. For every 100 females, there were 97.3 males. For every 100 females 18 and over, there were 96.9 males.

The median income for a household in the county was $35,994 and for a family was $39,358. Males had a median income of $27,568 versus $21,534 for females. The per capita income for the county was $15,599. About 10.70% of families and 11.50% of the population were below the poverty line, including 11.9% of those under 18 and 7.7% of those 65 or over.

== Government ==
=== Presidential elections ===
Hodgeman County is a Republican stronghold. Only six Republican presidential candidates have failed to win the county from 1888 to the present, and no Democrat has to managed to win even a quarter of the county's votes since Michael Dukakis in 1988. The last Democrat to carry the county was Jimmy Carter in 1976.

Presidential election results

United States presidential election results for Hodgeman County, Kansas
Year	Republican		Democratic		Third party(ies)	
Year	No.	%	No.	%	No.	%
1888	563	63.98%	220	25.00%	97	11.02%
1892	363	61.21%	0	0.00%	230	38.79%
1896	262	53.69%	224	45.90%	2	0.41%
1900	323	56.27%	245	42.68%	6	1.05%
1904	449	67.52%	192	28.87%	24	3.61%
1908	411	57.08%	290	40.28%	19	2.64%
1912	136	17.17%	302	38.13%	354	44.70%
1916	564	37.45%	761	50.53%	181	12.02%
1920	945	73.31%	306	23.74%	38	2.95%
1924	899	60.66%	367	24.76%	216	14.57%
1928	1,122	67.55%	528	31.79%	11	0.66%
1932	847	45.56%	988	53.15%	24	1.29%
1936	781	40.13%	1,162	59.71%	3	0.15%
1940	1,092	60.87%	690	38.46%	12	0.67%
1944	982	66.31%	490	33.09%	9	0.61%
1948	945	60.77%	590	37.94%	20	1.29%
1952	1,330	76.44%	392	22.53%	18	1.03%
1956	1,113	71.62%	435	27.99%	6	0.39%
1960	926	61.45%	570	37.82%	11	0.73%
1964	607	42.33%	821	57.25%	6	0.42%
1968	756	59.20%	387	30.31%	134	10.49%
1972	853	68.40%	331	26.54%	63	5.05%
1976	576	43.80%	697	53.00%	42	3.19%
1980	831	66.16%	339	26.99%	86	6.85%
1984	939	74.17%	306	24.17%	21	1.66%
1988	732	60.40%	439	36.22%	41	3.38%
1992	625	50.85%	258	20.99%	346	28.15%
1996	808	69.42%	251	21.56%	105	9.02%
2000	835	76.75%	217	19.94%	36	3.31%
2004	953	80.56%	223	18.85%	7	0.59%
2008	865	78.92%	211	19.25%	20	1.82%
2012	868	81.89%	179	16.89%	13	1.23%
2016	855	84.07%	124	12.19%	38	3.74%
2020	875	83.73%	154	14.74%	16	1.53%
2024	817	84.58%	136	14.08%	13	1.35%

=== Laws ===
Following amendment to the Kansas Constitution in 1986, the county remained an alcohol-free, or "dry", county until 2004, when voters approved the sale of alcoholic beverages by the individual drink with a 30% food sales requirement.

== Education ==
=== Unified school districts ===
- Hodgeman County USD 227

== Communities ==
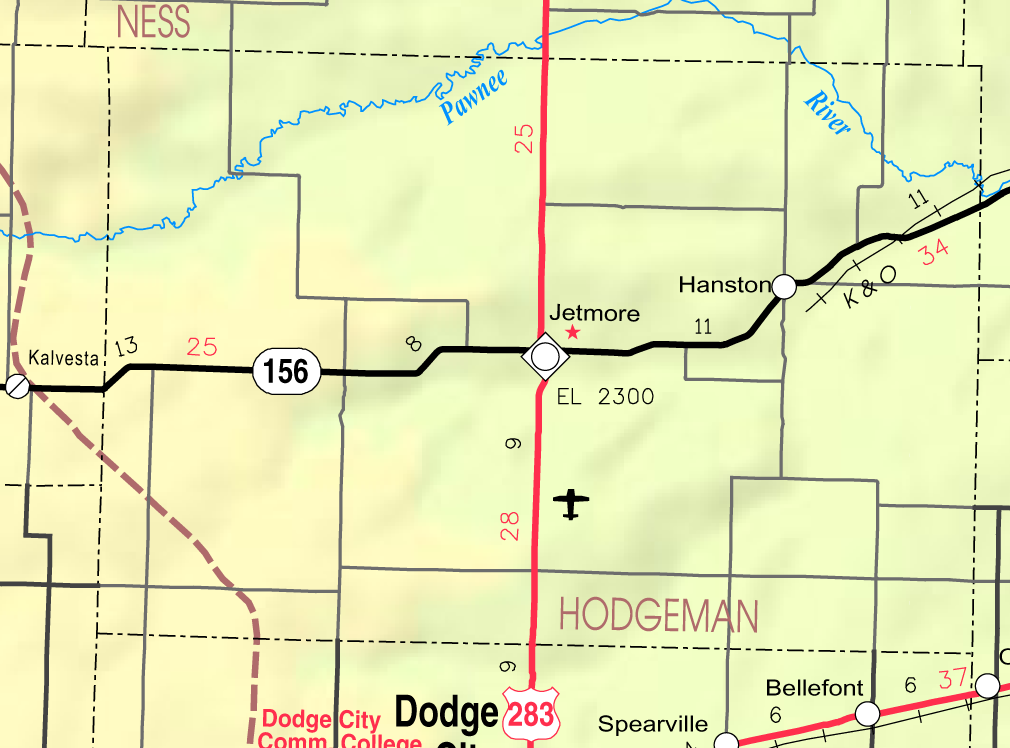
2005 map of Hodgeman County (map legend)

List of townships / incorporated cities / unincorporated communities / extinct former communities within Hodgeman County.

=== Cities ===
- Hanston
- Jetmore (county seat)

=== Townships ===
Hodgeman County is divided into nine townships. None of the cities within the county is considered governmentally independent, and all figures for the townships include those of the cities. In the following table, the population center is the largest city (or cities) included in that township's population total, if it is of a significant size.

Township	FIPS	Population center	Population (2000)	Population density /km^{2} (/sq mi)	Land area km^{2} (sq mi)	Water area km^{2} (sq mi)	Water %	Geographic coordinates
Benton	06225		48	1 (1)	93 (36)	0 (0)	0.13%	38°2′39″N 100°10′18″W
Center	11725		1,121	3 (8)	374 (144)	0 (0)	0.05%	38°5′7″N 99°53′46″W
Hallet	29525		62	0 (1)	182 (70)	0 (0)	0%	38°5′40″N 100°4′10″W
Marena	44575		432	1 (3)	373 (144)	0 (0)	0.05%	38°9′52″N 99°41′19″W
North Roscoe	51350		51	0 (0)	276 (106)	0 (0)	0.05%	38°10′29″N 100°7′14″W
Sawlog	63225		93	0 (1)	187 (72)	0 (0)	0.02%	37°58′18″N 99°54′32″W
South Roscoe	66900		76	0 (1)	185 (71)	0 (0)	0.04%	37°56′59″N 100°6′31″W
Sterling	68175		144	0 (1)	374 (144)	0 (0)	0.02%	37°59′46″N 99°40′24″W
Valley	72825		58	0 (1)	185 (71)	0 (0)	0%	38°12′41″N 99°51′47″W
Sources: "Census 2000 U.S. Gazetteer Files". U.S. Census Bureau, Geography Division. Archived from the original on August 2, 2002.

== In popular culture ==
At the beginning of the 1992 film Unforgiven, the protagonist William Munny, played by Clint Eastwood, is living in Hodgeman County and working as a pig farmer, while attempting to hide evidence of his violent past from all those around him.

== See also ==
Community information for Kansas

- Kansas locations by per capita income
- List of counties in Kansas
- List of townships in Kansas
- List of cities in Kansas
- List of unincorporated communities in Kansas
- List of ghost towns in Kansas
