= Ness County, Kansas =

County in Kansas, United States

- County
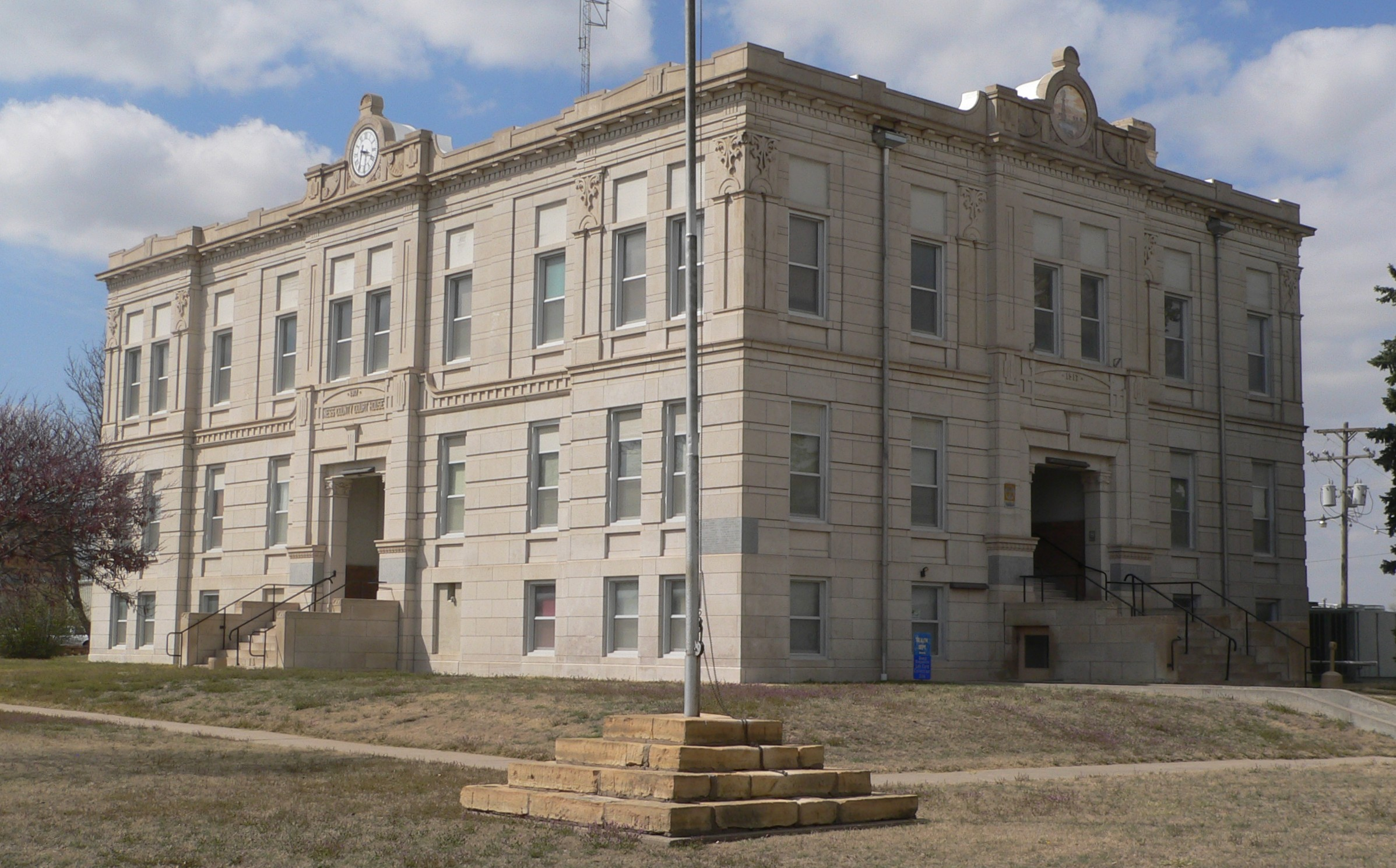
- Ness County Courthouse in Ness City (2016)

- Location within the U.S. state of Kansas
- Coordinates: 38°27′29″N 99°41′15″W
- Country: United States
- State: Kansas
- Founded: February 26, 1867
- Named for: Noah V. Ness
- Seat: Ness City
- Largest city: Ness City

Area
  - Total: 1,075 sq mi (2,780 km^{2})
  - Land: 1,075 sq mi (2,780 km^{2})
  - Water: 0.3 sq mi (0.78 km^{2}) 0.02%

Population (2020)
  - Estimate (2025): 2,617 ▼
  - Density: 2.5/sq mi (0.97/km^{2})
- Time zone: UTC−6 (Central)
  - Summer (DST): UTC−5 (CDT)
- Congressional district: 1st
- Website: nesscountyks.gov

Ness County is a county located in the U.S. state of Kansas. Its county seat and largest city is Ness City. As of the 2020 census, the county population was 2,687. The county was named for Noah Ness, a corporal of the 7th Kansas Cavalry.

== History ==
Ness County was established on February 26, 1867. It was the site of an 1867 confrontation between the Cheyenne and Sioux tribes and General Winfield Scott Hancock at the Indian Village on Pawnee Fork, where the fighting helped inform George A. Custer's tactics throughout his career.

The county was first organized in 1873 but disestablished a year later. It was reorganized on April 14, 1880. The founding of Ness City, the county seat, followed closely after the county's organization in 1867. Ross Calhoun, the "Father of Ness City," arrived in 1877 or 1878, opened the first general store, and formally laid out the town in October 1878, inviting settlers to join him. A bitter county seat fight ensued among Ness City, Sidney, and Clarinda, lasting from 1880 to 1883, with accusations of bribery and fraud, before Ness City was confirmed as the county seat.

Ness County's population peaked in the 1930 census at 8,358 and has steadily declined since then, reaching 2,687 in the 2020 census. From 2010 to 2020, the county's population dropped by 13.5%, the third largest percentage drop in the state.

== Geography ==
According to the U.S. Census Bureau, the county has a total area of 1,075 square miles (2,780 km^{2}), of which 1,075 square miles (2,780 km^{2}) is land and 0.3 square miles (0.78 km^{2}) (0.02%) is water.

=== Adjacent counties ===
- Trego County (north)
- Ellis County (northeast)
- Rush County (east)
- Pawnee County (southeast)
- Hodgeman County (south)
- Finney County (southwest)
- Lane County (west)
- Gove County (northwest)

== Demographics ==
Historical population
Census	Pop.	Note	%±
1880	3,722		—
1890	4,944		32.8%
1900	4,535		−8.3%
1910	5,883		29.7%
1920	7,490		27.3%
1930	8,358		11.6%
1940	6,864		−17.9%
1950	6,322		−7.9%
1960	5,470		−13.5%
1970	4,791		−12.4%
1980	4,498		−6.1%
1990	4,033		−10.3%
2000	3,454		−14.4%
2010	3,107		−10.0%
2020	2,687		−13.5%
2025 (est.)	2,617	▼	−2.6%
U.S. Decennial Census; 1790-1960 1900-1990; 1990-2000 2010-2020

=== Racial and ethnic composition ===
Ness County, Kansas – Racial and ethnic composition Note: the US Census treats Hispanic/Latino as an ethnic category. This table excludes Latinos from the racial categories and assigns them to a separate category. Hispanics/Latinos may be of any race.
Race / Ethnicity (NH = Non-Hispanic)	Pop 1980	Pop 1990	Pop 2000	Pop 2010	Pop 2020	% 1980	% 1990	% 2000	% 2010	% 2020
White alone (NH)	4,463	4,001	3,369	2,828	2,305	99.22%	99.21%	97.54%	91.02%	85.78%
Black or African American alone (NH)	3	0	1	17	2	0.07%	0.00%	0.03%	0.55%	0.07%
Native American or Alaska Native alone (NH)	2	4	5	3	9	0.04%	0.10%	0.14%	0.10%	0.33%
Asian alone (NH)	14	5	3	3	2	0.31%	0.12%	0.09%	0.10%	0.07%
Native Hawaiian or Pacific Islander alone (NH)	x	x	0	0	0	x	x	0.00%	0.00%	0.00%
Other race alone (NH)	6	0	0	2	6	0.13%	0.00%	0.00%	0.06%	0.22%
Mixed race or Multiracial (NH)	x	x	24	25	58	x	x	0.69%	0.80%	2.16%
Hispanic or Latino (any race)	10	23	52	229	305	0.22%	0.57%	1.51%	7.37%	11.35%
Total	4,498	4,033	3,454	3,107	2,687	100.00%	100.00%	100.00%	100.00%	100.00%

=== 2020 census ===
As of the 2020 census, the county had a population of 2,687. The median age was 50.3 years. 20.0% of residents were under the age of 18 and 27.5% of residents were 65 years of age or older. For every 100 females there were 99.8 males, and for every 100 females age 18 and over there were 98.5 males age 18 and over.

The racial makeup of the county was 87.3% White, 0.1% Black or African American, 0.7% American Indian and Alaska Native, 0.1% Asian, 0.1% Native Hawaiian and Pacific Islander, 6.4% from some other race, and 5.3% from two or more races. Hispanic or Latino residents of any race comprised 11.4% of the population.

0.0% of residents lived in urban areas, while 100.0% lived in rural areas.

There were 1,216 households in the county, of which 23.4% had children under the age of 18 living with them and 22.1% had a female householder with no spouse or partner present. About 34.4% of all households were made up of individuals and 16.9% had someone living alone who was 65 years of age or older.

There were 1,548 housing units, of which 21.4% were vacant. Among occupied housing units, 81.8% were owner-occupied and 18.2% were renter-occupied. The homeowner vacancy rate was 3.3% and the rental vacancy rate was 22.9%.

=== 2000 census ===
As of the census of 2000, there were 3,454 people, 1,516 households, and 977 families residing in the county. The population density was 3 people per square mile (1.2 people/km^{2}). There were 1,835 housing units at an average density of 2 per square mile (0.77/km^{2}). The racial makeup of the county was 98.23% White, 0.06% Black or African American, 0.23% Native American, 0.09% Asian, 0.49% from other races, and 0.90% from two or more races. 1.51% of the population were Hispanic or Latino of any race.

There were 1,516 households, out of which 26.10% had children under the age of 18 living with them, 57.10% were married couples living together, 4.70% had a female householder with no husband present, and 35.50% were non-families. 33.50% of all households were made up of individuals, and 18.30% had someone living alone who was 65 years of age or older. The average household size was 2.23 and the average family size was 2.83.

In the county, the population was spread out, with 22.90% under the age of 18, 4.60% from 18 to 24, 24.00% from 25 to 44, 24.20% from 45 to 64, and 24.20% who were 65 years of age or older. The median age was 44 years. For every 100 females there were 98.50 males. For every 100 females age 18 and over, there were 95.10 males.

The median income for a household in the county was $32,340, and the median income for a family was $39,775. Males had a median income of $27,892 versus $20,037 for females. The per capita income for the county was $17,787. About 6.50% of families and 8.70% of the population were below the poverty line, including 9.50% of those under age 18 and 10.20% of those age 65 or over.

== Government ==
=== Presidential elections ===
Presidential election results

United States presidential election results for Ness County, Kansas
Year	Republican		Democratic		Third party(ies)	
Year	No.	%	No.	%	No.	%
1888	891	57.26%	470	30.21%	195	12.53%
1892	495	44.43%	0	0.00%	619	55.57%
1896	354	39.03%	526	57.99%	27	2.98%
1900	511	44.90%	583	51.23%	44	3.87%
1904	687	58.82%	188	16.10%	293	25.09%
1908	635	47.96%	461	34.82%	228	17.22%
1912	232	18.13%	458	35.78%	590	46.09%
1916	927	37.62%	1,213	49.23%	324	13.15%
1920	1,402	69.30%	492	24.32%	129	6.38%
1924	1,629	64.64%	541	21.47%	350	13.89%
1928	2,058	71.51%	784	27.24%	36	1.25%
1932	1,409	42.65%	1,772	53.63%	123	3.72%
1936	1,302	39.19%	2,002	60.26%	18	0.54%
1940	1,826	58.68%	1,230	39.52%	56	1.80%
1944	1,745	65.45%	876	32.86%	45	1.69%
1948	1,689	58.10%	1,130	38.87%	88	3.03%
1952	2,288	76.27%	664	22.13%	48	1.60%
1956	1,876	70.79%	758	28.60%	16	0.60%
1960	1,683	63.39%	960	36.16%	12	0.45%
1964	1,034	39.54%	1,562	59.73%	19	0.73%
1968	1,352	58.23%	767	33.03%	203	8.74%
1972	1,539	68.37%	652	28.96%	60	2.67%
1976	1,016	46.52%	1,106	50.64%	62	2.84%
1980	1,657	67.49%	616	25.09%	182	7.41%
1984	1,779	75.32%	540	22.86%	43	1.82%
1988	1,230	56.58%	887	40.80%	57	2.62%
1992	967	43.60%	565	25.47%	686	30.93%
1996	1,336	68.16%	428	21.84%	196	10.00%
2000	1,420	75.69%	383	20.42%	73	3.89%
2004	1,407	77.39%	382	21.01%	29	1.60%
2008	1,207	79.15%	289	18.95%	29	1.90%
2012	1,209	83.73%	218	15.10%	17	1.18%
2016	1,228	84.46%	162	11.14%	64	4.40%
2020	1,339	88.50%	149	9.85%	25	1.65%
2024	1,205	88.41%	129	9.46%	29	2.13%

Ness County is presently overwhelmingly Republican, although it was won by Jimmy Carter for the Democratic Party as recently as 1976. However, apart from Carter and Lyndon Johnson in 1964, no Democrat since 1940 has reached forty percent of the county's ballots. Since Carter's win, however, Michael Dukakis in 1988 which was during a major drought in the Great Plains, had reached so much as 26 percent of the county's vote. In 2016, Hillary Clinton received less than half even this modest figure. This county was Republican presidential candidate Donald Trump's third strongest in the state in 2024, after Wallace and Sheridan counties, the former of which gave Trump over 90% of the vote.

=== Laws ===
Following amendment to the Kansas Constitution in 1986, the county remained a prohibition, or "dry", county until 2004, when voters approved the sale of alcoholic liquor by the individual drink with a 30 percent food sales requirement.

== Education ==
=== Unified school districts ===
- Western Plains USD 106
- Ness City USD 303

School district office in neighboring county

- La Crosse USD 395

== Communities ==
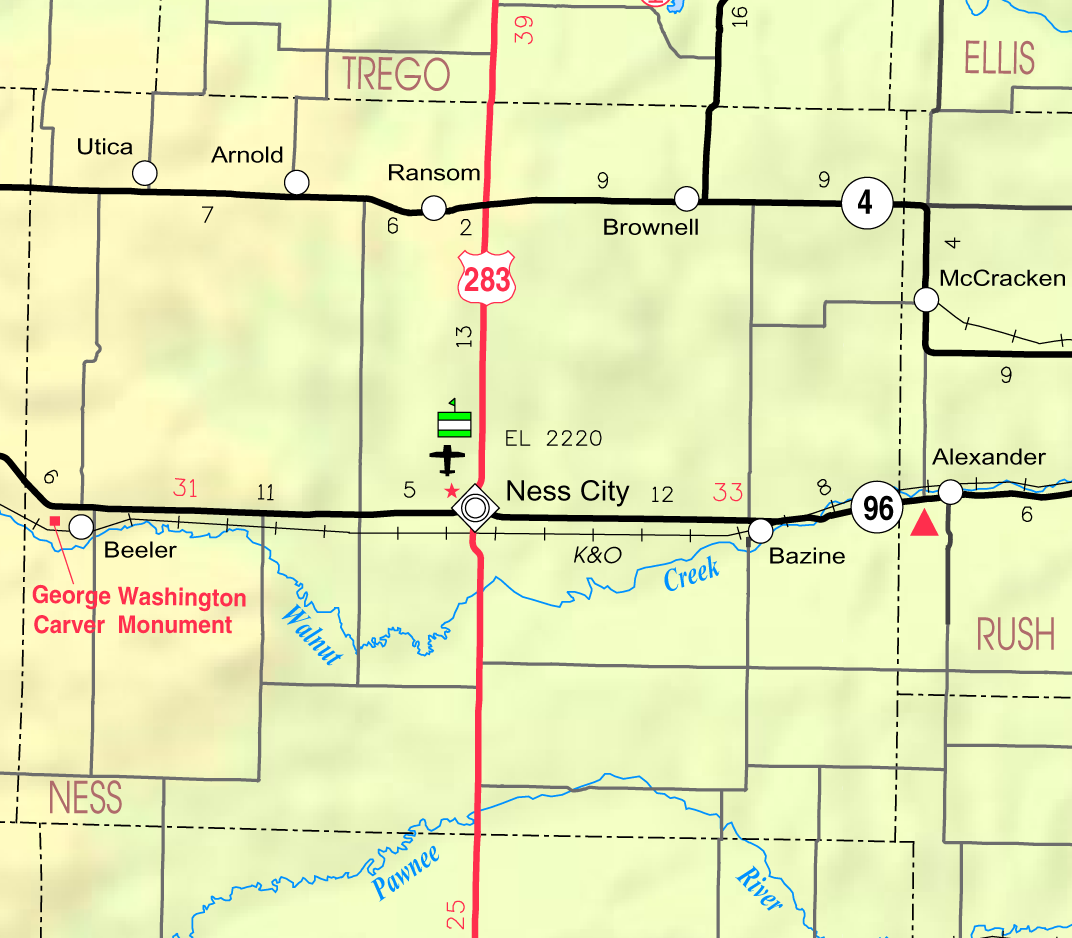
2005 map of Ness County (map legend)

List of townships / incorporated cities / unincorporated communities / extinct former communities within Ness County.

=== Cities ===
- Bazine
- Brownell
- Ness City (county seat)
- Ransom
- Utica

=== Unincorporated communities ===
- Arnold
- Beeler

=== Ghost towns ===
- Nonchalanta

=== Townships ===
Ness County is divided into ten townships. None of the cities within the county are considered governmentally independent, and all figures for the townships include those of the cities. In the following table, the population center is the largest city (or cities) included in that township's population total, if it is of a significant size.

Sources: 2000 U.S. Gazetteer from the U.S. Census Bureau.
Township	FIPS	Population center	Population	Population density /km^{2} (/sq mi)	Land area km^{2} (sq mi)	Water area km^{2} (sq mi)	Water %	Geographic coordinates
Bazine	04800	Bazine	441	1 (4)	312 (120)	0 (0)	0%	38°27′30″N 99°41′15″W
Center	11925	Ness City	1,567	13 (33)	124 (48)	0 (0)	0.01%	38°27′40″N 99°53′45″W
Eden	19775		14	0 (1)	266 (103)	0 (0)	0%	38°28′57″N 100°8′49″W
Forrester	23875		109	1 (1)	206 (80)	0 (0)	0%	38°30′45″N 99°59′28″W
Franklin	24475		132	0 (1)	372 (144)	0 (0)	0.02%	38°21′22″N 99°54′25″W
Highpoint	32100		93	0 (1)	312 (121)	0 (0)	0.08%	38°20′13″N 99°42′26″W
Johnson	35550		76	0 (1)	308 (119)	0 (0)	0.05%	38°18′37″N 100°5′25″W
Nevada	50125	Ransom	479	2 (4)	278 (107)	0 (0)	0.04%	38°37′55″N 99°55′22″W
Ohio	52400	Utica	345	1 (3)	298 (115)	0 (0)	0%	38°38′28″N 100°7′45″W
Waring	75400	Brownell	142	0 (1)	308 (119)	0 (0)	0.03%	38°37′50″N 99°42′56″W

== See also ==
- National Register of Historic Places listings in Ness County, Kansas

Community information for Kansas

- Kansas locations by per capita income
- List of counties in Kansas
- List of townships in Kansas
- List of cities in Kansas
- List of unincorporated communities in Kansas
- List of ghost towns in Kansas
