= Sawlog Township, Kansas =

Sawlog Township Hodgeman County, Kansas
- Township
- Location within Hodgeman County

- Location within Kansas
- Coordinates: 37°57′26″N 099°53′58″W
- Country: United States
- State: Kansas
- County: Hodgeman

Area
  - Total: 72.15 sq mi (186.88 km^{2})
  - Land: 72.14 sq mi (186.85 km^{2})
  - Water: 0.012 sq mi (0.03 km^{2}) 0.02%
- Elevation: 2,451 ft (747 m)

Population (2020)
  - Total: 61
  - Density: 0.85/sq mi (0.33/km^{2})
- Time zone: UTC-6 (CST)
  - Summer (DST): UTC-5 (CDT)
- FIPS code: 20-63225
- GNIS ID: 471634

Sawlog Township is a township in Hodgeman County, Kansas, United States. As of the 2020 census, its population was 61.

== Geography ==
Sawlog Township covers an area of 72.16 square miles (186.9 km^{2}) and contains no incorporated settlements.

== Transportation ==
Sawlog Township contains one airport or landing strip, Jetmore Municipal Airport.
