= Lincoln Township, Pawnee County, Kansas =

Township in Pawnee County, Kansas, U.S.

Lincoln Township
- Township
- Location within Pawnee County
- Coordinates: 38.298579°N 99.409177°W
- Country: United States
- State: Kansas
- County: Pawnee

Government
  - Commissioner, District 2: Brock Miller

Area
  - Total: 36.029 sq mi (93.31 km^{2})
  - Land: 35.987 sq mi (93.21 km^{2})
  - Water: 0.042 sq mi (0.11 km^{2}) 0.12%
- Elevation: 2,247 ft (685 m)

Population (2020)
  - Total: 15
  - Density: 0.42/sq mi (0.16/km^{2})
- Time zone: UTC-6 (CST)
  - Summer (DST): UTC-5 (CDT)
- Area code: 620
- GNIS feature ID: 475715

Lincoln Township is a township in Pawnee County, Kansas, United States. As of the 2020 census, its population was 15.

== History ==
Lincoln Township was established in the 1910s, having been separated from Grant Township.

== Geography ==
Lincoln Township covers an area of 33.515 square miles (86.80 square kilometers).

=== Adjacent townships ===
Union Township, Rush County
Alexander-Belle Prairie Township, Rush County	northwest	north	northeast	Center Township, Rush County
Shiley Township, Pawnee County	west	self	east	Conkling Township, Pawnee County
Browns Grove Township, Pawnee County	southwest	south
Grant Township, Pawnee County
