= Alexander-Belle Prairie Township, Kansas =

Township in Rush County, Kansas, U.S.

Alexander-Belle Prairie Township
- Township
- Location within Rush County
- Coordinates: 38.459045°N 99.529872°W
- Country: United States
- State: Kansas
- County: Rush
- Established: 1970s

Government
  - District 3 County Commissioner: Les Rogers

Area
  - Total: 84.821 sq mi (219.69 km^{2})
  - Land: 84.807 sq mi (219.65 km^{2})
  - Water: 0.014 sq mi (0.036 km^{2}) 0.02%

Population (2020)
  - Total: 76
  - Density: 0.90/sq mi (0.35/km^{2})
- Time zone: UTC-6 (CST)
  - Summer (DST): UTC-5 (CDT)
- Area code: 785
- GNIS feature ID: 475601

Alexander-Belle Prairie Township is a township in Rush County, Kansas, United States. As of the 2020 census, its population was 76.

== History ==
As its name implies, Alexander-Belle Prairie Township was originally two separate townships: Alexander Township and Belle Prairie Township. What was to become Alexander Township was first settled by A. Harvey and J. C. Young in 1872. The township was then established in 1874. In 1878, Hampton Township (now part of Hampton-Fairview Township) was created from part of it, and in 1879, Belle Prairie Township was created from Alexander Township as well. The two townships were merged together in the 1970s to create Alexander-Belle Prairie Township. In addition, part of Alexander Township was given to the newly formed Hampton-Fairview Township as well.

== Geography ==
Alexander-Belle Prairie Township covers an area of 84.821 square miles (219.69 square kilometers).

=== Communities ===
- Alexander

=== Adjacent townships ===
Hampton-Fairview Township, Rush County
| Waring Township, Ness County | northwest | north | northeast | La Crosse-Brookdale Township, Rush County |
| Bazine Township, Ness County | west | self | east | Union Township, Rush County |
| Highpoint Township, Ness County | southwest | south | southeast | Lincoln Township, Pawnee County |
Shiley Township, Pawnee County

== Transportation ==
=== Major highways ===
- K-4
- K-96
