= Grant Township, Pawnee County, Kansas =

Township in Pawnee County, Kansas, U.S.

Grant Township
- Township
- Location within Pawnee County
- Coordinates: 38.218516°N 99.40569°W
- Country: United States
- State: Kansas
- County: Pawnee
- Established: 1880

Government
  - Commissioner, District 2: Brock Miller

Area
  - Total: 35.646 sq mi (92.32 km^{2})
  - Land: 35.631 sq mi (92.28 km^{2})
  - Water: 0.015 sq mi (0.039 km^{2}) 0.04%
- Elevation: 2,090 ft (640 m)

Population (2020)
  - Total: 142
  - Density: 3.99/sq mi (1.54/km^{2})
- Time zone: UTC-6 (CST)
  - Summer (DST): UTC-5 (CDT)
- Area code: 620
- GNIS feature ID: 475717

Grant Township is a township in Pawnee County, Kansas, United States. As of the 2020 census, its population was 142.

== History ==
Grant Township was established in 1880. The area that became Lincoln Township was detached from Grant Township in the 1910s.

== Geography ==
Grant Township covers an area of 35.646 square miles (92.32 square kilometers). The Pawnee River flows through it.

=== Communities ===
- Rozel

=== Adjacent townships ===
- Lincoln Township, Pawnee County (north)
- Conkling Township, Pawnee County (northeast)
- Morton Township, Pawnee County (east)
- Pleasant Ridge Township, Pawnee County (southeast)
- Keysville Township, Pawnee County (south)
- Sawmill Township, Pawnee County (southwest)
- Browns Grove Township, Pawnee County (west)

== Transportation ==
=== Major highways ===
- K-156
