= Nonchalanta, Kansas =

- Ghost town
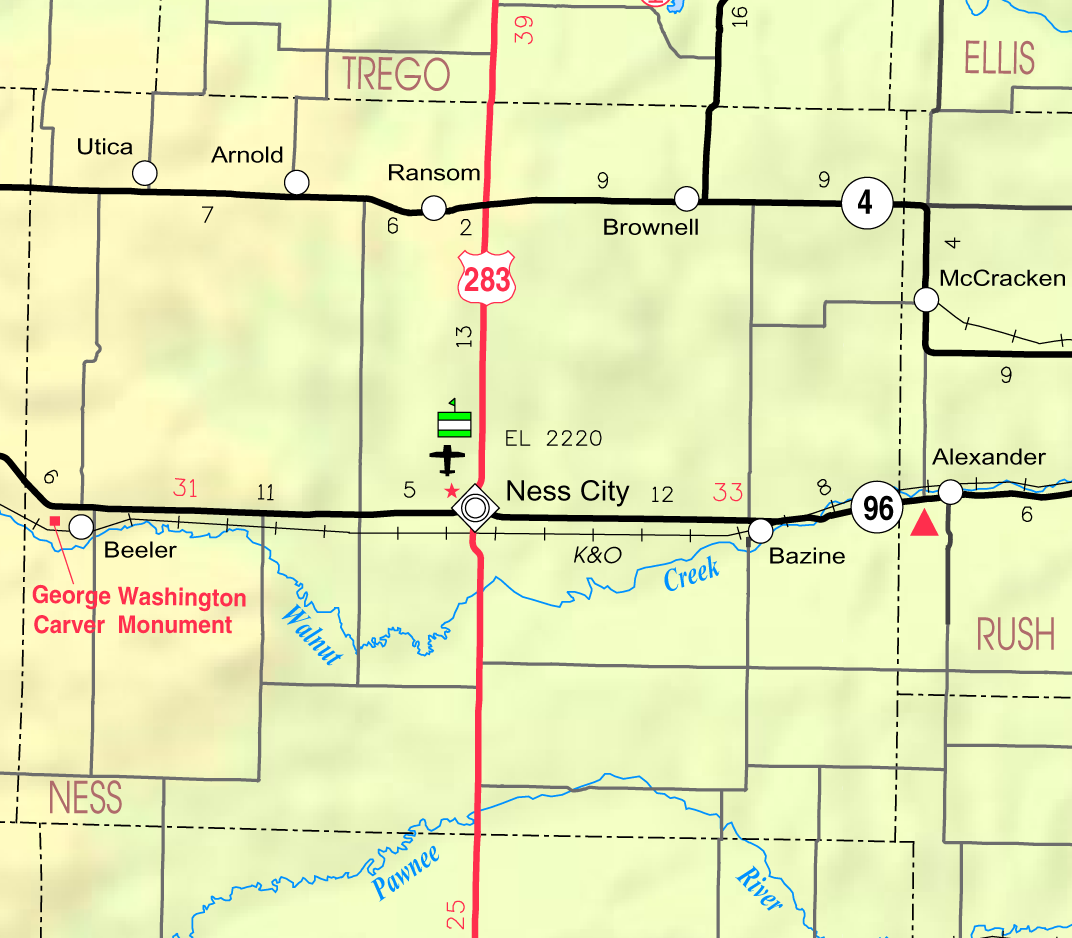
- KDOT map of Ness County (legend)

- Location within the state of Kansas
- Coordinates: 38°17′00″N 100°06′01″W
- Country: United States
- State: Kansas
- County: Ness
- Founded: 1885
- Elevation: 2,405 ft (733 m)

Population
  - Total: 0
- Time zone: UTC-6 (CST)
  - Summer (DST): UTC-5 (CDT)
- Area code: 620
- GNIS ID: 482409

Nonchalanta is a ghost town in Ness County, Kansas, United States. It is located approximately 16 miles (26 km) southwest of Ness City.

== History ==
Like many Kansas ghost towns, Nonchalanta grew and died over a span of just a few years. By 1885, the town was platted and named. Lewis Odom platted the town, and Dr. W.A. Yingling, another local, came up with the name Nonchalanta after the word "nonchalant", and added an extra "a" at the end. Lots went for between $15-85. Settlers arrived via covered wagon with the promise of free land and future railroad expansion through town. A church and a hotel owned by John Rankin Rogers, who later became governor of Washington, were constructed, along with other businesses. Nonchalanta may have had a population of around 300 at its peak. Construction work began on a bank, and in 1887, a nearby post office was renamed from Candish to Nonchalanta. A school was completed by 1888. By 1890, many businesses had left with the cancellation of a planned railroad. The post office formally closed in 1930. Today, the ruins of the old schoolhouse remain on the former site of Nonchalanta, with some of the stones bearing the names of the children who were students at the school. Ruins of other stone structures can also be found at the site.
