= Bazine Township, Kansas =

Township in Ness County, Kansas, U.S.

Bazine Township
- Township
- Location within Ness County
- Coordinates: 38.479881°N 99.695957°W
- Country: United States
- State: Kansas
- County: Ness

Area
  - Total: 120.380 sq mi (311.78 km^{2})
  - Land: 120.379 sq mi (311.78 km^{2})
  - Water: 0.001 sq mi (0.0026 km^{2}) 0%

Population (2020)
  - Total: 394
  - Density: 3.27/sq mi (1.26/km^{2})
- Time zone: UTC-6 (CST)
  - Summer (DST): UTC-5 (CDT)
- Area code: 785

Bazine Township is a township in Ness County, Kansas, United States. As of the 2020 census, its population was 394.

== Geography ==
Bazine Township covers an area of 120.380 square miles (311.78 square kilometers).

=== Communities ===
- Bazine

=== Adjacent townships ===
- Waring Township, Ness County (north)
- Hampton-Fairview Township, Rush County (northeast)
- Alexander-Belle Prairie Township, Rush County (east)
- Highpoint Township, Ness County (south)
- Franklin Township, Ness County (southwest)
- Center Township, Ness County (west)
- Nevada Township, Ness County (northwest)

=== Major highways ===
- K-96
