= Center Township, Ness County, Kansas =

Township in Ness County, Kansas, U.S.

Center Township
- Township
- Location within Ness County
- Coordinates: 38.506671°N 99.860078°W
- Country: United States
- State: Kansas
- County: Ness

Area
  - Total: 47.715 sq mi (123.58 km^{2})
  - Land: 47.708 sq mi (123.56 km^{2})
  - Water: 0.007 sq mi (0.018 km^{2}) 0.01%

Population (2020)
  - Total: 1,340
  - Density: 28.1/sq mi (10.8/km^{2})
- Time zone: UTC-6 (CST)
  - Summer (DST): UTC-5 (CDT)
- Area code: 785

Center Township is a township in Ness County, Kansas, United States. As of the 2020 census, its population was 1,340.

== Geography ==
Center Township covers an area of 47.715 square miles (123.58 square kilometers).

=== Communities ===
- part of Ness City

=== Adjacent townships ===
- Nevada Township, Ness County (north)
- Waring Township, Ness County (northeast)
- Bazine Township, Ness County (east)
- Franklin Township, Ness County (south)
- Forrester Township, Ness County (west)

=== Major highways ===
- US-283
- K-96
