= Eden Township, Ness County, Kansas =

Township in Ness County, Kansas, U.S.

Eden Township
- Township
- Location within Ness County
- Coordinates: 38.477195°N 100.151297°W
- Country: United States
- State: Kansas
- County: Ness

Area
  - Total: 102.834 sq mi (266.34 km^{2})
  - Land: 102.834 sq mi (266.34 km^{2})
  - Water: 0 sq mi (0 km^{2}) 0%

Population (2020)
  - Total: 77
  - Density: 0.75/sq mi (0.29/km^{2})
- Time zone: UTC-6 (CST)
  - Summer (DST): UTC-5 (CDT)
- Area code: 785

Eden Township is a township in Ness County, Kansas, United States. As of the 2020 census, its population was 77.

== Geography ==
Eden Township covers an area of 102.834 square miles (266.34 square kilometers).

=== Communities ===
- Beeler

=== Adjacent townships ===
- Ohio Township, Ness County (north)
- Forrester Township, Ness County (northeast)
- Franklin Township, Ness County (southeast)
- Johnson Township, Ness County (south)
- Alamota Township, Lane County (west)
- White Rock Township, Lane County (northwest)

=== Major highways ===
- K-96
