= Hodgeman County USD 227 =

Public school district in Jetmore, Kansas

Address
- 401 Douglas St. Jetmore, Kansas, 67854; United States
- Coordinates: 38°5′8″N 99°54′12″W

District information
- Type: Public
- Grades: K to 12
- Schools: 2

Other information
- Website: usd227.org

Hodgeman County Middle-High School

Location
- 510 Niederacher Street; Jetmore, (Hodgeman County), Kansas 67110; United States

Information
- Type: Public high school
- Principal: Kari Burkhart
- Staff: 13.30 (FTE)
- Enrollment: 108 (2023-24)
- Student to teacher ratio: 8.12
- Colors: Red and black
- Nickname: Longhorns
- Website: Hodgeman County Middle-High School

Hodgeman County USD 227 is a public unified school district headquartered in Jetmore, Kansas, United States. The district includes the communities of Jetmore, Hanston, and nearby rural areas.

== Schools ==
The school district operates the following schools:

- Hodgeman County Middle School/High School
- Hodgeman County Elementary School

== History ==
In 2011, it absorbed the former Hanston USD 228, which had dissolved.

At some point around 2008 to 2010 era, the district name was changed from Jetmore USD 227 to Hodgeman County USD 227, and at some point its web domain was changed from jetmorek12.org to usd227.org

== See also ==
- Kansas State Department of Education
- Kansas State High School Activities Association
- List of high schools in Kansas
- List of unified school districts in Kansas
