= South Roscoe Township, Kansas =

South Roscoe Township Hodgeman County, Kansas
- Township
- Location within Hodgeman County

- Location within Kansas
- Coordinates: 37°57′26″N 100°7′1″W
- Country: United States
- State: Kansas
- County: Hodgeman

Area
  - Total: 71.34 sq mi (184.76 km^{2})
  - Land: 71.31 sq mi (184.68 km^{2})
  - Water: 0.031 sq mi (0.08 km^{2}) 0.04%
- Elevation: 2,572 ft (784 m)

Population (2020)
  - Total: 50
  - Density: 0.70/sq mi (0.27/km^{2})
- Time zone: UTC-6 (CST)
  - Summer (DST): UTC-5 (CDT)
- FIPS code: 20-66900
- GNIS ID: 471630

South Roscoe Township is a township in Hodgeman County, Kansas, United States. As of the 2020 census, its population was 50.

== Geography ==
South Roscoe Township covers an area of 71.33 square miles (184.7 km^{2}) and contains no incorporated settlements. According to the USGS, it contains one cemetery, Saint Michaels.

The stream of South Fork Buckner Creek runs through this township.
