= Waring Township, Kansas =

Township in Ness County, Kansas, U.S.

Waring Township
- Township
- Location within Ness County
- Coordinates: 38.623342°N 99.680749°W
- Country: United States
- State: Kansas
- County: Ness

Area
  - Total: 118.787 sq mi (307.66 km^{2})
  - Land: 118.756 sq mi (307.58 km^{2})
  - Water: 0.031 sq mi (0.080 km^{2}) 0.03%

Population (2020)
  - Total: 69
  - Density: 0.58/sq mi (0.22/km^{2})
- Time zone: UTC-6 (CST)
  - Summer (DST): UTC-5 (CDT)
- Area code: 785

Waring Township is a township in Ness County, Kansas, United States. As of the 2020 census, its population was 69.

== Geography ==
Waring Township covers an area of 118.787 square miles (307.66 square kilometers).

=== Communities ===
- Brownell

=== Adjacent townships ===
- Ogallah Township, Trego County (north)
- Big Creek Township, Ellis County (northeast)
- Hampton-Fairview Township, Rush County (east)
- Alexander-Belle Prairie Township, Rush County (southeast)
- Bazine Township, Ness County (south)
- Center Township, Ness County (southwest)
- Nevada Township, Ness County (west)
- WaKeeney Township, Trego County (northwest)

=== Major highways ===
- K-4
- K-147
