= Hanston, Kansas =

City in Hodgeman County, Kansas

- City
- Location within Hodgeman County and Kansas

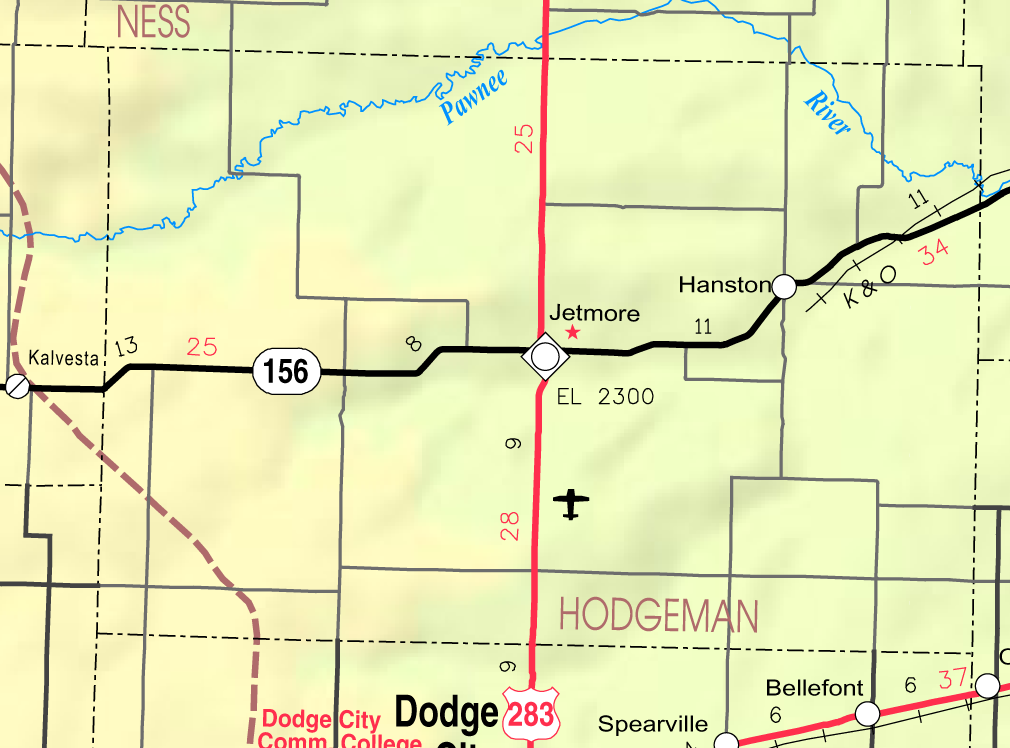
- KDOT map of Hodgeman County (legend)
- Coordinates: 38°07′23″N 99°42′45″W
- Country: United States
- State: Kansas
- County: Hodgeman
- Founded: 1878
- Incorporated: 1929
- Named for: Hann family

Area
  - Total: 0.27 sq mi (0.70 km^{2})
  - Land: 0.27 sq mi (0.70 km^{2})
  - Water: 0 sq mi (0.00 km^{2})
- Elevation: 2,159 ft (658 m)

Population (2020)
  - Total: 259
  - Density: 960/sq mi (370/km^{2})
- Time zone: UTC-6 (CST)
  - Summer (DST): UTC-5 (CDT)
- ZIP Code: 67849
- Area code: 620
- FIPS code: 20-29925
- GNIS ID: 2394292
- Website: City website

Hanston is a city in Hodgeman County, Kansas, United States. As of the 2020 census, the population of the city was 259.

== History ==
Hanston was originally called Marena, and under the latter name was laid out in 1878. It was renamed Hanston in 1902, taking its name from the local Hann family.

Hanston was a station and shipping point on the Atchison, Topeka and Santa Fe Railway.

== Geography ==
Hanston is located along K-156 and the Kansas and Oklahoma Railroad. According to the United States Census Bureau, the city has a total area of 0.28 square miles (0.73 km^{2}), all land.

== Demographics ==
Historical population
Census	Pop.	Note	%±
1930	264		—
1940	251		−4.9%
1950	286		13.9%
1960	279		−2.4%
1970	282		1.1%
1980	257		−8.9%
1990	326		26.8%
2000	259		−20.6%
2010	206		−20.5%
2020	259		25.7%
U.S. Decennial Census

=== 2020 census ===
The 2020 United States census counted 259 people, 92 households, and 67 families in Hanston. The population density was 959.3 per square mile (370.4/km^{2}). There were 109 housing units at an average density of 403.7 per square mile (155.9/km^{2}). The racial makeup was 97.68% (253) white or European American (93.05% non-Hispanic white), 0.0% (0) black or African-American, 0.77% (2) Native American or Alaska Native, 0.0% (0) Asian, 0.0% (0) Pacific Islander or Native Hawaiian, 0.77% (2) from other races, and 0.77% (2) from two or more races. Hispanic or Latino of any race was 6.18% (16) of the population.

Of the 92 households, 37.0% had children under the age of 18; 59.8% were married couples living together; 19.6% had a female householder with no spouse or partner present. 26.1% of households consisted of individuals and 14.1% had someone living alone who was 65 years of age or older. The average household size was 2.8 and the average family size was 2.8. The percent of those with a bachelor's degree or higher was estimated to be 15.8% of the population.

30.5% of the population was under the age of 18, 5.0% from 18 to 24, 22.0% from 25 to 44, 22.4% from 45 to 64, and 20.1% who were 65 years of age or older. The median age was 39.5 years. For every 100 females, there were 91.9 males. For every 100 females ages 18 and older, there were 102.2 males.

The 2016–2020 5-year American Community Survey estimates show that the median household income was $52,083 (with a margin of error of +/- $33,868) and the median family income was $56,250 (+/- $28,212). Males had a median income of $47,500 (+/- $25,722). The median income for those above 16 years old was $26,389 (+/- $8,033). Approximately, 18.6% of families and 30.4% of the population were below the poverty line, including 51.7% of those under the age of 18 and 1.4% of those ages 65 or over.

=== 2010 census ===
As of the census of 2010, there were 206 people, 96 households, and 63 families residing in the city. The population density was 735.7 inhabitants per square mile (284.1/km^{2}). There were 119 housing units at an average density of 425.0 per square mile (164.1/km^{2}). The racial makeup of the city was 95.1% White, 2.4% from other races, and 2.4% from two or more races. Hispanic or Latino of any race were 9.7% of the population.

There were 96 households, of which 21.9% had children under the age of 18 living with them, 54.2% were married couples living together, 7.3% had a female householder with no husband present, 4.2% had a male householder with no wife present, and 34.4% were non-families. 32.3% of all households were made up of individuals, and 11.5% had someone living alone who was 65 years of age or older. The average household size was 2.15 and the average family size was 2.65.

The median age in the city was 50.1 years. 21.8% of residents were under the age of 18; 3.4% were between the ages of 18 and 24; 18% were from 25 to 44; 37.4% were from 45 to 64; and 19.4% were 65 years of age or older. The gender makeup of the city was 47.1% male and 52.9% female.

== Education ==
=== Primary and secondary ===
The community is served by Hodgeman County USD 227 public school district. In 2011 it absorbed the former Hanston USD 228, which had dissolved. The district had two schools but the Elementary school was torn down in 1968:

- Hodgeman County Elementary School
- Hodgeman County Middle/High School

USD 227 Hodgeman County High School is located in Jetmore. The Hodgeman County High School mascot is the Longhorns. Prior to school unification, the Hanston High School mascot was Hanston Elks.

The Hanston Elks won the following Kansas State Championships:

- 8-Man DII Football – 1989, 1990, 1999, 2001, 2002 and 2004
- 1A Boys Basketball – 1978, 1989, 2004 and 2005

=== Library ===
Hanston is served by the Hanston City Library.
