= Benton Township, Hodgeman County, Kansas =

Benton Township Hodgeman County, Kansas
- Township
- Location within Hodgeman County

- Location within Kansas
- Coordinates: 38°02′39″N 100°10′19″W
- Country: United States
- State: Kansas
- County: Hodgeman

Area
  - Total: 35.83 sq mi (92.81 km^{2})
  - Land: 35.79 sq mi (92.69 km^{2})
  - Water: 0.046 sq mi (0.12 km^{2}) 0.13%
- Elevation: 2,602 ft (793 m)

Population (2020)
  - Total: 27
  - Density: 0.75/sq mi (0.29/km^{2})
- Time zone: UTC-6 (CST)
  - Summer (DST): UTC-5 (CDT)
- FIPS code: 20-06225
- GNIS ID: 471576

Benton Township is a township in Hodgeman County, Kansas, United States. As of the 2020 census, its population was 27.

== Geography ==
Benton Township covers an area of 35.84 square miles (92.8 km^{2}) and contains no incorporated settlements.
