= 2012 United States presidential election in Kansas =

- November 6, 2012

Nominee	Mitt Romney	Barack Obama
Party	Republican	Democratic
Home state	Massachusetts	Illinois
Running mate	Paul Ryan	Joe Biden
Electoral vote	6	0
Popular vote	692,634	440,726
Percentage	59.71%	37.99%

Romney
40–50%
50–60%
60–70%
70–80%
80–90%
90–100%
Obama
40–50%
50–60%
60–70%
70–80%
80–90%
90–100%
Tie/No Data
President before election
Barack Obama
Democratic
Elected President
Barack Obama
Democratic

The 2012 United States presidential election in Kansas took place on November 6, 2012, as part of the 2012 United States presidential election in which all 50 states plus the District of Columbia participated. Kansas voters chose six electors to represent them in the Electoral College via a popular vote pitting incumbent Democratic President Barack Obama and his running mate, Vice President Joe Biden, against Republican challenger and former Massachusetts Governor Mitt Romney and his running mate, Congressman Paul Ryan. Romney and Ryan carried the state with 59.59 percent of the popular vote to Obama's and Biden's 38.00 percent, thus winning the state's six electoral votes.

Obama carried only two counties: Douglas, home to Lawrence and the University of Kansas; and Wyandotte, home to Kansas City and the state's largest concentration of nonwhite voters. He lost Crawford County, home to Pittsburg State University, which he won in 2008, making him the first Democrat to win the White House without carrying this county since John F. Kennedy in 1960.

== Caucuses ==
=== Democratic caucuses ===
No major Democratic candidate challenged President Obama for the Democratic nomination in 2012. Obama thus won all 517 votes at the State Convention on June 9 and all 53 delegates.

=== Republican caucuses ===
2012 Kansas Republican presidential caucuses
- March 10, 2012
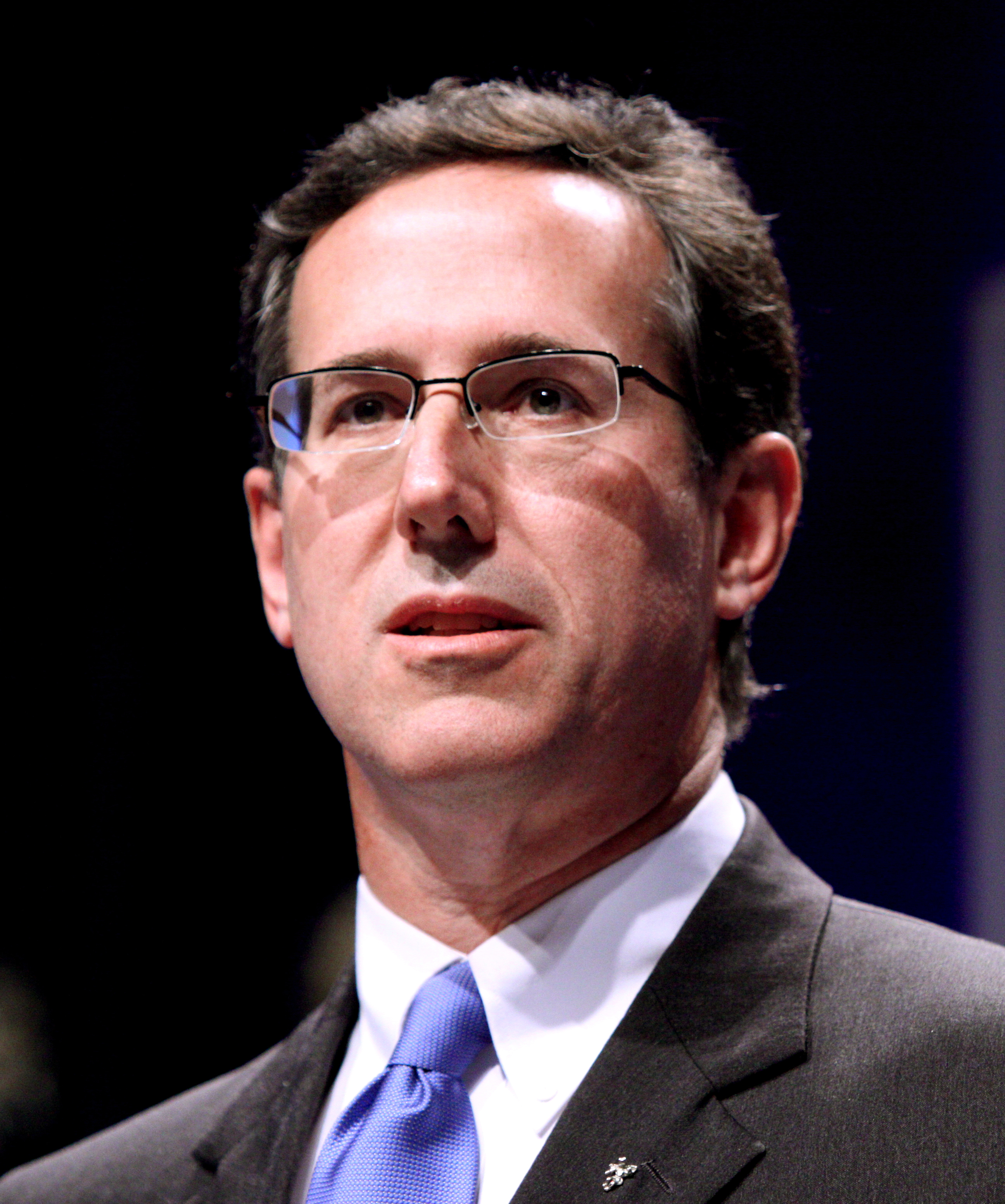

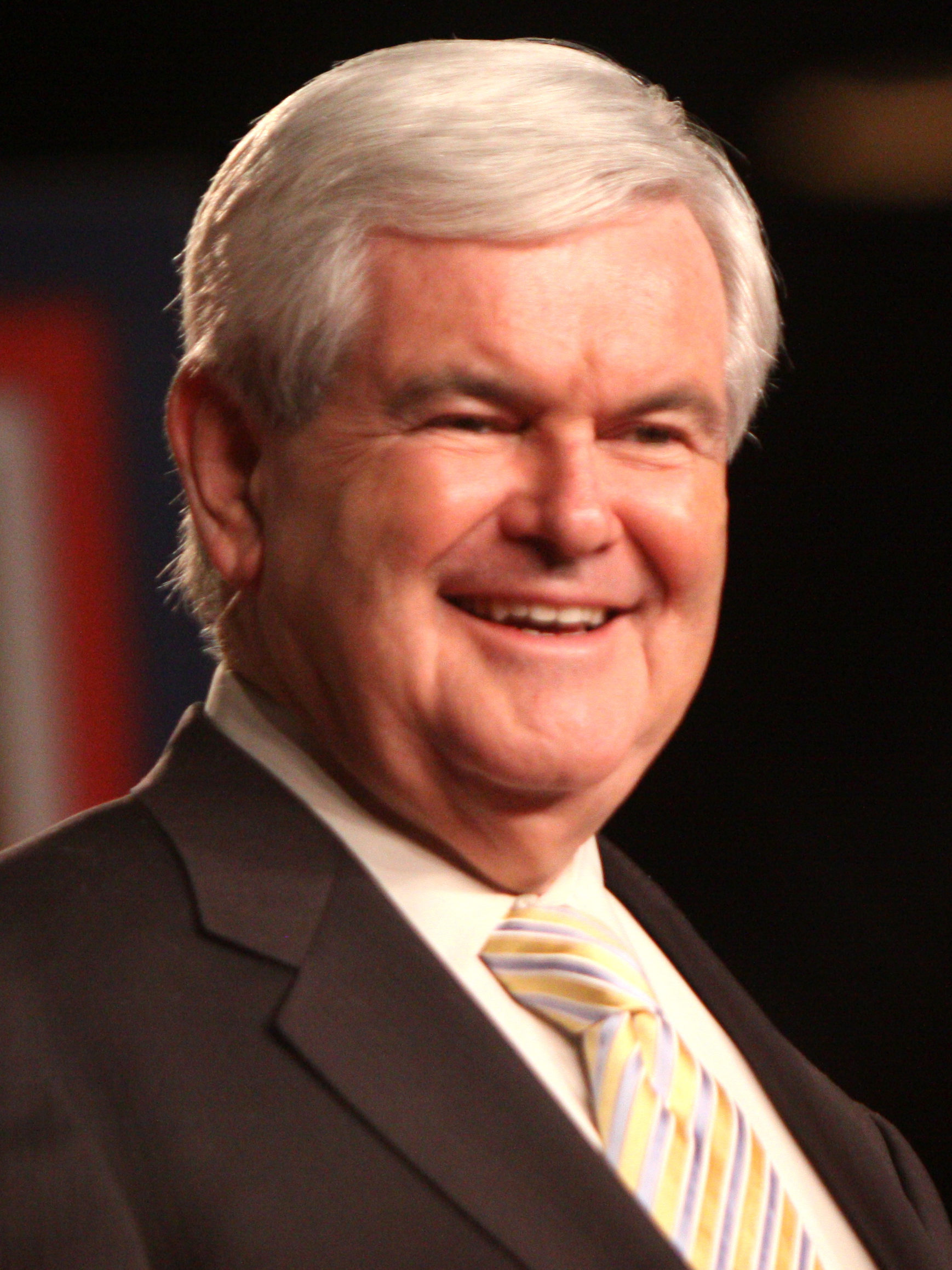

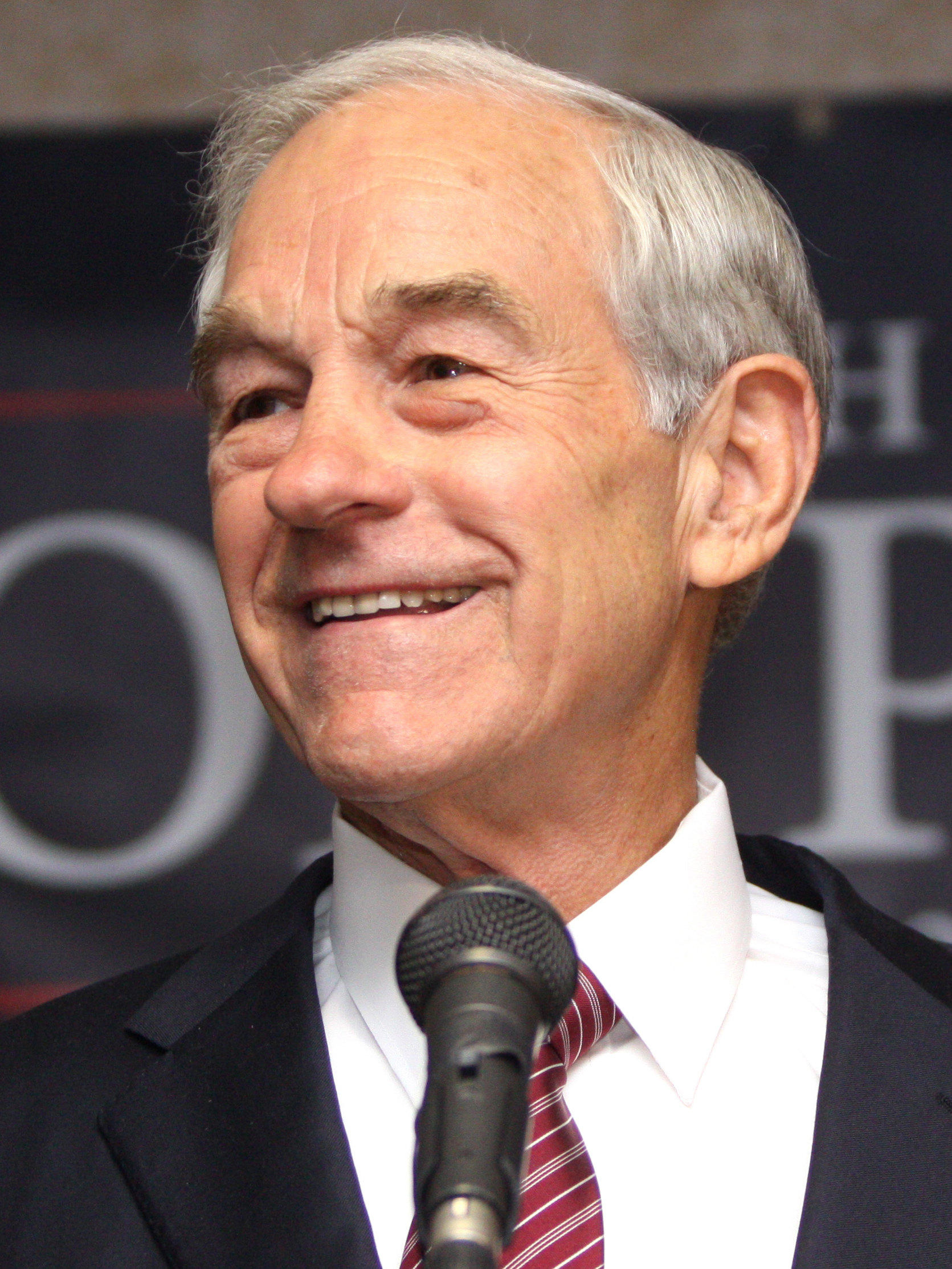
Candidate	Rick Santorum	Mitt Romney
Home state	Pennsylvania	Massachusetts
Delegate count	33	7
Popular vote	15,290	6,250
Percentage	51.2%	20.9%
Candidate	Newt Gingrich	Ron Paul
Home state	Georgia	Texas
Delegate count	0	0
Popular vote	4,297	3,767
Percentage	14.4%	12.6%
- County results Rick Santorum Mitt Romney No votes

The Republican caucuses were held on Saturday, March 10, 2012. Kansas had 40 delegates to the 2012 Republican National Convention. 25 of these delegates were allocated proportionally to candidates who exceeded a 20% threshold in the statewide vote tally. The 15 remaining delegates were 'winner-take-all' delegates. 12 delegates were given (3 each) to the candidates with most votes in each of Kansas's 4 congressional districts. 3 delegates were awarded to the candidate with most votes statewide.

Rick Santorum won the caucus and received 33 delegates. He won the state with 51% of the statewide vote and received most votes in all of the congressional districts, thus winning 15 delegates. As only Santorum and Mitt Romney exceeded the 20% threshold, 18 of the 25 proportionally allocated delegates were allocated to Santorum and 7 to Romney.

2012 Kansas Republican caucuses
Candidate	Votes	Percentage	Delegates
Rick Santorum	15,290	51.2%	33
Mitt Romney	6,250	20.9%	7
Newt Gingrich	4,298	14.4%	0
Ron Paul	3,767	12.6%	0
Uncommitted	122	0.4%	0
Herman Cain	39	0.1%	0
Jon Huntsman	38	0.1%	0
Rick Perry	37	0.1%	0
Michele Bachmann	16	0.1%	0
Totals	29,857	100%	0

Key:	Withdrew prior to contest

== General election ==
=== Predictions ===
Source	Ranking	As of
Huffington Post	Safe R	November 6, 2012
CNN	Safe R	November 6, 2012
New York Times	Safe R	November 6, 2012
Washington Post	Safe R	November 6, 2012
RealClearPolitics	Solid R	November 6, 2012
Sabato's Crystal Ball	Solid R	November 5, 2012
FiveThirtyEight	Solid R	November 6, 2012

=== Results ===
State House district results

2012 United States presidential election in Kansas
Party	Candidate	Running mate	Votes	Percentage	Electoral votes
Republican	Mitt Romney	Paul Ryan	692,634	59.71%	6
Democratic	Barack Obama (incumbent)	Joe Biden (incumbent)	440,726	37.99%	0
Libertarian	Gary Johnson	Jim Gray	20,456	1.76%	0
Reform	Chuck Baldwin	Joseph Martin	5,017	0.43%	0
Green (Write-In)	Jill Stein	Cheri Honkala	714	0.06%	0
Constitution (Write-In)	Virgil Goode	Jim Clymer	187	0.02%	0
Justice (Write-In)	Rocky Anderson	Luis J. Rodriguez	95	0.01%	0
Peace & Freedom (Write-In)	Roseanne Barr	Cindy Sheehan	58	0.01%	0
Other Write-Ins	Other Write-Ins		84	0.01%	0
Totals			1,159,971	100.00%	6

==== By county ====
County	Mitt Romney Republican		Barack Obama Democratic		Gary Johnson Libertarian		Charles Baldwin Reform		Various candidates Other parties		Margin		Total votes cast
County	#	%	#	%	#	%	#	%	#	%	#	%	Total votes cast
Allen	3,316	62.45%	1,869	35.20%	75	1.41%	43	0.81%	7	0.13%	1,447	27.25%	5,310
Anderson	2,276	68.66%	944	28.48%	74	2.23%	18	0.54%	3	0.09%	1,332	40.18%	3,315
Atchison	3,917	58.69%	2,567	38.46%	148	2.22%	35	0.52%	7	0.10%	1,350	20.23%	6,674
Barber	1,772	76.58%	482	20.83%	42	1.82%	16	0.69%	2	0.09%	1,290	55.75%	2,314
Barton	7,874	76.14%	2,297	22.21%	123	1.19%	46	0.44%	1	0.01%	5,577	53.93%	10,341
Bourbon	4,102	65.59%	1,996	31.92%	110	1.76%	40	0.64%	6	0.10%	2,106	33.67%	6,254
Brown	2,829	70.85%	1,076	26.95%	64	1.60%	24	0.60%	0	0.00%	1,753	43.90%	3,993
Butler	18,157	69.61%	7,282	27.92%	459	1.76%	119	0.46%	68	0.26%	10,875	41.69%	26,085
Chase	875	68.84%	358	28.17%	27	2.12%	8	0.63%	3	0.24%	517	40.67%	1,271
Chautauqua	1,304	80.00%	280	17.18%	34	2.09%	12	0.74%	0	0.00%	1,024	62.82%	1,630
Cherokee	5,456	63.66%	2,930	34.19%	145	1.69%	40	0.47%	0	0.00%	2,526	29.47%	8,571
Cheyenne	1,159	81.28%	233	16.34%	25	1.75%	9	0.63%	0	0.00%	926	64.94%	1,426
Clark	805	79.15%	174	17.11%	24	2.36%	14	1.38%	0	0.00%	631	62.04%	1,017
Clay	2,788	75.64%	834	22.63%	45	1.22%	19	0.52%	0	0.00%	1,954	53.01%	3,686
Cloud	2,954	72.79%	974	24.00%	106	2.61%	20	0.49%	4	0.10%	1,980	48.79%	4,058
Coffey	2,903	74.32%	898	22.99%	81	2.07%	20	0.51%	4	0.10%	2,005	51.33%	3,906
Comanche	767	82.65%	143	15.41%	16	1.72%	2	0.22%	0	0.00%	624	67.24%	928
Cowley	8,081	63.58%	4,319	33.98%	225	1.77%	80	0.63%	5	0.04%	3,762	29.60%	12,710
Crawford	7,708	51.25%	6,826	45.39%	320	2.13%	71	0.47%	115	0.76%	882	5.96%	15,040
Decatur	1,218	79.50%	266	17.36%	42	2.74%	6	0.39%	0	0.00%	952	62.14%	1,532
Dickinson	5,832	72.52%	2,020	25.12%	149	1.85%	38	0.47%	3	0.04%	3,812	47.40%	8,042
Doniphan	2,414	70.94%	902	26.51%	63	1.85%	24	0.71%	0	0.00%	1,512	44.43%	3,403
Douglas	17,401	35.91%	29,267	60.39%	1,131	2.33%	162	0.33%	503	1.04%	-11,866	-24.48%	48,464
Edwards	1,059	76.46%	298	21.52%	20	1.44%	8	0.58%	0	0.00%	761	54.94%	1,385
Elk	1,049	76.63%	281	20.53%	32	2.34%	7	0.51%	0	0.00%	768	56.10%	1,369
Ellis	8,399	71.70%	3,057	26.10%	201	1.72%	48	0.41%	9	0.08%	5,342	45.60%	11,714
Ellsworth	1,930	71.17%	702	25.88%	60	2.21%	18	0.66%	2	0.07%	1,228	45.29%	2,712
Finney	6,219	68.46%	2,682	29.52%	138	1.52%	44	0.48%	1	0.01%	3,537	38.94%	9,084
Ford	5,602	66.99%	2,600	31.09%	117	1.40%	43	0.51%	0	0.00%	3,002	35.90%	8,362
Franklin	6,984	63.55%	3,694	33.61%	221	2.01%	85	0.77%	6	0.05%	3,290	29.94%	10,990
Geary	4,372	55.73%	3,332	42.47%	105	1.34%	29	0.37%	7	0.09%	1,040	13.26%	7,845
Gove	1,168	84.45%	176	12.73%	23	1.66%	16	1.16%	0	0.00%	992	71.72%	1,383
Graham	1,056	78.81%	256	19.10%	17	1.27%	10	0.75%	1	0.07%	800	59.71%	1,340
Grant	1,811	78.53%	456	19.77%	25	1.08%	12	0.52%	2	0.09%	1,355	58.76%	2,306
Gray	1,603	81.87%	324	16.55%	23	1.17%	6	0.31%	2	0.10%	1,279	65.32%	1,958
Greeley	543	81.04%	113	16.87%	12	1.79%	2	0.30%	0	0.00%	430	64.17%	670
Greenwood	1,590	74.89%	478	22.52%	43	2.03%	12	0.57%	0	0.00%	1,112	52.37%	2,123
Hamilton	693	79.02%	163	18.59%	17	1.94%	4	0.46%	0	0.00%	530	60.43%	877
Harper	1,759	73.63%	550	23.02%	59	2.47%	17	0.71%	4	0.17%	1,209	50.61%	2,389
Harvey	8,588	60.08%	5,373	37.59%	235	1.64%	68	0.48%	30	0.21%	3,215	22.49%	14,294
Haskell	1,159	83.02%	215	15.40%	18	1.29%	4	0.29%	0	0.00%	944	67.62%	1,396
Hodgeman	868	81.89%	179	16.89%	7	0.66%	6	0.57%	0	0.00%	689	65.00%	1,060
Jackson	3,527	63.42%	1,901	34.18%	106	1.91%	27	0.49%	0	0.00%	1,626	29.24%	5,561
Jefferson	4,827	60.24%	2,977	37.15%	167	2.08%	38	0.47%	4	0.05%	1,850	23.09%	8,013
Jewell	1,235	82.50%	229	15.30%	21	1.40%	12	0.80%	0	0.00%	1,006	67.20%	1,497
Johnson	158,401	57.58%	110,526	40.18%	4,590	1.67%	611	0.22%	946	0.35%	47,875	17.40%	275,074
Kearny	1,097	79.15%	268	19.34%	16	1.15%	5	0.36%	0	0.00%	829	59.81%	1,386
Kingman	2,397	74.19%	733	22.69%	70	2.17%	27	0.84%	4	0.12%	1,664	51.50%	3,231
Kiowa	976	85.31%	163	14.25%	1	0.09%	2	0.17%	2	0.17%	813	71.06%	1,144
Labette	4,742	59.00%	3,117	38.78%	121	1.51%	47	0.58%	10	0.12%	1,625	20.22%	8,037
Lane	739	79.63%	172	18.53%	10	1.08%	7	0.75%	0	0.00%	567	61.10%	928
Leavenworth	17,059	58.65%	11,357	39.05%	494	1.70%	156	0.54%	19	0.07%	5,702	19.60%	29,085
Lincoln	1,165	78.56%	289	19.49%	18	1.21%	11	0.74%	0	0.00%	876	59.07%	1,483
Linn	3,177	71.12%	1,170	26.19%	77	1.72%	40	0.90%	3	0.07%	2,007	44.93%	4,467
Logan	1,126	83.41%	197	14.59%	15	1.11%	12	0.89%	0	0.00%	929	68.82%	1,350
Lyon	6,470	54.48%	5,111	43.04%	226	1.90%	65	0.55%	3	0.03%	1,359	11.44%	11,875
Marion	3,889	71.90%	1,385	25.61%	80	1.48%	52	0.96%	3	0.06%	2,504	46.29%	5,409
Marshall	3,195	66.94%	1,469	30.78%	80	1.68%	29	0.61%	0	0.00%	1,726	36.16%	4,773
McPherson	8,545	69.49%	3,449	28.05%	212	1.72%	72	0.59%	19	0.15%	5,096	41.44%	12,297
Meade	1,428	83.56%	258	15.10%	18	1.05%	5	0.29%	0	0.00%	1,170	68.46%	1,709
Miami	9,858	66.36%	4,712	31.72%	213	1.43%	69	0.46%	4	0.03%	5,146	34.64%	14,856
Mitchell	2,327	78.48%	584	19.70%	16	0.54%	38	1.28%	0	0.00%	1,743	58.78%	2,965
Montgomery	8,630	69.50%	3,501	28.20%	200	1.61%	81	0.65%	5	0.04%	5,129	41.30%	12,417
Morris	1,773	69.20%	718	28.02%	51	1.99%	20	0.78%	0	0.00%	1,055	41.18%	2,562
Morton	1,072	83.88%	189	14.79%	10	0.78%	7	0.55%	0	0.00%	883	69.09%	1,278
Nemaha	3,930	78.19%	1,000	19.90%	54	1.07%	41	0.82%	1	0.02%	2,930	58.29%	5,026
Neosho	4,272	65.93%	2,050	31.64%	102	1.57%	55	0.85%	1	0.02%	2,222	34.29%	6,480
Ness	1,209	83.73%	218	15.10%	12	0.83%	5	0.35%	0	0.00%	991	68.63%	1,444
Norton	1,878	80.77%	398	17.12%	35	1.51%	13	0.56%	1	0.04%	1,480	63.65%	2,325
Osage	4,427	64.10%	2,268	32.84%	167	2.42%	44	0.64%	0	0.00%	2,159	31.26%	6,906
Osborne	1,479	80.47%	324	17.63%	21	1.14%	14	0.76%	0	0.00%	1,155	62.84%	1,838
Ottawa	2,295	78.25%	558	19.02%	65	2.22%	15	0.51%	0	0.00%	1,737	59.23%	2,933
Pawnee	1,836	70.40%	718	27.53%	40	1.53%	13	0.50%	1	0.04%	1,118	42.87%	2,608
Phillips	2,135	83.24%	382	14.89%	36	1.40%	11	0.43%	1	0.04%	1,753	68.35%	2,565
Pottawatomie	6,804	71.78%	2,335	24.63%	193	2.04%	135	1.42%	12	0.13%	4,469	47.15%	9,479
Pratt	2,771	72.90%	980	25.78%	42	1.10%	7	0.18%	1	0.03%	1,791	47.12%	3,801
Rawlins	1,223	84.70%	190	13.16%	27	1.87%	4	0.28%	0	0.00%	1,033	71.54%	1,444
Reno	15,718	64.36%	8,085	33.11%	440	1.80%	156	0.64%	23	0.09%	7,633	31.25%	24,422
Republic	2,134	79.45%	477	17.76%	50	1.86%	25	0.93%	0	0.00%	1,657	61.69%	2,686
Rice	2,676	72.70%	911	24.75%	65	1.77%	29	0.79%	0	0.00%	1,765	47.95%	3,681
Riley	11,507	54.53%	8,977	42.54%	488	2.31%	73	0.35%	56	0.27%	2,530	11.99%	21,101
Rooks	2,038	82.85%	361	14.67%	45	1.83%	15	0.61%	1	0.04%	1,677	68.18%	2,460
Rush	1,166	74.27%	367	23.38%	31	1.97%	6	0.38%	0	0.00%	799	50.89%	1,570
Russell	2,553	79.78%	593	18.53%	33	1.03%	21	0.66%	0	0.00%	1,960	61.25%	3,200
Saline	13,840	64.38%	7,040	32.75%	505	2.35%	96	0.45%	15	0.07%	6,800	31.63%	21,496
Scott	1,728	84.21%	277	13.50%	37	1.80%	10	0.49%	0	0.00%	1,451	70.71%	2,052
Sedgwick	106,506	58.23%	71,977	39.35%	3,521	1.93%	683	0.37%	208	0.11%	34,529	18.88%	182,895
Seward	3,617	69.88%	1,490	28.79%	55	1.06%	14	0.27%	0	0.00%	2,127	41.09%	5,176
Shawnee	37,782	49.38%	36,975	48.33%	1,369	1.79%	321	0.42%	61	0.08%	807	1.05%	76,508
Sheridan	1,154	85.99%	168	12.52%	17	1.27%	3	0.22%	0	0.00%	986	73.47%	1,342
Sherman	1,976	75.33%	577	22.00%	49	1.87%	17	0.65%	4	0.15%	1,399	53.33%	2,623
Smith	1,624	80.28%	358	17.70%	26	1.29%	15	0.74%	0	0.00%	1,266	62.58%	2,023
Stafford	1,385	75.31%	404	21.97%	31	1.69%	17	0.92%	2	0.11%	981	53.34%	1,839
Stanton	605	79.71%	143	18.84%	6	0.79%	5	0.66%	0	0.00%	462	60.87%	759
Stevens	1,749	85.99%	252	12.39%	23	1.13%	10	0.49%	0	0.00%	1,497	73.60%	2,034
Sumner	6,260	68.48%	2,658	29.08%	156	1.71%	59	0.65%	8	0.09%	3,602	39.40%	9,141
Thomas	2,788	80.25%	598	17.21%	68	1.96%	20	0.58%	0	0.00%	2,190	63.04%	3,474
Trego	1,261	79.86%	291	18.43%	19	1.20%	7	0.44%	1	0.06%	970	61.43%	1,579
Wabaunsee	2,256	69.05%	918	28.10%	58	1.78%	35	1.07%	0	0.00%	1,338	40.95%	3,267
Wallace	719	90.10%	68	8.52%	8	1.00%	3	0.38%	0	0.00%	651	81.58%	798
Washington	2,316	80.17%	524	18.14%	38	1.32%	11	0.38%	0	0.00%	1,792	62.03%	2,889
Wichita	821	83.18%	157	15.91%	4	0.41%	5	0.51%	0	0.00%	664	67.27%	987
Wilson	2,825	76.00%	818	22.01%	47	1.26%	27	0.73%	0	0.00%	2,007	53.99%	3,717
Woodson	1,035	71.53%	380	26.26%	21	1.45%	7	0.48%	4	0.28%	655	45.27%	1,447
Wyandotte	15,496	30.45%	34,302	67.40%	692	1.36%	205	0.40%	198	0.38%	-18,806	-36.95%	50,893
Totals	689,809	59.59%	439,908	38.00%	20,409	1.76%	4,990	0.43%	2,416	0.21%	249,901	21.59%	1,157,532

Counties that flipped from Democratic to Republican

- Crawford (largest city: Pittsburg)

==== By congressional district ====
Romney won all four congressional districts.

District	Romney	Obama	Representative
1st	70%	28%	Tim Huelskamp
2nd	55%	42%	Lynn Jenkins
3rd	54%	44%	Kevin Yoder
4th	61%	36%	Mike Pompeo

== See also ==
- United States presidential elections in Kansas
- 2012 Republican Party presidential primaries
- Results of the 2012 Republican Party presidential primaries
- Kansas Republican Party
