= Sterling Township, Hodgeman County, Kansas =

Sterling Township Hodgeman County, Kansas
- Township
- Location within Hodgeman County

- Location within Kansas
- Coordinates: 38°2′30″N 99°41′1″W
- Country: United States
- State: Kansas
- County: Hodgeman

Area
  - Total: 144.24 sq mi (373.58 km^{2})
  - Land: 144.21 sq mi (373.51 km^{2})
  - Water: 0.027 sq mi (0.07 km^{2}) 0.02%
- Elevation: 2,320 ft (710 m)

Population (2020)
  - Total: 99
  - Density: 0.69/sq mi (0.27/km^{2})
- Time zone: UTC-6 (CST)
  - Summer (DST): UTC-5 (CDT)
- FIPS code: 20-68175
- GNIS ID: 473533

Sterling Township is a township in Hodgeman County, Kansas, United States. As of the 2020 census, its population was 99.

== Geography ==
Sterling Township covers an area of 144.24 square miles (373.6 km^{2}) and contains no incorporated settlements.

The streams of Rock Creek and White Woman Creek run through this township. According to the USGS, there is one church and one cemetery, St. Mary's. St. Mary's Parish was dissolved in 1997 and was placed on the National Register of Historic Places in 2016.
