= North Roscoe Township, Kansas =

North Roscoe Township Hodgeman County, Kansas
- Township
- Location within Hodgeman County

- Location within Kansas
- Coordinates: 38°12′30″N 100°08′01″W
- Country: United States
- State: Kansas
- County: Hodgeman

Area
  - Total: 106.44 sq mi (275.68 km^{2})
  - Land: 106.39 sq mi (275.54 km^{2})
  - Water: 0.054 sq mi (0.14 km^{2}) 0.05%
- Elevation: 2,369 ft (722 m)

Population (2020)
  - Total: 31
  - Density: 0.29/sq mi (0.11/km^{2})
- Time zone: UTC-6 (CST)
  - Summer (DST): UTC-5 (CDT)
- FIPS code: 20-51350
- GNIS ID: 471544

North Roscoe Township is a township in Hodgeman County, Kansas, United States. As of the 2020 census, its population was 31.

== Geography ==
North Roscoe Township covers an area of 106.44 square miles (275.7 km^{2}) and contains no incorporated settlements. According to the USGS, it contains one cemetery, "Kidderville".

The streams of Cottonwood Creek, Hackberry Creek, Plum Creek and Sand Creek run through this township.
