= Valley Township, Hodgeman County, Kansas =

Valley Township Hodgeman County, Kansas
- Township
- Location within Hodgeman County

- Location within Kansas
- Coordinates: 38°15′30″N 99°56′1″W
- Country: United States
- State: Kansas
- County: Hodgeman

Area
  - Total: 71.42 sq mi (184.97 km^{2})
  - Land: 71.42 sq mi (184.97 km^{2})
  - Water: 0 sq mi (0 km^{2}) 0%
- Elevation: 2,356 ft (718 m)

Population (2020)
  - Total: 63
  - Density: 0.88/sq mi (0.34/km^{2})
- Time zone: UTC-6 (CST)
  - Summer (DST): UTC-5 (CDT)
- FIPS code: 20-72825
- GNIS ID: 471545

Valley Township is a township in Hodgeman County, Kansas, United States. As of the 2020 census, its population was 63.

== Geography ==
Valley Township covers an area of 71.42 square miles (185.0 km^{2}) and contains no incorporated settlements.

The stream of Cottonwood Creek runs through this township.
