= Marena Township, Kansas =

Marena Township Hodgeman County, Kansas
- Township
- Location within Hodgeman County

- Location within Kansas
- Coordinates: 38°10′29″N 099°41′45″W
- Country: United States
- State: Kansas
- County: Hodgeman

Area
  - Total: 144.14 sq mi (373.33 km^{2})
  - Land: 144.07 sq mi (373.13 km^{2})
  - Water: 0.077 sq mi (0.2 km^{2}) 0.05%
- Elevation: 2,169 ft (661 m)

Population (2020)
  - Total: 384
  - Density: 2.67/sq mi (1.03/km^{2})
- Time zone: UTC-6 (CST)
  - Summer (DST): UTC-5 (CDT)
- FIPS code: 20-44575
- GNIS ID: 475704

Marena Township is a township in Hodgeman County, Kansas, United States. As of the 2020 census, its population was 384.

== Geography ==
Marena Township covers an area of 144.14 square miles (373.3 km^{2}) and contains one incorporated settlement, Hanston. According to the USGS, it contains two cemeteries: Hanston and Saint Anthony.

The streams of Dry Creek, Sand Creek and Saw Log Creek run through this township.
