= White Rock Township, Lane County, Kansas =

Township in Lane County, Kansas, U.S.

White Rock Township
- Township
- Location in Lane County
- Coordinates: 38°37′46″N 100°18′49″W
- Country: United States
- State: Kansas
- County: Lane

Area
  - Total: 80.126 sq mi (207.53 km^{2})
  - Land: 80.113 sq mi (207.49 km^{2})
  - Water: 0.013 sq mi (0.034 km^{2}) 0.02%

Population (2020)
  - Total: 22
  - Density: 0.27/sq mi (0.11/km^{2})
- Time zone: UTC-6 (CST)
  - Summer (DST): UTC-5 (CDT)
- Area code: 620

White Rock Township is a township in Lane County, Kansas, United States. As of the 2020 census, its population was 22.

== Geography ==
White Rock Township covers an area of 80.126 square miles (207.53 square kilometers).

=== Communities ===
- Pendennis

=== Adjacent townships ===
- Jerome Township, Gove County (northwest)
- Larrabee Township, Gove County (northeast)
- Ohio Township, Ness County (east)
- Eden Township, Ness County (southeast)
- Alamota Township, Lane County (south)
- Dighton Township, Lane County (southwest)
- Wilson Township, Lane County (west)

=== Major highways ===
- K-4
