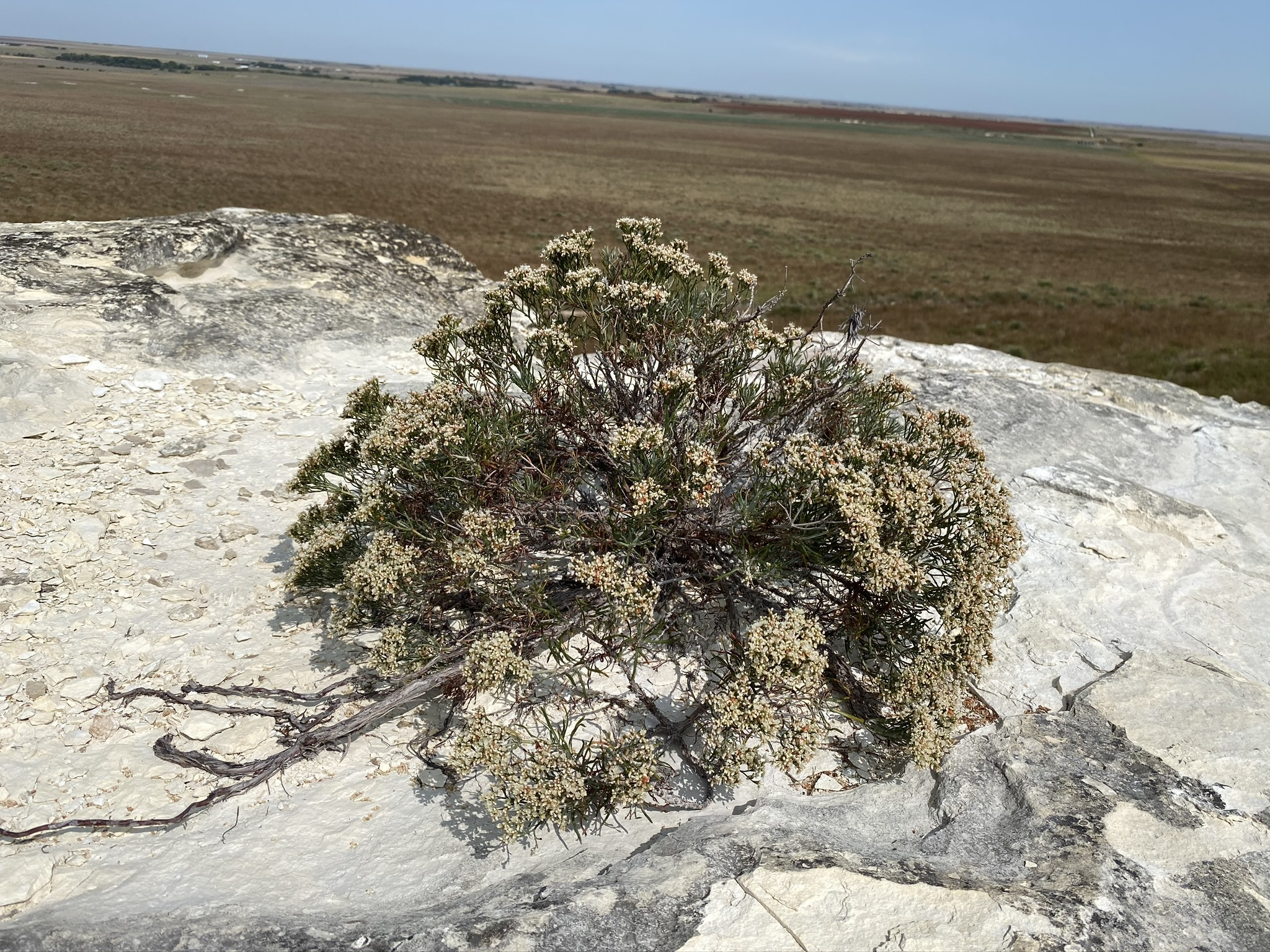

Scientific classification
- Kingdom: Plantae
- Clade: Tracheophytes
- Clade: Angiosperms
- Clade: Eudicots
- Order: Caryophyllales
- Family: Polygonaceae
- Genus: Eriogonum
- Species: E. helichrysoides

Binomial name
- Eriogonum helichrysoides (Gand.) Prain

Synonyms
- Eriogonum effusum subsp. helichrysoides (Gand.) S. Stokes; Eriogonum effusum var. rosmarinoides Benth.; Eriogonum microthecum subsp. helichrysoides Gand.

= Eriogonum helichrysoides =

Species of wild buckwheat

Eriogonum helichrysoides, common names spreading buckwheat and strawflower wild buckwheat, is a plant species endemic to Kansas. It has been reported from only 6 counties in the west-central part of the state: Ellis, Gove, Lane, Logan, Scott, and Trego counties. The species occurs in grasslands or on clay or limestone outcrops.

Eriogonum helichrysoides is a dark green shrub up to 40 cm tall and spreading to up to 80 cm across. Leaves are very narrow, up to 6 cm long but only 3 mm across. Flowers are white to rose.
