= Cheyenne Township, Lane County, Kansas =

Township in Lane County, Kansas, U.S.

Cheyenne Township
- Township
- Location in Lane County
- Coordinates: 38°36′47″N 100°36′53″W
- Country: United States
- State: Kansas
- County: Lane

Area
  - Total: 94.527 sq mi (244.82 km^{2})
  - Land: 94.527 sq mi (244.82 km^{2})
  - Water: 0 sq mi (0 km^{2}) 0%

Population (2020)
  - Total: 269
  - Density: 2.85/sq mi (1.10/km^{2})
- Time zone: UTC-6 (CST)
  - Summer (DST): UTC-5 (CDT)
- Area code: 620

Cheyenne Township is a township in Lane County, Kansas, United States. As of the 2020 census, its population was 269.

== Geography ==
Cheyenne Township covers an area of 94.527 square miles (244.82 square kilometers).

=== Communities ===
- Healy

=== Adjacent townships ===
- Lewis Township, Gove County (northwest)
- Jerome Township, Gove County (northeast)
- Wilson Township, Lane County (east)
- Dighton Township, Lane County (south)
- Keystone Township, Scott County (southwest)
- Michigan Township, Scott County (west)

=== Major highways ===
- K-4
