= Wilson Township, Lane County, Kansas =

Township in Lane County, Kansas, U.S.

Wilson Township
- Township
- Location in Lane County
- Coordinates: 38°37′38″N 100°28′9″W
- Country: United States
- State: Kansas
- County: Lane

Area
  - Total: 79.662 sq mi (206.32 km^{2})
  - Land: 79.5 sq mi (206 km^{2})
  - Water: 0.162 sq mi (0.42 km^{2}) 0.20%

Population (2020)
  - Total: 59
  - Density: 0.74/sq mi (0.29/km^{2})
- Time zone: UTC-6 (CST)
  - Summer (DST): UTC-5 (CDT)
- Area code: 620

Wilson Township is a township in Lane County, Kansas, United States. As of the 2020 census, its population was 59.

== Geography ==
Wilson Township covers an area of 79.662 square miles (206.32 square kilometers).

=== Communities ===
- Shields

=== Adjacent townships ===
- Jerome Township, Gove County (north)
- White Rock Township, Lane County (east)
- Alamota Township, Lane County (southeast)
- Dighton Township, Lane County (south)
- Cheyenne Township, Lane County (west)

=== Major highways ===
- K-4
- K-32
