= Alamota Township, Kansas =

Township in Lane County, Kansas, U.S.

Alamota Township
- Township
- Location in Lane County
- Coordinates: 38°24′28″N 100°19′10″W
- Country: United States
- State: Kansas
- County: Lane

Area
  - Total: 159.826 sq mi (413.95 km^{2})
  - Land: 159.826 sq mi (413.95 km^{2})
  - Water: 0 sq mi (0 km^{2}) 0%

Population (2020)
  - Total: 80
  - Density: 0.50/sq mi (0.19/km^{2})
- Time zone: UTC-6 (CST)
  - Summer (DST): UTC-5 (CDT)
- Area code: 620

Alamota Township is a township in Lane County, Kansas, United States. As of the 2020 census, its population was 80.

== Geography ==
Alamota Township covers an area of 159.826 square miles (413.95 square kilometers).

=== Communities ===
- Alamota

=== Adjacent townships ===
- White Rock Township, Lane County (north)
- Ohio Township, Ness County (northeast)
- Eden Township, Ness County (east)
- Johnson Township, Ness County (southeast)
- Garfield Township, Finney County (south)
- Dighton Township, Lane County (west)
- Wilson Township, Lane County (northwest)

=== Major highways ===
- K-96
