= Dighton Township, Kansas =

Township in Lane County, Kansas, U.S.

Dighton Township
- Township
- Location in Lane County
- Coordinates: 38°24′33″N 100°32′21″W
- Country: United States
- State: Kansas
- County: Lane

Area
  - Total: 303.48 sq mi (786.0 km^{2})
  - Land: 303.443 sq mi (785.91 km^{2})
  - Water: 0.037 sq mi (0.096 km^{2}) 0.01%

Population (2020)
  - Total: 1,144
  - Density: 3.770/sq mi (1.456/km^{2})
- Time zone: UTC-6 (CST)
  - Summer (DST): UTC-5 (CDT)
- Area code: 620

Dighton Township is a township in Lane County, Kansas, United States. As of the 2020 census, its population was 1,144.

== Geography ==
Dighton Township covers an area of 303.47 square miles (786 square kilometers).

=== Communities ===
- Dighton (county seat)
- Amy

=== Adjacent townships ===
- Wilson Township, Lane County (north)
- White Rock Township, Lane County (northeast)
- Alamota Township, Lane County (east)
- Garfield Township, Finney County (south)
- Pleasant Valley Township, Finney County (southwest)
- Lake Township, Scott County (west-southwest)
- Keystone Township, Scott County (west)
- Cheyenne Township, Lane County (northwest)

=== Major highways ===
- K-23
- K-96
