= Jerome, Kansas =

Ghost town in Gove County, Kansas

- Ghost town
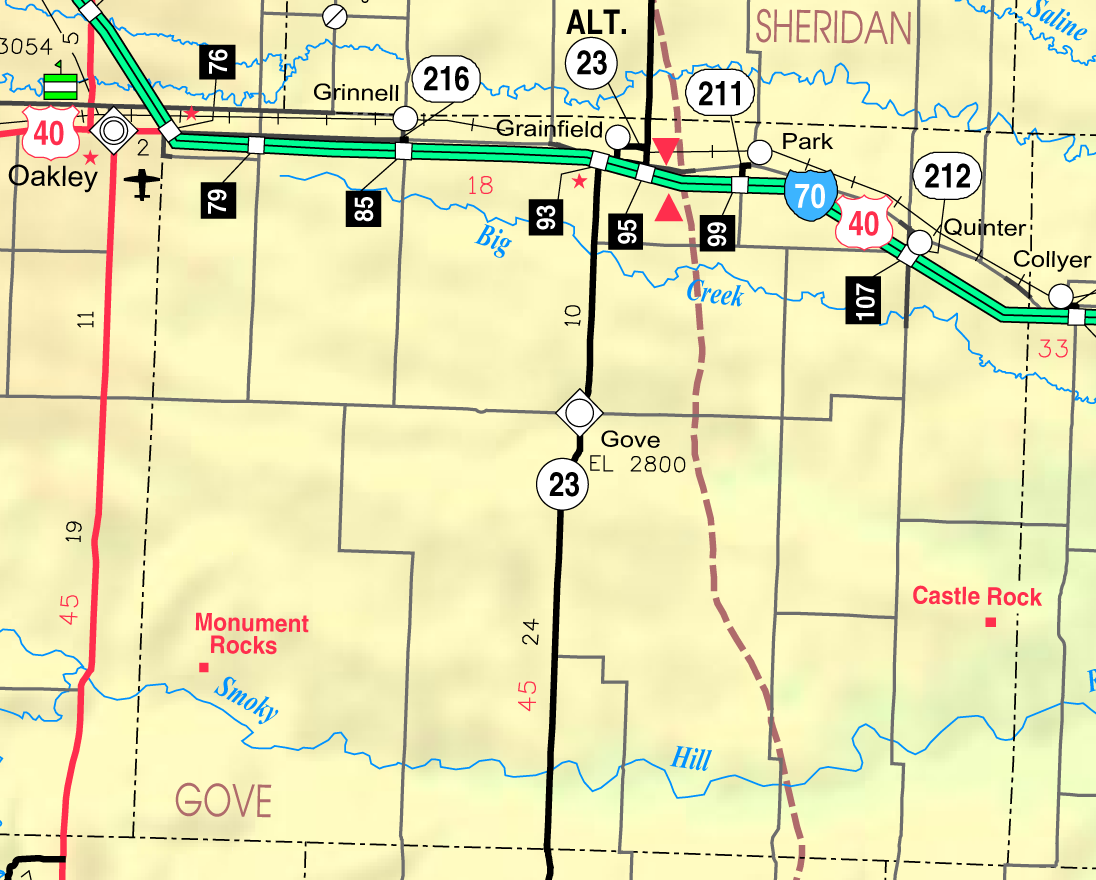
- KDOT map of Gove County (legend)

- Location within Kansas Location within the United States
- Coordinates: 38°44′50″N 100°31′38″W
- Country: United States
- State: Kansas
- County: Gove
- Elevation: 2,510 ft (770 m)

Population
  - Total: 0
- Time zone: UTC-6 (CST)
  - Summer (DST): UTC-5 (CDT)
- Area code: 785
- GNIS ID: 482217

Jerome is a ghost town in Jerome Township, Gove County, Kansas, United States.

== History ==
Jerome was issued a post office in 1886. The post office was discontinued in 1943. Jerome was once a flourishing town with a hotel, a newspaper (the Smoky Hill Globe), several stores, and professionals. By 1910 its population had declined to 12.
