= Hackberry, Kansas =

Ghost town in Gove County, Kansas

- Ghost town
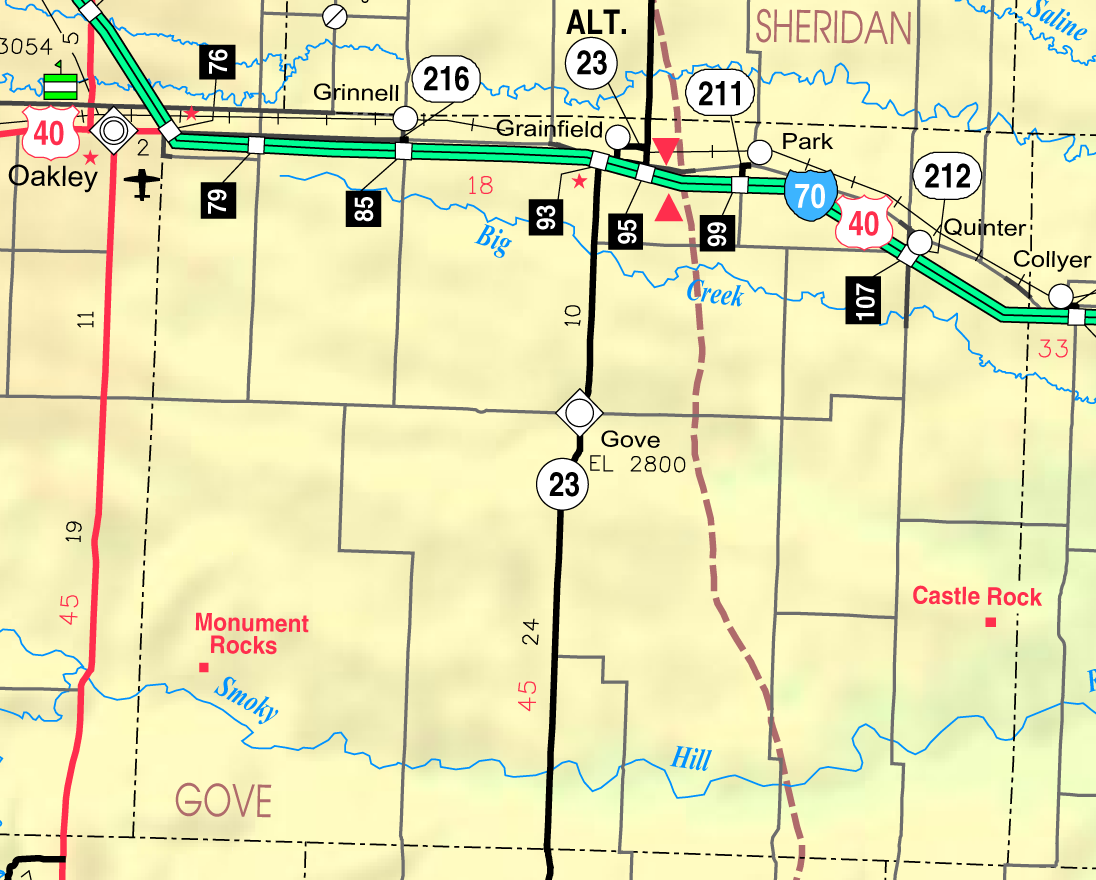
- KDOT map of Gove County (legend)

- Location within Kansas Location within the United States
- Coordinates: 38°59′40″N 100°35′40″W
- Country: United States
- State: Kansas
- County: Gove
- Elevation: 2,749 ft (838 m)

Population
  - Total: 0
- Time zone: UTC-6 (CST)
  - Summer (DST): UTC-5 (CDT)
- Area code: 785
- GNIS ID: 482214

Hackberry is a former country post office located along Hackberry Creek in Gove Township, Gove County, Kansas, United States.

== History ==
The Hackberry Mills, Wallace County, Kansas post office issued in 1879 was moved to Hackberry in 1881. The post office was discontinued in 1888, then reissued from 1898 to 1931.
