= Payne Township =

Payne Township may refer to:

- Payne Township, Gove County, Kansas
- Payne Township, Sedgwick County, Kansas
