= Ohio Township, Ness County, Kansas =

Township in Ness County, Kansas, U.S.

Ohio Township
- Township
- Location within Ness County
- Coordinates: 38.626724°N 100.141516°W
- Country: United States
- State: Kansas
- County: Ness

Area
  - Total: 114.996 sq mi (297.84 km^{2})
  - Land: 114.996 sq mi (297.84 km^{2})
  - Water: 0 sq mi (0 km^{2}) 0%

Population (2020)
  - Total: 165
  - Density: 1.43/sq mi (0.554/km^{2})
- Time zone: UTC-6 (CST)
  - Summer (DST): UTC-5 (CDT)
- Area code: 785

Ohio Township is a township in Ness County, Kansas, United States. As of the 2020 census, its population was 165.

== Geography ==
Ohio Township covers an area of 114.996 square miles (297.84 square kilometers).

=== Communities ===
- Utica
- Arnold

=== Adjacent townships ===
- Collyer Township, Trego County (north)
- Nevada Township, Ness County (east)
- Forrester Township, Ness County (southeast)
- Eden Township, Ness County (south)
- Alamota Township, Lane County (southwest)
- White Rock Township, Lane County (west)
- Larrabee Township, Gove County (northwest)

=== Major highways ===
- K-4
