= Jerome Township =

Jerome Township may refer to the following places in the United States:

- Jerome Township, Gove County, Kansas
- Jerome Township, Michigan
- Jerome Township, Union County, Ohio
