= Alanthus, Kansas =

Ghost town in Gove County, Kansas

- Ghost town
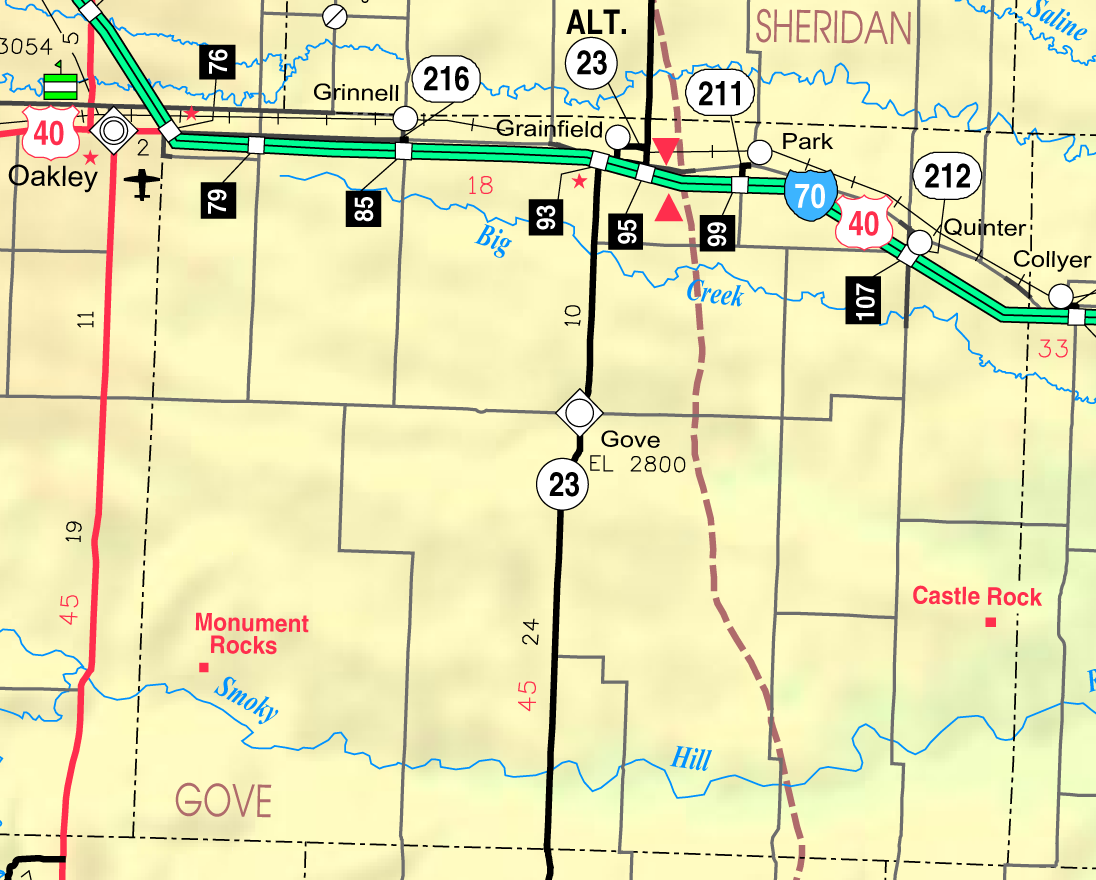
- KDOT map of Gove County (legend)

- Location within Kansas Location within the United States
- Coordinates: 38°42′0″N 100°10′1″W
- Country: United States
- State: Kansas
- County: Gove
- Elevation: 2,507 ft (764 m)

Population
  - Total: 0
- Time zone: UTC-6 (CST)
  - Summer (DST): UTC-5 (CDT)
- Area code: 785
- FIPS code: 20-00790
- GNIS ID: 484959

Alanthus is a former post village in southern Larrabee Township, Gove County, Kansas, United States.

== History ==
Alanthus was issued a post office in 1887. The post office was discontinued in 1917.
