= 1992 United States presidential election in Kansas =

- November 3, 1992
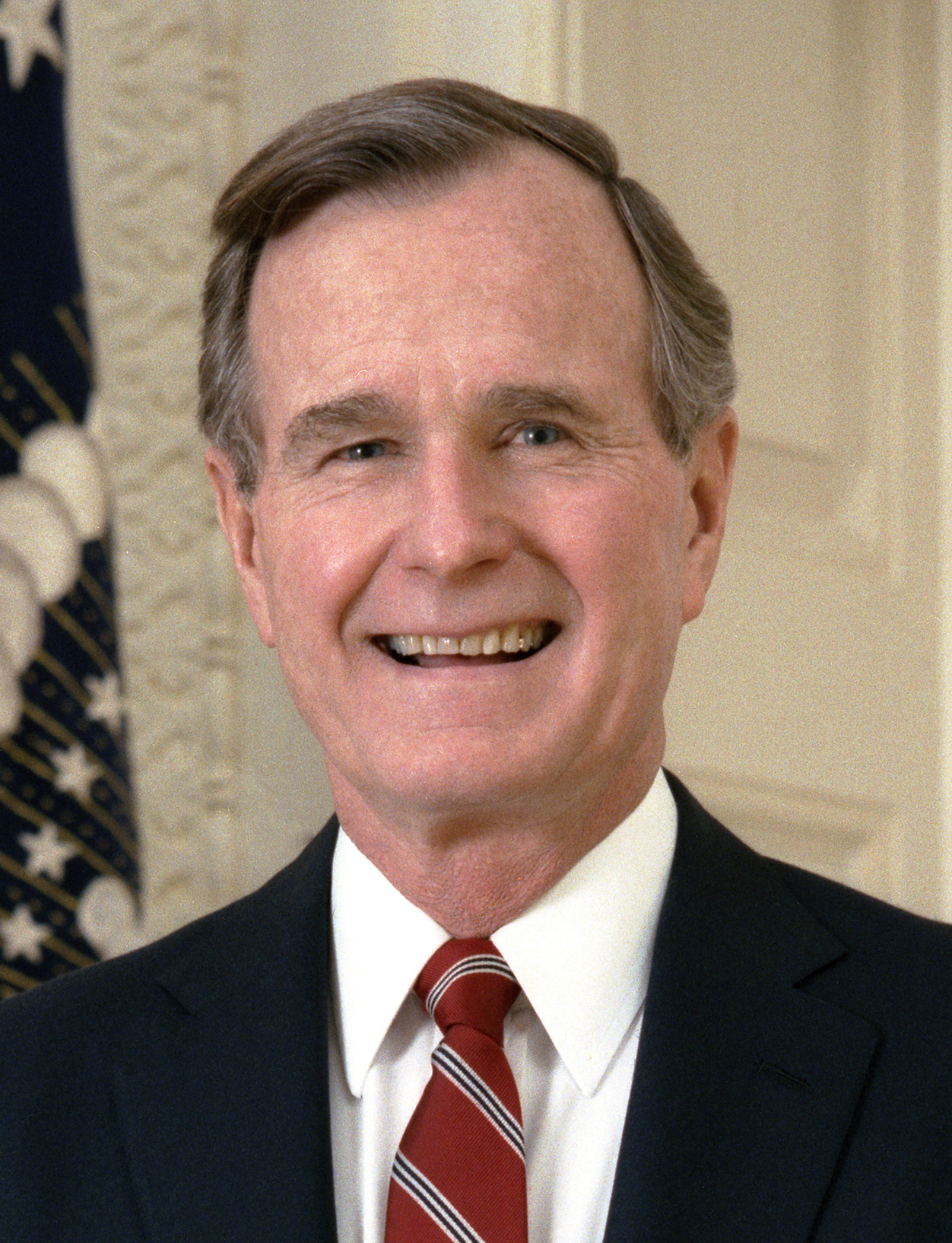

Nominee	George H. W. Bush	Bill Clinton	Ross Perot
Party	Republican	Democratic	Independent
Home state	Texas	Arkansas	Texas
Running mate	Dan Quayle	Al Gore	James Stockdale
Electoral vote	6	0	0
Popular vote	446,951	390,434	312,358
Percentage	38.88%	33.74%	26.99%
County results
Bush
30–40%
40–50%
50–60%
60–70%
Clinton
30–40%
40–50%
50–60%
Perot
30–40%
Tie
34.43% Bush & Perot
President before election
George H. W. Bush
Republican
Elected President
Bill Clinton
Democratic

The 1992 United States presidential election in Kansas took place on November 3, 1992, as part of the 1992 United States presidential election. Voters chose six representatives, or electors to the Electoral College, who voted for president and vice president.

Kansas was won by incumbent President George H. W. Bush (R-Texas) with 38.88% of the popular vote over Governor Bill Clinton (D-Arkansas) with 33.74%. Businessman Ross Perot (I-Texas) finished in third, with 26.99% of the popular vote. Kansas was surprisingly close, likely because Ross Perot split the vote. Had Clinton won in Kansas, it would have been a major upset victory. Notably, ABC News called Kansas for Clinton incorrectly before rescinding the call. Clinton ultimately won the national vote, defeating incumbent President Bush and Perot. As of the 2024 presidential election, this is the last election in which Kansas was decided by single digits and the last time that Ellis County, Cherokee County, Leavenworth County, Labette County, and Miami County voted for a Democratic presidential candidate, as well as the last election in which Wabaunsee County, Anderson County, Jefferson County, and Morris County (the four counties Perot either won or tied in) did not support the Republican candidate. This is the closest the Democrats have come since 1964 to winning Kansas.

With 26.99% of the popular vote, Kansas would prove to be Perot's fifth-strongest state after Maine, Alaska, Utah and Idaho. Perot took third in the state overall but defeated Clinton or Bush for second place in 63 of Kansas's 105 counties.

== Results ==
1992 United States presidential election in Kansas
Party	Candidate	Votes	Percentage	Electoral votes
Republican	George H. W. Bush (incumbent)	449,951	38.88%	6
Democratic	Bill Clinton	390,434	33.74%	0
Independent	Ross Perot	312,358	26.99%	0
Libertarian	Andre Marrou	4,314	0.37%	0
N/A	Other	199	0.02%	0
Totals		1,157,256	100.0%	6

=== Results by county ===
County	George H.W. Bush Republican		Bill Clinton Democratic		Ross Perot Independent		Various candidates Other parties		Margin		Total votes cast
County	#	%	#	%	#	%	#	%	#	%	Total votes cast
Allen	2,351	36.56%	2,312	35.96%	1,746	27.15%	21	0.33%	39	0.60%	6,430
Anderson	1,218	33.03%	1,178	31.95%	1,282	34.77%	9	0.24%	-64	-1.74%	3,687
Atchison	2,521	33.48%	2,959	39.30%	2,020	26.83%	30	0.40%	-438	-5.82%	7,530
Barber	1,225	42.52%	759	26.35%	893	31.00%	4	0.14%	332	11.52%	2,881
Barton	5,113	37.65%	3,846	28.32%	4,574	33.68%	49	0.36%	539	3.97%	13,582
Bourbon	2,876	40.17%	2,509	35.05%	1,763	24.63%	11	0.15%	367	5.12%	7,159
Brown	2,203	41.61%	1,476	27.88%	1,603	30.28%	12	0.23%	600	11.33%	5,294
Butler	9,166	38.79%	7,029	29.75%	7,355	31.13%	79	0.33%	1,811	7.66%	23,629
Chase	610	36.20%	470	27.89%	600	35.61%	5	0.30%	10	0.59%	1,685
Chautauqua	853	41.15%	598	28.85%	607	29.28%	15	0.72%	246	11.87%	2,073
Cherokee	3,589	36.78%	4,083	41.85%	2,067	21.18%	18	0.18%	-494	-5.07%	9,757
Cheyenne	863	49.17%	407	23.19%	477	27.18%	8	0.46%	386	21.99%	1,755
Clark	676	51.49%	293	22.32%	341	25.97%	3	0.23%	335	25.52%	1,313
Clay	2,198	47.89%	947	20.63%	1,434	31.24%	11	0.24%	764	16.65%	4,590
Cloud	2,131	39.12%	1,720	31.57%	1,578	28.96%	19	0.35%	411	7.55%	5,448
Coffey	1,824	42.44%	1,021	23.76%	1,443	33.57%	10	0.23%	381	8.87%	4,298
Comanche	636	49.49%	325	25.29%	324	25.21%	0	0.00%	311	24.20%	1,285
Cowley	5,422	34.35%	5,405	34.24%	4,911	31.11%	46	0.29%	17	0.11%	15,784
Crawford	5,468	32.96%	7,366	44.40%	3,706	22.34%	51	0.31%	-1,898	-11.44%	16,591
Decatur	940	45.00%	576	27.57%	565	27.05%	8	0.38%	364	17.43%	2,089
Dickinson	3,851	41.76%	2,518	27.31%	2,833	30.72%	19	0.21%	1,018	11.04%	9,221
Doniphan	1,579	39.74%	1,177	29.62%	1,200	30.20%	17	0.43%	379	9.54%	3,973
Douglas	12,949	30.64%	19,439	45.99%	9,630	22.78%	247	0.58%	-6,490	-15.35%	42,265
Edwards	769	39.95%	567	29.45%	584	30.34%	5	0.26%	185	9.61%	1,925
Elk	748	42.94%	485	27.84%	503	28.87%	6	0.34%	245	14.07%	1,742
Ellis	3,985	32.00%	4,544	36.49%	3,887	31.21%	37	0.30%	-559	-4.49%	12,453
Ellsworth	1,197	36.96%	1,010	31.18%	1,020	31.49%	12	0.37%	177	5.47%	3,239
Finney	5,278	48.28%	2,612	23.89%	3,011	27.54%	32	0.29%	2,267	20.74%	10,933
Ford	4,342	41.93%	2,635	25.44%	3,341	32.26%	38	0.37%	1,001	9.67%	10,356
Franklin	3,699	37.43%	2,968	30.03%	3,184	32.22%	32	0.32%	515	5.21%	9,883
Geary	2,928	38.75%	2,559	33.87%	2,057	27.22%	12	0.16%	369	4.88%	7,556
Gove	792	46.42%	379	22.22%	532	31.18%	3	0.18%	260	15.24%	1,706
Graham	752	39.33%	554	28.97%	603	31.54%	3	0.16%	149	7.79%	1,912
Grant	1,561	51.71%	619	20.50%	835	27.66%	4	0.13%	726	24.05%	3,019
Gray	1,039	47.81%	443	20.39%	686	31.57%	5	0.23%	353	16.24%	2,173
Greeley	504	57.73%	191	21.88%	175	20.05%	3	0.34%	313	35.85%	873
Greenwood	1,411	36.62%	1,262	32.75%	1,167	30.29%	13	0.34%	149	3.87%	3,853
Hamilton	716	51.96%	386	28.01%	271	19.67%	5	0.36%	330	23.95%	1,378
Harper	1,371	40.59%	845	25.01%	1,151	34.07%	11	0.33%	220	6.52%	3,378
Harvey	6,259	41.71%	5,047	33.63%	3,653	24.34%	47	0.31%	1,212	8.08%	15,006
Haskell	1,023	56.02%	336	18.40%	462	25.30%	5	0.27%	561	30.72%	1,826
Hodgeman	625	50.85%	258	20.99%	343	27.91%	3	0.24%	282	22.94%	1,229
Jackson	1,970	35.48%	1,639	29.52%	1,927	34.71%	16	0.29%	43	0.77%	5,552
Jefferson	2,569	33.02%	2,538	32.62%	2,642	33.96%	31	0.40%	-73	-0.94%	7,780
Jewell	1,050	45.65%	546	23.74%	698	30.35%	6	0.26%	352	15.30%	2,300
Johnson	85,418	43.83%	59,573	30.57%	49,136	25.22%	739	0.38%	25,845	13.26%	194,866
Kearny	943	55.18%	384	22.47%	376	22.00%	6	0.35%	559	32.71%	1,709
Kingman	1,680	40.36%	1,100	26.42%	1,370	32.91%	13	0.31%	310	7.45%	4,163
Kiowa	1,057	55.90%	355	18.77%	475	25.12%	4	0.21%	582	30.78%	1,891
Labette	3,368	33.09%	4,196	41.23%	2,577	25.32%	36	0.35%	-828	-8.14%	10,177
Lane	674	51.89%	265	20.40%	356	27.41%	4	0.31%	318	24.48%	1,299
Leavenworth	7,738	33.39%	8,077	34.86%	7,306	31.53%	51	0.22%	-339	-1.47%	23,172
Lincoln	893	41.11%	612	28.18%	657	30.25%	10	0.46%	236	10.86%	2,172
Linn	1,413	34.20%	1,353	32.75%	1,358	32.87%	7	0.17%	55	1.33%	4,131
Logan	905	52.95%	355	20.77%	446	26.10%	3	0.18%	459	26.85%	1,709
Lyon	5,090	34.73%	4,811	32.83%	4,717	32.18%	38	0.26%	279	1.90%	14,656
McPherson	5,745	44.22%	3,645	28.06%	3,561	27.41%	40	0.31%	2,100	16.16%	12,991
Marion	3,142	49.47%	1,627	25.62%	1,557	24.52%	25	0.39%	1,515	23.85%	6,351
Marshall	2,030	34.65%	2,022	34.52%	1,786	30.49%	20	0.34%	8	0.13%	5,858
Meade	1,135	52.45%	430	19.87%	592	27.36%	7	0.32%	543	25.09%	2,164
Miami	3,528	31.80%	3,835	34.56%	3,701	33.35%	32	0.29%	134	1.21%	11,096
Mitchell	1,601	43.86%	938	25.70%	1,098	30.08%	13	0.36%	503	13.78%	3,650
Montgomery	6,848	43.04%	5,453	34.27%	3,570	22.44%	41	0.26%	1,395	8.77%	15,912
Morris	1,071	34.43%	957	30.76%	1,071	34.43%	12	0.39%	0	0.00%	3,111
Morton	915	54.79%	398	23.83%	350	20.96%	7	0.42%	517	30.96%	1,670
Nemaha	2,220	39.51%	1,580	28.12%	1,804	32.11%	15	0.27%	416	7.40%	5,619
Neosho	2,926	37.07%	2,799	35.46%	2,136	27.06%	32	0.41%	127	1.61%	7,893
Ness	967	43.60%	565	25.47%	678	30.57%	8	0.36%	289	13.03%	2,218
Norton	1,469	47.88%	779	25.39%	815	26.56%	5	0.16%	654	21.32%	3,068
Osage	2,561	34.51%	2,297	30.95%	2,532	34.12%	31	0.42%	29	0.39%	7,421
Osborne	1,003	38.47%	779	29.88%	819	31.42%	6	0.23%	184	7.05%	2,607
Ottawa	1,284	45.53%	764	27.09%	762	27.02%	10	0.35%	520	18.44%	2,820
Pawnee	1,357	37.85%	1,118	31.19%	1,097	30.60%	13	0.36%	239	6.66%	3,585
Phillips	1,579	46.61%	843	24.88%	955	28.19%	11	0.32%	624	18.42%	3,388
Pottawatomie	3,106	38.87%	2,099	26.27%	2,759	34.53%	26	0.33%	347	4.34%	7,990
Pratt	1,779	37.17%	1,466	30.63%	1,528	31.93%	13	0.27%	251	5.24%	4,786
Rawlins	1,023	52.87%	393	20.31%	517	26.72%	2	0.10%	506	26.15%	1,935
Reno	11,377	40.10%	9,257	32.63%	7,636	26.91%	102	0.36%	2,120	7.47%	28,372
Republic	1,767	46.43%	939	24.67%	1,084	28.48%	16	0.42%	683	17.95%	3,806
Rice	2,158	40.94%	1,555	29.50%	1,543	29.27%	15	0.28%	603	11.44%	5,271
Riley	8,394	38.51%	7,933	36.39%	5,387	24.71%	83	0.38%	461	2.12%	21,797
Rooks	1,249	40.42%	771	24.95%	1,063	34.40%	7	0.23%	186	6.02%	3,090
Rush	756	35.74%	689	32.58%	665	31.44%	5	0.24%	67	3.16%	2,115
Russell	1,434	35.72%	1,178	29.34%	1,395	34.74%	8	0.20%	39	0.98%	4,015
Saline	8,565	36.26%	7,890	33.40%	7,108	30.09%	60	0.25%	675	2.86%	23,623
Scott	1,426	56.27%	480	18.94%	621	24.51%	7	0.28%	805	31.76%	2,534
Sedgwick	75,577	40.53%	62,670	33.61%	47,238	25.33%	990	0.53%	12,907	6.92%	186,475
Seward	3,477	51.09%	1,488	21.86%	1,818	26.71%	23	0.34%	1,659	24.38%	6,806
Shawnee	29,344	35.66%	31,972	38.86%	20,653	25.10%	315	0.38%	-2,628	-3.20%	82,284
Sheridan	739	45.17%	347	21.21%	546	33.37%	4	0.24%	193	11.80%	1,636
Sherman	1,630	49.73%	810	24.71%	828	25.26%	10	0.31%	802	24.47%	3,278
Smith	1,236	43.34%	789	27.66%	816	28.61%	11	0.39%	420	14.73%	2,852
Stafford	1,064	38.55%	777	28.15%	910	32.97%	9	0.33%	154	5.58%	2,760
Stanton	556	55.71%	224	22.44%	214	21.44%	4	0.40%	332	33.27%	998
Stevens	1,408	56.84%	390	15.74%	674	27.21%	5	0.20%	734	29.63%	2,477
Sumner	4,087	35.27%	3,564	30.76%	3,887	33.54%	50	0.43%	200	1.73%	11,588
Thomas	1,849	47.14%	932	23.76%	1,129	28.79%	12	0.31%	720	18.35%	3,922
Trego	727	38.02%	608	31.80%	574	30.02%	3	0.16%	119	6.22%	1,912
Wabaunsee	1,254	37.17%	851	25.22%	1,258	37.29%	11	0.33%	-4	-0.12%	3,374
Wallace	679	63.70%	164	15.38%	219	20.54%	4	0.38%	460	43.16%	1,066
Washington	1,740	47.00%	893	24.12%	1,054	28.47%	15	0.41%	686	18.53%	3,702
Wichita	681	55.37%	241	19.59%	303	24.63%	5	0.41%	378	30.74%	1,230
Wilson	1,925	41.53%	1,331	28.72%	1,365	29.45%	14	0.30%	560	12.08%	4,635
Woodson	662	35.48%	590	31.62%	604	32.37%	10	0.54%	58	3.11%	1,866
Wyandotte	12,872	21.06%	34,397	56.27%	13,620	22.28%	235	0.38%	20,777	33.99%	61,124
Totals	449,951	38.88%	390,434	33.74%	312,358	26.99%	4,493	0.39%	59,517	5.14%	1,157,236

==== Counties that flipped from Republican to Democratic ====
- Atchison (largest city: Atchison)
- Cherokee (largest city: Baxter Springs)
- Douglas (largest city: Lawrence)
- Labette (largest city: Parsons)
- Leavenworth (largest city: Leavenworth)
- Miami (largest city: Paola)
- Shawnee (largest city: Topkea)

==== Counties that flipped from Republican to Independent ====
- Anderson (largest city: Garnett)
- Jefferson (largest city: Valley Falls)
- Morris (Tied) (largest city: Council Grove)
- Wabaunsee (largest city: Alma)

== See also ==
- United States presidential elections in Kansas
- Presidency of Bill Clinton
