= Lane County, Kansas =

County in Kansas, United States

- County
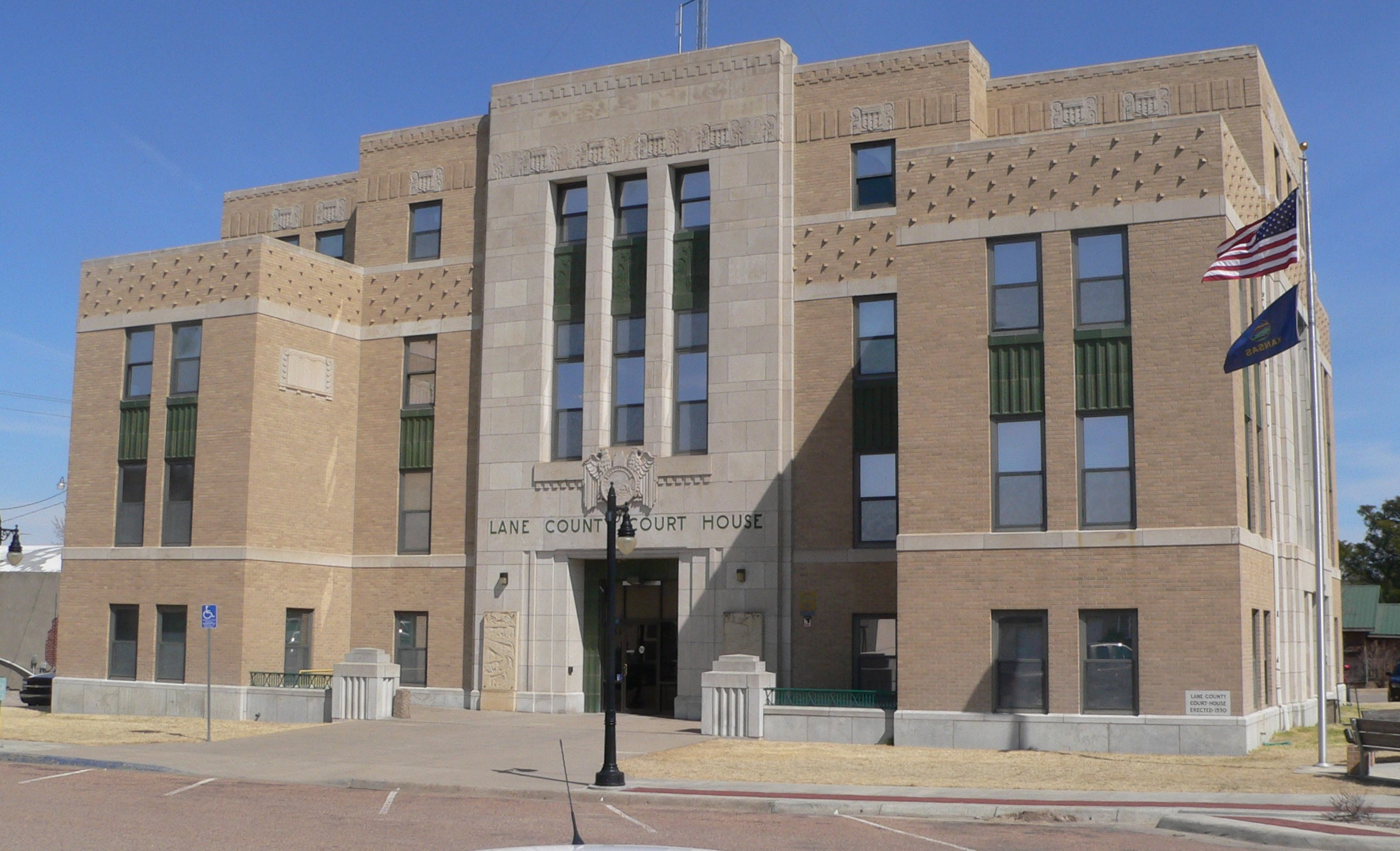
- Lane County Courthouse in Dighton (2015)

- Location within the U.S. state of Kansas
- Coordinates: 38°28′00″N 100°28′01″W
- Country: United States
- State: Kansas
- Founded: March 20, 1873
- Named for: James H. Lane
- Seat: Dighton
- Largest city: Dighton

Area
  - Total: 718 sq mi (1,860 km^{2})
  - Land: 717 sq mi (1,860 km^{2})
  - Water: 0.2 sq mi (0.52 km^{2}) 0.03%

Population (2020)
  - Total: 1,574
  - Estimate (2025): 1,508 ▼
  - Density: 2.2/sq mi (0.85/km^{2})
- Time zone: UTC−6 (Central)
  - Summer (DST): UTC−5 (CDT)
- Congressional district: 1st
- Website: lanecountyks.org

Lane County is a county located in the U.S. state of Kansas. Its county seat is Dighton, the only incorporated city in the county. As of the 2020 census, the county population was 1,574, making it the third-least populous county in Kansas. The county was named after James Lane, a leader of the Jayhawker abolitionist movement who served as one of the first U.S. senators from Kansas.

== History ==
=== Early history ===
For many millennia, the Great Plains of North America was inhabited by nomadic Native Americans. From the 16th century to 18th century, the Kingdom of France claimed ownership of large parts of North America. In 1762, after the French and Indian War, France secretly ceded New France to Spain, per the Treaty of Fontainebleau.

=== 19th century ===
In 1802, Spain returned most of the land to France, but keeping title to about 7,500 square miles. In 1803, most of the land for modern day Kansas was acquired by the United States from France as part of the 828,000 square mile Louisiana Purchase for 2.83 cents per acre.

In 1854, the Kansas Territory was organized, then in 1861 Kansas became the 34th U.S. state. In 1873, Lane County was established.

== Geography ==
According to the United States Census Bureau, the county has a total area of 718 square miles (1,860 km^{2}), of which 717 square miles (1,860 km^{2}) is land and 0.2 square miles (0.52 km^{2}) (0.03%) is water.

=== Adjacent counties ===
- Gove County (north)
- Ness County (east)
- Finney County (south)
- Scott County (west)

== Demographics ==
Historical population
Census	Pop.	Note	%±
1880	604		—
1890	2,060		241.1%
1900	1,563		−24.1%
1910	2,603		66.5%
1920	2,848		9.4%
1930	3,372		18.4%
1940	2,821		−16.3%
1950	2,808		−0.5%
1960	3,060		9.0%
1970	2,707		−11.5%
1980	2,472		−8.7%
1990	2,375		−3.9%
2000	2,155		−9.3%
2010	1,750		−18.8%
2020	1,574		−10.1%
2025 (est.)	1,508	▼	−4.2%
U.S. Decennial Census; 1790-1960 1900-1990; 1990-2000 2010-2020

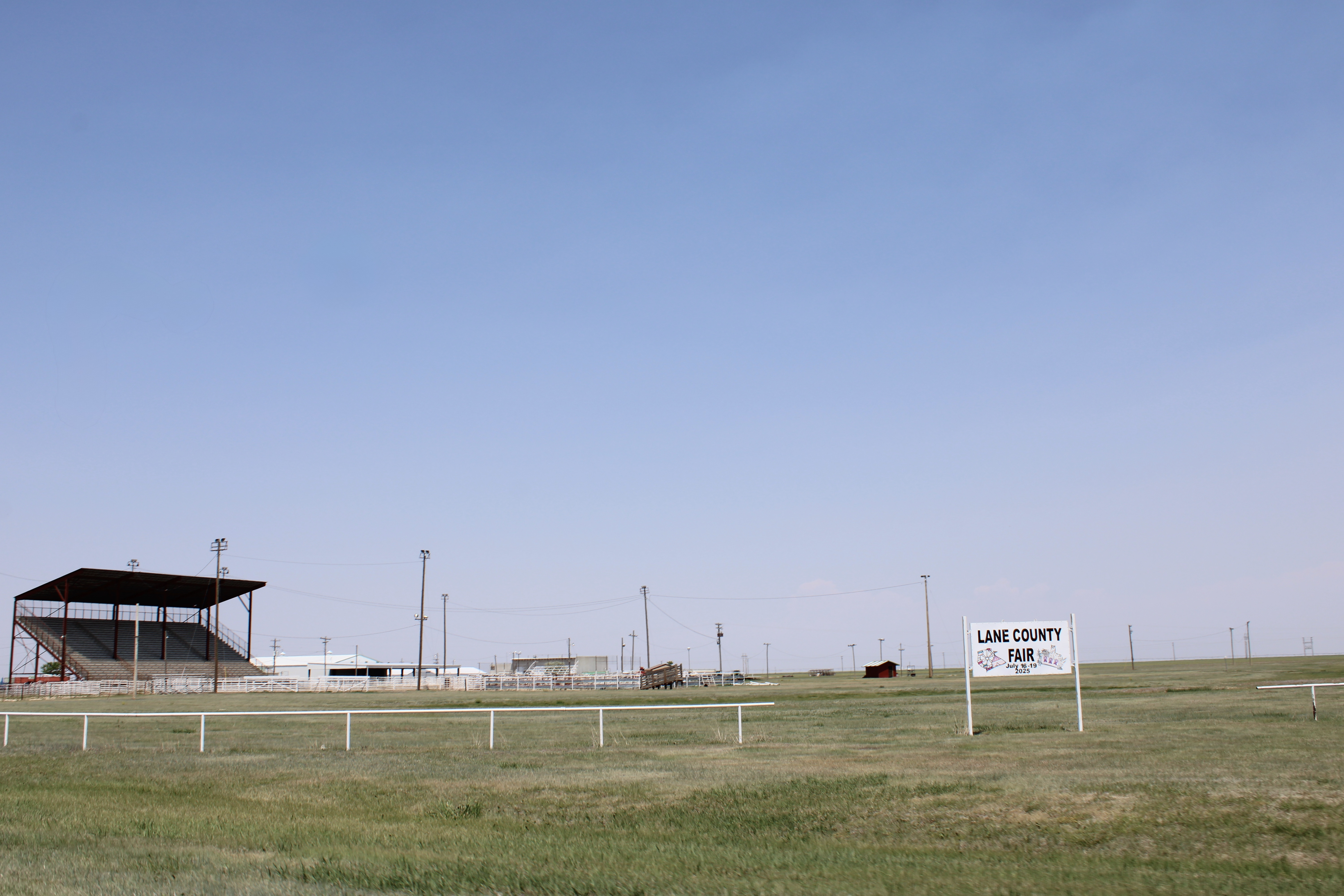
Lane County KS fairgrounds

=== 2020 census ===
As of the 2020 census, the county had a population of 1,574. The median age was 47.7 years. 21.4% of residents were under the age of 18 and 25.4% of residents were 65 years of age or older. For every 100 females there were 99.7 males, and for every 100 females age 18 and over there were 100.2 males age 18 and over. 0.0% of residents lived in urban areas, while 100.0% lived in rural areas.

The racial makeup of the county was 89.3% White, 0.0% Black or African American, 0.5% American Indian and Alaska Native, 0.0% Asian, 0.2% Native Hawaiian and Pacific Islander, 3.2% from some other race, and 6.7% from two or more races. Hispanic or Latino residents of any race comprised 9.1% of the population.

There were 736 households in the county, of which 27.7% had children under the age of 18 living with them and 25.4% had a female householder with no spouse or partner present. About 39.9% of all households were made up of individuals and 18.5% had someone living alone who was 65 years of age or older.

There were 895 housing units, of which 17.8% were vacant. Among occupied housing units, 75.8% were owner-occupied and 24.2% were renter-occupied. The homeowner vacancy rate was 3.5% and the rental vacancy rate was 13.6%.

=== 2000 census ===
As of the census of 2000, there were 2,155 people, 910 households, and 613 families residing in the county. The population density was 3 people per square mile (1.2 people/km^{2}). There were 1,065 housing units at an average density of 2 per square mile (0.77/km^{2}). The racial makeup of the county was 97.73% White, 0.05% Native American, 0.09% Asian, 0.05% Pacific Islander, 0.51% from other races, and 1.58% from two or more races. 1.44% of the population were Hispanic or Latino of any race.

There were 910 households, out of which 29.50% had children under the age of 18 living with them, 59.10% were married couples living together, 5.10% had a female householder with no husband present, and 32.60% were non-families. 30.30% of all households were made up of individuals, and 16.50% had someone living alone who was 65 years of age or older. The average household size was 2.34 and the average family size was 2.91.

In the county, the population was spread out, with 25.40% under the age of 18, 5.40% from 18 to 24, 24.60% from 25 to 44, 24.10% from 45 to 64, and 20.50% who were 65 years of age or older. The median age was 42 years. For every 100 females there were 100.30 males. For every 100 females age 18 and over, there were 97.70 males.

The median income for a household in the county was $36,047, and the median income for a family was $41,892. Males had a median income of $29,429 versus $20,446 for females. The per capita income for the county was $18,606. About 5.40% of families and 8.20% of the population were below the poverty line, including 11.40% of those under age 18 and 7.60% of those age 65 or over.

== Government ==
=== Presidential elections ===
Lane County has been predominantly Republican throughout its history, only voting for Democratic candidates five times in presidential elections from 1888 to the present. The most recent of those wins came in 1964, when Lyndon B. Johnson won it amidst his national landslide.

Presidential election results

United States presidential election results for Lane County, Kansas
Year	Republican		Democratic		Third party(ies)	
Year	No.	%	No.	%	No.	%
1888	459	57.74%	267	33.58%	69	8.68%
1892	284	55.58%	0	0.00%	227	44.42%
1896	241	54.90%	191	43.51%	7	1.59%
1900	239	56.50%	172	40.66%	12	2.84%
1904	353	63.60%	111	20.00%	91	16.40%
1908	357	51.52%	271	39.11%	65	9.38%
1912	158	25.40%	237	38.10%	227	36.50%
1916	363	32.07%	659	58.22%	110	9.72%
1920	656	63.94%	298	29.04%	72	7.02%
1924	693	59.08%	281	23.96%	199	16.97%
1928	954	71.30%	364	27.20%	20	1.49%
1932	672	42.88%	866	55.26%	29	1.85%
1936	682	43.77%	853	54.75%	23	1.48%
1940	888	60.78%	557	38.12%	16	1.10%
1944	773	65.90%	388	33.08%	12	1.02%
1948	764	57.53%	525	39.53%	39	2.94%
1952	1,142	77.85%	311	21.20%	14	0.95%
1956	992	72.09%	380	27.62%	4	0.29%
1960	902	65.41%	462	33.50%	15	1.09%
1964	586	42.77%	773	56.42%	11	0.80%
1968	781	60.64%	385	29.89%	122	9.47%
1972	943	73.21%	294	22.83%	51	3.96%
1976	651	48.91%	646	48.53%	34	2.55%
1980	924	67.54%	321	23.46%	123	8.99%
1984	1,008	77.18%	282	21.59%	16	1.23%
1988	768	61.44%	450	36.00%	32	2.56%
1992	674	51.89%	265	20.40%	360	27.71%
1996	865	70.67%	271	22.14%	88	7.19%
2000	846	74.67%	252	22.24%	35	3.09%
2004	823	81.16%	181	17.85%	10	0.99%
2008	814	79.26%	193	18.79%	20	1.95%
2012	739	79.63%	172	18.53%	17	1.83%
2016	718	82.43%	106	12.17%	47	5.40%
2020	762	85.14%	115	12.85%	18	2.01%
2024	709	84.10%	111	13.17%	23	2.73%

== Education ==
=== Unified school districts ===
- Healy USD 468 - this school district is planning to dissolve and consolidate in 2025.
- Dighton USD 482

== Communities ==
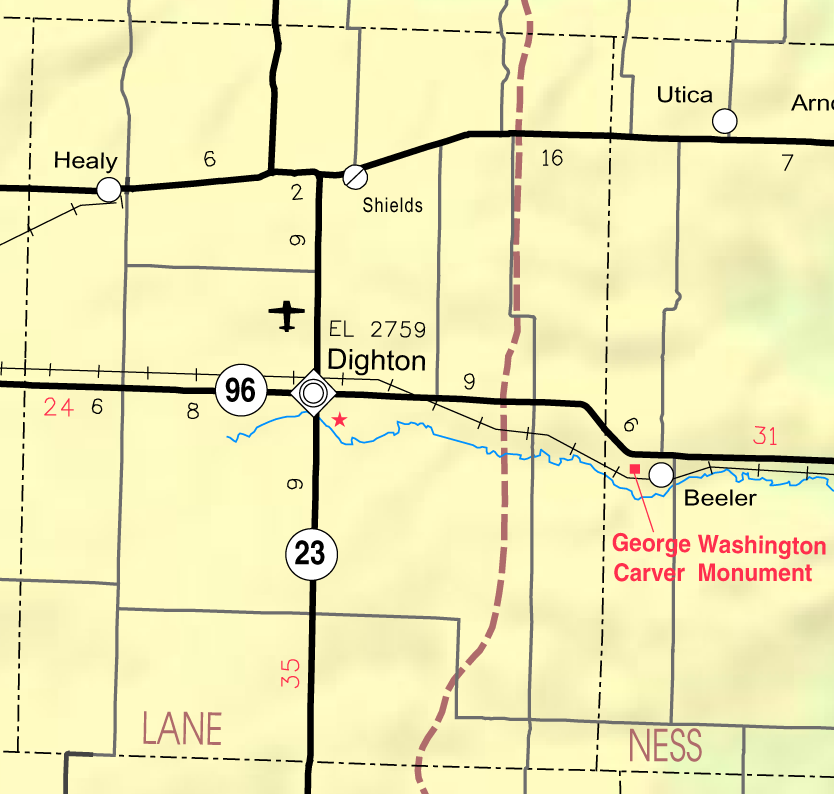
2005 map of Lane County (map legend)

List of townships / incorporated cities / unincorporated communities / extinct former communities within Lane County.
† means a community is designated a Census-Designated Place (CDP) by the United States Census Bureau.

=== City ===
- Dighton (county seat)

=== Unincorporated communities ===
- Alamota
- Amy
- Healy†
- Pendennis
- Shields

=== Townships ===
Lane County is divided into five townships. None of the cities within the county are considered governmentally independent, and all figures for the townships include those of the cities. In the following table, the population center is the largest city (or cities) included in that township's population total, if it is of a significant size.

Sources: 2000 U.S. Gazetteer from the U.S. Census Bureau.
Township	FIPS	Population center	Population	Population density /km^{2} (/sq mi)	Land area km^{2} (sq mi)	Water area km^{2} (sq mi)	Water %	Geographic coordinates
Alamota	00775		108	0 (1)	414 (160)	0 (0)	0%	38°24′55″N 100°19′43″W
Cheyenne	13050		336	1 (4)	245 (94)	0 (0)	0%	38°36′21″N 100°37′22″W
Dighton	18075		1,573	2 (5)	785 (303)	0 (0)	0.01%	38°27′23″N 100°30′11″W
White Rock	77950		26	0 (0)	207 (80)	0 (0)	0.02%	38°37′49″N 100°19′55″W
Wilson	79725		112	1 (1)	206 (80)	0 (0)	0.20%	38°36′47″N 100°28′12″W

== See also ==
- Dry counties

Community information for Kansas

- Kansas locations by per capita income
- List of counties in Kansas
- List of townships in Kansas
- List of cities in Kansas
- List of unincorporated communities in Kansas
- List of ghost towns in Kansas
