= Gove Township, Kansas =

Gove Township
- Township
- Location in Gove County
- Coordinates: 38°56′15″N 100°31′41″W
- Country: United States
- State: Kansas
- County: Gove

Area
  - Total: 116.28 sq mi (301.17 km^{2})
  - Land: 116.28 sq mi (301.17 km^{2})
  - Water: 0 sq mi (0 km^{2}) 0%
- Elevation: 2,779 ft (847 m)

Population (2020)
  - Total: 181
  - Density: 1.56/sq mi (0.601/km^{2})
- GNIS feature ID: 0471377

Gove Township is a township in Gove County, Kansas, United States. As of the 2020 census, its population was 181.

== Geography ==
Gove Township covers an area of 116.28 square miles (301.2 km^{2}) and contains one incorporated settlement, Gove City (the county seat). According to the USGS, it contains one cemetery, Gove.

The streams of Middle Branch Hackberry Creek, North Branch Hackberry Creek, South Branch Hackberry Creek and West Spring Creek run through this township.
