= Payne Township, Gove County, Kansas =

Payne Township
- Township
- Location in Gove County
- Coordinates: 38°59′45″N 100°20′36″W
- Country: United States
- State: Kansas
- County: Gove

Area
  - Total: 125.1 sq mi (323.9 km^{2})
  - Land: 125.05 sq mi (323.89 km^{2})
  - Water: 0.0039 sq mi (0.01 km^{2}) 0%
- Elevation: 2,694 ft (821 m)

Population (2020)
  - Total: 228
  - Density: 1.82/sq mi (0.704/km^{2})
- GNIS feature ID: 0471317

Payne Township is a township in Gove County, Kansas, United States. As of the 2020 census, its population was 228.

== Geography ==
Payne Township covers an area of 125.06 square miles (323.9 km^{2}) and contains one incorporated settlement, Park. According to the USGS, it contains one cemetery, Sacred Heart.

The streams of East Spring Creek and North Fork Big Creek run through this township.

== Transportation ==
Payne Township contains one airport or landing strip, Ashbaugh Airport.
