= 1924 United States presidential election in Kansas =

- November 4, 1924

Nominee	Calvin Coolidge	John W. Davis	Robert M. La Follette
Party	Republican	Democratic	Independent
Alliance			Progressive
Home state	Massachusetts	West Virginia	Wisconsin
Running mate	Charles G. Dawes	Charles W. Bryan	Burton K. Wheeler
Electoral vote	10	0	0
Popular vote	407,671	156,319	98,461
Percentage	61.54%	23.60%	14.86%
County results
Coolidge
40–50%
50–60%
60–70%
70–80%
President before election
Calvin Coolidge
Republican
Elected President
Calvin Coolidge
Republican

The 1924 United States presidential election in Kansas was held on November 4, 1924, as part of the 1924 United States presidential election. State voters chose ten electors to the Electoral College, who voted for president and vice president.

A rapid recovery from the depression of 1920 and 1921, despite major Republican losses during the 1922 House elections placed the Republican Party – who gained a record popular-vote majority in the 1920 election – in a secure position despite the death of President Warren G. Harding in 1923. Rises in wages and ebbing of discontent further solidified the GOP's hold on power. More critically, the Democratic Party was mortally divided between its rural Southern faction led by William Gibbs McAdoo and its white ethnic urban northeastern faction led by New York Governor Al Smith. The revived Ku Klux Klan supported the rural faction and was in favor of Prohibition, whereas the white ethnic faction was firmly against the anti-Catholic Klan and opposed to Prohibition. A fierce debate ensued that saw a compromise candidate, former Congressman John W. Davis of West Virginia, nominated after one hundred and three ballots in hot summer weather at Madison Square Garden. Although West Virginia was a border state whose limited African-American population had not been disenfranchised as happened in all former Confederate States, Davis did share the extreme social conservatism of Southern Democrats of his era. He supported poll taxes, opposed women's suffrage, and believed in strictly limited government with no expansion in nonmilitary fields.

The conservatism of Coolidge and Davis made it inevitable that aging Wisconsin maverick Robert M. La Follette would mount a third-party challenge – which La Follette had planned even before the Democratic Convention. La Follette was formally nominated on July 4 by the "Conference for Progressive Political Action" and developed a platform dedicated to eliminating child labor and American interference in Latin American political affairs, along with a formal denunciation of the Ku Klux Klan. La Follette also proposed major judicial reforms including amendments allowing Congress to override judicial review and to re-enact laws declared unconstitutional. La Follette also called for the election of federal judges for ten-year terms.

== Results ==
Presidential Candidate	Running Mate	Party	Electoral Vote (EV)	Popular Vote (PV)	
Calvin Coolidge of Massachusetts	Charles G. Dawes	Republican	10	407,671	61.54%
John W. Davis	Charles W. Bryan	Democratic	0	156,319	23.60%
Robert M. La Follette	Burton K. Wheeler	Independent	0	98,461	14.86%
Write-ins	—	—	0	3	0.00%

=== Results by county ===
1924 United States presidential election in Kansas by county
County	John Calvin Coolidge Republican		John William Davis Democratic		Robert Marion La Follette Sr. Independent		Margin		Total votes cast
County	#	%	#	%	#	%	#	%	Total votes cast
Allen	6,101	69.94%	2,181	25.00%	441	5.06%	3,920	44.94%	8,723
Anderson	3,101	60.98%	1,421	27.94%	563	11.07%	1,680	33.04%	5,085
Atchison	6,246	63.83%	2,199	22.47%	1,341	13.70%	4,047	41.35%	9,786
Barber	2,218	58.25%	909	23.87%	681	17.88%	1,309	34.38%	3,808
Barton	4,109	56.49%	1,605	22.06%	1,560	21.45%	2,504	34.42%	7,274
Bourbon	4,210	48.96%	2,850	33.15%	1,538	17.89%	1,360	15.82%	8,598
Brown	5,647	68.94%	1,866	22.78%	678	8.28%	3,781	46.16%	8,191
Butler	7,367	57.93%	3,642	28.64%	1,707	13.42%	3,725	29.29%	12,716
Chase	1,822	62.61%	758	26.05%	330	11.34%	1,064	36.56%	2,910
Chautauqua	2,439	59.99%	1,087	26.73%	540	13.28%	1,352	33.25%	4,066
Cherokee	5,437	52.90%	3,071	29.88%	1,770	17.22%	2,366	23.02%	10,278
Cheyenne	1,119	50.38%	485	21.84%	617	27.78%	502 (Note: In this county where La Follette ran second ahead of Davis, the margin given is that between Coolidge and La Follette and percentage margin Coolidge percentage minus La Follette percentage.)	22.60%	2,221
Clark	969	59.16%	410	25.03%	259	15.81%	559	34.13%	1,638
Clay	3,767	62.93%	1,417	23.67%	802	13.40%	2,350	39.26%	5,986
Cloud	4,342	62.57%	1,238	17.84%	1,359	19.58%	2,983	42.99%	6,939
Coffey	3,552	62.47%	1,631	28.68%	503	8.85%	1,921	33.78%	5,686
Comanche	1,049	60.25%	432	24.81%	260	14.93%	617	35.44%	1,741
Cowley	8,529	58.51%	3,161	21.68%	2,887	19.81%	5,368	36.83%	14,577
Crawford	9,063	50.34%	3,433	19.07%	5,509	30.60%	3,554	19.74%	18,005
Decatur	1,621	46.89%	1,218	35.23%	618	17.88%	403	11.66%	3,457
Dickinson	6,178	64.58%	1,690	17.67%	1,698	17.75%	4,480	46.83%	9,566
Doniphan	3,789	72.78%	1,072	20.59%	345	6.63%	2,717	52.19%	5,206
Douglas	8,052	75.25%	1,922	17.96%	726	6.79%	6,130	57.29%	10,700
Edwards	1,929	66.98%	548	19.03%	403	13.99%	1,381	47.95%	2,880
Elk	2,443	64.26%	1,104	29.04%	255	6.71%	1,339	35.22%	3,802
Ellis	1,763	46.37%	842	22.15%	1,197	31.48%	566	14.89%	3,802
Ellsworth	2,286	58.77%	950	24.42%	654	16.81%	1,336	34.34%	3,890
Finney	1,753	61.66%	614	21.60%	476	16.74%	1,139	40.06%	2,843
Ford	3,449	57.99%	1,551	26.08%	948	15.94%	1,898	31.91%	5,948
Franklin	6,008	67.05%	2,324	25.94%	628	7.01%	3,684	41.12%	8,960
Geary	2,678	66.34%	723	17.91%	636	15.75%	1,955	48.43%	4,037
Gove	1,211	67.77%	400	22.38%	176	9.85%	811	45.38%	1,787
Graham	1,631	53.78%	629	20.74%	773	25.49%	858	28.29%	3,033
Grant	459	67.11%	148	21.64%	77	11.26%	311	45.47%	684
Gray	959	59.34%	463	28.65%	194	12.00%	496	30.69%	1,616
Greeley	357	64.21%	75	13.49%	124	22.30%	233	41.91%	556
Greenwood	4,181	64.02%	1,794	27.47%	556	8.51%	2,387	36.55%	6,531
Hamilton	610	52.27%	307	26.31%	250	21.42%	303	25.96%	1,167
Harper	2,280	53.25%	1,321	30.85%	681	15.90%	959	22.40%	4,282
Harvey	4,499	58.96%	1,744	22.86%	1,387	18.18%	2,755	36.11%	7,630
Haskell	493	65.13%	167	22.06%	97	12.81%	326	43.06%	757
Hodgeman	899	60.66%	367	24.76%	216	14.57%	532	35.90%	1,482
Jackson	4,391	71.09%	1,419	22.97%	367	5.94%	2,972	48.11%	6,177
Jefferson	4,422	72.71%	1,320	21.70%	340	5.59%	3,102	51.00%	6,082
Jewell	4,342	64.83%	1,861	27.78%	495	7.39%	2,481	37.04%	6,698
Johnson	6,102	66.15%	2,519	27.31%	603	6.54%	3,583	38.84%	9,224
Kearny	635	57.57%	199	18.04%	269	24.39%	366	33.18%	1,103
Kingman	2,416	54.33%	1,077	24.22%	954	21.45%	1,339	30.11%	4,447
Kiowa	1,541	70.08%	498	22.65%	160	7.28%	1,043	47.43%	2,199
Labette	6,593	55.25%	2,971	24.90%	2,369	19.85%	3,622	30.35%	11,933
Lane	693	59.08%	281	23.96%	199	16.97%	412	35.12%	1,173
Leavenworth	9,429	68.05%	2,982	21.52%	1,445	10.43%	6,447	46.53%	13,856
Lincoln	2,277	59.41%	615	16.04%	941	24.55%	1,336	34.86%	3,833
Linn	3,161	57.91%	1,683	30.84%	614	11.25%	1,478	27.08%	5,458
Logan	942	63.86%	286	19.39%	247	16.75%	656	44.47%	1,475
Lyon	6,290	57.32%	2,750	25.06%	1,934	17.62%	3,540	32.26%	10,974
Marion	4,008	56.38%	1,520	21.38%	1,581	22.24%	2,427	34.14%	7,109
Marshall	5,809	62.35%	2,369	25.43%	1,139	12.22%	3,440	36.92%	9,317
McPherson	5,128	65.99%	1,530	19.69%	1,113	14.32%	3,598	46.30%	7,771
Meade	1,290	66.94%	472	24.49%	165	8.56%	818	42.45%	1,927
Miami	4,788	61.76%	1,994	25.72%	971	12.52%	2,794	36.04%	7,753
Mitchell	3,161	59.79%	1,470	27.80%	656	12.41%	1,691	31.98%	5,287
Montgomery	11,160	65.02%	4,178	24.34%	1,825	10.63%	6,982	40.68%	17,163
Morris	3,089	64.70%	1,040	21.78%	645	13.51%	2,049	42.92%	4,774
Morton	669	55.02%	286	23.52%	261	21.46%	383	31.50%	1,216
Nemaha	4,096	60.24%	1,846	27.15%	857	12.60%	2,250	33.09%	6,799
Neosho	5,106	58.70%	2,274	26.14%	1,319	15.16%	2,832	32.56%	8,699
Ness	1,629	64.64%	541	21.47%	350	13.89%	1,088	43.17%	2,520
Norton	2,778	59.33%	1,261	26.93%	643	13.73%	1,517	32.40%	4,682
Osage	4,957	63.20%	2,050	26.14%	836	10.66%	2,907	37.06%	7,843
Osborne	3,333	71.55%	905	19.43%	420	9.02%	2,428	52.13%	4,658
Ottawa	2,475	60.25%	854	20.79%	779	18.96%	1,621	39.46%	4,108
Pawnee	2,407	62.54%	1,111	28.86%	331	8.60%	1,296	33.67%	3,849
Phillips	2,647	54.97%	1,376	28.58%	792	16.45%	1,271	26.40%	4,815
Pottawatomie	4,340	68.28%	1,471	23.14%	545	8.57%	2,869	45.14%	6,356
Pratt	2,762	57.36%	1,205	25.03%	848	17.61%	1,557	32.34%	4,815
Rawlins	1,213	45.79%	742	28.01%	694	26.20%	471	17.78%	2,649
Reno	10,339	65.23%	3,675	23.18%	1,837	11.59%	6,664	42.04%	15,851
Republic	3,671	59.96%	1,616	26.40%	835	13.64%	2,055	33.57%	6,122
Rice	3,920	68.53%	1,303	22.78%	497	8.69%	2,617	45.75%	5,720
Riley	5,455	70.03%	1,646	21.13%	689	8.84%	3,809	48.90%	7,790
Rooks	2,442	66.02%	930	25.14%	324	8.76%	1,512	40.88%	3,699 (Note: In this county there were three write-in votes for candidates not on the ballot.)
Rush	1,780	57.25%	787	25.31%	542	17.43%	993	31.94%	3,109
Russell	2,637	64.30%	687	16.75%	777	18.95%	1,860	45.35%	4,101
Saline	6,534	62.20%	1,966	18.71%	2,005	19.09%	4,529	43.11%	10,505
Scott	734	50.87%	445	30.84%	264	18.30%	289	20.03%	1,443
Sedgwick	21,144	57.23%	8,712	23.58%	7,087	19.18%	12,432	33.65%	36,943
Seward	1,184	52.00%	676	29.69%	417	18.31%	508	22.31%	2,277
Shawnee	20,132	72.21%	5,099	18.29%	2,647	9.49%	15,033	53.92%	27,878
Sheridan	1,320	59.11%	542	24.27%	371	16.61%	778	34.84%	2,233
Sherman	1,122	45.89%	528	21.60%	795	32.52%	327	13.37%	2,445
Smith	3,226	57.23%	1,634	28.99%	777	13.78%	1,592	28.24%	5,637
Stafford	3,100	68.58%	957	21.17%	463	10.24%	2,143	47.41%	4,520
Stanton	379	62.44%	158	26.03%	70	11.53%	221	36.41%	607
Stevens	913	66.55%	302	22.01%	157	11.44%	611	44.53%	1,372
Sumner	5,552	54.93%	2,556	25.29%	2,000	19.79%	2,996	29.64%	10,108
Thomas	1,436	52.50%	822	30.05%	477	17.44%	614	22.45%	2,735
Trego	1,121	58.14%	399	20.70%	408	21.16%	713	36.98%	1,928
Wabaunsee	2,742	65.90%	633	15.21%	786	18.89%	1,956	47.01%	4,161
Wallace	603	53.70%	171	15.23%	349	31.08%	254	22.62%	1,123
Washington	4,120	60.98%	1,528	22.62%	1,108	16.40%	2,592	38.37%	6,756
Wichita	482	62.68%	147	19.12%	140	18.21%	335	43.56%	769
Wilson	4,596	65.00%	1,736	24.55%	739	10.45%	2,860	40.45%	7,071
Woodson	2,412	63.17%	1,026	26.87%	380	9.95%	1,386	36.30%	3,818
Wyandotte	23,881	59.48%	8,913	22.20%	7,354	18.32%	14,968	37.28%	40,148
Totals	407,671	61.54%	156,319	23.60%	98,461	14.86%	251,352	37.94%	662,455

== Analysis ==
Despite problems in the state's large agricultural sector, La Follette did not have the appeal in Kansas he had in more northerly areas of the Midwest, as isolationism was much weaker in this largely Anglo-Saxon Protestant state and Bryan-era pietist Democratic support struck a different cultural vein from La Follette's largely Catholic and Lutheran backers. Unlike the Bryanites, La Follette's base strongly opposed the Ku Klux Klan, which was widely popular in Kansas, and was focused on farm cooperatives.

Kansas was won decisively by the Republican Party candidate, incumbent President Calvin Coolidge with 61.54 percent of the popular vote. The Democratic Party candidate, John W. Davis, garnered only 23.60 percent of the popular vote. La Follette, listed as an “Independent” on the Kansas ballot was not as successful as in the more northern Plains States due to Kansas being largely devoid of the German- and Scandinavian-Americans who were his primary support base. The Wisconsin Senator did not crack a third of the vote in any county, and Coolidge replicated Harding in 1920 and Theodore Roosevelt in 1904 by sweeping all 105 counties in Kansas.

== See also ==
- United States presidential elections in Kansas
