= Gove County, Kansas =

County in Kansas, United States

- County
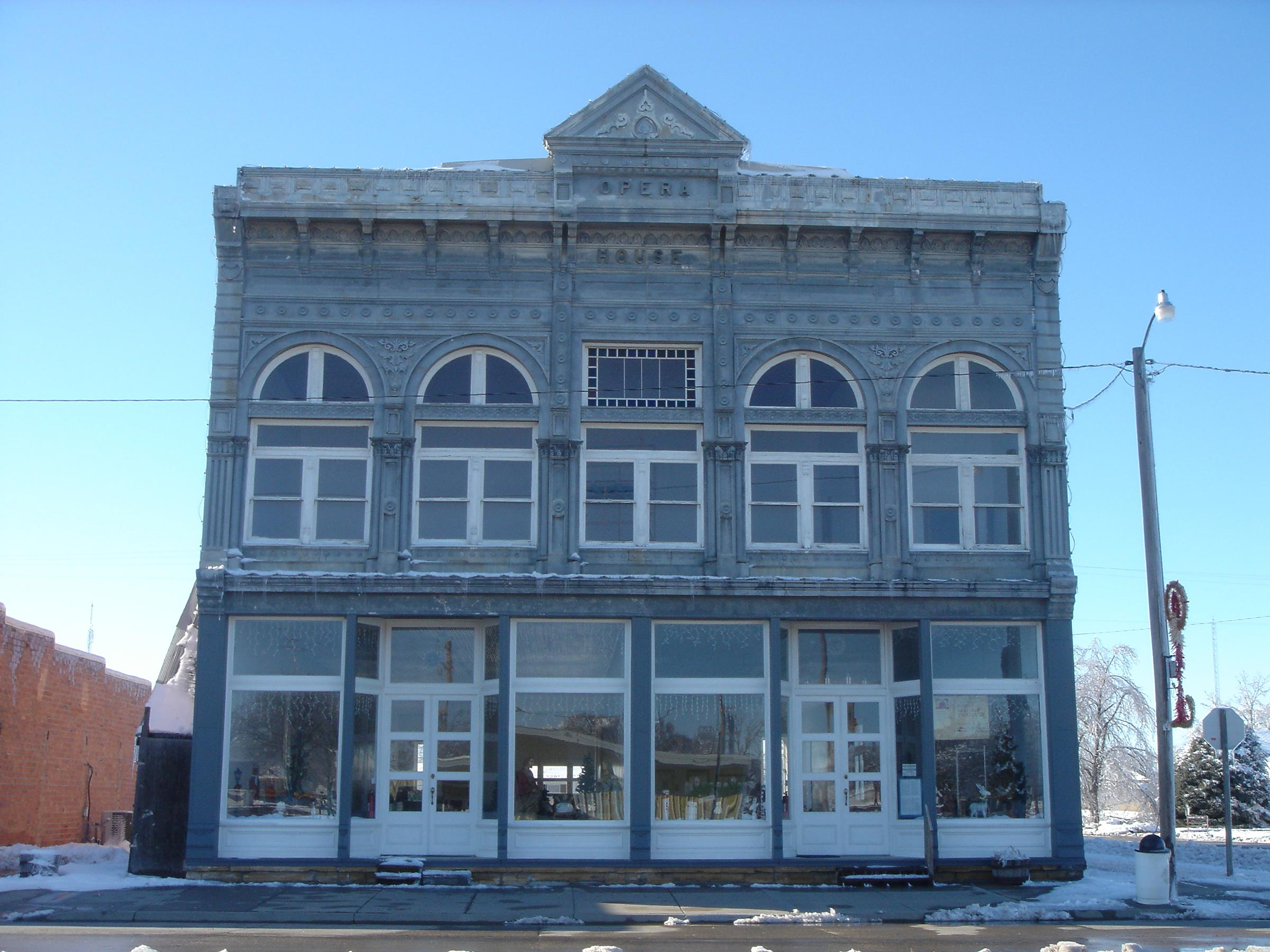
- Historic Opera House in Grainfield

- Location within the U.S. state of Kansas
- Coordinates: 38°55′12″N 100°29′48″W
- Country: United States
- State: Kansas
- Founded: March 11, 1868
- Named for: Grenville L. Gove
- Seat: Gove City
- Largest city: Quinter

Area
  - Total: 1,072 sq mi (2,780 km^{2})
  - Land: 1,072 sq mi (2,780 km^{2})
  - Water: 0.1 sq mi (0.26 km^{2}) 0.01%

Population (2020)
  - Total: 2,718
  - Estimate (2025): 2,631 ▼
  - Density: 2.5/sq mi (0.97/km^{2})
- Time zone: UTC−6 (Central)
  - Summer (DST): UTC−5 (CDT)
- Congressional district: 1st
- Website: govecountyks.gov

Gove County is a county in the U.S. state of Kansas. Its county seat is Gove City, and its most populous city is Quinter. As of the 2020 census, the county population was 2,718. The county was named for Granville Gove, a captain of Company G of the 11th Kansas Cavalry Regiment Volunteer Cavalry, who died from battle wounds during the American Civil War.

== History ==
=== Early history ===
Eighty million years ago, Gove County was part of an ancient inland sea known as the Western Interior Seaway. Many students still visit the Castle Rock Badlands today to explore fossils.

For many millennia, the Great Plains of North America were inhabited by nomadic Native Americans. From the 16th to the 18th centuries, the Kingdom of France claimed ownership of large parts of North America. In 1762, after the French and Indian War, France secretly ceded New France to Spain, per the Treaty of Fontainebleau.

=== 19th century ===
In 1802, Spain returned most of the land to France, but kept the title to about 7,500 square miles. In 1803, most of the land for modern-day Kansas was acquired by the United States from France as part of the 828,000-square-mile Louisiana Purchase for 2.83 cents per acre.

In 1854, the Kansas Territory was organized; then in 1861, Kansas became the 34th U.S. state. In 1868, Gove County was established and named for Granville Llewellyn Gove, member of the 11th Regiment Kansas Volunteer Cavalry, and son of Moses Gove, a former mayor of Manhattan, Kansas.

=== 21st century ===
In 2020, USA Today profiled Gove County during the COVID-19 pandemic in the United States, and called it the "deadliest place in America" due to it having the highest death rate from COVID-19 compared to any other county in the nation: One out of every 132 people. The first deaths were reported on October 7; as of November 2020, 20 residents died from the virus, and 314 other positive cases were reported. The article attributed the high death rate to predominant public opposition towards wearing face masks, doubts over the pandemic's severity, and the county's high median age, all of which left residents highly vulnerable.

== Geography ==
According to the U.S. Census Bureau, the county has an area of 1,072 square miles (2,780 km^{2}), of which 0.1 square miles (0.26 km^{2}) (0.01%) is covered by water.

=== Adjacent counties ===
- Sheridan County (north)
- Graham County (northeast)
- Trego County (east)
- Ness County (southeast)
- Lane County (south)
- Scott County (southwest)
- Logan County (west)
- Thomas County (northwest)

== Demographics ==
Historical population
Census	Pop.	Note	%±
1880	1,196		—
1890	2,994		150.3%
1900	2,441		−18.5%
1910	6,044		147.6%
1920	4,748		−21.4%
1930	5,643		18.9%
1940	4,793		−15.1%
1950	4,447		−7.2%
1960	4,107		−7.6%
1970	3,940		−4.1%
1980	3,726		−5.4%
1990	3,231		−13.3%
2000	3,068		−5.0%
2010	2,695		−12.2%
2020	2,718		0.9%
2025 (est.)	2,631	▼	−3.2%
U.S. Decennial Census; 1790-1960 1900-1990; 1990-2000 2010-2020

=== 2020 census ===
As of the 2020 census, the county had a population of 2,718, the median age was 42.7 years, 25.8% of residents were under the age of 18, and 22.8% of residents were 65 years of age or older. For every 100 females there were 102.5 males, and for every 100 females age 18 and over there were 102.0 males age 18 and over. No residents lived in urban areas while 100.0% lived in rural areas.

The racial makeup of the county was 92.6% White, 0.2% Black or African American, 0.1% American Indian and Alaska Native, 0.6% Asian, 0.0% Native Hawaiian and Pacific Islander, 1.1% from some other race, and 5.4% from two or more races. Hispanic or Latino residents of any race comprised 3.1% of the population.

There were 1,120 households in the county, of which 27.7% had children under the age of 18 living with them and 20.4% had a female householder with no spouse or partner present. About 31.3% of all households were made up of individuals and 14.5% had someone living alone who was 65 years of age or older.

There were 1,319 housing units, of which 15.1% were vacant. Among occupied housing units, 76.0% were owner-occupied and 24.0% were renter-occupied. The homeowner vacancy rate was 2.2% and the rental vacancy rate was 8.2%.

=== 2000 census ===
As of the 2000 census, 3,068 people, 1,245 households, and 861 families resided in the county. The population density was 3 people per square mile (1.2 people/km^{2}). The 1,423 housing units had an average density of 1 per square mile (0.39/km^{2}). The racial makeup of the county was 97.95% White, 0.10% Black or African American, 0.16% Native American, 0.10% Asian, 0.72% from other races, and 0.98% from two or more races. Hispanics or Latinos of any race were 1.24% of the population.

Of the 1,245 households, 28.4% had children under 18 living with them, 63.5% were married couples living together, 3.5% had a female householder with no husband present, and 30.8% were not families. About 29.7% of all households were made up of individuals, and 17.5% had someone living alone who was 65 or older. The average household size was 2.42 and the average family size was 3.01.

In the county, the age distribution was 26.2% under 18, 5.4% from 18 to 24, 22.1% from 25 to 44, 23.7% from 45 to 64, and 22.7% who were 65 or older. The median age was 43 years. For every 100 females, there were 95.20 males. For every 100 females 18 and over, there were 92.30 males.

The median income for a household in the county was $33,510, and for a family was $40,438. Males had a median income of $26,863 versus $21,357 for females. The per capita income for the county was $17,852. About 8.0% of families and 10.30% of the population were below the poverty line, including 13.9% of those under 18 and 6.9% of those 65 or over.

== Government ==
=== Presidential elections ===
Presidential election results

United States presidential election results for Gove County, Kansas
Year	Republican		Democratic		Third party(ies)	
Year	No.	%	No.	%	No.	%
1888	586	65.84%	278	31.24%	26	2.92%
1892	327	56.87%	0	0.00%	248	43.13%
1896	279	55.36%	204	40.48%	21	4.17%
1900	368	58.41%	253	40.16%	9	1.43%
1904	470	63.17%	204	27.42%	70	9.41%
1908	632	55.15%	456	39.79%	58	5.06%
1912	170	18.56%	355	38.76%	391	42.69%
1916	642	40.07%	862	53.81%	98	6.12%
1920	950	74.92%	285	22.48%	33	2.60%
1924	1,211	67.77%	400	22.38%	176	9.85%
1928	1,470	70.95%	590	28.47%	12	0.58%
1932	1,043	45.75%	1,186	52.02%	51	2.24%
1936	1,107	49.75%	1,090	48.99%	28	1.26%
1940	1,352	66.31%	659	32.32%	28	1.37%
1944	1,125	72.02%	420	26.89%	17	1.09%
1948	1,030	57.48%	719	40.12%	43	2.40%
1952	1,453	75.84%	453	23.64%	10	0.52%
1956	1,315	72.29%	492	27.05%	12	0.66%
1960	1,065	55.85%	828	43.42%	14	0.73%
1964	774	42.69%	1,022	56.37%	17	0.94%
1968	1,018	59.05%	538	31.21%	168	9.74%
1972	1,226	69.86%	466	26.55%	63	3.59%
1976	860	48.95%	848	48.26%	49	2.79%
1980	1,263	71.11%	396	22.30%	117	6.59%
1984	1,310	73.43%	426	23.88%	48	2.69%
1988	966	57.36%	663	39.37%	55	3.27%
1992	792	46.42%	379	22.22%	535	31.36%
1996	1,123	69.19%	351	21.63%	149	9.18%
2000	1,122	75.05%	296	19.80%	77	5.15%
2004	1,196	81.53%	247	16.84%	24	1.64%
2008	1,136	80.11%	261	18.41%	21	1.48%
2012	1,168	84.45%	176	12.73%	39	2.82%
2016	1,140	84.88%	149	11.09%	54	4.02%
2020	1,291	87.76%	166	11.28%	14	0.95%
2024	1,227	87.89%	150	10.74%	19	1.36%

=== Laws ===
Although the Kansas Constitution was amended in 1986 to allow the sale of alcoholic liquor by the individual drink with the approval of voters, Gove County has remained a prohibition, or "dry", county.

== Education ==
=== Unified school districts ===
- Grinnell USD 291
- Wheatland USD 292
- Quinter USD 293

== Attractions ==
- Castle Rock
- Monument Rocks

== Communities ==
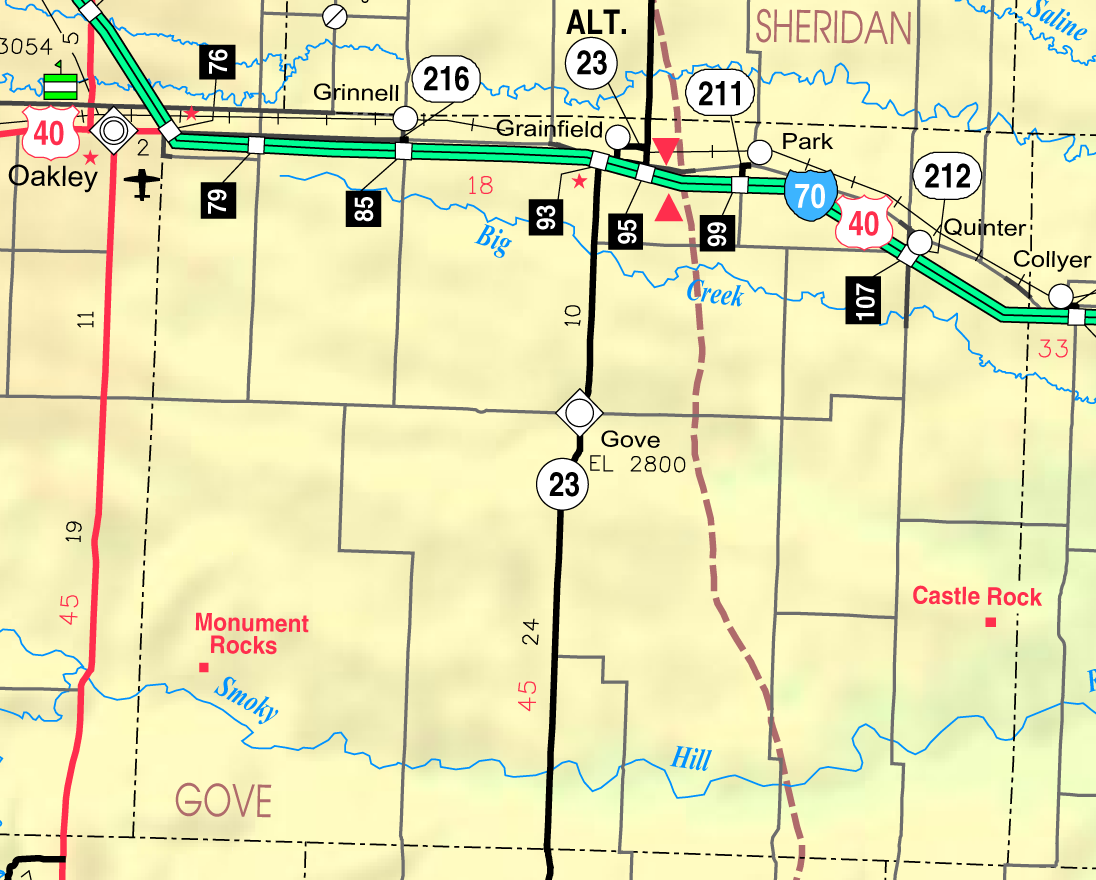
2005 map of Gove County (map legend)

List of townships / incorporated cities / unincorporated communities / extinct former communities within Gove County.
‡ means a community has portions in an adjacent county.

=== Cities ===
- Gove City (county seat)
- Grainfield
- Grinnell
- Oakley‡ - originally named Carlyle, then Cleveland
- Park - originally named Buffalo Park
- Quinter - originally named Melota, then Familton

=== Unincorporated community ===
- Campus

=== Ghost towns ===
- Alanthus
- Hackberry
- Jerome

=== Townships ===
Gove County is divided into nine townships. None of the cities within the county are considered governmentally independent, and all figures for the townships include those of the cities. In the following table, the population center is the largest city (or cities) included in that township's population total, if it is of a significant size.

Township	FIPS	Population center	Population	Population density /km^{2} (/sq mi)	Land area km^{2} (sq mi)	Water area km^{2} (sq mi)	Water %	Geographic coordinates
Baker	03775	Quinter	1,357	4 (11)	324 (125)	0 (0)	0%	39°2′18″N 100°13′56″W
Gaeland	25000		46	0 (1)	208 (80)	0 (0)	0%	38°56′21″N 100°44′30″W
Gove	27075		215	1 (2)	301 (116)	0 (0)	0%	38°57′19″N 100°31′44″W
Grainfield	27225	Grainfield	430	2 (6)	184 (71)	0 (0)	0%	39°5′41″N 100°28′28″W
Grinnell	28925	Grinnell	480	2 (4)	320 (123)	0 (0)	0.04%	39°5′50″N 100°41′41″W
Jerome	35425		132	0 (1)	370 (143)	0 (0)	0.01%	38°48′3″N 100°28′45″W
Larrabee	38750		80	0 (1)	371 (143)	0 (0)	0.01%	38°47′24″N 100°15′14″W
Lewis	39750		13	0 (0)	372 (144)	0 (0)	0%	38°46′23″N 100°43′39″W
Payne	55050		315	1 (3)	324 (125)	0 (0)	0%	39°3′4″N 100°20′42″W
Sources: "Census 2000 U.S. Gazetteer Files". U.S. Census Bureau, Geography Division. Archived from the original on August 2, 2002.

== Gallery ==
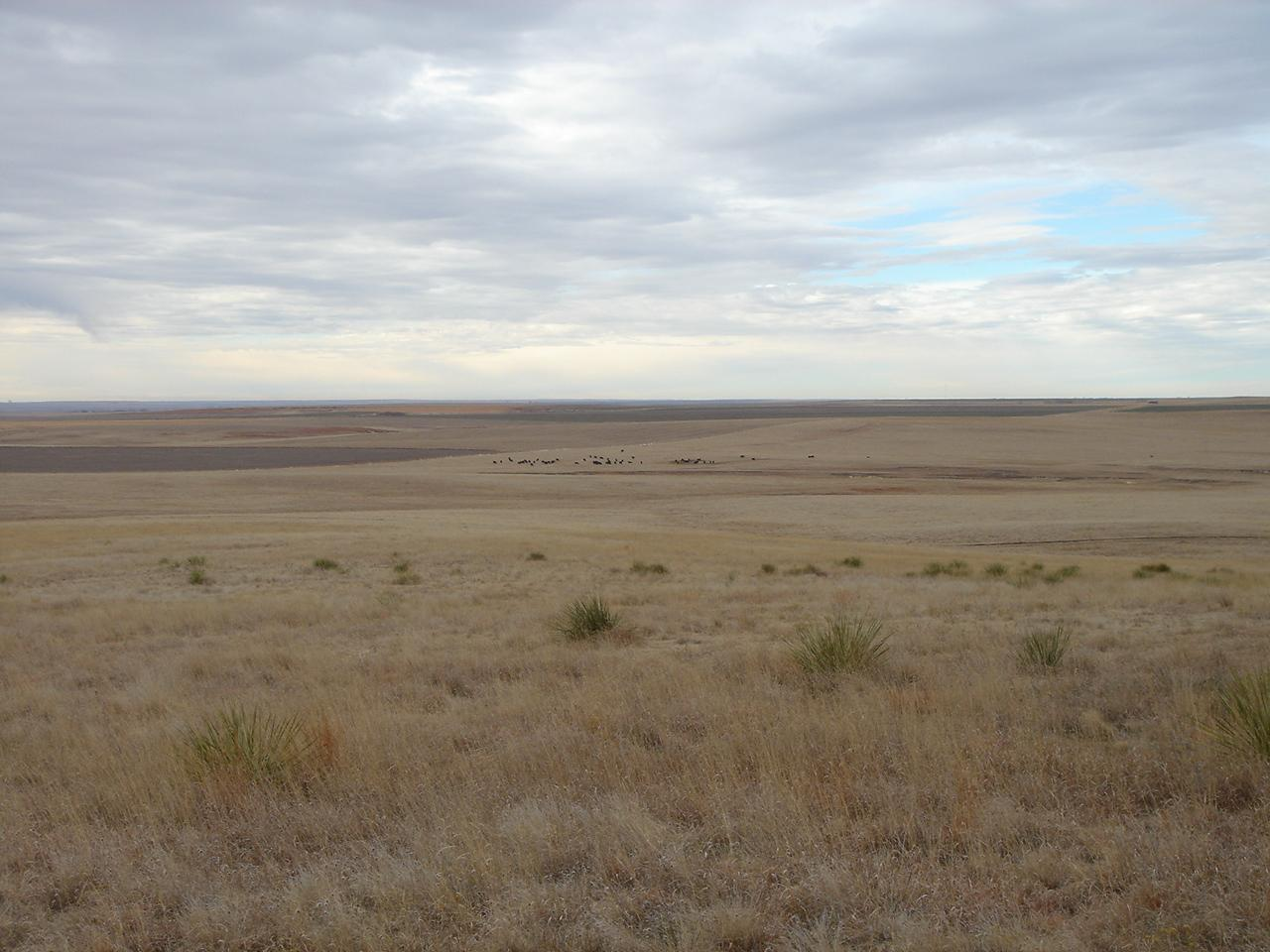

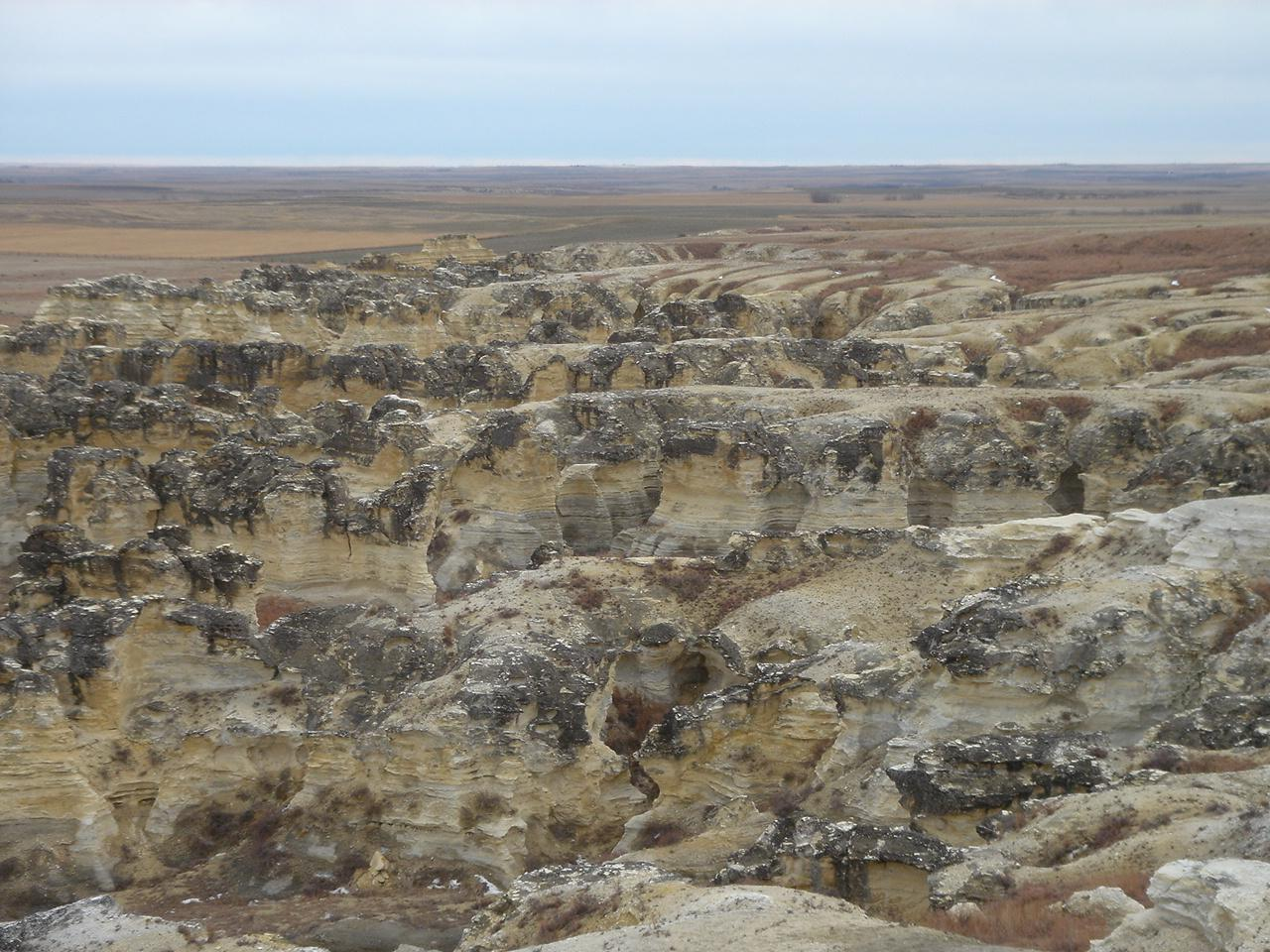

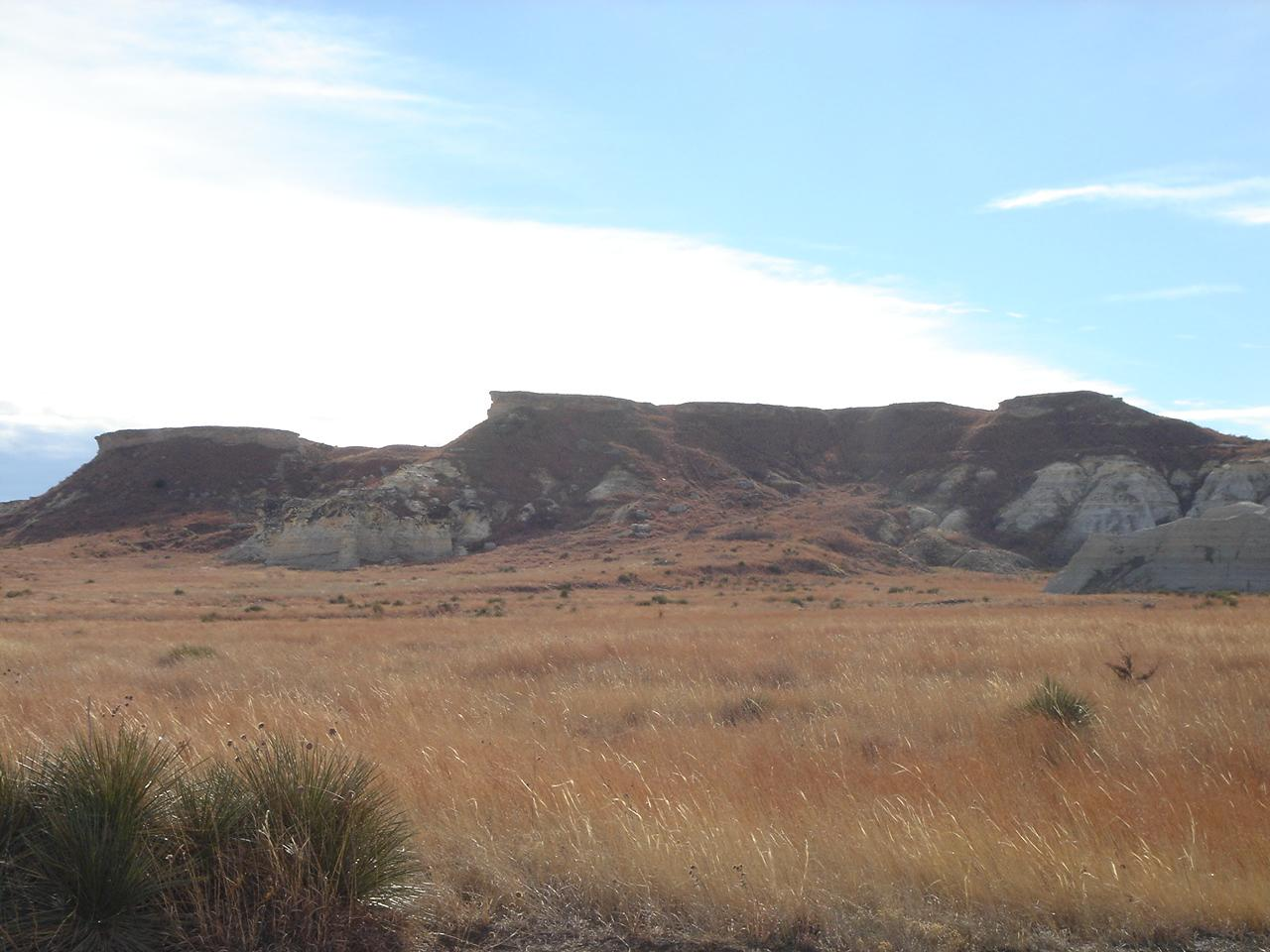

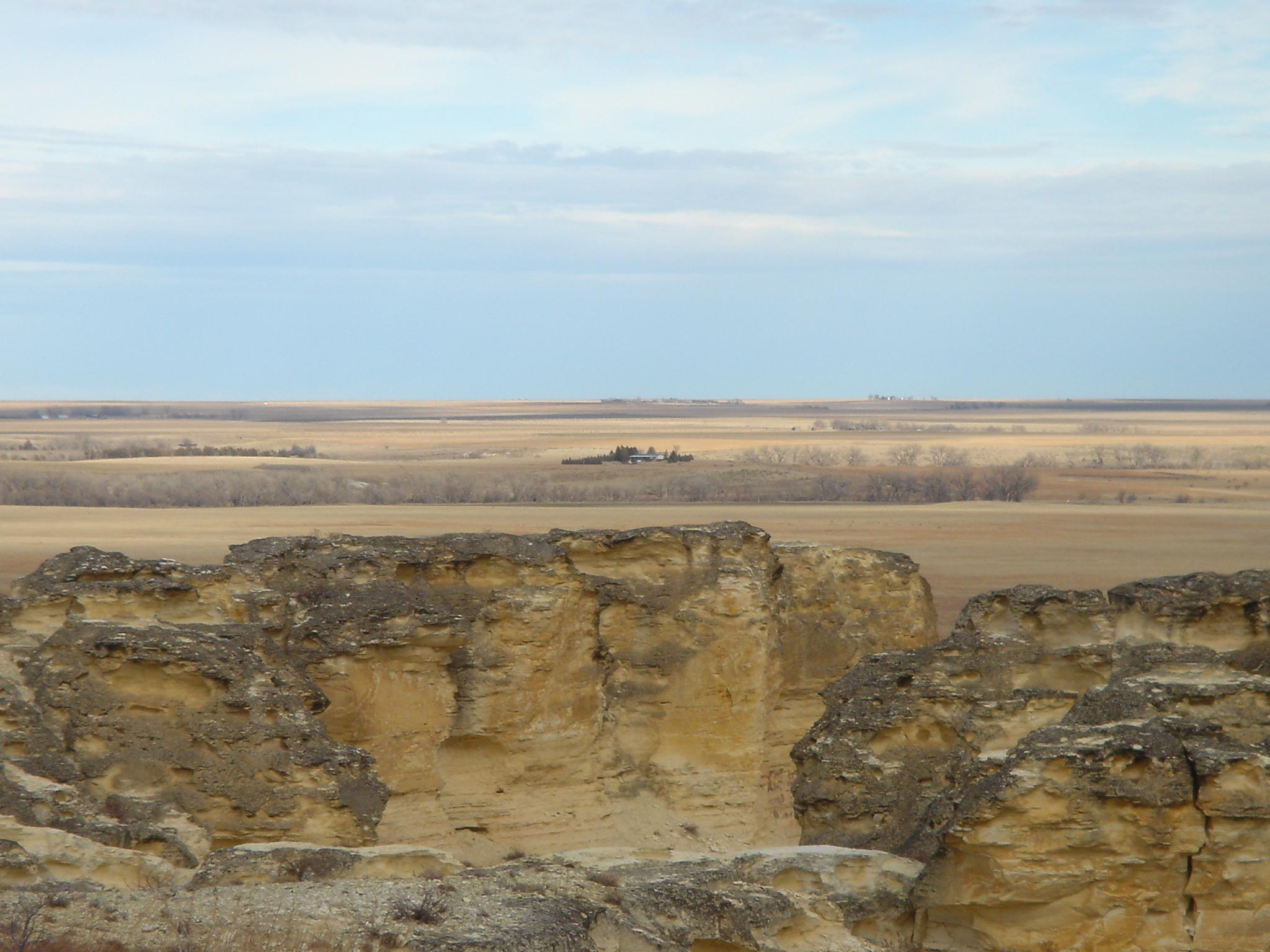

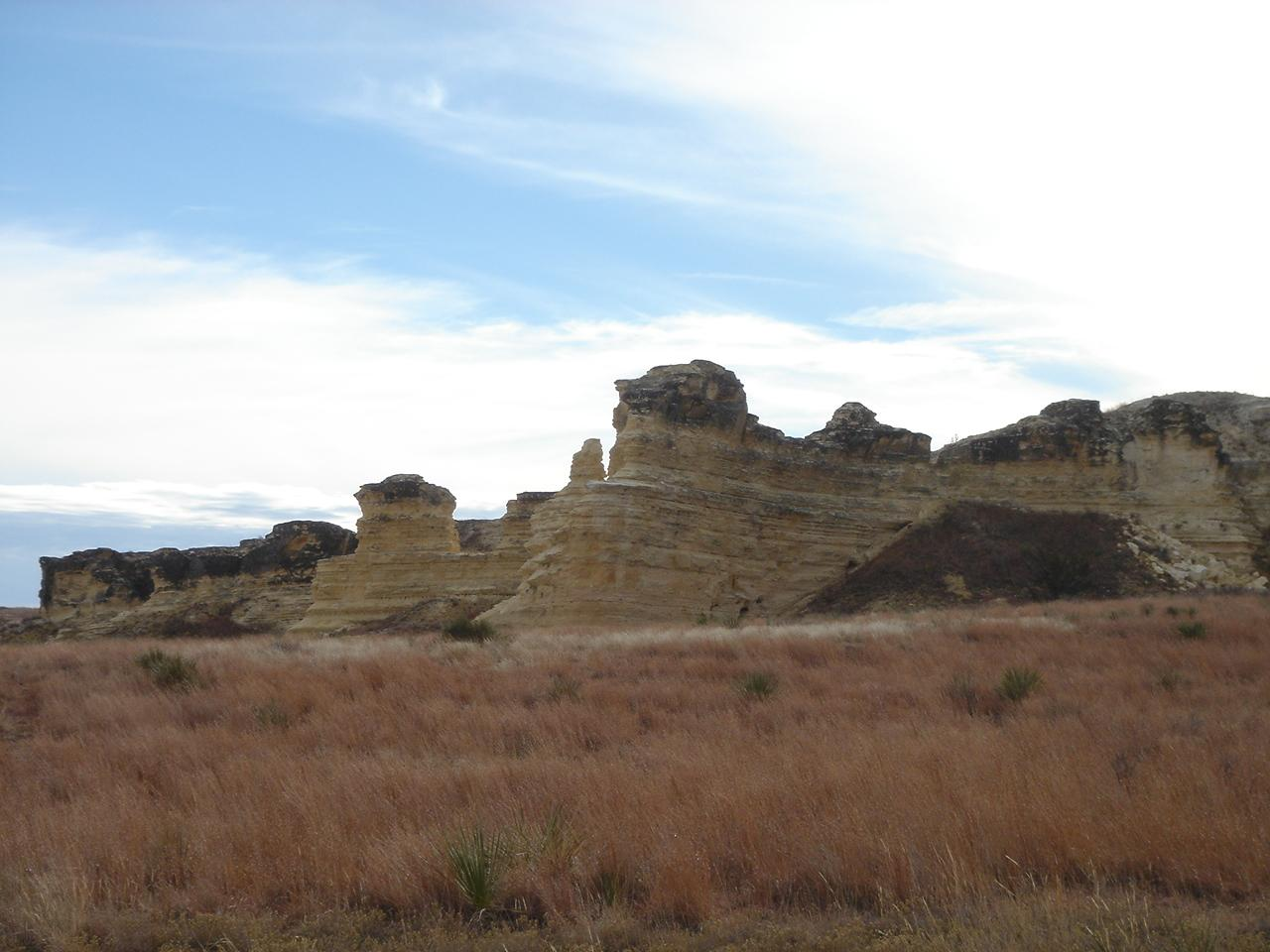

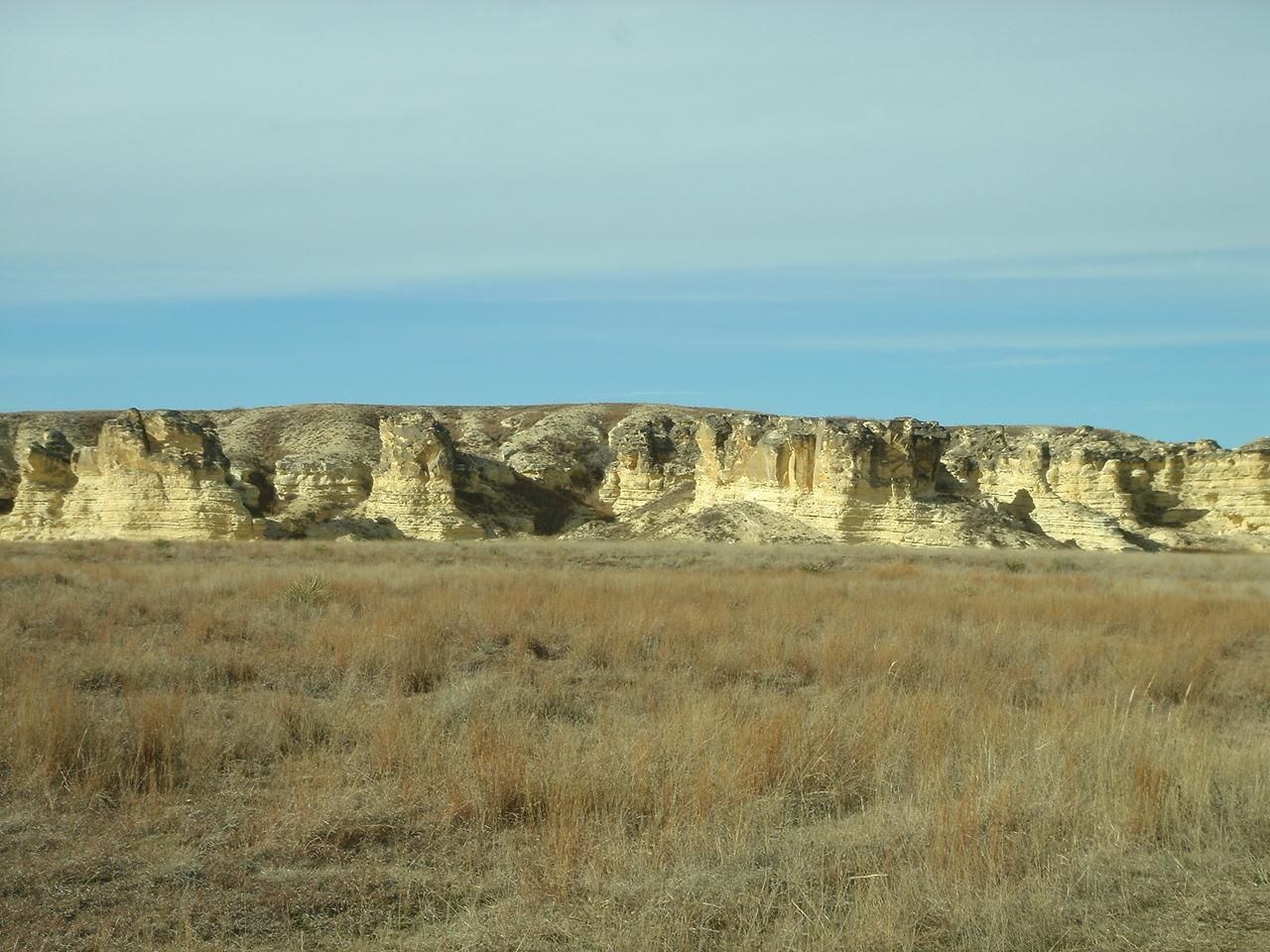

== See also ==
- Dry counties
- Iaceornis

Community information for Kansas

- Kansas locations by per capita income
- List of counties in Kansas
- List of townships in Kansas
- List of cities in Kansas
- List of unincorporated communities in Kansas
- List of ghost towns in Kansas
