= Dighton USD 482 =

Public school district in Dighton, Kansas

Address
- 200 S. Wichita Ave. Dighton, Kansas, 67839; United States
- Coordinates: 38°28′50″N 100°27′38″W

District information
- Type: Public
- Grades: K to 12

Other information
- Website: usd482.org

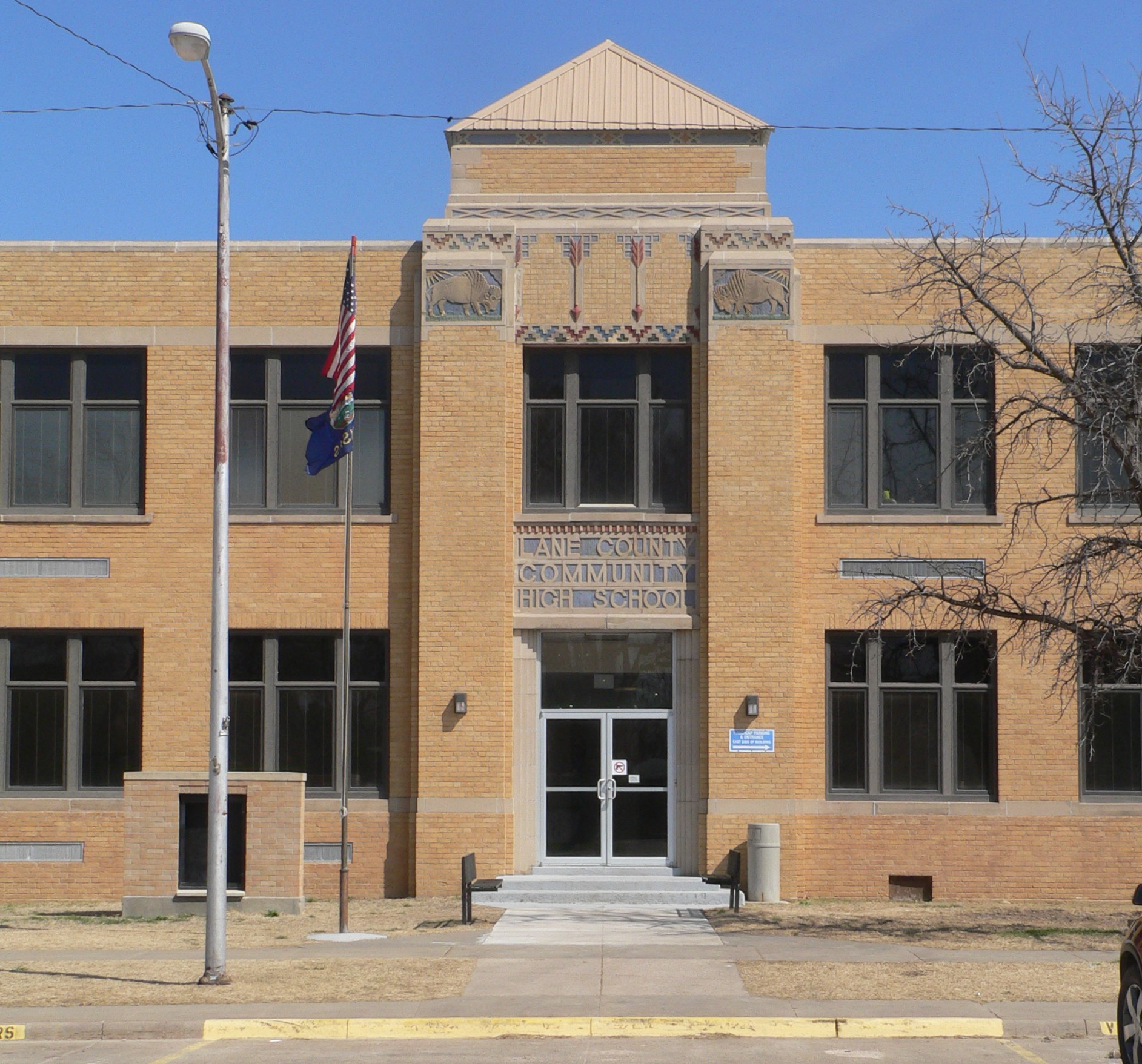
Dighton High School (2015)

Dighton USD 482 is a public unified school district headquartered in Dighton, Kansas, United States. The district includes the communities of Dighton, Alamota, Amy, Pendennis, Shields, and nearby rural areas.

== Schools ==
The school district operates the following schools:

- Dighton High School (junior-senior high)
- Dighton Elementary School

It also maintains the PBL Academy program.

== See also ==
- Kansas State Department of Education
- Kansas State High School Activities Association
- List of high schools in Kansas
- List of unified school districts in Kansas
