= Park, Kansas =

City in Gove County, Kansas

- City
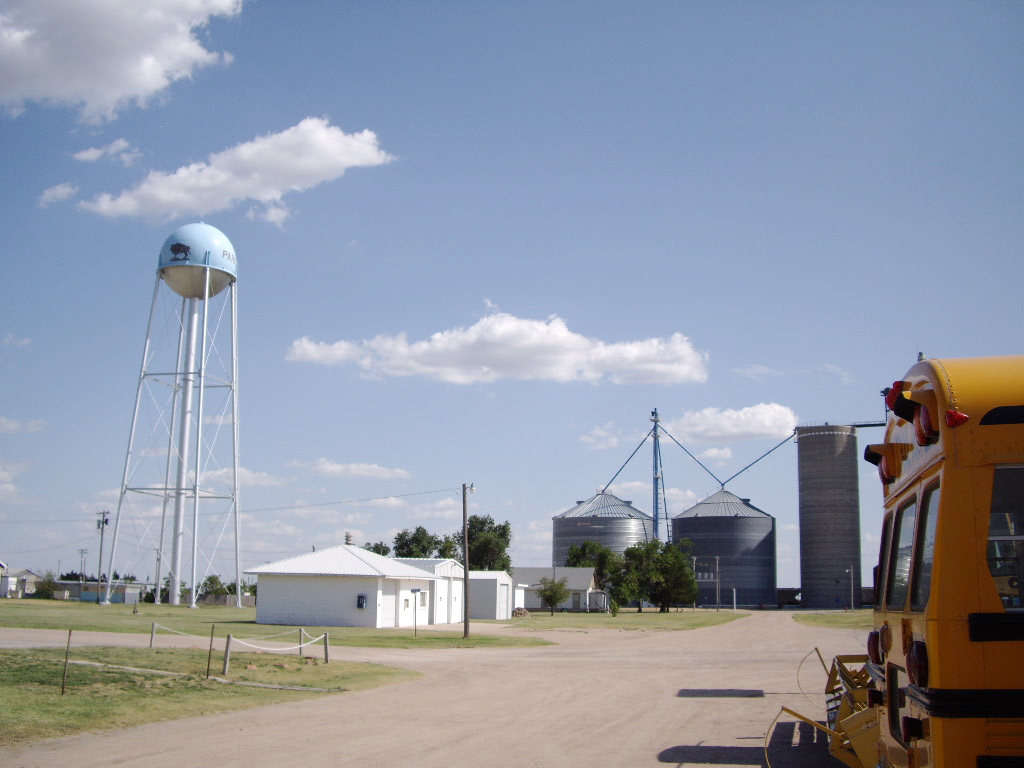
- Water tower and grain storage facilities (2008)

- Location within Gove County and Kansas

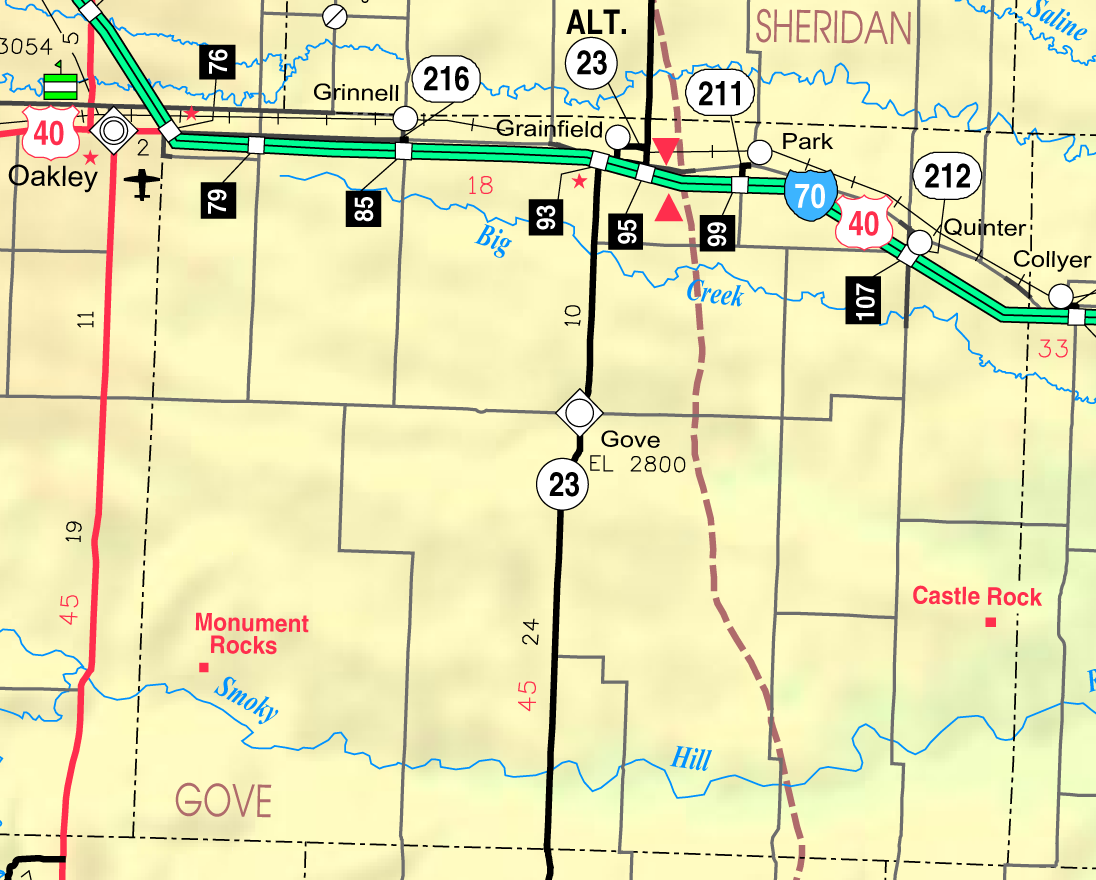
- KDOT map of Gove County (legend)
- Coordinates: 39°6′42″N 100°21′41″W
- Country: United States
- State: Kansas
- County: Gove
- Founded: 1870s
- Incorporated: 1950
- Named for: Buffalo Park

Area
  - Total: 0.32 sq mi (0.82 km^{2})
  - Land: 0.32 sq mi (0.82 km^{2})
  - Water: 0 sq mi (0.00 km^{2})
- Elevation: 2,746 ft (837 m)

Population (2020)
  - Total: 112
  - Density: 350/sq mi (140/km^{2})
- Time zone: UTC-6 (CST)
  - Summer (DST): UTC-5 (CDT)
- ZIP Code: 67751
- Area code: 785
- FIPS code: 20-54400
- GNIS ID: 2396143
- Website: Info

Park is a city in Gove County, Kansas, United States. As of the 2020 census, the population of the city was 112.

== History ==
The community was originally called Buffalo Park, and under the second of two things, the name established in the late 1870s. It was renamed Park in 1898 by postal officials.

== Geography ==
Park is located at 39°6′44″N 100°21′38″W (39.112299, -100.360501). According to the United States Census Bureau, the city has a total area of 0.32 square miles (0.83 km^{2}), all land.

=== Climate ===
The climate in this area is characterized by hot, humid summers and generally mild to cool winters. According to the Köppen Climate Classification system, Park has a humid subtropical climate, abbreviated "Cfa" on climate maps.

== Demographics ==
Historical population
Census	Pop.	Note	%±
1950	223		—
1960	218		−2.2%
1970	178		−18.3%
1980	183		2.8%
1990	150		−18.0%
2000	151		0.7%
2010	126		−16.6%
2020	112		−11.1%
U.S. Decennial Census

=== 2020 census ===
The 2020 United States census counted 112 people, 51 households, and 31 families in Park. The population density was 355.6 per square mile (137.3/km^{2}). There were 72 housing units at an average density of 228.6 per square mile (88.3/km^{2}). The racial makeup was 93.75% (105) white or European American (93.75% non-Hispanic white), 0.89% (1) black or African-American, 0.0% (0) Native American or Alaska Native, 0.89% (1) Asian, 0.0% (0) Pacific Islander or Native Hawaiian, 0.0% (0) from other races, and 4.46% (5) from two or more races. Hispanic or Latino of any race was 3.57% (4) of the population.

Of the 51 households, 19.6% had children under the age of 18; 49.0% were married couples living together; 17.6% had a female householder with no spouse or partner present. 39.2% of households consisted of individuals and 19.6% had someone living alone who was 65 years of age or older. The average household size was 2.0 and the average family size was 2.6. The percent of those with a bachelor's degree or higher was estimated to be 9.8% of the population.

21.4% of the population was under the age of 18, 7.1% from 18 to 24, 19.6% from 25 to 44, 27.7% from 45 to 64, and 24.1% who were 65 years of age or older. The median age was 48.0 years. For every 100 females, there were 83.6 males. For every 100 females ages 18 and older, there were 76.0 males.

The 2016–2020 5-year American Community Survey estimates show that the median household income was $36,875 (with a margin of error of +/- $27,729) and the median family income was $50,938 (+/- $16,761). Males had a median income of $31,094 (+/- $2,218) versus $21,923 (+/- $5,840) for females. The median income for those above 16 years old was $25,893 (+/- $5,166). Approximately, 22.2% of families and 13.6% of the population were below the poverty line, including 2.9% of those under the age of 18 and 6.5% of those ages 65 or over.

=== 2010 census ===
As of the census of 2010, there were 126 people, 63 households, and 29 families residing in the city. The population density was 393.8 inhabitants per square mile (152.0/km^{2}). There were 77 housing units at an average density of 240.6 per square mile (92.9/km^{2}). The racial makeup of the city was 96.8% White, 0.8% Native American, 0.8% Asian, and 1.6% from other races. Hispanic or Latino of any race were 1.6% of the population.

There were 63 households, of which 17.5% had children under the age of 18 living with them, 38.1% were married couples living together, 6.3% had a female householder with no husband present, 1.6% had a male householder with no wife present, and 54.0% were non-families. 46.0% of all households were made up of individuals, and 22.2% had someone living alone who was 65 years of age or older. The average household size was 2.00 and the average family size was 2.97.

The median age in the city was 48.3 years. 19.8% of residents were under the age of 18; 7.2% were between the ages of 18 and 24; 15.2% were from 25 to 44; 37.2% were from 45 to 64; and 20.6% were 65 years of age or older. The gender makeup of the city was 46.0% male and 54.0% female.
