= Lewis Township, Kansas =

Lewis Township
- Township
- Location in Gove County
- Coordinates: 38°47′13″N 100°42′27″W
- Country: United States
- State: Kansas
- County: Gove

Area
  - Total: 143.65 sq mi (372.05 km^{2})
  - Land: 143.65 sq mi (372.05 km^{2})
  - Water: 0 sq mi (0 km^{2}) 0%
- Elevation: 2,717 ft (828 m)

Population (2020)
  - Total: 12
  - Density: 0.084/sq mi (0.032/km^{2})
- GNIS feature ID: 0471393

Lewis Township is a township in Gove County, Kansas, United States. As of the 2020 census, its population was 12.

== Geography ==
Lewis Township covers an area of 143.65 square miles (372.1 km^{2}) and contains no incorporated settlements. According to the USGS, it contains two cemeteries: Pyramid View and Swedish Lutheran.

The stream of Hell Creek runs through this township.
