= Pendennis, Kansas =

Unincorporated community in Lane County, Kansas

Coordinates: 38.640°N 100.336°W

Pendennis is an unincorporated community in Lane County, Kansas, United States.

== History ==
It was named after the novel Pendennis.

A post office was opened in Pendennis in 1892 and remained in operation until it was discontinued in 1957.

== Education ==
The community is served by Dighton USD 482 public school district.
