= Amy, Kansas =

Unincorporated community in Lane County, Kansas

Coordinates: 38°28′55″N 100°36′07″W

Amy is an unincorporated community in Lane County, Kansas, United States.

== History ==
A post office was opened in Amy in 1906, and remained in operation until it was discontinued in 1954.

== Education ==
The community is served by Dighton USD 482 public school district.
