= Alamota, Kansas =

Unincorporated community in Lane County, Kansas

Coordinates: 38°27′40″N 100°18′36″W

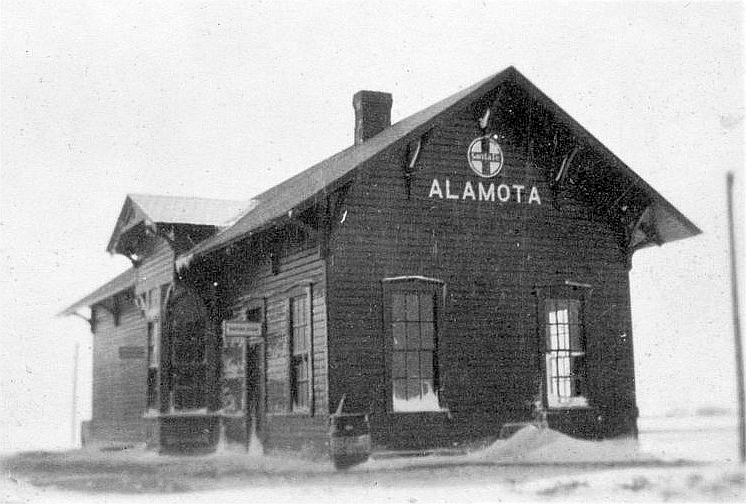
Atchison, Topeka and Santa Fe Railway depot in Alamota, circa 1890-1919

Alamota is an unincorporated community in Lane County, Kansas, United States.

== History ==
Alamota was a station and shipping point on a division of the Atchison, Topeka and Santa Fe Railway.

A post office was established in Alamota in 1877, closed in 1894, reopened in 1903, and closed permanently in 1992.

== Education ==
The community is served by Dighton USD 482 public school district.
