= Gove City, Kansas =

City in Gove County, Kansas

- City and County seat
- Location within Gove County and Kansas

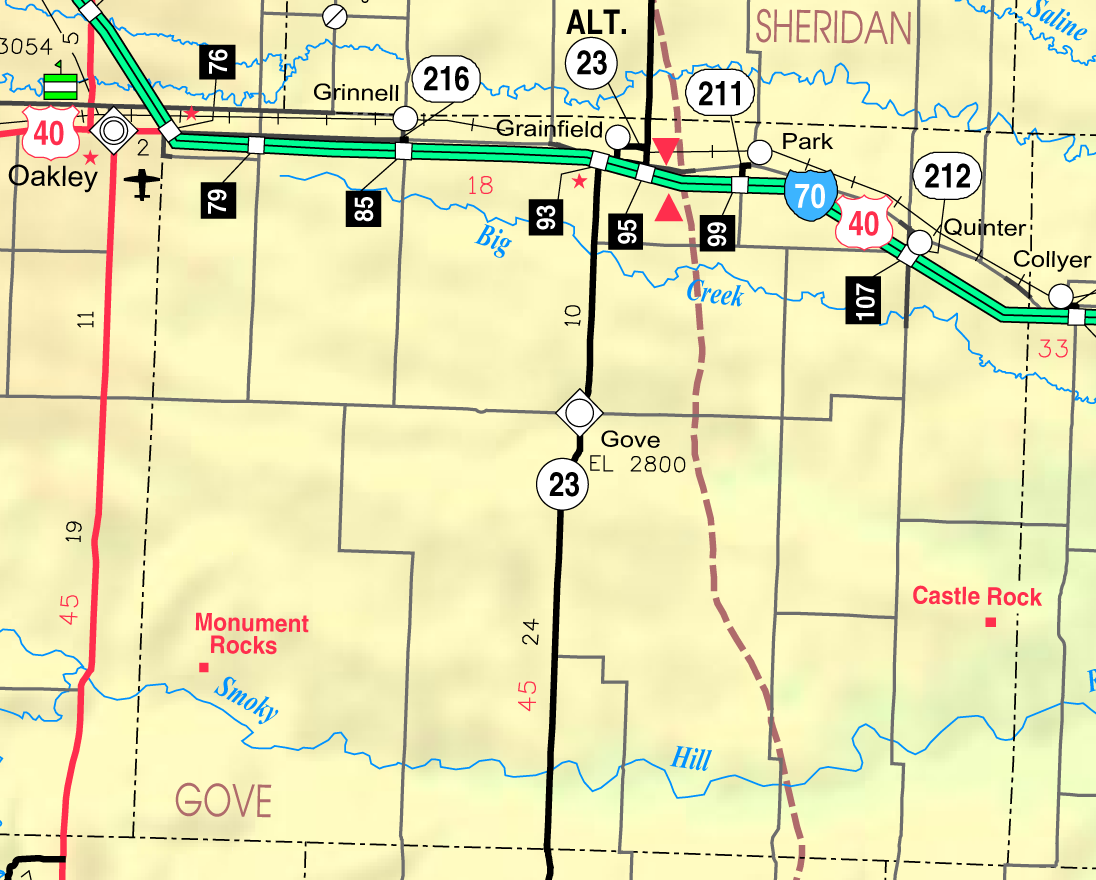
- KDOT map of Gove County (legend)
- Coordinates: 38°57′34″N 100°29′13″W
- Country: United States
- State: Kansas
- County: Gove
- Founded: 1885
- Incorporated: 1888
- Named for: Grenville Gove

Area
  - Total: 0.24 sq mi (0.63 km^{2})
  - Land: 0.24 sq mi (0.63 km^{2})
  - Water: 0 sq mi (0.00 km^{2})
- Elevation: 2,638 ft (804 m)

Population (2020)
  - Total: 80
  - Density: 330/sq mi (130/km^{2})
- Time zone: UTC-6 (CST)
  - Summer (DST): UTC-5 (CDT)
- ZIP Code: 67736
- Area code: 785
- FIPS code: 20-27050
- GNIS ID: 2394937

Gove City, more commonly known as Gove, is a city in and the county seat of Gove County, Kansas, United States. As of the 2020 census, the population of the city was 80.

== History ==
Gove City was founded in 1885. It was designated county seat in 1886, and incorporated in 1888. It is named for Grenville Gove, member of the 11th Kansas Cavalry Regiment.

== Geography ==
Gove City is located at 38°57′34″N 100°29′14″W (38.959576, -100.487316). According to the United States Census Bureau, the city has a total area of 0.25 square miles (0.65 km^{2}), all land.

=== Climate ===
The climate in this area is characterized by hot, humid summers and generally mild to cool winters. According to the Köppen Climate Classification system, Gove City has a humid subtropical climate, abbreviated "Cfa" on climate maps.

Climate data for Gove City, Kansas, 1991–2020 normals, extremes 1981–present
Month	Jan	Feb	Mar	Apr	May	Jun	Jul	Aug	Sep	Oct	Nov	Dec	Year
Record high °F (°C)	81.6 (27.6)	85.0 (29.4)	95.2 (35.1)	99.0 (37.2)	100.2 (37.9)	111.8 (44.3)	106.8 (41.6)	106.4 (41.3)	103.9 (39.9)	95.9 (35.5)	87.8 (31.0)	78.1 (25.6)	111.8 (44.3)
Mean maximum °F (°C)	65.9 (18.8)	71.4 (21.9)	81.3 (27.4)	87.4 (30.8)	93.4 (34.1)	100.8 (38.2)	102.6 (39.2)	100.7 (38.2)	97.0 (36.1)	90.4 (32.4)	77.2 (25.1)	65.4 (18.6)	103.7 (39.8)
Mean daily maximum °F (°C)	42.8 (6.0)	46.3 (7.9)	56.8 (13.8)	65.5 (18.6)	75.2 (24.0)	86.7 (30.4)	91.7 (33.2)	89.2 (31.8)	81.7 (27.6)	68.7 (20.4)	55.0 (12.8)	44.0 (6.7)	67.0 (19.4)
Daily mean °F (°C)	29.8 (−1.2)	32.8 (0.4)	42.2 (5.7)	51.1 (10.6)	61.7 (16.5)	73.0 (22.8)	78.2 (25.7)	75.9 (24.4)	67.6 (19.8)	54.2 (12.3)	41.2 (5.1)	31.4 (−0.3)	53.3 (11.8)
Mean daily minimum °F (°C)	16.8 (−8.4)	19.4 (−7.0)	27.7 (−2.4)	36.7 (2.6)	48.2 (9.0)	59.3 (15.2)	64.6 (18.1)	62.5 (16.9)	53.4 (11.9)	39.7 (4.3)	27.4 (−2.6)	18.8 (−7.3)	39.5 (4.2)
Mean minimum °F (°C)	−0.2 (−17.9)	3.1 (−16.1)	10.9 (−11.7)	22.5 (−5.3)	34.4 (1.3)	47.8 (8.8)	55.8 (13.2)	53.6 (12.0)	39.4 (4.1)	23.4 (−4.8)	11.6 (−11.3)	2.1 (−16.6)	−5.7 (−20.9)
Record low °F (°C)	−15.8 (−26.6)	−20.7 (−29.3)	−8.3 (−22.4)	10.5 (−11.9)	27.7 (−2.4)	36.3 (2.4)	46.7 (8.2)	46.3 (7.9)	25.2 (−3.8)	8.3 (−13.2)	−1.9 (−18.8)	−23.8 (−31.0)	−23.8 (−31.0)
Average precipitation inches (mm)	0.45 (11)	0.62 (16)	1.29 (33)	2.06 (52)	3.34 (85)	2.73 (69)	3.81 (97)	2.82 (72)	1.85 (47)	1.74 (44)	0.66 (17)	0.72 (18)	22.09 (561)
Average precipitation days (≥ 0.01 in)	2.9	3.6	5.4	7.3	9.3	8.3	8.8	8.4	5.2	5.1	3.8	3.5	71.6
Source: PRISM

== Demographics ==
Historical population
Census	Pop.	Note	%±
1890	118		—
1900	162		37.3%
1910	196		21.0%
1920	132		−32.7%
1930	241		82.6%
1940	284		17.8%
1950	206		−27.5%
1960	228		10.7%
1970	172		−24.6%
1980	148		−14.0%
1990	103		−30.4%
2000	105		1.9%
2010	80		−23.8%
2020	80		0.0%
U.S. Decennial Census

=== 2020 census ===
The 2020 United States census counted 80 people, 36 households, and 19 families in Gove City. The population density was 329.2 per square mile (127.1/km^{2}). There were 47 housing units at an average density of 193.4 per square mile (74.7/km^{2}). The racial makeup was 90.0% (72) white or European American (90.0% non-Hispanic white), 0.0% (0) black or African-American, 0.0% (0) Native American or Alaska Native, 0.0% (0) Asian, 0.0% (0) Pacific Islander or Native Hawaiian, 0.0% (0) from other races, and 10.0% (8) from two or more races. Hispanic or Latino of any race was 0.0% (0) of the population.

Of the 36 households, 13.9% had children under the age of 18; 50.0% were married couples living together; 22.2% had a female householder with no spouse or partner present. 36.1% of households consisted of individuals and 11.1% had someone living alone who was 65 years of age or older. The average household size was 2.1 and the average family size was 2.9. The percent of those with a bachelor's degree or higher was estimated to be 12.5% of the population.

25.0% of the population was under the age of 18, 7.5% from 18 to 24, 20.0% from 25 to 44, 30.0% from 45 to 64, and 17.5% who were 65 years of age or older. The median age was 39.7 years. For every 100 females, there were 90.5 males. For every 100 females ages 18 and older, there were 81.8 males.

The 2016–2020 5-year American Community Survey estimates show that the median household income was $29,500 (with a margin of error of +/- $29,417) and the median family income was $61,250 (+/- $36,148). Males had a median income of $22,917 (+/- $9,034). The median income for those above 16 years old was $21,250 (+/- $11,778). Approximately, 25.0% of families and 30.3% of the population were below the poverty line, including 42.9% of those under the age of 18 and 8.3% of those ages 65 or over.

=== 2010 census ===
As of the census of 2010, there were 80 people, 37 households, and 22 families residing in the city. The population density was 320.0 inhabitants per square mile (123.6/km^{2}). There were 56 housing units at an average density of 224.0 per square mile (86.5/km^{2}). The racial makeup of the city was 97.5% White and 2.5% from two or more races.

There were 37 households, of which 21.6% had children under the age of 18 living with them, 51.4% were married couples living together, 2.7% had a female householder with no husband present, 5.4% had a male householder with no wife present, and 40.5% were non-families. 35.1% of all households were made up of individuals, and 18.9% had someone living alone who was 65 years of age or older. The average household size was 2.16 and the average family size was 2.86.

The median age in the city was 48 years. 22.5% of residents were under the age of 18; 5.1% were between the ages of 18 and 24; 18.9% were from 25 to 44; 31.4% were from 45 to 64; and 22.5% were 65 years of age or older. The gender makeup of the city was 48.8% male and 51.3% female.

== Education ==
Gove is a part of Wheatland USD 292 public school district. The Wheatland High School mascot is a Thunderhawk.

Gove High School was closed through school unification. The Gove High School team name was Gove Panthers.
