= Shields, Kansas =

Unincorporated community in Lane County, Kansas

Coordinates: 38°36′56″N 100°26′42″W

Shields is an unincorporated community in Lane County, Kansas, United States.

== History ==
A post office was opened in Shields in 1887, and remained in operation until it was discontinued in 1994.

== Education ==
The community is served by Dighton USD 482 public school district.
