= Larrabee Township, Kansas =

Larrabee Township
- Township
- Location in Gove County
- Coordinates: 38°47′06″N 100°15′49″W
- Country: United States
- State: Kansas
- County: Gove

Area
  - Total: 143.39 sq mi (371.39 km^{2})
  - Land: 143.38 sq mi (371.34 km^{2})
  - Water: 0.019 sq mi (0.05 km^{2}) 0.01%
- Elevation: 2,360 ft (720 m)

Population (2020)
  - Total: 58
  - Density: 0.40/sq mi (0.16/km^{2})
- GNIS feature ID: 0471401

Larrabee Township is a township in Gove County, Kansas, United States. As of the 2020 census, its population was 58.

== Geography ==
Larrabee Township covers an area of 143.39 square miles (371.4 km^{2}) and contains no incorporated settlements. According to the USGS, it contains two cemeteries: Alanthus and Morning Star.

The streams of Big Windy Creek, Indian Creek and Sand Creek run through this township.

== Transportation ==
Larrabee Township contains one airport or landing strip, Castle Rock Ranch Airport.
