= Jerome Township, Kansas =

Jerome Township
- Township
- Location in Gove County
- Coordinates: 38°47′09″N 100°29′04″W
- Country: United States
- State: Kansas
- County: Gove

Area
  - Total: 142.97 sq mi (370.28 km^{2})
  - Land: 142.95 sq mi (370.25 km^{2})
  - Water: 0.0077 sq mi (0.02 km^{2}) 0.01%
- Elevation: 2,585 ft (788 m)

Population (2020)
  - Total: 99
  - Density: 0.69/sq mi (0.27/km^{2})
- GNIS feature ID: 0471397

Jerome Township is a township in Gove County, Kansas, United States. As of the 2020 census, its population was 99.

== Geography ==
Jerome Township covers an area of 142.96 square miles (370.3 km^{2}) and contains no incorporated settlements.

The streams of Cheyenne Creek and Plum Creek run through this township.

== Transportation ==
Jerome Township contains three airports or landing strips: Beesley Farms Airport, Lundgren Hereford Ranch Airport and Tustin Airport.
