= K-147 (Kansas highway) =

State highway in Kansas, U.S.

K-147
- Smoky Valley Scenic Byway
- K-147 highlighted in red

Route information
- Maintained by KDOT
- Length: 25.930 mi (41.730 km)
- Existed: August 1, 1956–present

Major junctions
- South end: K-4 east of Brownell
- I-70 / US-40 near Ogallah
- North end: Centre Street in Ogallah

Location
- Country: United States
- State: Kansas
- Counties: Ness, Trego

Highway system
- Kansas State Highway System; Interstate; US; State; Spurs
← K-146	→ K-148

K-147 is an approximately 26-mile-long (42 km) north–south state highway in west-central Kansas. It runs from K-4 east of Brownell to Ogallah, just north of the junction with Interstate 70 (I-70) and U.S. Route 40 (US-40). K-147 serves Cedar Bluff State Park via locally maintained CC Road. The highway south of I-70 and US-40 is part of the Smoky Valley Scenic Byway. The highway travels through a mix of flat farmlands and rolling hills covered with grasslands. K-147 is a two-lane highway its entire length.

K-147 was first established on August 1, 1956, from the Trego County line north to US-40; on June 12, 1957, it was extended south to K-4. Then by 1960, I-70 was complete from south of Collyer to southeast of Ogallah. At that time, US-40 was re-routed along I-70, and K-147 was extended east along old US-40 to its present northern terminus.

== Route description ==
From its southern terminus at K-4 east of Brownell, K-147 heads northward four miles (6.4 km) through flat rural farmlands then crosses into Trego County. From the county line, the highway continues north for roughly two miles (3.2 km), and intersects CC Road (RS-1979), which leads west to Cedar Bluff State Park. At this point the landscape transitions to rolling hills covered with grasslands. The roadway continues for about 2.1 miles (3.4 km), makes a series of curves, and then crosses the bridge over Smoky Hill River and the Cedar Bluff Dam. After crossing the dam it continues north through flat grasslands for about 4.7 miles (7.6 km) then curves west at South Road (RS-907). K-147 continues for about .75 miles (1.21 km), then turns north again at South Road (RS-906). It continues for roughly 2.8 miles (4.5 km) then crosses Big Creek. The highway continues north from here through flat rural farmlands for roughly 5.2 miles (8.4 km), then intersects exit 135 of I-70 and US-40, at a diamond interchange. Past I-70 and US-40, K-147 continues north a short distance then turns east onto old US-40. The highway continues for .5 miles (0.80 km) then ends in Ogallah at Centre Street. Past its terminus in Ogallah, it continues as locally maintained old US-40.

In 2018, per traffic counts from the Kansas Department of Transportation, on average traffic varied from 145 vehicles per day near the southern terminus to 275 vehicles per day between I-70 and its northern terminus. K-147 is two lanes and undivided for its entire length. The section of K-147 between its southern terminus to I-70 and US-40 is part of the Smoky Valley Scenic Byway. K-147 is not included in the National Highway System, a system of highways important to the nation's defense, economy, and mobility, but K-147 does connect to the National Highway System at its junction with I-70 and US-40.

== History ==
=== Early roads ===
Before state highways were numbered in Kansas, there were auto trails, which were an informal network of marked routes that existed in the United States and Canada in the early part of the 20th century. The southern terminus of K-147 (K-4) was part of the Beeline Highway, and the northern terminus was part of the Golden Belt Highway.

=== Establishment and realignments ===
K-147 was first approved in a December 20, 1955 resolution, as soon as Ness and Trego counties had brought the roadway up to state highway standards. By August 1956, Trego County had brought the highway up to state highway standards, and K-147 was established from the Trego County line north to US-40 in an August 1, 1956 resolution. Then in a June 12, 1957 resolution, it was extended south to K-4, as Ness County had finished required projects. In a February 26, 1958 resolution, a new roadway was approved to be built from south of Collyer to southeast of Ogallah, which would be the new I-70. US-40 was re-routed along I-70 as well, and by 1960, K-147 was extended 0.1 miles (160 m) east to its present northern terminus.

On June 26, 2019, KDOT closed the bridge that carries K-147 over the Cedar Bluff Reservoir spillway (Smoky Hill River). The steel arch bridge, originally built in 1952, was closed due to safety concerns about structural deficiencies that were found during a recent inspection. Rust found in the bridge deck was not allowing the bridge to expand and contract properly. While the bridge was closed, traffic was detoured using I-70, US-283 and K-4. Construction on the new $2.2 million bridge began in early February 2020. The project, carried out by Wildcat Construction of Wichita, was completed and opened to traffic on August 18, 2020.

== Major intersections ==
County	Location	mi	km	Destinations	Notes
Ness	Waring Township	0.000	0.000	K-4 – Brownell, LaCrosse	Southern terminus
Trego	Riverside Township	5.936	9.553	CC Road (RS-1979) – Cedar Bluff State Park	
Trego	Ogallah Township	24.906	40.082	I-70 / US-40 – Limon, Hays	I-70 exit 135; diamond interchange
Trego	Ogallah	25.930	41.730	Centre Street / Old US-40	Northern terminus; road continues east as Old US-40 (unpaved)
1.000 mi = 1.609 km; 1.000 km = 0.621 mi
