= Ogallah Township, Kansas =

Township in Trego County, Kansas, U.S.

Ogallah Township
- Township
- Location within Trego County
- Coordinates: 38.902384°N 99.680505°W
- Country: United States
- State: Kansas
- County: Trego
- Established: 1879

Area
  - Total: 300.391 sq mi (778.01 km^{2})
  - Land: 294.817 sq mi (763.57 km^{2})
  - Water: 5.574 sq mi (14.44 km^{2}) 1.86%

Population (2020)
  - Total: 329
  - Density: 1.12/sq mi (0.431/km^{2})
- Time zone: UTC-6 (CST)
  - Summer (DST): UTC-5 (CDT)
- Area code: 785
- GNIS feature ID: 485296

Ogallah Township is a township in Trego County, Kansas, United States. As of the 2020 census, its population was 329.

== History ==
The townships in Trego County have been through many border and land changes throughout their history. The first three townships were created on June 26, 1879. Ogallah Township was the easternmost third of the county. By the 1880s, Glencoe Township was created from eastern parts of Ogallah Township. Riverside Township would be created from southern Glencoe and Ogallah Township, and Ogallah Township would also annex northern parts of Glencoe Township. In the 2020s, Glencoe Township and Riverside Township would be merged back into Ogallah Township.

== Geography ==
Ogallah Township covers an area of 300.391 square miles (778.01 km^{2}), 1.86% of it water. Part of Cedar Bluff Reservoir and most of Cedar Bluff State Park lie within the township. The Smoky Hill River, Big Creek, and Saline River flows through it, as well as Page Creek, Spring Creek, and Shaw Creek.

=== Communities ===
- Ogallah
- Riga

=== Adjacent townships ===
Morlan Township, Graham County
		north	northeast	Township 9, Rooks County
WaKeeney Township, Trego County	west	self	east	Buckeye Township, Ellis County
		south	southeast	Big Creek Township, Ellis County
Waring Township, Ness County

== Transportation ==
=== Major highways ===
- I-70
- US-40
- K-147

== Demographics ==
As of the 2020 census, the township had a population of 329, giving a population density of 1.12 people per square mile (0.43 people/km^{2}). The racial makeup of the township was 95.7% White, 0.3% Black or African American, 0.3% Asian, 0.3% from some other race, and 3.3% from two or more races. Hispanics or Latinos of any race were 1.2% of the population.

The 2020–2024 American Community Survey estimated that the township contained 168 households and 292 housing units.
