= Wilcox, Kansas =

Ghost town in Trego County, Kansas

- Ghost town
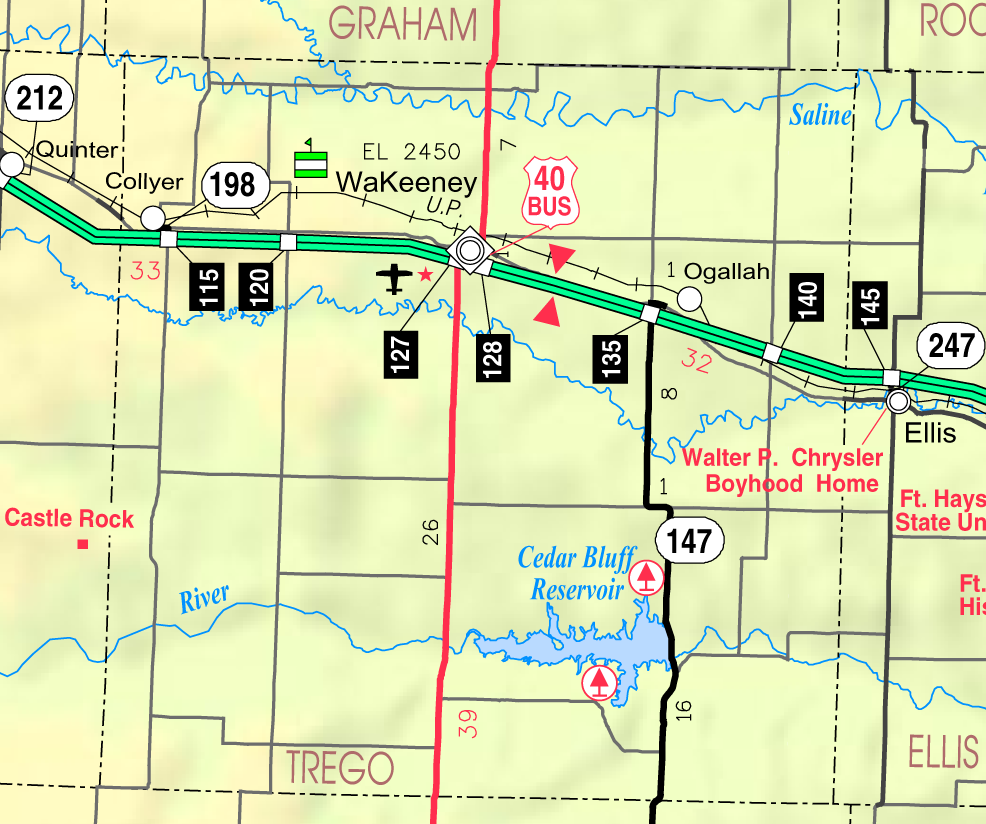
- KDOT map of Trego County (legend)

- Location within Kansas Location within the United States
- Coordinates: 38°47′52″N 99°53′31″W
- Country: United States
- State: Kansas
- County: Trego
- Elevation: 2,228 ft (679 m)

Population
  - Total: 0
- Time zone: UTC-6 (CST)
  - Summer (DST): UTC-5 (CDT)
- Area code: 785
- GNIS ID: 482669

Wilcox is a ghost town in Wilcox Township of Trego County, Kansas, United States.

== History ==
Wilcox was issued a post office in 1879. The post office was discontinued in 1896.

The Wilcox one room school building still stands in good condition. The roof of the school was replaced after 2009.
