= Ogallah, Kansas =

Unincorporated community in Trego County, Kansas, United States

- Unincorporated community and CDP
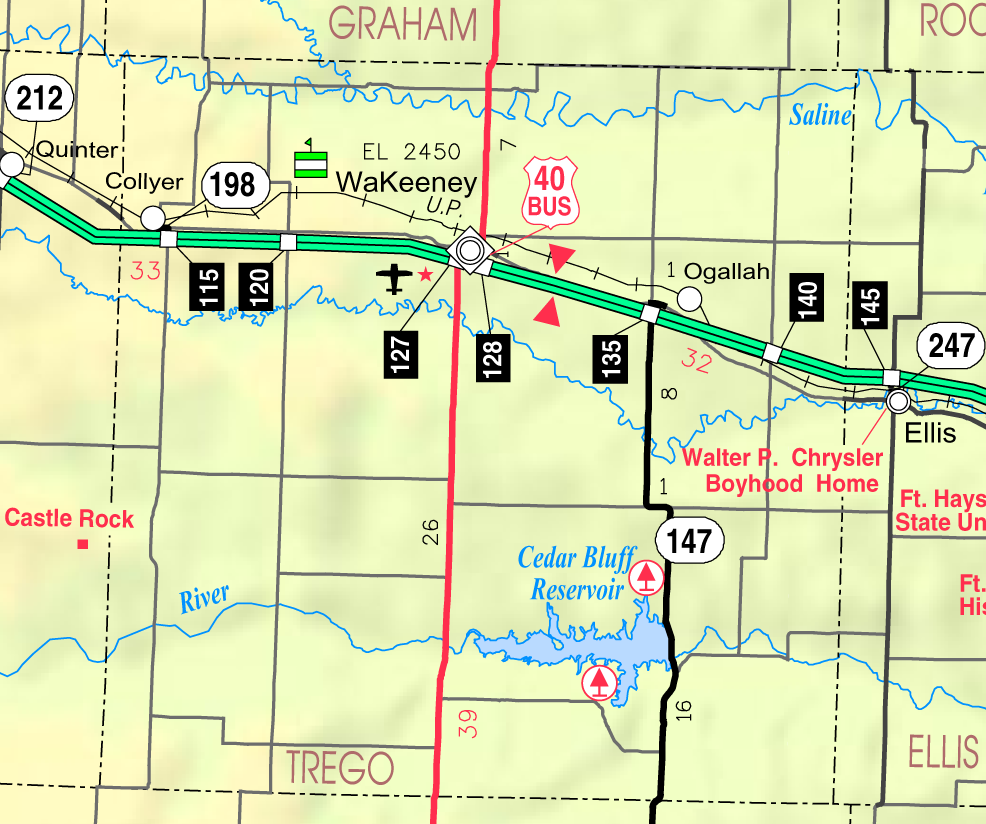
- KDOT map of Trego County (legend)

- Location within Kansas Location within the United States
- Coordinates: 38°59′29″N 99°43′56″W
- Country: United States
- State: Kansas
- County: Trego
- Founded: 1870s
- Named for: Oglala Lakota tribe
- Elevation: 2,336 ft (712 m)

Population (2020)
  - Total: 28
- Time zone: UTC-6 (CST)
  - Summer (DST): UTC-5 (CDT)
- ZIP Code: 67656
- Area code: 785
- FIPS code: 20-52250
- GNIS ID: 485296

Ogallah is an unincorporated community and census-designated place (CDP) in Trego County, Kansas, United States. As of the 2020 census, the population was 28. It is located approximately 7 miles east of WaKeeney.

== History ==
Ogallah was named for the Oglala Lakota tribe.

The post office was established January 27, 1879.

== Geography ==
=== Climate ===
The climate in this area is characterized by hot, humid summers and generally mild to cool winters. According to the Köppen Climate Classification system, Ogallah has a humid subtropical climate, abbreviated "Cfa" on climate maps.

== Demographics ==
Historical population
Census	Pop.	Note	%±
2020	28		—
U.S. Decennial Census

== See also ==
- Cedar Bluff Reservoir and Cedar Bluff State Park
