= Brownell, Kansas =

City in Ness County, Kansas

- City
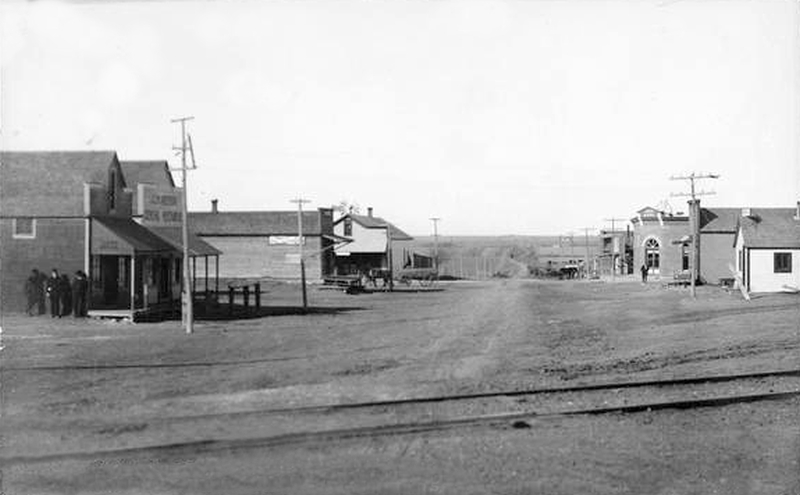
- Main Street, circa 1900

- Location within Ness County and Kansas

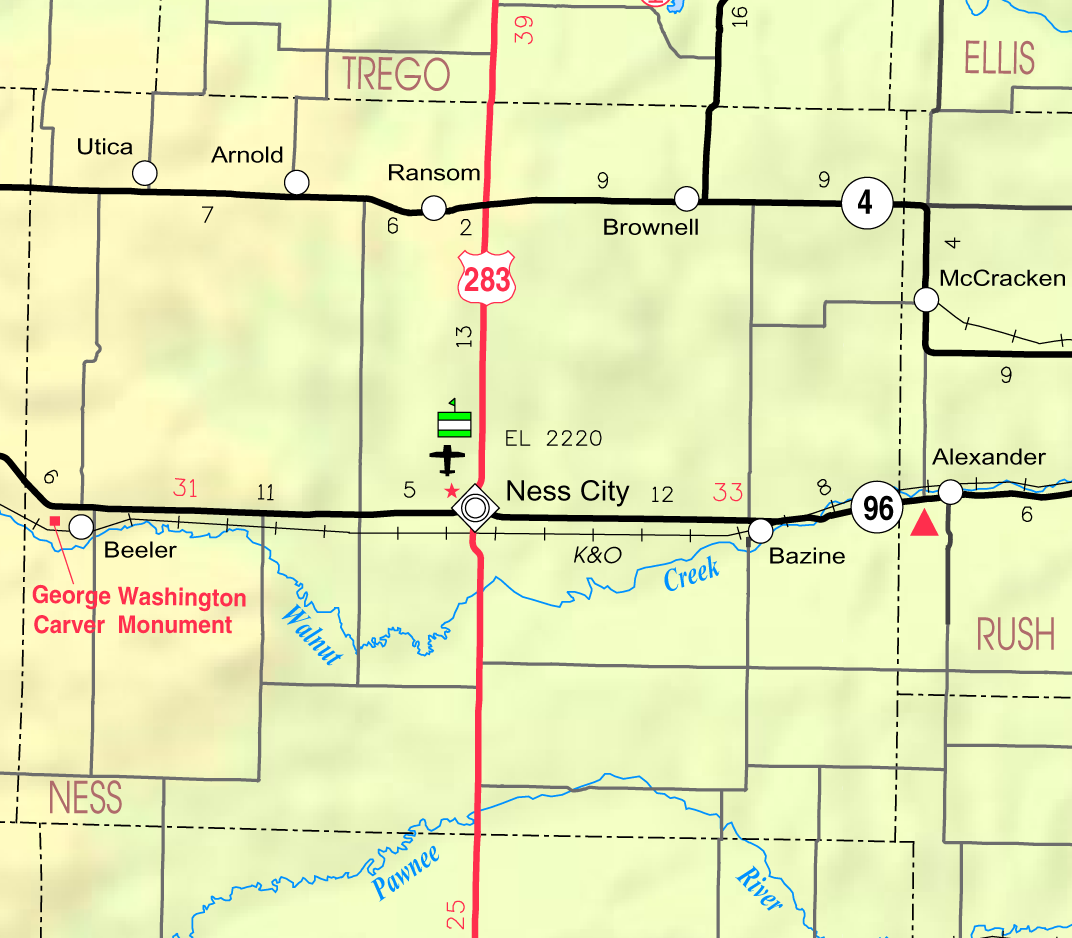
- KDOT map of Ness County (legend)
- Coordinates: 38°38′26″N 99°44′39″W
- Country: United States
- State: Kansas
- County: Ness
- Founded: 1880s
- Incorporated: 1927
- Named for: Mr. Brownell

Area
  - Total: 0.20 sq mi (0.51 km^{2})
  - Land: 0.20 sq mi (0.51 km^{2})
  - Water: 0 sq mi (0.00 km^{2})
- Elevation: 2,425 ft (739 m)

Population (2020)
  - Total: 23
  - Density: 120/sq mi (45/km^{2})
- Time zone: UTC-6 (CST)
  - Summer (DST): UTC-5 (CDT)
- ZIP Code: 67521
- Area code: 785
- FIPS code: 20-08675
- GNIS ID: 2393437

Brownell is a city in Ness County, Kansas, United States. As of the 2020 census, the population of the city was 23.

== History ==
Brownell was a station on the Missouri Pacific Railroad. The community was named for Mr. Brownell, a railroad official.

The first post office in Brownell was established in 1880, but the post office was called Vansburgh until 1888.

== Geography ==
According to the United States Census Bureau, the city has a total area of 0.20 square miles (0.52 km^{2}), all land.

=== Climate ===
The climate in this area is characterized by hot, humid summers and generally mild to cool winters. According to the Köppen Climate Classification system, Brownell has a humid subtropical climate, abbreviated "Cfa" on climate maps.

== Demographics ==
Historical population
Census	Pop.	Note	%±
1930	207		—
1940	162		−21.7%
1950	211		30.2%
1960	118		−44.1%
1970	98		−16.9%
1980	92		−6.1%
1990	44		−52.2%
2000	48		9.1%
2010	29		−39.6%
2020	23		−20.7%
U.S. Decennial Census

=== 2020 census ===
The 2020 United States census counted 23 people, 18 households, and 11 families in Brownell. The population density was 116.2 per square mile (44.9/km^{2}). There were 27 housing units at an average density of 136.4 per square mile (52.7/km^{2}). The racial makeup was 82.61% (19) white or European American (82.61% non-Hispanic white), 0.0% (0) black or African-American, 0.0% (0) Native American or Alaska Native, 0.0% (0) Asian, 0.0% (0) Pacific Islander or Native Hawaiian, 0.0% (0) from other races, and 17.39% (4) from two or more races. Hispanic or Latino of any race was 4.35% (1) of the population.

Of the 18 households, 38.9% had children under the age of 18; 44.4% were married couples living together; 33.3% had a female householder with no spouse or partner present. 27.8% of households consisted of individuals and 22.2% had someone living alone who was 65 years of age or older. The average household size was 2.8 and the average family size was 2.7.

8.7% of the population was under the age of 18, 13.0% from 18 to 24, 8.7% from 25 to 44, 30.4% from 45 to 64, and 39.1% who were 65 years of age or older. The median age was 56.5 years. For every 100 females, there were 76.9 males. For every 100 females ages 18 and older, there were 75.0 males.

=== 2010 census ===
As of the census of 2010, there were 29 people, 16 households, and 8 families residing in the city. The population density was 145.0 inhabitants per square mile (56.0/km^{2}). There were 38 housing units at an average density of 190.0 per square mile (73.4/km^{2}). The racial makeup of the city was 100.0% White.

There were 16 households, of which 12.5% had children under the age of 18 living with them, 50.0% were married couples living together, and 50.0% were non-families. 50.0% of all households were made up of individuals, and 18.8% had someone living alone who was 65 years of age or older. The average household size was 1.81 and the average family size was 2.63.

The median age in the city was 59.5 years. 17.2% of residents were under the age of 18; 0.0% were between the ages of 18 and 24; 10.3% were from 25 to 44; 37.8% were from 45 to 64; and 34.5% were 65 years of age or older. The gender makeup of the city was 58.6% male and 41.4% female.

== Education ==
The community is served by Western Plains USD 106 public school district. The Western Plains High School mascot is Bobcats.

Brownell became a part of the Ransom school district in 1960. The Brownell School closed in 1969. USD 106 formed in 2004 by the consolidation of Ransom USD 302 and Bazine USD 304.

== Parks and Recreation ==
- Cedar Bluff Reservoir and Cedar Bluff State Park

== Notable people ==
- Elon Hogsett, Major League Baseball pitcher
