= Banner, Kansas =

Ghost town in Trego County, Kansas

- Ghost town
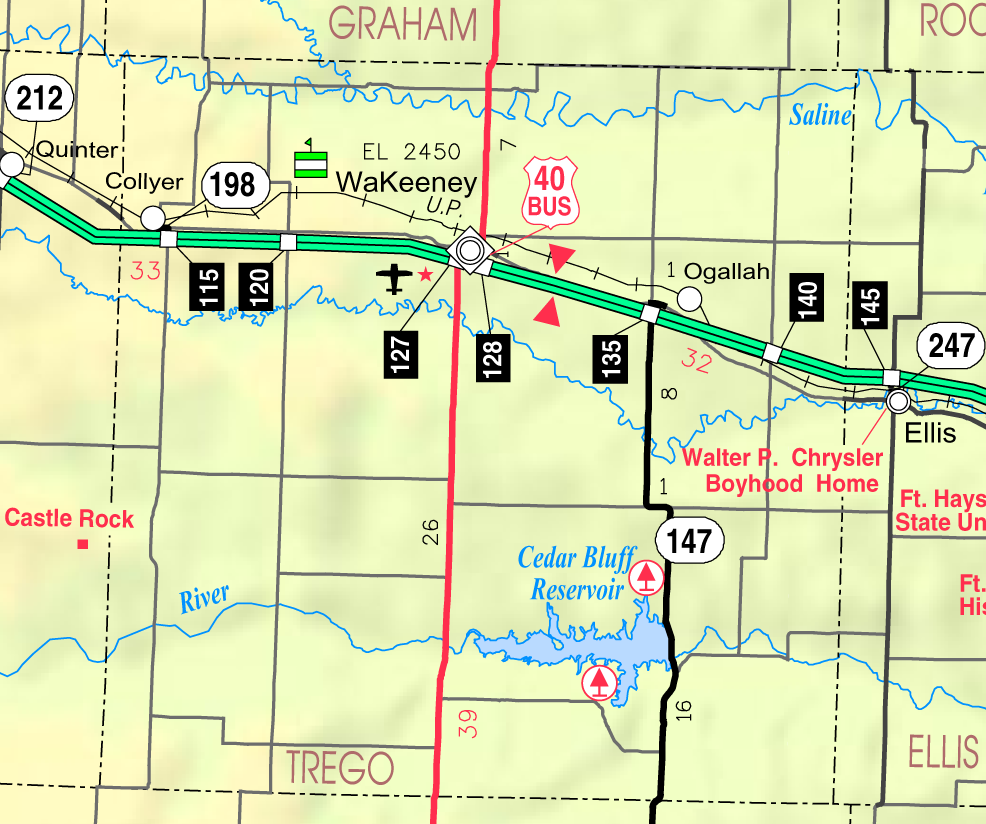
- KDOT map of Trego County (legend)

- Location within Kansas Location within the United States
- Coordinates: 38°53′51″N 100°06′46″W
- Country: United States
- State: Kansas
- County: Trego
- Elevation: 2,408 ft (734 m)

Population
  - Total: 0
- Time zone: UTC-6 (CST)
  - Summer (DST): UTC-5 (CDT)
- Area code: 785
- GNIS ID: 482667

Banner is a ghost town in Collyer Township of Trego County, Kansas, United States.

== History ==
Banner was issued a post office in 1879. The post office was discontinued in 1918.
