= North Fork Smoky Hill River =

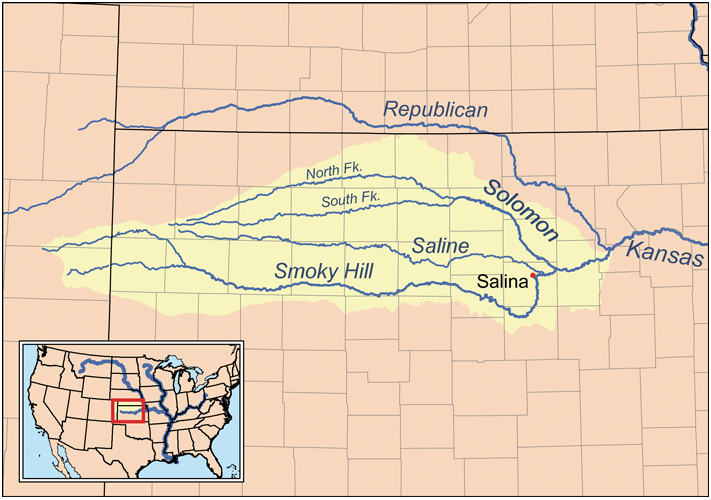
- Map of the Smoky Hill drainage basin

Location
- Country: United States
- State: Colorado, Kansas

Physical characteristics
- Source
  - location: Cheyenne County, Colorado
  - coordinates: 39°02′06″N 102°48′28″W
  - elevation: 4,811 ft (1,466 m)
- Mouth: Smoky Hill River
  - location: Logan County, Kansas
  - coordinates: 38°55′13″N 101°16′51″W
  - elevation: 2,940 ft (900 m)
- Length: 195 mi (314 km)
- Basin size: 759 sq mi (1,970 km^{2})

Basin features
- Watersheds: North Fork Smoky Hill-Smoky Hill-Kansas-Missouri-Mississippi

The North Fork Smoky Hill River is a river in the central Great Plains of North America. A tributary of the Smoky Hill River, it flows from eastern Colorado into western Kansas.

== Geography ==
The North Fork Smoky Hill River rises in the High Plains region of the Great Plains. Its source lies in extreme northern Cheyenne County, Colorado 29 miles (47 km) west-northwest of Cheyenne Wells, the county seat. From there, the river flows east then east-northeast into Kansas. In south-central Sherman County, it has been dammed to form a small reservoir, Sherman State Fishing Lake. A few miles east of the reservoir, the river turns southeast and continues to its confluence with the Smoky Hill River in central Logan County 5 miles (8.0 km) west of Russell Springs.

The river has a total length of 195 miles (314 km) and drains an area of 759 square miles (1,970 km^{2}).

== Hydrology ==
The river is intermittent with water flowing only during and after rains.

== See also ==
- List of rivers of Colorado
- List of rivers of Kansas
