= WaKeeney, Kansas =

City in Trego County, Kansas, United States

- City and County seat
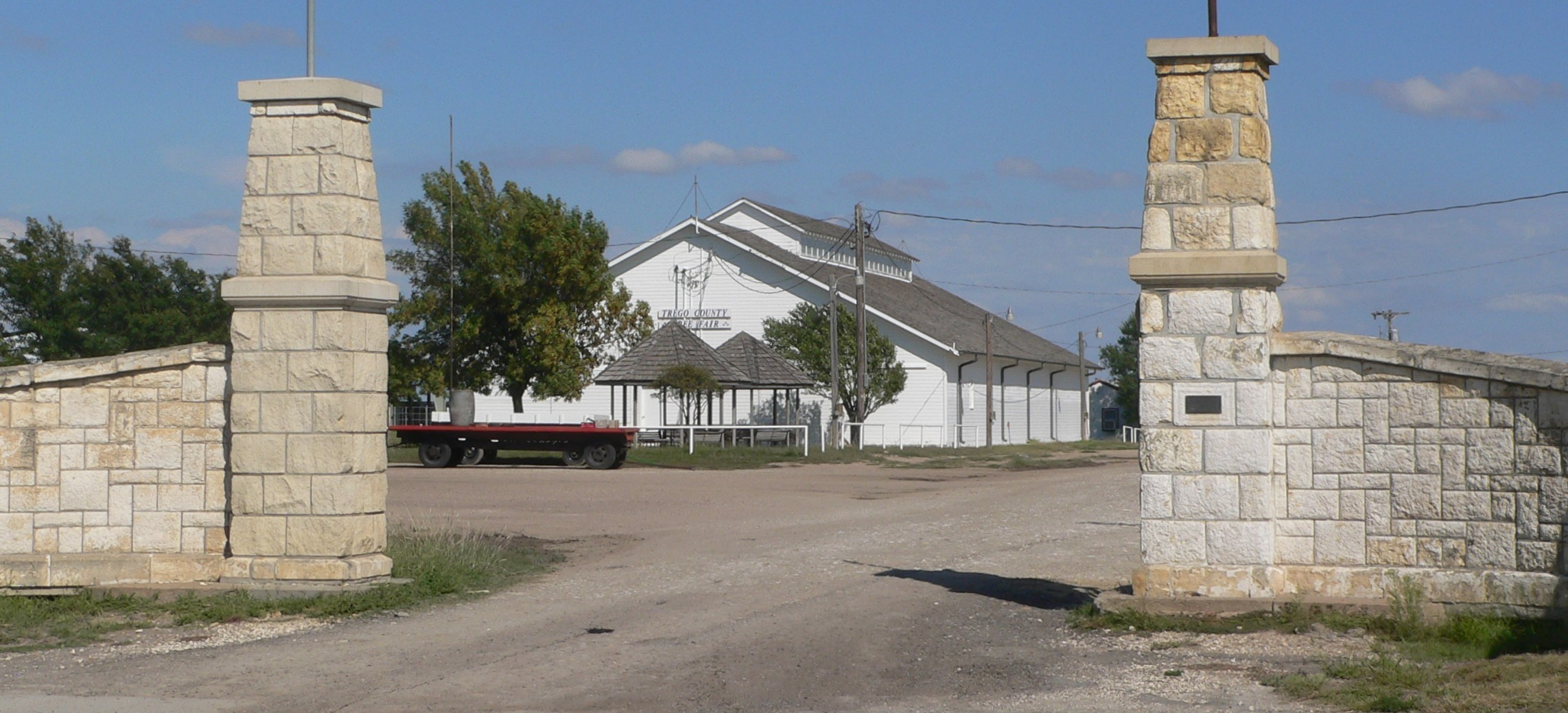
- Trego County fairgrounds exhibit building (2014)

- Location within Trego County and Kansas

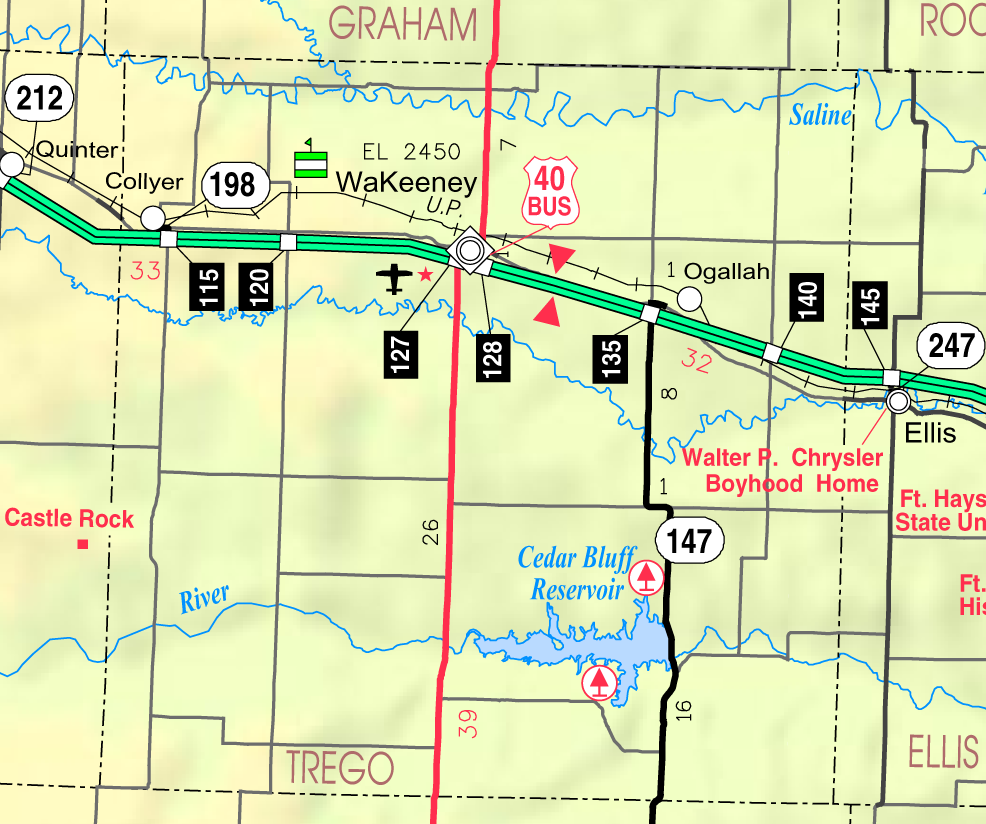
- KDOT map of Trego County (legend)
- Coordinates: 39°1′30″N 99°52′46″W
- Country: United States
- State: Kansas
- County: Trego
- Founded: 1879
- Incorporated: 1880

Area
  - Total: 1.78 sq mi (4.61 km^{2})
  - Land: 1.78 sq mi (4.61 km^{2})
  - Water: 0 sq mi (0.00 km^{2})
- Elevation: 2,448 ft (746 m)

Population (2020)
  - Total: 1,799
  - Density: 1,010/sq mi (390/km^{2})
- Time zone: UTC-6 (CST)
  - Summer (DST): UTC-5 (CDT)
- ZIP Code: 67672
- Area code: 785
- FIPS code: 20-74450
- GNIS ID: 472517
- Website: City website

WaKeeney is a city in and the county seat of Trego County, Kansas, United States. As of the 2020 census, the population of the city was 1,799. The city was established in 1879 and named as a portmanteau of the surnames of its founders, Albert Warren and James Keeney.

== History ==
James Keeney, a land speculator in Chicago, purchased land at the site of modern-day WaKeeney from the Kansas Pacific Railway in 1877. He and business partner Albert Warren formed Warren, Keeney, & Co., surveyed and plotted the site in 1878, and established a colony there in 1879. They named the colony WaKeeney, a portmanteau of their surnames, and billed it as "The Queen City of the High Plains", advertising and holding celebrations to attract settlers. The colony grew rapidly, but crop failures drove settlers to leave in 1880 as quickly as they had come. By 1882, all that was left were "five poorly patronized retail stores". Years later, Volga Germans began settling the area.

WaKeeney became the county seat in June 1879 and was incorporated as a city in 1880.

== Geography ==
WaKeeney is located at 39°01′28″N 99°52′55″W (39.024467, -99.881972) at an elevation of 2,447 feet (746 m). Located in northwestern Kansas at the intersection of Interstate 70 and U.S. Route 283, it is 162 miles (261 km) northwest of Wichita, 281 miles (452 km) east-southeast of Denver, and 284 miles (457 km) west of Kansas City.

WaKeeney lies in the High Plains region of the Great Plains approximately 2 miles (3.2 km) north of Big Creek, a tributary of the Smoky Hill River. A small tributary of Big Creek flows south from near the center of the city.

According to the United States Census Bureau, the city has a total area of 1.71 square miles (4.43 km^{2}), all land.

=== Climate ===
WaKeeney has a humid continental climate (Köppen Dfa), experiencing hot, humid summers and cold, dry winters. On average, January is the coolest month, and July is both the warmest month and the wettest month. The hottest temperature recorded in was 115 °F (46.1 °C) on July 24, 1936, while the coldest temperature recorded was −25 °F (−31.7 °C) on January 12, 1912 and December 22, 1989.

Climate data for WaKeeney, Kansas, 1991–2020 normals, extremes 1893–present
Month	Jan	Feb	Mar	Apr	May	Jun	Jul	Aug	Sep	Oct	Nov	Dec	Year
Record high °F (°C)	83 (28)	87 (31)	95 (35)	102 (39)	103 (39)	114 (46)	115 (46)	112 (44)	109 (43)	99 (37)	89 (32)	81 (27)	115 (46)
Mean maximum °F (°C)	66.7 (19.3)	72.8 (22.7)	82.0 (27.8)	88.7 (31.5)	94.4 (34.7)	102.1 (38.9)	104.7 (40.4)	102.4 (39.1)	98.2 (36.8)	91.2 (32.9)	78.1 (25.6)	65.4 (18.6)	105.6 (40.9)
Mean daily maximum °F (°C)	42.3 (5.7)	46.2 (7.9)	57.1 (13.9)	66.2 (19.0)	75.9 (24.4)	87.5 (30.8)	92.9 (33.8)	90.3 (32.4)	82.4 (28.0)	69.2 (20.7)	55.1 (12.8)	43.6 (6.4)	67.4 (19.7)
Daily mean °F (°C)	29.8 (−1.2)	33.1 (0.6)	42.9 (6.1)	52.0 (11.1)	62.7 (17.1)	74.0 (23.3)	79.2 (26.2)	76.7 (24.8)	68.2 (20.1)	54.8 (12.7)	41.8 (5.4)	31.6 (−0.2)	53.9 (12.2)
Mean daily minimum °F (°C)	17.4 (−8.1)	20.0 (−6.7)	28.7 (−1.8)	37.9 (3.3)	49.4 (9.7)	60.4 (15.8)	65.5 (18.6)	63.2 (17.3)	54.1 (12.3)	40.5 (4.7)	28.4 (−2.0)	19.6 (−6.9)	40.4 (4.7)
Mean minimum °F (°C)	1.1 (−17.2)	4.3 (−15.4)	12.4 (−10.9)	23.9 (−4.5)	35.8 (2.1)	49.8 (9.9)	56.7 (13.7)	54.8 (12.7)	40.9 (4.9)	25.0 (−3.9)	13.2 (−10.4)	3.7 (−15.7)	−4.0 (−20.0)
Record low °F (°C)	−25 (−32)	−19 (−28)	−15 (−26)	6 (−14)	20 (−7)	37 (3)	43 (6)	40 (4)	24 (−4)	10 (−12)	−4 (−20)	−25 (−32)	−25 (−32)
Average precipitation inches (mm)	0.57 (14)	0.85 (22)	1.32 (34)	2.04 (52)	3.98 (101)	3.09 (78)	3.80 (97)	3.04 (77)	1.83 (46)	1.64 (42)	0.88 (22)	0.88 (22)	23.92 (607)
Average snowfall inches (cm)	4.3 (11)	4.3 (11)	3.2 (8.1)	1.3 (3.3)	0.0 (0.0)	0.0 (0.0)	0.0 (0.0)	0.0 (0.0)	0.0 (0.0)	1.1 (2.8)	1.8 (4.6)	4.3 (11)	20.3 (51.8)
Average precipitation days (≥ 0.01 in)	3.7	4.5	5.2	7.0	9.5	7.9	7.9	7.6	5.6	5.4	4.2	3.5	72.0
Average snowy days (≥ 0.1 in)	2.8	3.3	1.6	0.8	0.0	0.0	0.0	0.0	0.0	0.2	1.1	2.8	12.6
Source 1: NOAA
Source 2: National Weather Service

== Demographics ==
Historical population
Census	Pop.	Note	%±
1880	418		—
1890	439		5.0%
1900	394		−10.3%
1910	883		124.1%
1920	1,003		13.6%
1930	1,408		40.4%
1940	1,852		31.5%
1950	2,446		32.1%
1960	2,808		14.8%
1970	2,334		−16.9%
1980	2,388		2.3%
1990	2,161		−9.5%
2000	1,924		−11.0%
2010	1,862		−3.2%
2020	1,799		−3.4%
U.S. Decennial Census

=== 2020 census ===
As of the 2020 census, WaKeeney had a population of 1,799 people, with 837 households and 482 families. The population density was 1,009.0 inhabitants per square mile (389.6/km^{2}). There were 1,004 housing units at an average density of 563.1 per square mile (217.4/km^{2}).

0.0% of residents lived in urban areas, while 100.0% lived in rural areas.

Of the 837 households, 22.2% had children under the age of 18 living in them. Of all households, 44.8% were married-couple households, 19.5% were households with a male householder and no spouse or partner present, and 29.6% were households with a female householder and no spouse or partner present. About 38.2% of all households were made up of individuals, and 19.9% had someone living alone who was 65 years of age or older.

Of the housing units, 16.6% were vacant. The homeowner vacancy rate was 2.8% and the rental vacancy rate was 22.4%.

The median age was 47.4 years. 21.5% of residents were under the age of 18, 5.1% were from 18 to 24, 21.0% were from 25 to 44, 27.9% were from 45 to 64, and 24.5% were 65 years of age or older. For every 100 females there were 95.1 males, and for every 100 females age 18 and over there were 89.0 males age 18 and over.

Racial composition as of the 2020 census
Race	Number	Percent
White	1,683	93.6%
Black or African American	3	0.2%
American Indian and Alaska Native	2	0.1%
Asian	10	0.6%
Native Hawaiian and Other Pacific Islander	0	0.0%
Some other race	7	0.4%
Two or more races	94	5.2%
Hispanic or Latino (of any race)	45	2.5%

Demographic estimates

The 2016–2020 5-year American Community Survey estimates show that the average household size was 2.0 and the average family size was 2.4. The percent of those with a bachelor's degree or higher was estimated to be 15.9% of the population.

Income and poverty

The 2016–2020 5-year American Community Survey estimates show that the median household income was $54,805 (with a margin of error of +/- $7,551) and the median family income was $78,125 (+/- $17,778). Males had a median income of $44,231 (+/- $9,782) versus $27,482 (+/- $4,438) for females. The median income for those above 16 years old was $32,172 (+/- $5,427). Approximately, 7.5% of families and 6.3% of the population were below the poverty line, including 10.8% of those under the age of 18 and 0.5% of those ages 65 or over.

=== 2010 census ===
As of the census of 2010, there were 1,862 people, 864 households, and 500 families residing in the city. The population density was 1,088.9 inhabitants per square mile (420.4/km^{2}). There were 988 housing units at an average density of 577.8 per square mile (223.1/km^{2}). The racial makeup of the city was 96.9% White, 0.5% African American, 0.3% Native American, 0.3% Asian, 0.1% Pacific Islander, 0.9% from other races, and 1.0% from two or more races. Hispanic or Latino of any race were 1.6% of the population.

There were 864 households, of which 23.0% had children under the age of 18 living with them, 47.6% were married couples living together, 7.3% had a female householder with no husband present, 3.0% had a male householder with no wife present, and 42.1% were non-families. 36.8% of all households were made up of individuals, and 19.9% had someone living alone who was 65 years of age or older. The average household size was 2.09 and the average family size was 2.73.

The median age in the city was 48.8 years. 20% of residents were under the age of 18; 5.6% were between the ages of 18 and 24; 18.9% were from 25 to 44; 30.3% were from 45 to 64; and 25.3% were 65 years of age or older. The gender makeup of the city was 48.5% male and 51.5% female.

== Education ==
The community is served by WaKeeney USD 208 public school district, which primary and secondary education with two schools in WaKeeney: Trego Grade School (Grades Pre-K-8) and Trego Community High School (9-12).

The Trego Golden Eagles won the Kansas State High School boys class 2A Track & Field championship in 1977 and the boys class 3A Track & Field championship in 1997.

== Infrastructure ==
=== Transportation ===
Interstate 70 and U.S. Route 40 run concurrently southeast-northwest immediately south of WaKeeney, intersecting U.S. Route 283 which runs north–south through the city. U.S. 283 runs east–west for one mile in downtown WaKeeney, concurrent with U.S. Route 40 Business and the old alignment of U.S. 40.

Trego WaKeeney Airport is located on the west side of U.S. 283, immediately south of I-70. Publicly owned, it has one concrete runway and is used for general aviation.

Union Pacific Railroad operates one freight rail line, the Kansas Pacific (KP) line, through WaKeeney. It runs east–west through the city.

== Media ==
The local newspaper published in WaKeeney is the weekly Western Kansas World.

K231BG, a translator of radio station KJIL in Copeland, Kansas, broadcasts from WaKeeney on 94.1 FM playing a Contemporary Christian format.

WaKeeney is in the Wichita-Hutchinson, Kansas television market.

== Culture ==
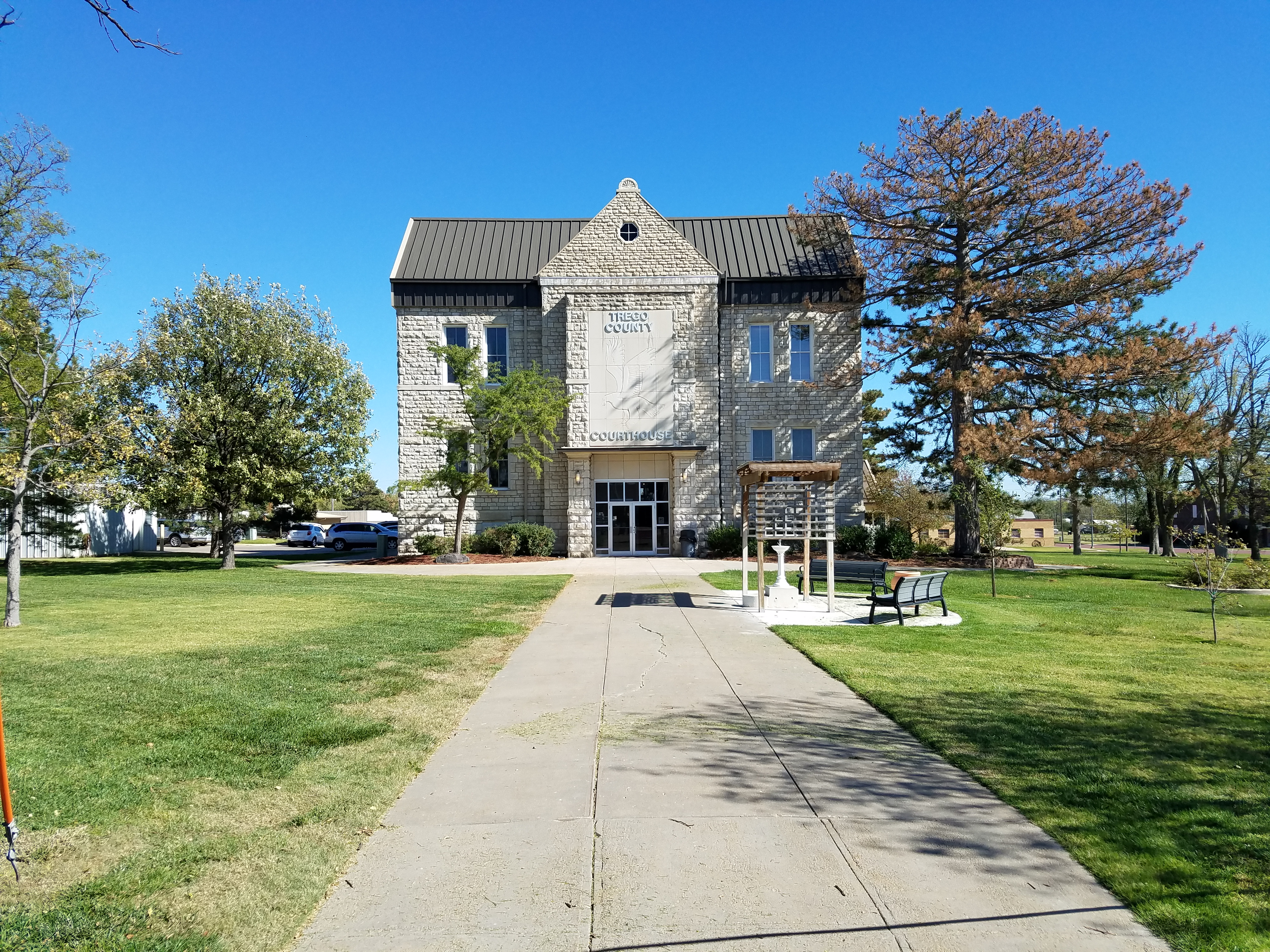
West side of Trego County Courthouse (2017)

=== Events ===
Since 1950, WaKeeney has hosted an ornate civic Christmas lighting display, which now includes over 6,000 lights and a 35-foot man-made Christmas tree in the center of town. The tree is ceremonially lit the Saturday night after Thanksgiving through New Years Day.

=== Points of interest ===
The train depot, built in 1879 with Saline River and Big Creek limestone, was the first major building in the town. It was inaugurated on July 4 of that year, with officials from Warren, Keeney and the Kansas governor in attendance. Union Pacific later acquired the depot and used it until the 1930s. The Opera House was the next major building, completed in 1884 with ceiling murals, a Rochester electric brass chandelier, and seating for 400. It was destroyed by fire the following year.

The Trego County Courthouse, constructed of Trego County hard stone and Manhattan stone, was designed by Topeka architect George R. Ropes in the Queen Anne style, with a 100-ft cupola and European tin roof which lasted until 1952. The courthouse is still in use, although the basement jail, with unusual flat bars, was closed in 1976. The building appeared in several scenes in the 1974 film Paper Moon.

== Notable people ==
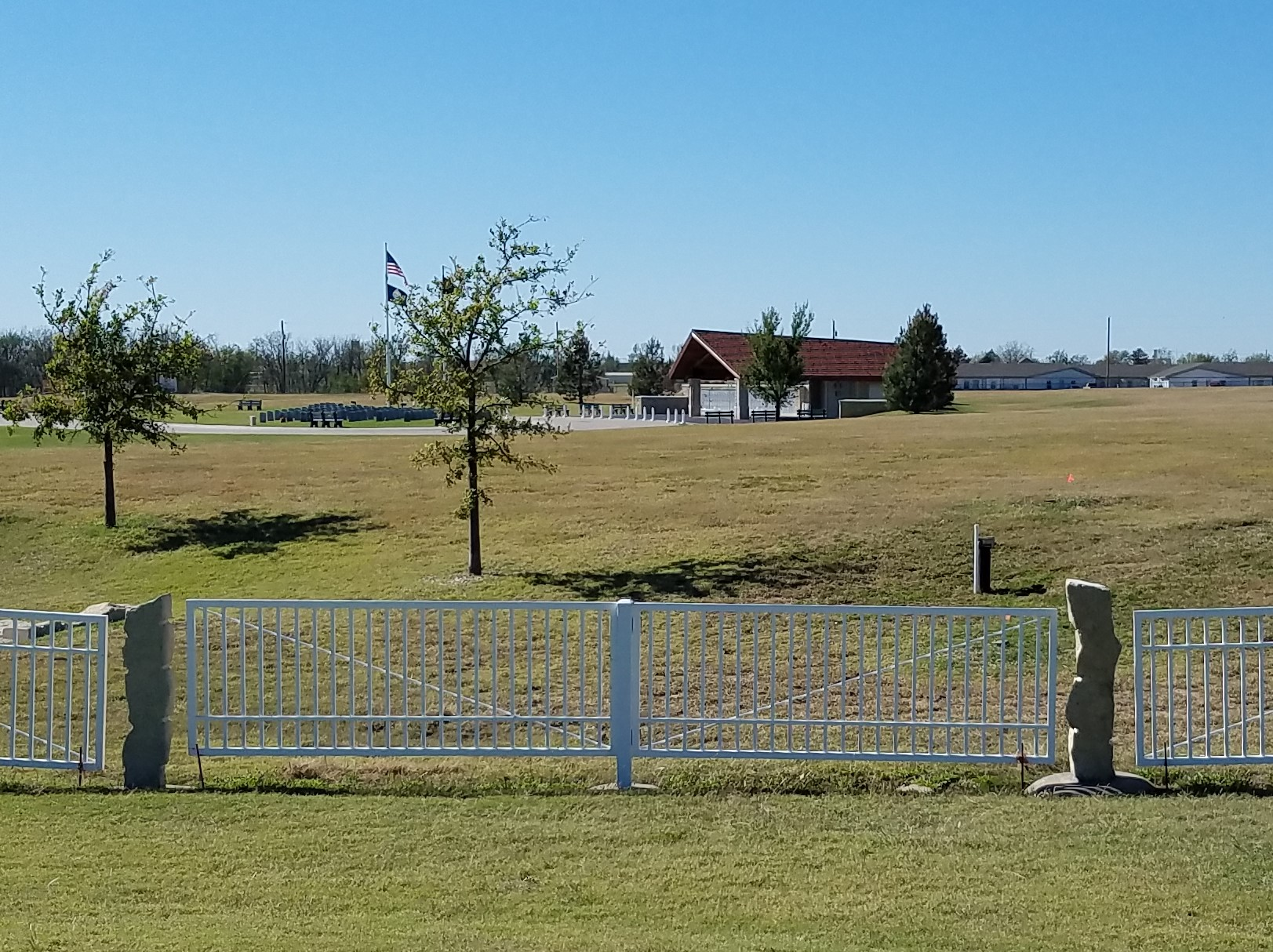
Kansas Veterans' Cemetery (2017)

Notable individuals who were born in and/or have lived in WaKeeney include:

- Charles Garrigues (1903-1974), journalist
- Steve Gotsche (1961- ), PGA Tour and Nationwide Tour golfer
- Andrew Harlan (1815-1907), U.S. Representative from Indiana
- Frank Mechau (1904-1946), painter
- Mike Schreiner (1969- ), Leader of Ontario Green Party; Member of the Ontario Legislative Assembly
- Orrin Upshaw (1874-1937), U.S. Olympic tug of war athlete
