= Trego County, Kansas =

County in Kansas, United States

- County
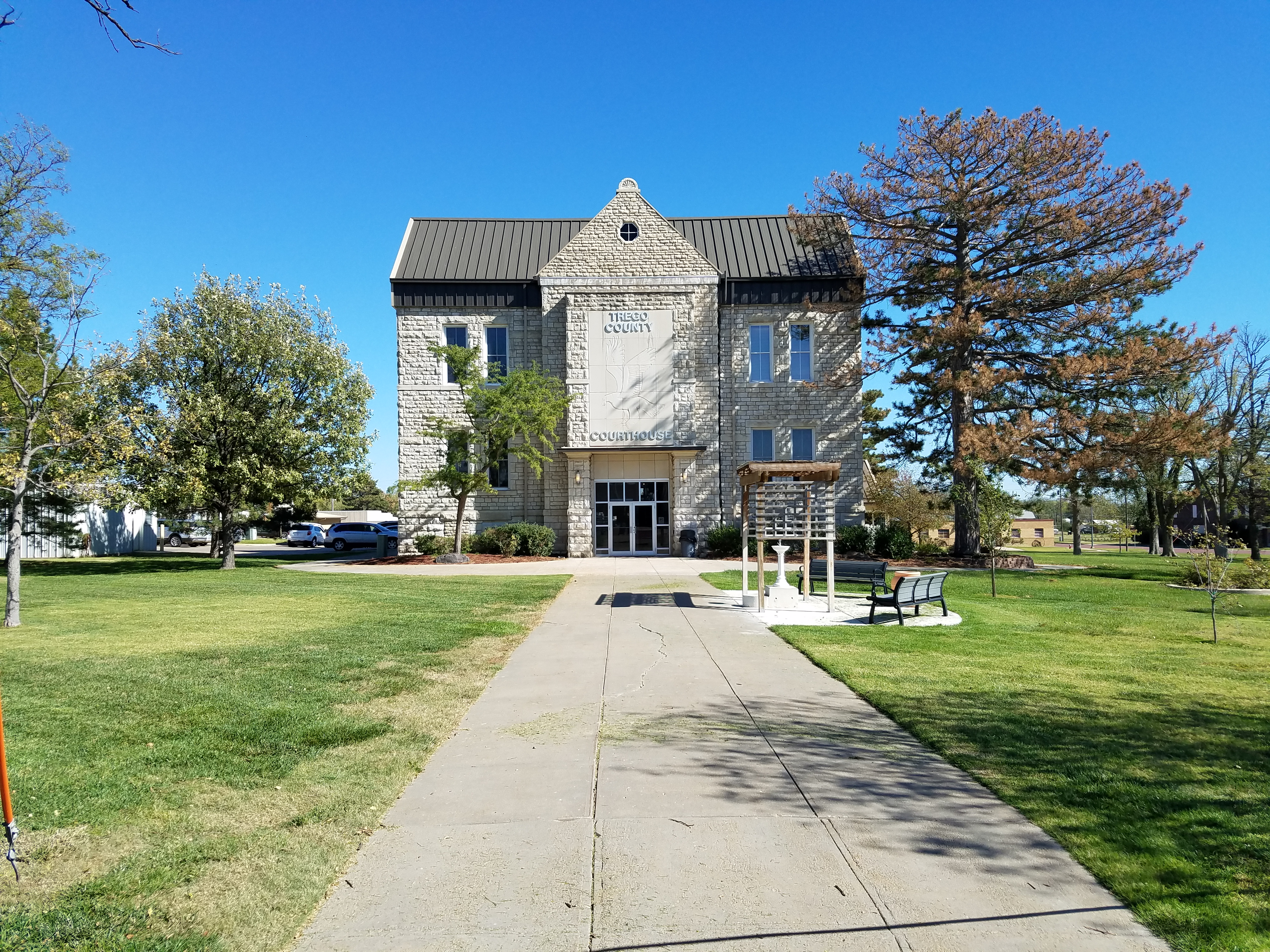
- Trego County Courthouse in WaKeeney (2017)

- Location within the U.S. state of Kansas
- Coordinates: 39°00′30″N 100°03′54″W
- Country: United States
- State: Kansas
- Founded: June 21, 1879
- Named for: Edgar Poe Trego
- Seat: WaKeeney
- Largest city: WaKeeney

Area
  - Total: 900 sq mi (2,300 km^{2})
  - Land: 889 sq mi (2,300 km^{2})
  - Water: 10 sq mi (26 km^{2}) 1.1%

Population (2020)
  - Total: 2,808
  - Estimate (2025): 2,740 ▼
  - Density: 3.2/sq mi (1.2/km^{2})
- Time zone: UTC−6 (Central)
  - Summer (DST): UTC−5 (CDT)
- Congressional district: 1st
- Website: tregocountyks.gov

Trego County is a county located in the U.S. state of Kansas. Its county seat and largest city is WaKeeney. As of the 2020 census, the county population was 2,808. The county was named for Edgar Trego.

== History ==
=== Early history ===
For many millennia, the Great Plains of North America was inhabited by nomadic Native Americans. From the 16th century to 18th century, the Kingdom of France claimed ownership of large parts of North America. In 1762, after the French and Indian War, France secretly ceded New France to Spain, per the Treaty of Fontainebleau.

=== 19th century ===
In 1802, Spain returned most of the land to France, but keeping title to about 7,500 square miles. In 1803, most of the land for modern day Kansas was acquired by the United States from France as part of the 828,000 square mile Louisiana Purchase for 2.83 cents per acre.

In 1854, the Kansas Territory was organized, then in 1861 Kansas became the 34th U.S. state. In 1879, Trego County was established.

== Geography ==
According to the U.S. Census Bureau, the county has a total area of 900 square miles (2,300 km^{2}), of which 889 square miles (2,300 km^{2}) is land and 10 square miles (26 km^{2}) (1.1%) is water.

=== Adjacent counties ===
- Graham County (north)
- Rooks County (northeast)
- Ellis County (east)
- Ness County (south)
- Gove County (west)

=== Major highways ===
- I-70 / US-40
- US-283
- K-147

== Demographics ==
Historical population
Census	Pop.	Note	%±
1870	166		—
1880	2,535		1,427.1%
1890	2,535		0.0%
1900	2,722		7.4%
1910	5,398		98.3%
1920	5,880		8.9%
1930	6,470		10.0%
1940	5,822		−10.0%
1950	5,868		0.8%
1960	5,473		−6.7%
1970	4,436		−18.9%
1980	4,165		−6.1%
1990	3,694		−11.3%
2000	3,319		−10.2%
2010	3,001		−9.6%
2020	2,808		−6.4%
2025 (est.)	2,740	▼	−2.4%
U.S. Decennial Census; 1790-1960 1900-1990; 1990-2000 2010-2020

=== Racial and ethnic composition ===
Trego County, Kansas – Racial and ethnic composition Note: the US Census treats Hispanic/Latino as an ethnic category. This table excludes Latinos from the racial categories and assigns them to a separate category. Hispanics/Latinos may be of any race.
Race / Ethnicity (NH = Non-Hispanic)	Pop 1980	Pop 1990	Pop 2000	Pop 2010	Pop 2020	% 1980	% 1990	% 2000	% 2010	% 2020
White alone (NH)	4,125	3,660	3,230	2,902	2,627	99.04%	99.08%	97.32%	96.70%	93.55%
Black or African American alone (NH)	4	2	6	13	4	0.10%	0.05%	0.18%	0.43%	0.14%
Native American or Alaska Native alone (NH)	6	6	12	6	4	0.14%	0.16%	0.36%	0.20%	0.14%
Asian alone (NH)	6	17	16	7	12	0.14%	0.46%	0.48%	0.23%	0.43%
Native Hawaiian or Pacific Islander alone (NH)	x	x	1	2	0	x	x	0.03%	0.07%	0.00%
Other race alone (NH)	2	0	0	3	2	0.05%	0.00%	0.00%	0.10%	0.07%
Mixed race or Multiracial (NH)	x	x	28	17	95	x	x	0.84%	0.57%	3.38%
Hispanic or Latino (any race)	22	9	26	51	64	0.53%	0.24%	0.78%	1.70%	2.28%
Total	4,165	3,694	3,319	3,001	2,808	100.00%	100.00%	100.00%	100.00%	100.00%

=== 2020 census ===
As of the 2020 census, the county had a population of 2,808. The median age was 48.8 years. 20.8% of residents were under the age of 18 and 25.9% of residents were 65 years of age or older. For every 100 females there were 100.1 males, and for every 100 females age 18 and over there were 98.8 males age 18 and over.

The racial makeup of the county was 94.2% White, 0.2% Black or African American, 0.2% American Indian and Alaska Native, 0.4% Asian, 0.0% Native Hawaiian and Pacific Islander, 0.3% from some other race, and 4.7% from two or more races. Hispanic or Latino residents of any race comprised 2.3% of the population.

0.0% of residents lived in urban areas, while 100.0% lived in rural areas.

There were 1,283 households in the county, of which 22.0% had children under the age of 18 living with them and 23.5% had a female householder with no spouse or partner present. About 33.4% of all households were made up of individuals and 16.8% had someone living alone who was 65 years of age or older.

There were 1,611 housing units, of which 20.4% were vacant. Among occupied housing units, 78.3% were owner-occupied and 21.7% were renter-occupied. The homeowner vacancy rate was 2.1% and the rental vacancy rate was 23.1%.

=== 2000 census ===
As of the census of 2000, there were 3,319 people, 1,412 households, and 936 families residing in the county. The population density was 4 people per square mile (1.5 people/km^{2}). There were 1,723 housing units at an average density of 2 per square mile (0.77/km^{2}). The racial makeup of the county was 97.77% White, 0.18% Black or African American, 0.39% Native American, 0.48% Asian, 0.06% Pacific Islander, 0.15% from other races, and 0.96% from two or more races. 0.78% of the population were Hispanic or Latino of any race.

There were 1,412 households, out of which 27.30% had children under the age of 18 living with them, 58.10% were married couples living together, 6.30% had a female householder with no husband present, and 33.70% were non-families. 31.40% of all households were made up of individuals, and 17.70% had someone living alone who was 65 years of age or older. The average household size was 2.27 and the average family size was 2.86.

In the county, the population was spread out, with 23.90% under the age of 18, 5.50% from 18 to 24, 23.50% from 25 to 44, 23.20% from 45 to 64, and 24.00% who were 65 years of age or older. The median age was 44 years. For every 100 females there were 91.10 males. For every 100 females age 18 and over, there were 87.60 males.

The median income for a household in the county was $29,677, and the median income for a family was $40,524. Males had a median income of $26,545 versus $16,927 for females. The per capita income for the county was $16,239. About 11.20% of families and 12.30% of the population were below the poverty line, including 14.10% of those under age 18 and 12.00% of those age 65 or over.

== Government ==
=== Presidential elections ===
Trego County is often carried by Republican candidates. The last time a Democratic candidate has carried this county was in 1964. The county has generally voted for Republican candidates by a larger margin with each succeeding election.

Presidential election results

United States presidential election results for Trego County, Kansas
Year	Republican		Democratic		Third party(ies)	
Year	No.	%	No.	%	No.	%
1888	477	63.86%	220	29.45%	50	6.69%
1892	309	50.49%	0	0.00%	303	49.51%
1896	256	42.74%	340	56.76%	3	0.50%
1900	360	48.39%	361	48.52%	23	3.09%
1904	526	60.81%	264	30.52%	75	8.67%
1908	617	54.75%	458	40.64%	52	4.61%
1912	160	14.34%	449	40.23%	507	45.43%
1916	867	42.07%	1,094	53.08%	100	4.85%
1920	1,299	75.04%	395	22.82%	37	2.14%
1924	1,121	58.14%	399	20.70%	408	21.16%
1928	1,359	57.73%	982	41.72%	13	0.55%
1932	918	33.76%	1,751	64.40%	50	1.84%
1936	1,012	36.00%	1,783	63.43%	16	0.57%
1940	1,571	57.59%	1,140	41.79%	17	0.62%
1944	1,459	61.98%	883	37.51%	12	0.51%
1948	1,237	51.82%	1,117	46.80%	33	1.38%
1952	1,915	75.60%	608	24.00%	10	0.39%
1956	1,668	69.41%	726	30.21%	9	0.37%
1960	1,426	61.76%	875	37.90%	8	0.35%
1964	974	45.05%	1,177	54.44%	11	0.51%
1968	1,211	58.67%	623	30.18%	230	11.14%
1972	1,369	66.91%	621	30.35%	56	2.74%
1976	1,025	49.56%	1,003	48.50%	40	1.93%
1980	1,340	65.43%	523	25.54%	185	9.03%
1984	1,491	70.40%	598	28.23%	29	1.37%
1988	979	53.47%	795	43.42%	57	3.11%
1992	727	38.02%	608	31.80%	577	30.18%
1996	1,205	61.11%	548	27.79%	219	11.11%
2000	1,220	66.41%	516	28.09%	101	5.50%
2004	1,225	72.66%	434	25.74%	27	1.60%
2008	1,225	73.31%	420	25.13%	26	1.56%
2012	1,261	79.86%	291	18.43%	27	1.71%
2016	1,227	82.79%	198	13.36%	57	3.85%
2020	1,363	83.62%	242	14.85%	25	1.53%
2024	1,343	84.63%	216	13.61%	28	1.76%

=== Laws ===
Trego County was a prohibition, or "dry", county until the Kansas Constitution was amended in 1986 and voters approved the sale of alcoholic liquor by the individual drink with a 30 percent food sales requirement.

== Education ==
=== Unified school districts ===
- WaKeeney USD 208

== Communities ==
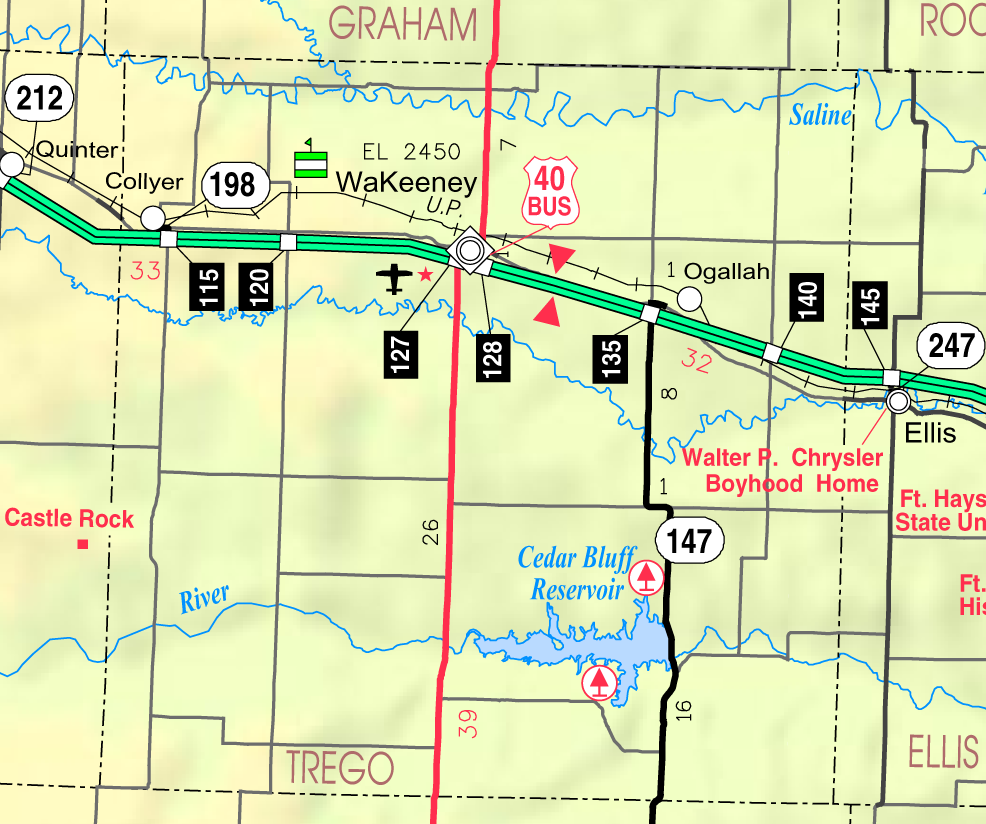
2005 map of Trego County (map legend)

List of townships / incorporated cities / unincorporated communities / extinct former communities within Trego County.
† means a community is designated a Census-Designated Place (CDP) by the United States Census Bureau.

=== Cities ===
- Collyer
- WaKeeney (county seat)

=== Unincorporated communities ===
- Ogallah†
- Riga
- Voda

=== Ghost towns ===
- Banner
- Bosna
- Cyrus
- Wilcox

=== Townships ===
Trego County is divided into three townships. None of the cities within the county are considered governmentally independent, and all figures for the townships include those of the cities. In the following table, the population center is the largest city (or cities) included in that township's population total, if it is of a significant size.

Sources: 2020 Census from the U.S. Census Bureau.
Township	FIPS	Population center	Population	Population density /km^{2} (/sq mi)	Land area km^{2} (sq mi)	Water area km^{2} (sq mi)	Water %	Geographic coordinates
Collyer	14925	Collyer	319	0 (1)	776 (300)	0 (0)	0.01%	39°0′31″N 100°3′55″W
Ogallah	52250	Ogallah	329	0 (1)	764 (295)	14 (6)	1.86%	39°0′31″N 99°41′49″W
WaKeeney	74475	WaKeeney	2,160	3 (7)	764 (295)	12 (5)	1.52%	39°0′41″N 99°52′36″W

== Gallery ==
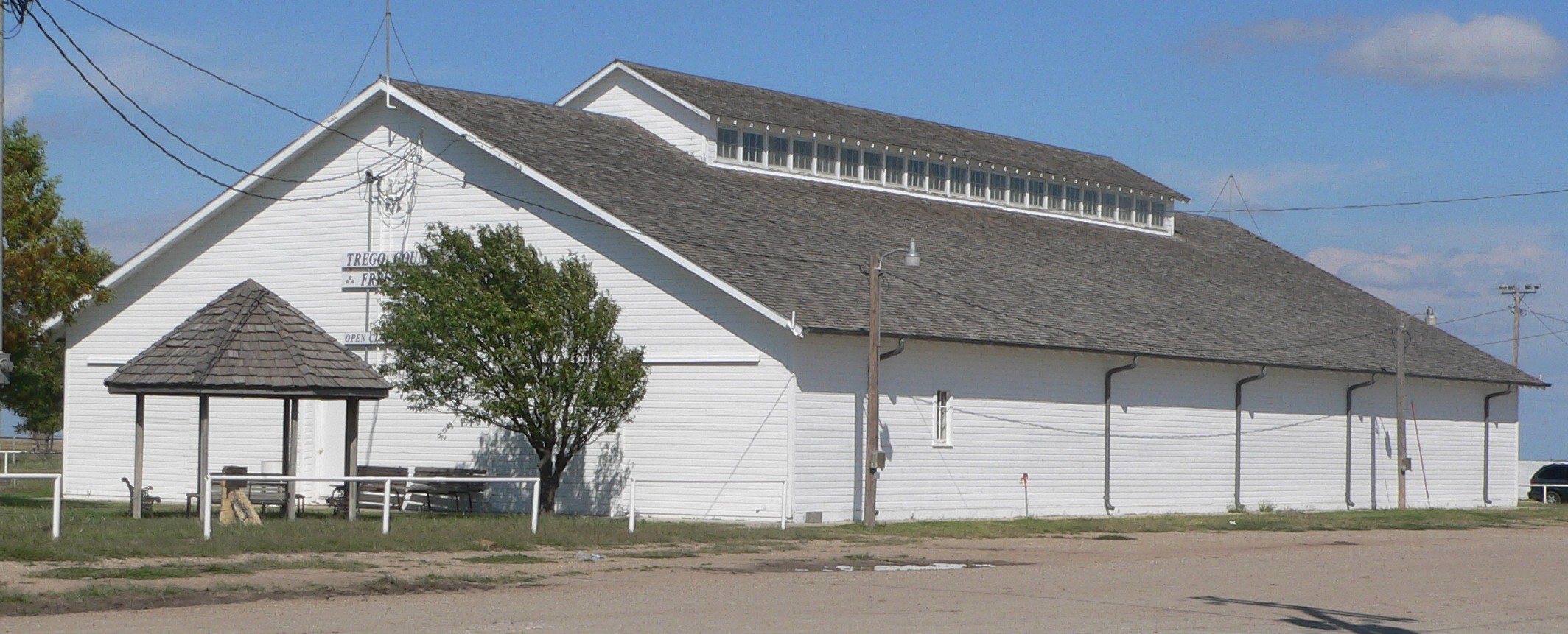
Trego County Fairgrounds Exhibit Building in WaKeeney

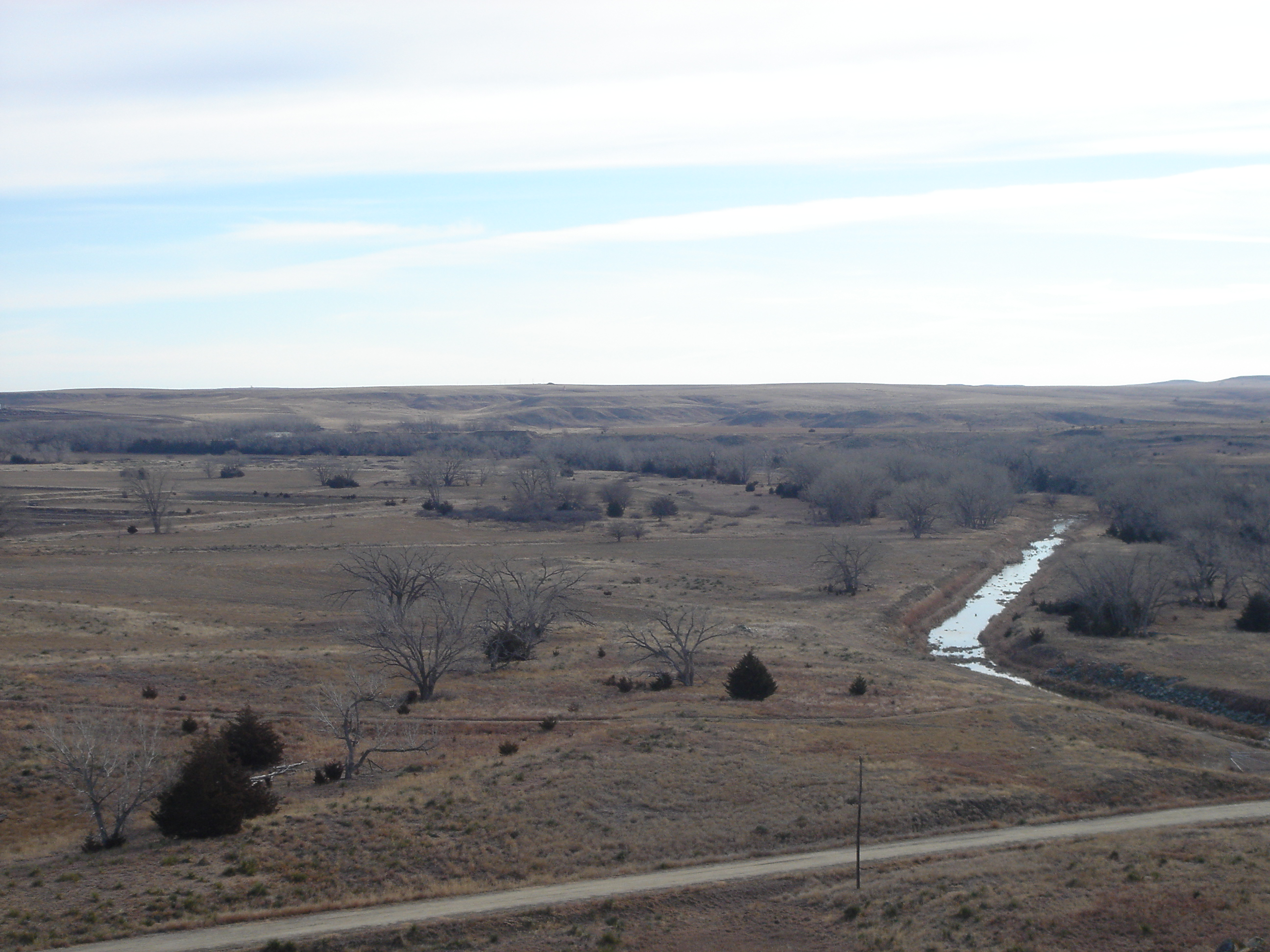
Smoky Hill River valley east of Cedar Bluff Reservoir dam.

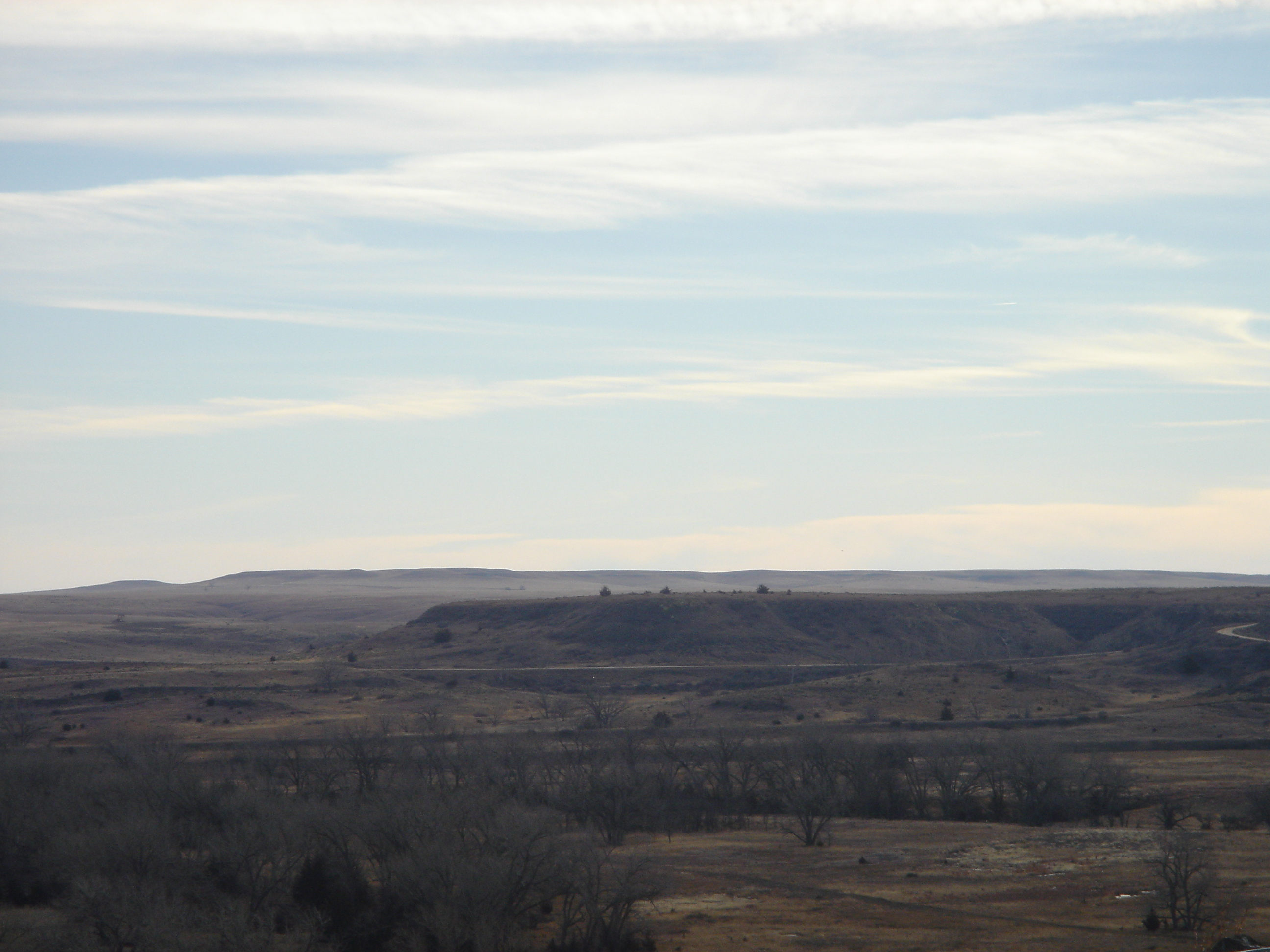
Fort Hays escarpment southeast of Cedar Bluff Reservoir dam.

== See also ==
Community information for Kansas

- Kansas locations by per capita income
- List of counties in Kansas
- List of townships in Kansas
- List of cities in Kansas
- List of unincorporated communities in Kansas
- List of ghost towns in Kansas
