= Cedar Bluff State Park =

State park in Kansas, United States

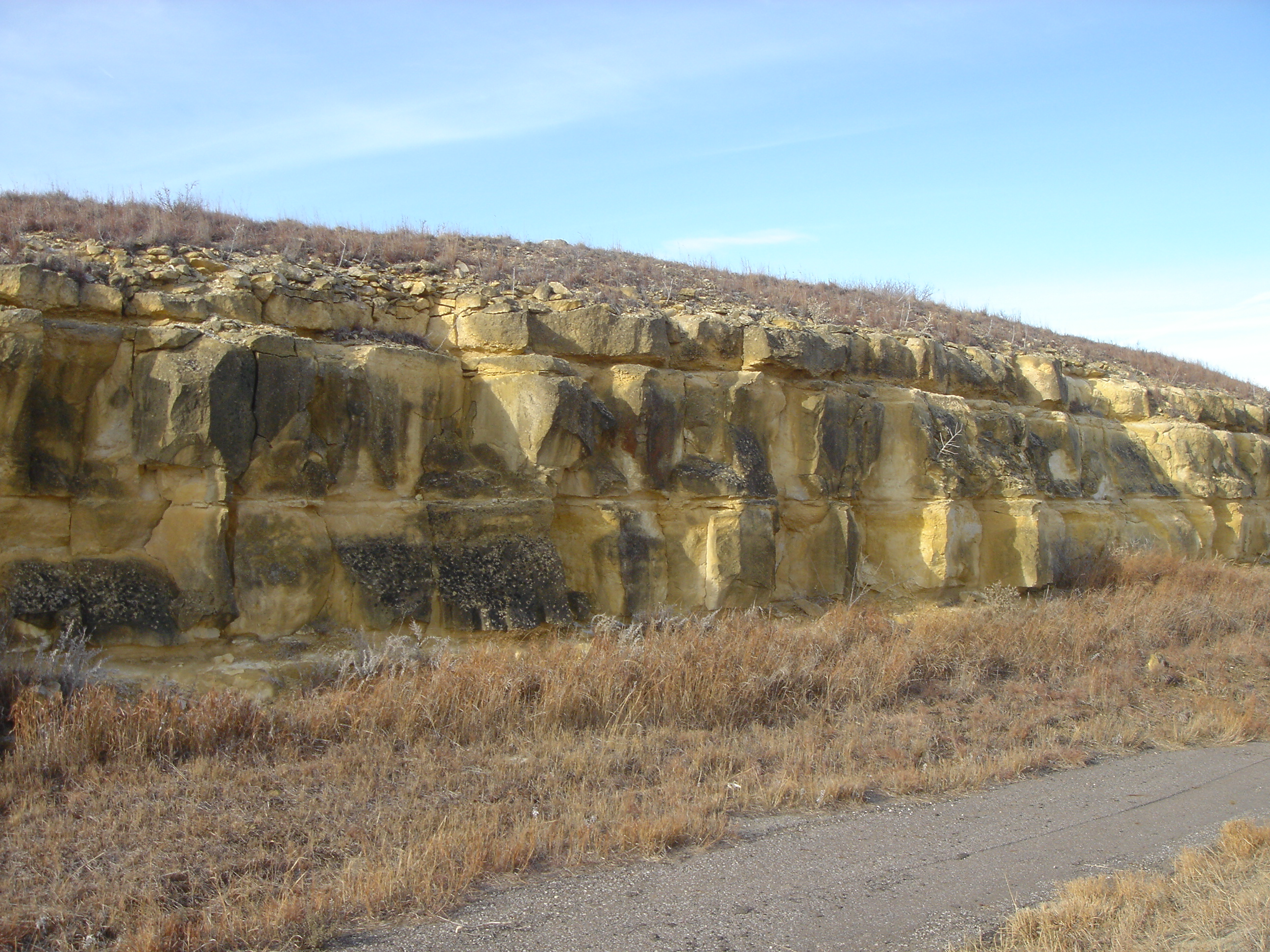
- Limestone on the edge of Cedar Bluff

- Location within Kansas Location within the United States
- Interactive map of Cedar Bluff State Park
- Location: Trego County, Kansas, United States
- Coordinates: 38°48′41″N 99°43′57″W
- Area: 850 acres (340 ha)
- Elevation: 2,123 ft (647 m)
- Established: 1962
- Administrator: Kansas Department of Wildlife and Parks
- Visitors: 182,252 (in 2022)
- Website: Official website
- Kansas State Parks

Cedar Bluff State Park is a public recreation area located 21 miles (34 km) southeast of WaKeeney and 23 miles (37 km) southwest of Ellis in Trego County, Kansas, United States.

The state park is divided into two areas, comprising 850 acres (340 ha), straddling the 6,800-acre (2,800 ha) Cedar Bluff Reservoir. The Bluffton Area—300 acres (120 ha) on the north shore—is the most developed and receives extensive use. The Page Creek Area—500 acres (200 ha) on the south shore—offers primitive camping as well as 36 utility sites. West of the Page Creek Area are the juniper-lined, 100-foot-tall (30 m) limestone bluffs from which the reservoir's name was derived (junipers were often misidentified as "cedars" by early settlers).

Threshing Machine Canyon, the site of an 1850s Native American attack on a wagon train bearing a threshing machine, is accessed by a road west of the park. In the historic canyon one can find carvings dating back to the mid-19th century.

== Gallery ==
Views of Cedar Bluff Reservoir

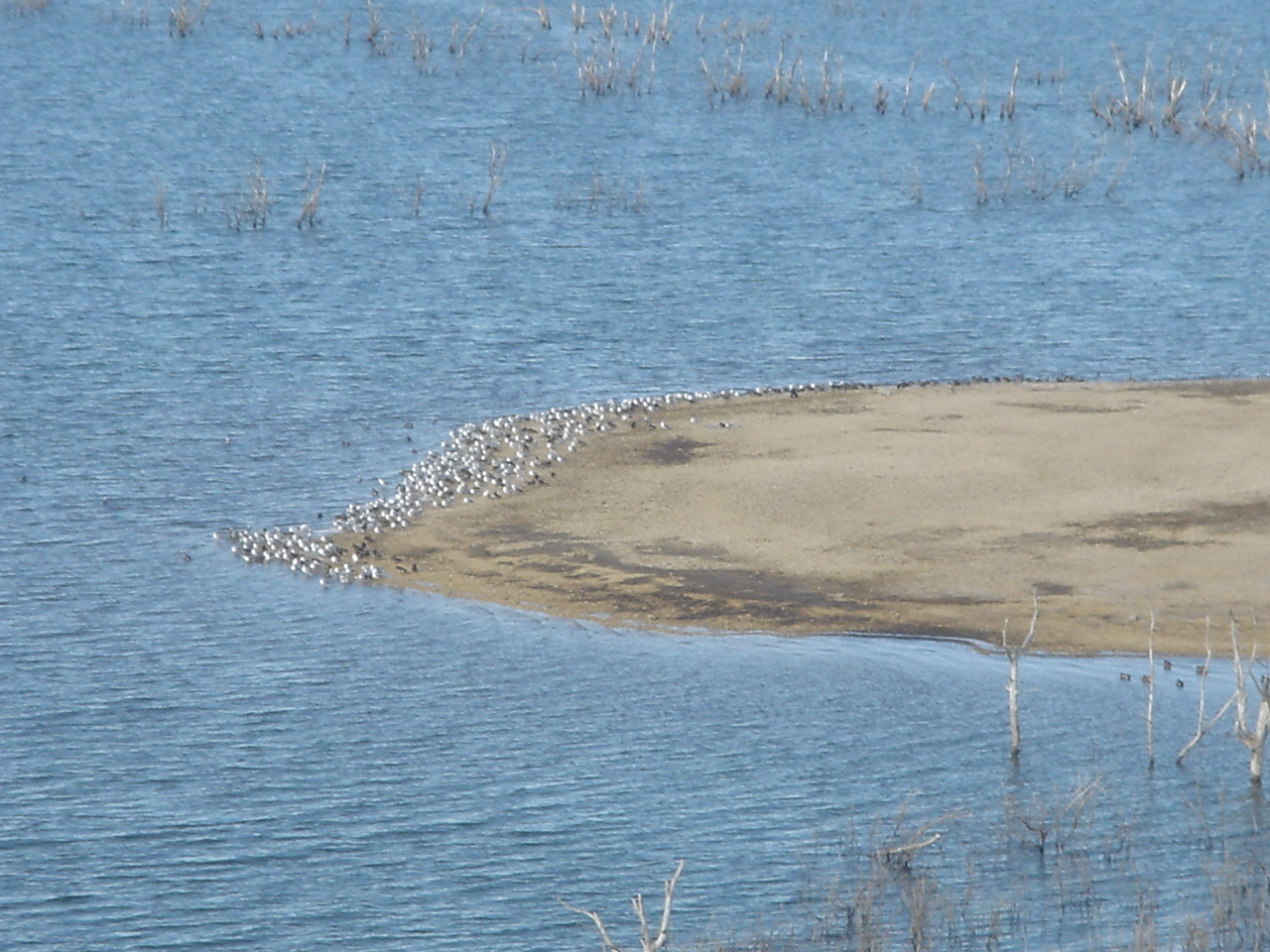

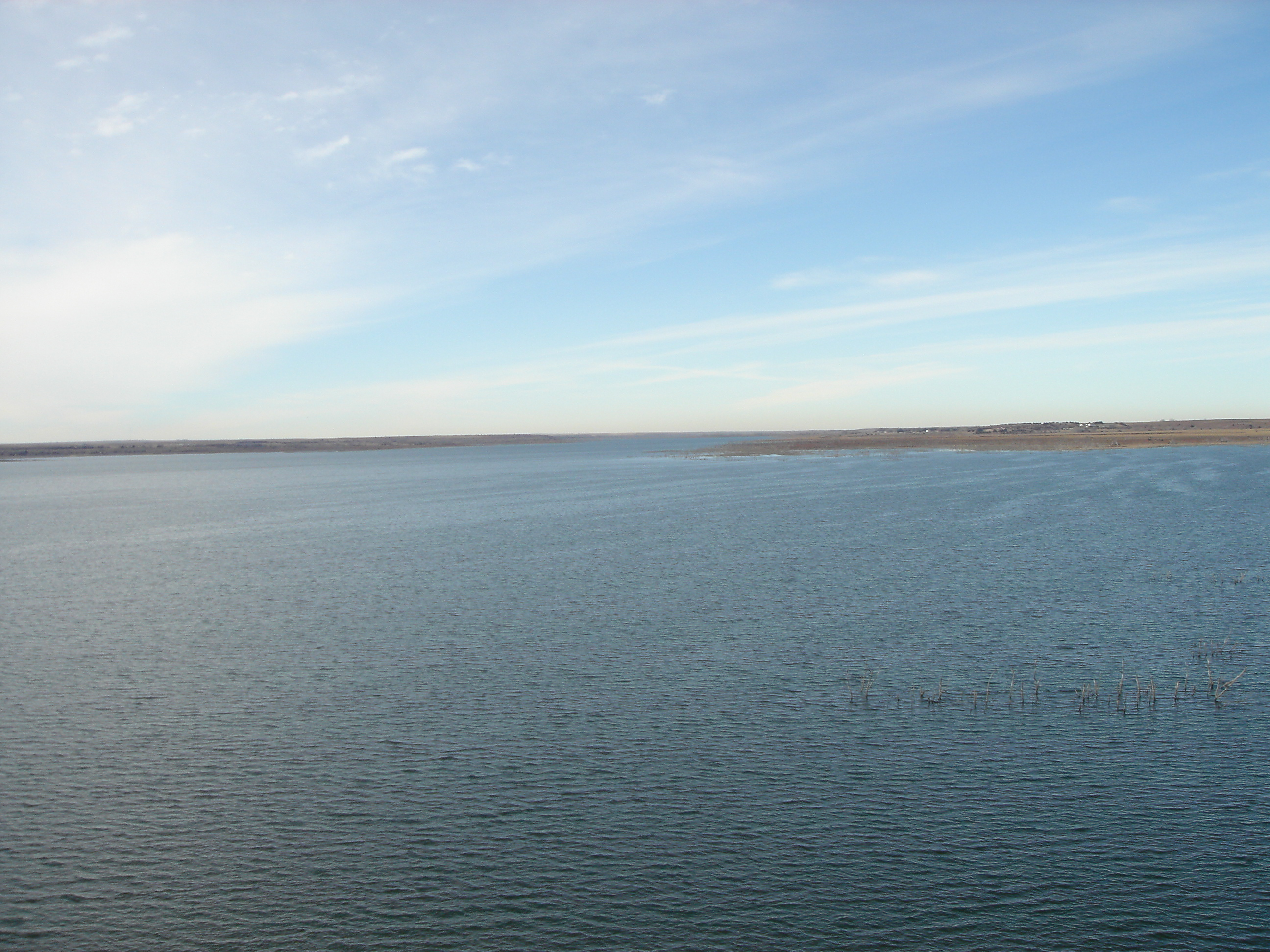

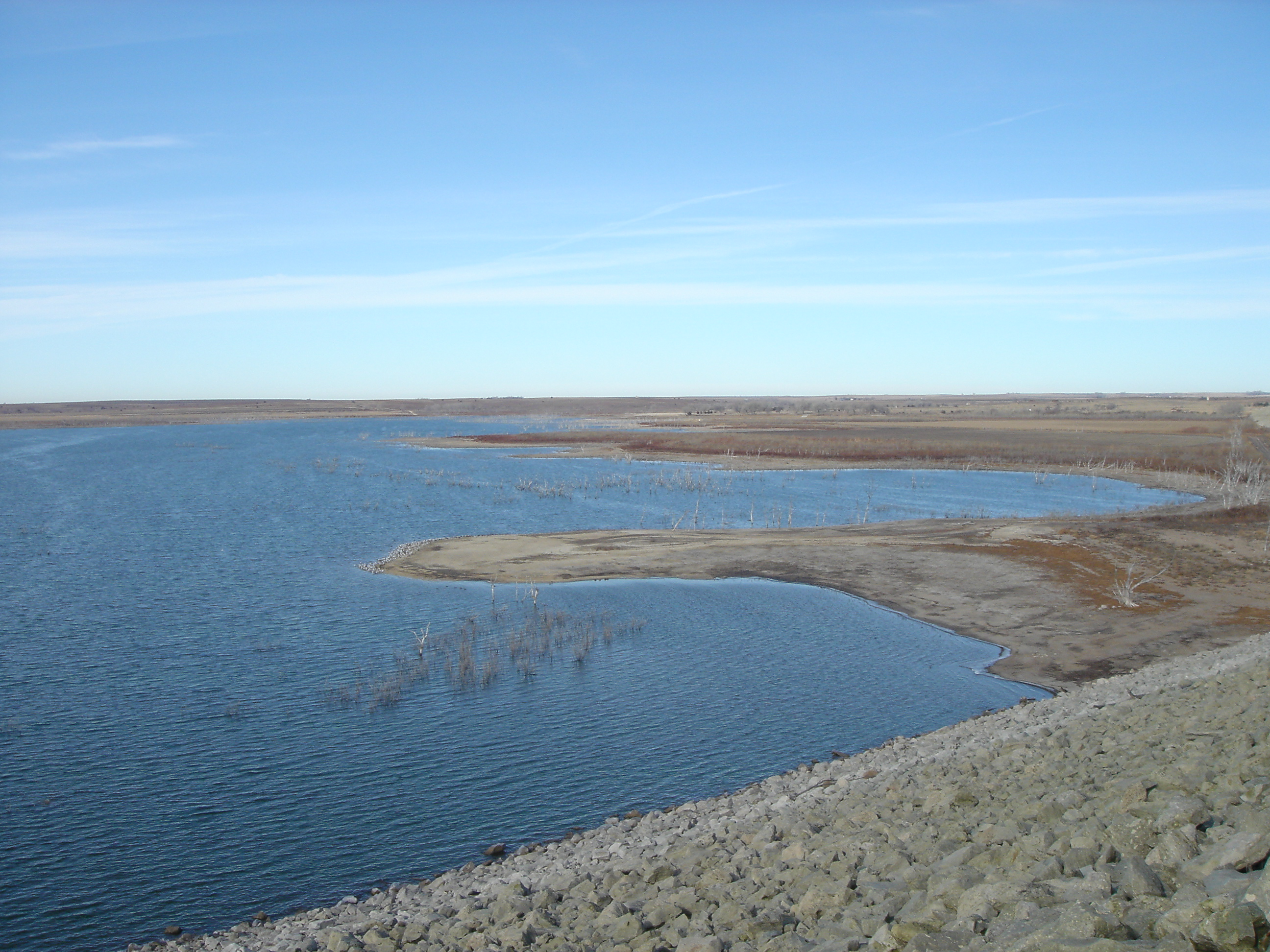

== See also ==
- List of Kansas state parks
- List of lakes, reservoirs, and dams in Kansas
- List of rivers of Kansas
