= Cedar Bluff Reservoir =

Reservoir in Kansas, United States

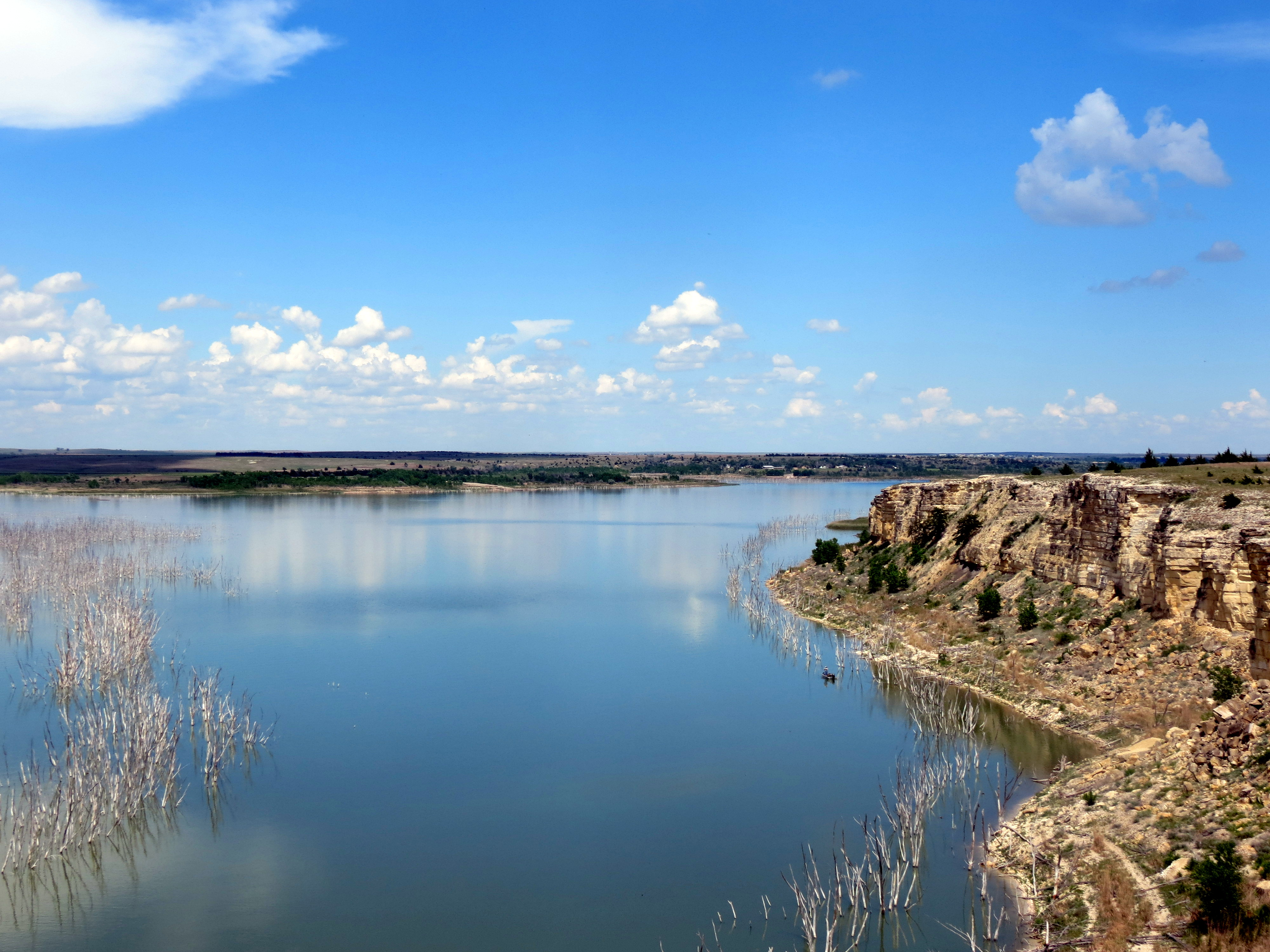
- Lake view from Cedar Bluff, the reservoir's namesake (2016)

- Location within Kansas Location within the United States

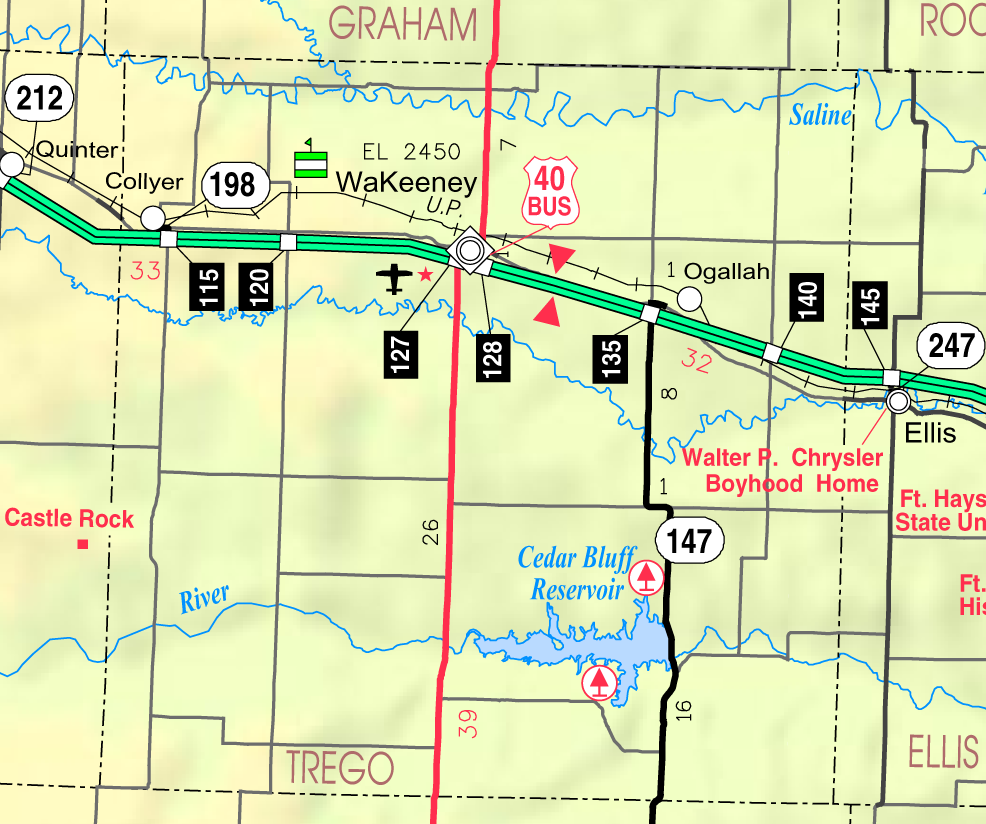
- KDOT map of Trego County (legend)
- Location: Trego County, Kansas
- Coordinates: 38°47′10.88″N 99°46′42.30″W
- Type: Reservoir
- Primary inflows: Smoky Hill River
- Primary outflows: Smoky Hill River
- Catchment area: 5,365 sq mi (13,900 km^{2})
- Basin countries: United States
- Managing agency: U.S. Bureau of Reclamation
- Built: April 1, 1949
- First flooded: September 29, 1951
- Max. length: 9 miles (14 km)
- Surface area: 6,869 acres (27.80 km^{2})
- Max. depth: 42 ft (13 m)
- Water volume: Full: 172,452 acre⋅ft (212,716,000 m^{3}); Current (Nov. 2015): 55,329 acre⋅ft (68,247,000 m^{3})
- Shore length^{1}: 50 mi (80 km)
- Surface elevation: Full: 2,144 ft (653 m); Current (Nov. 2015): 2,119 ft (646 m)
- Settlements: Brownell, Ogallah
- ^{1} Shore length is not a well-defined measure.

Cedar Bluff Reservoir is a reservoir in Trego County, Kansas, United States. Built and managed by the U.S. Bureau of Reclamation for irrigation and area water supply, it is also used for flood control and recreation. Cedar Bluff State Park is located on its shore.

== History ==
The severe drought in western Kansas during the 1930s created demand for irrigation projects and new sources for municipal water supplies. In response, the U.S. Bureau of Reclamation began investigating the Smoky Hill River basin in 1941 to determine what would be feasible, but the outbreak of World War II halted the effort. The Flood Control Act of 1944 authorized the creation of Cedar Bluff Reservoir as part of the Pick-Sloan Missouri Basin Program, and investigations resumed in 1945. Construction of the reservoir and Cedar Bluff Dam began April 1, 1949 and took over two years to complete, finishing September 29, 1951. Difficulties in organizing an irrigation district delayed construction of a water distribution system for several years. Finally, in 1958, the Cedar Bluff Irrigation District was organized. Construction of the 18-mile (29 km) Cedar Bluff Canal commenced in February 1961 and finished in July 1963. In April 1963, the city of Russell, Kansas signed a contract with the Bureau of Reclamation to use a portion of Cedar Bluff Reservoir as a municipal and industrial water supply.

In 1959, the Bureau of Sport Fisheries and Wildlife established the Cedar Bluff National Fish Hatchery immediately east of the dam. Receiving its water from the reservoir, the hatchery raised fish stocks to supply waters in western Kansas, eastern Colorado, Oklahoma, and Texas.

The flow of the Smoky Hill River decreased sharply starting in the late 1960s, likely due to an increase in ground water pumping and the high evaporation rate in the region. Use of the reservoir for irrigation ended in 1978, and the Canal was shut down. The fish hatchery closed in 1983 and was re-purposed to raise Canada geese. The Cedar Bluff Irrigation District dissolved in 1994, and control of the portion of reservoir capacity dedicated to irrigation transferred to the Kansas Water Office and the Kansas Department of Wildlife and Parks.

Since the end of irrigation operations, the primary uses of Cedar Bluff Reservoir have been for recreation, overseen by the Kansas Department of Wildlife and Parks, and for flood control and municipal water supply, managed by the Bureau of Reclamation.

== Geography ==
Cedar Bluff Reservoir is located at 38°47′30″N 99°52′41″W (38.7916792, -99.8781760) at an elevation of 2,149 feet (655 m). It lies in west-central Kansas in the Smoky Hills region of the Great Plains. The reservoir is located entirely within Trego County.

The reservoir is impounded at its eastern end by Cedar Bluff Dam. The dam is located at 38°47′38″N 99°43′21″W (38.7939014, -99.7226164) at an elevation of 2,192 feet (668 m). The Smoky Hill River is both the reservoir's primary inflow from the west and its outflow to the east. Smaller tributaries include Cedar Gorge, which flows north into the central part of the reservoir, and Page Creek, which feeds the reservoir's southeastern arm.

Kansas Highway 147 runs generally north-south along the reservoir's eastern shore and across the top of the dam.

== Hydrography ==
The surface area, surface elevation, and water volume of the reservoir fluctuate based on inflow and local climatic conditions. In terms of capacity, the Bureau of Reclamation vertically divides the reservoir into a set of pools based on volume and water level, and it considers the reservoir full when filled to the capacity of its active conservation pool. When full, Cedar Bluff Reservoir has a surface area of 6,869 acres (27.80 km^{2}), a surface elevation of 2,144 feet (653 m), and a volume of 172,452 acre⋅ft (212,716,000 m^{3}). When filled to maximum capacity, it has a surface area of 16,510 acres (66.8 km^{2}), a surface elevation of 2,192 feet (668 m), and a volume of 717,592 acre⋅ft (885,137,000 m^{3}).

The streambed underlying the reservoir has an elevation of 2,064 feet (629 m). Since the reservoir's initial flooding, sedimentation has gradually accumulated on the reservoir bottom thus raising its elevation.

== Infrastructure ==
Cedar Bluff Dam is a rolled earth-fill embankment dam with rock riprap on its upstream face. It has a structural height of 202 feet (62 m) and a length of 12,560 feet (3,830 m). At its crest, the dam has an elevation of 2,198 feet (670 m). An uncontrolled spillway is located at the south end of the dam. Gated outlet works through the base of the dam release water for downstream requirements.

== Management ==
The U.S. Bureau of Reclamation operates and maintains both the dam and the reservoir. The U.S. Army Corps of Engineers assists by providing data and information on water regulation for flood control. The Kansas Department of Wildlife, Parks and Tourism (KDWP) manages 9,300 acres (38 km^{2}) of land around the reservoir as the Cedar Bluff Wildlife Area.

== Parks and recreation ==
The KDWP operates Cedar Bluff State Park located on the reservoir's eastern end. The park is divided into two areas: the 350-acre (1.4 km^{2}) Bluffton Area on the north shore and the 500-acre (2.0 km^{2}) Page Creek Area on the south shore. Both areas include boat ramps and camping facilities. The Bluffton Area also has a swimming beach and sports facilities.

Cedar Bluff Reservoir is open for sport fishing year-round. Hunting is permitted on the public land around the reservoir although it is restricted in certain areas.

=== Points of interest ===
West of the park is Threshing Machine Canyon, the site of an 1867 American Indian attack on a wagon train carrying a threshing machine. The canyon walls still bear carvings dating back to the mid-1800s.

Located on the south shore of the reservoir's western end is the reservoir's namesake, Cedar Bluff. The 150-foot (46 m) limestone bluff provides a scenic view of the area.

== Wildlife ==
Fish species resident in Cedar Bluff Reservoir include black bass, bluegill, catfish, crappie, walleye, white bass, and wiper. Game animals living around the reservoir include mule deer, porcupines, pheasants, turkeys, and whitetail deer. Doves, ducks, and geese migrate through the area seasonally. Bald eagles and golden eagles visit in winter.

== Gallery ==
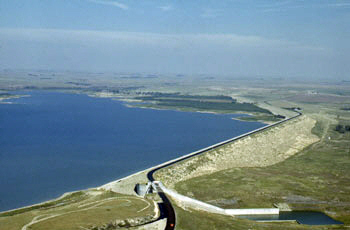
Cedar Bluff Dam

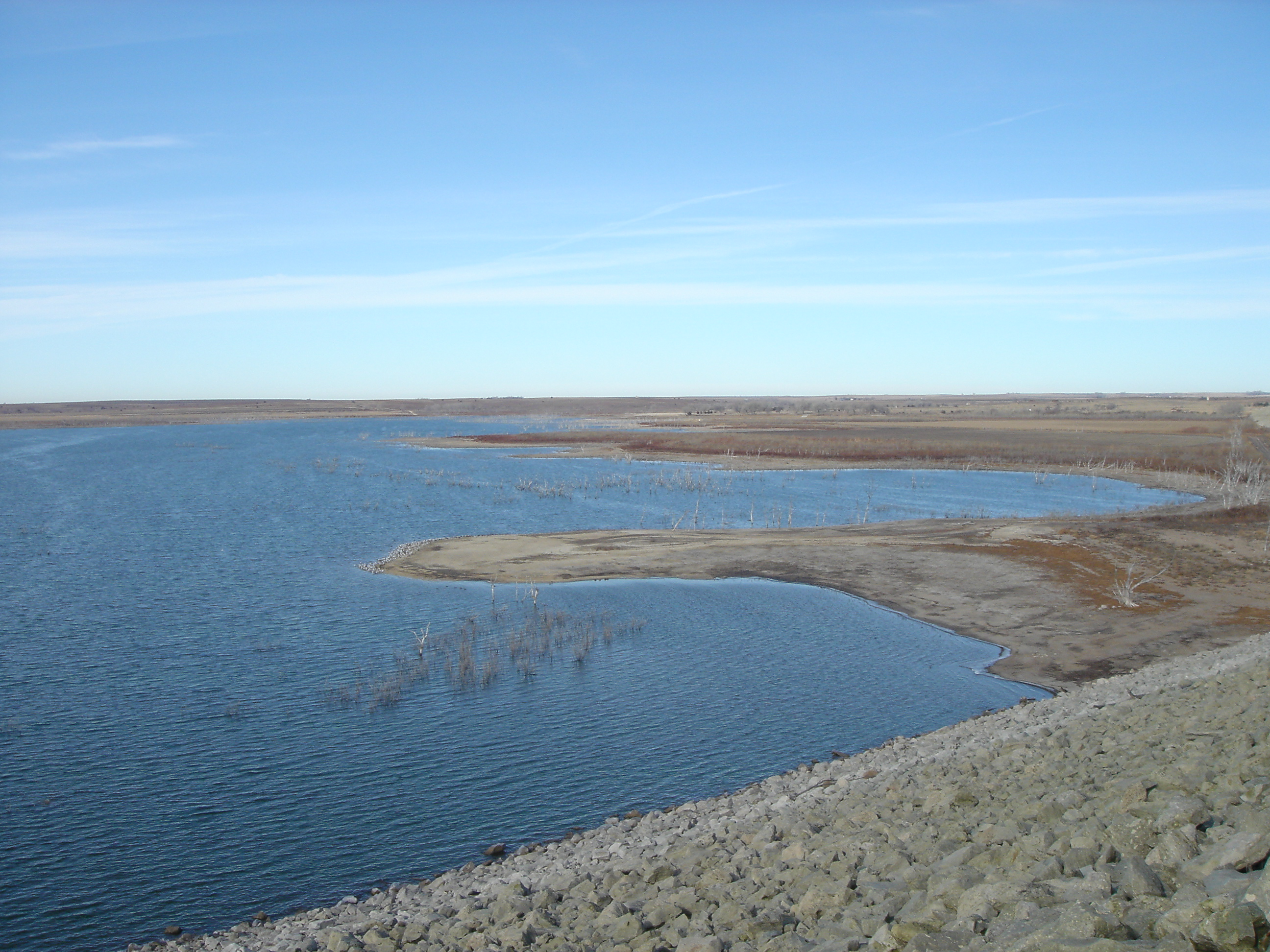
Westward lake view from Cedar Bluff Dam (2006)

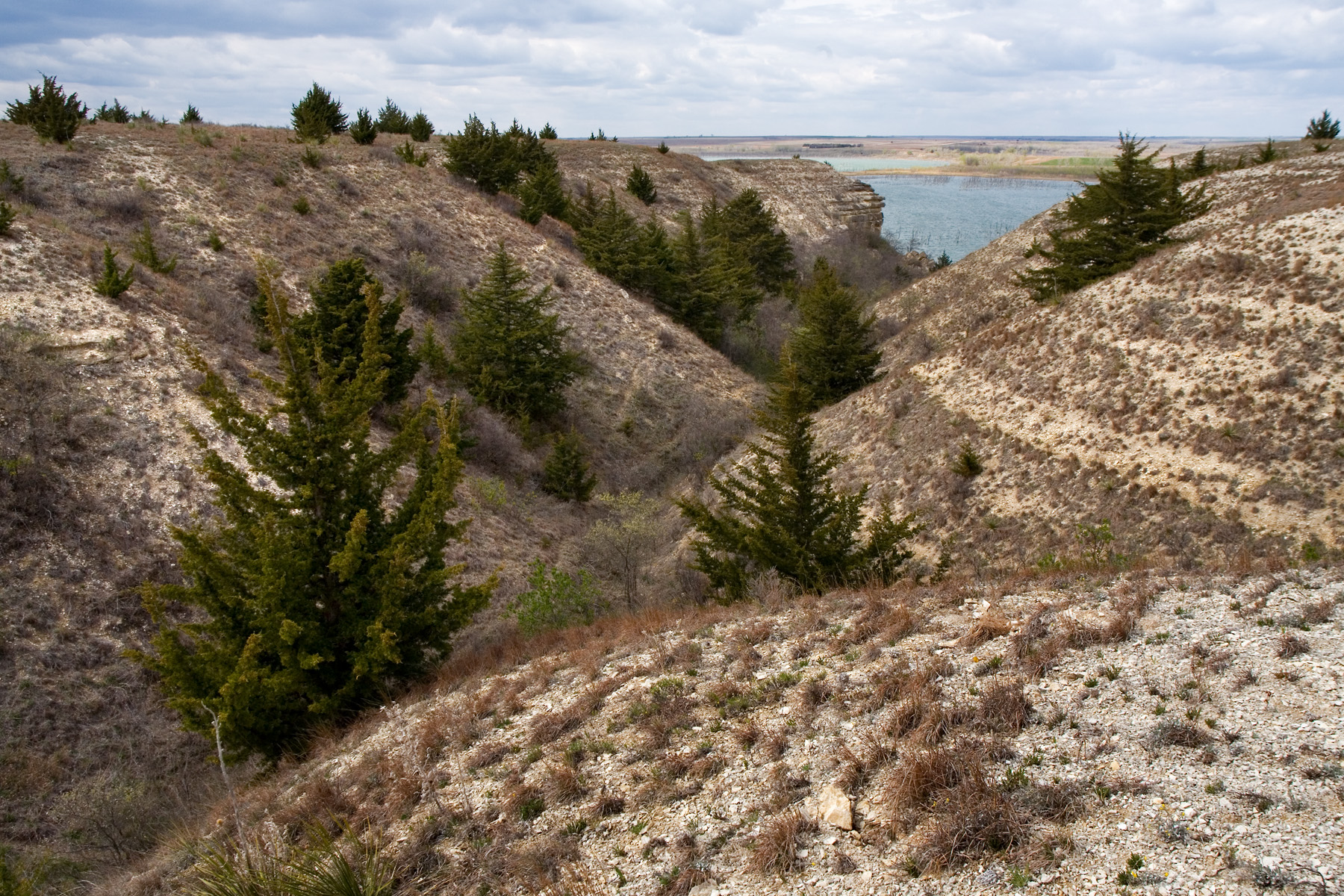
Ravine on the south side of the reservoir (2011)

== See also ==
- List of Kansas state parks
- List of lakes, reservoirs, and dams in Kansas
- List of rivers of Kansas
