= Smoky Hill River =

River in the United States

Smoky Hill River Aahkawirarahkata, Chetolah, Oke-see-sebo, River of the Padoucas, Mano'o'éo'hé'e (chy)
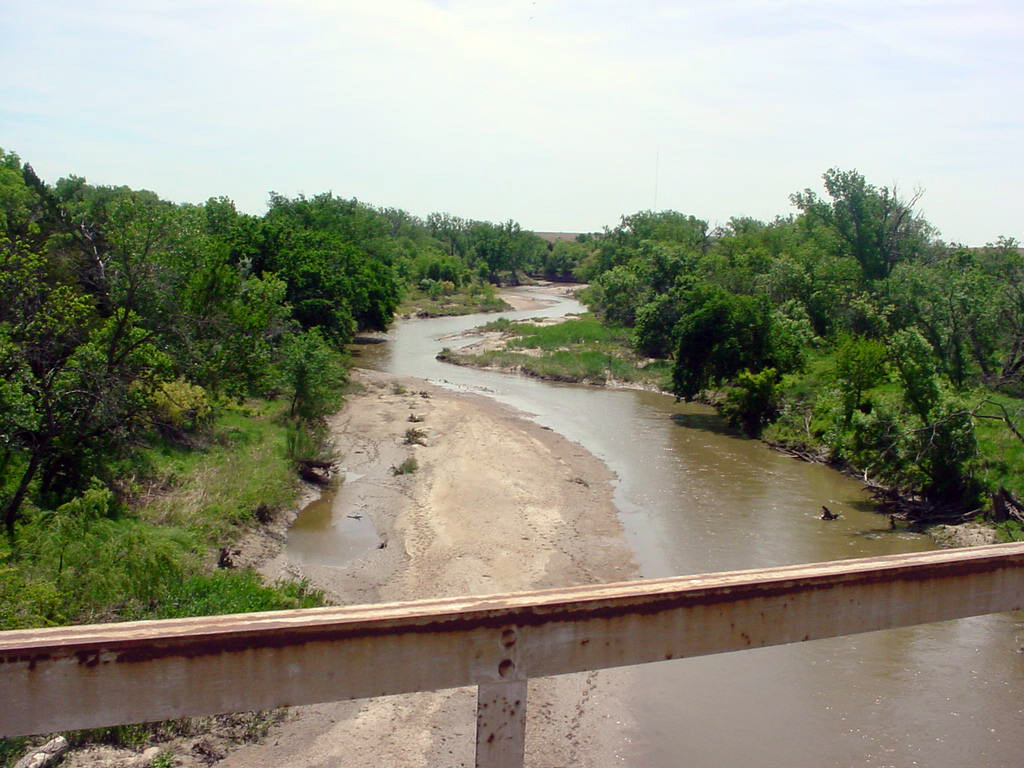
- Smoky Hill River near Assaria, Kansas

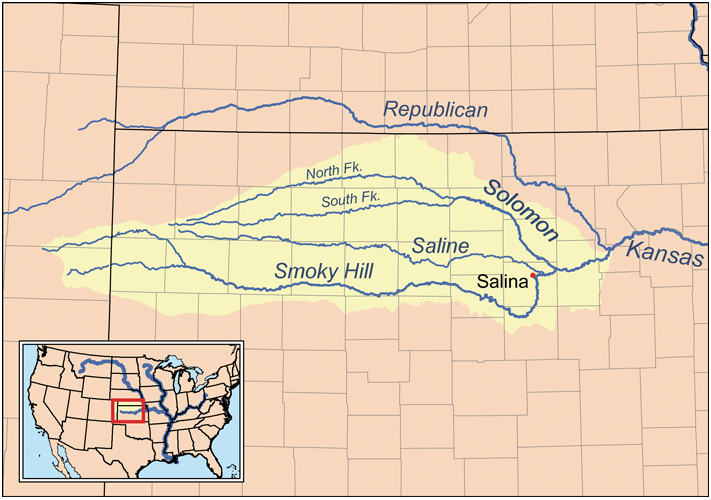
- Map of the Smoky Hill drainage basin

Location
- Country: United States
- State: Colorado, Kansas

Physical characteristics
- Source
  - location: Cheyenne County, Colorado
  - coordinates: 38°57′01″N 102°34′49″W
  - elevation: 4,640 ft (1,410 m)
- Mouth: Kansas River
  - location: Junction City, Kansas
  - coordinates: 39°03′36″N 98°46′04″W
  - elevation: 1,040 ft (320 m)
- Length: 575 mi (925 km)
- Basin size: 19,260 sq mi (49,900 km^{2})
- Discharge
  - location: USGS 06877600 at Enterprise, KS
  - average: 1,540 cu ft/s (44 m^{3}/s)
  - minimum: 38 cu ft/s (1.1 m^{3}/s)
  - maximum: 207,000 cu ft/s (5,900 m^{3}/s)

Basin features
- Tributaries
  - left: North Fork Smoky Hill River, Big Creek, Saline River, Solomon River
  - right: Ladder Creek
- Watersheds: Smoky Hill-Kansas-Missouri-Mississippi

The Smoky Hill River is a 575-mile (925 km) river in the central Great Plains of North America, running through Colorado and Kansas.

== Names ==
The Smoky Hill is named from the Smoky Hills region of north-central Kansas through which it flows. American Indians living along the Smoky Hill considered it and the Kansas River to be the same river, and their names for it included Chetolah and Okesee-sebo. Early maps of European explorers called the river (also in combination with the Kansas River) the River of the Padoucas as its source is located in what was then Padouca (Comanche) territory.

The USGS lists several other names, including Chitolah River, Fork of the Hill Buckaneuse, La Fourche de la Cote Boucaniere, La Touche de la Cote Bucanieus, Manoiyohe, Pe P'a, Sand River, Shallow River, Smoky Creek, Branche de la Montagne a la Fumee, Ka-i-urs-kuta, Oke-see-sebo River, and Rahota katit hibaru.

== Geography ==
The Smoky Hill River originates in the High Plains of eastern Colorado and flows east. Both the main course of it and of the North Fork Smoky Hill River rise in northern Cheyenne County, Colorado. The two streams converge roughly 5 miles (8 km) west of Russell Springs in Logan County, Kansas. From there, the river continues generally eastward through the Smoky Hills region. The Saline River joins it in eastern Saline County. The Solomon River joins the Smoky Hill River in western Dickinson County. The Smoky Hill River joins the Republican River at Junction City, Kansas to form the Kansas River.

The Smoky Hill River directly drains an area of 8,810 square miles (22,800 km^{2}). The combined Smoky Hill-Saline Basin drains 12,229 square miles (31,670 km^{2}). The entire Smoky Hill drainage basin covers approximately 20,000 square miles (52,000 km^{2}), including most of north-central and northwestern Kansas. Via the Kansas and Missouri Rivers, the Smoky Hill River is part of the Mississippi River watershed.

The Smoky Hill River feeds two reservoirs: Cedar Bluff Reservoir in Trego County and Kanopolis Lake in Ellsworth County.

The largest city along the Smoky Hill River is Salina, and other Kansas municipalities include Junction City, Ellsworth, Marquette, Lindsborg, and Abilene.

== History ==
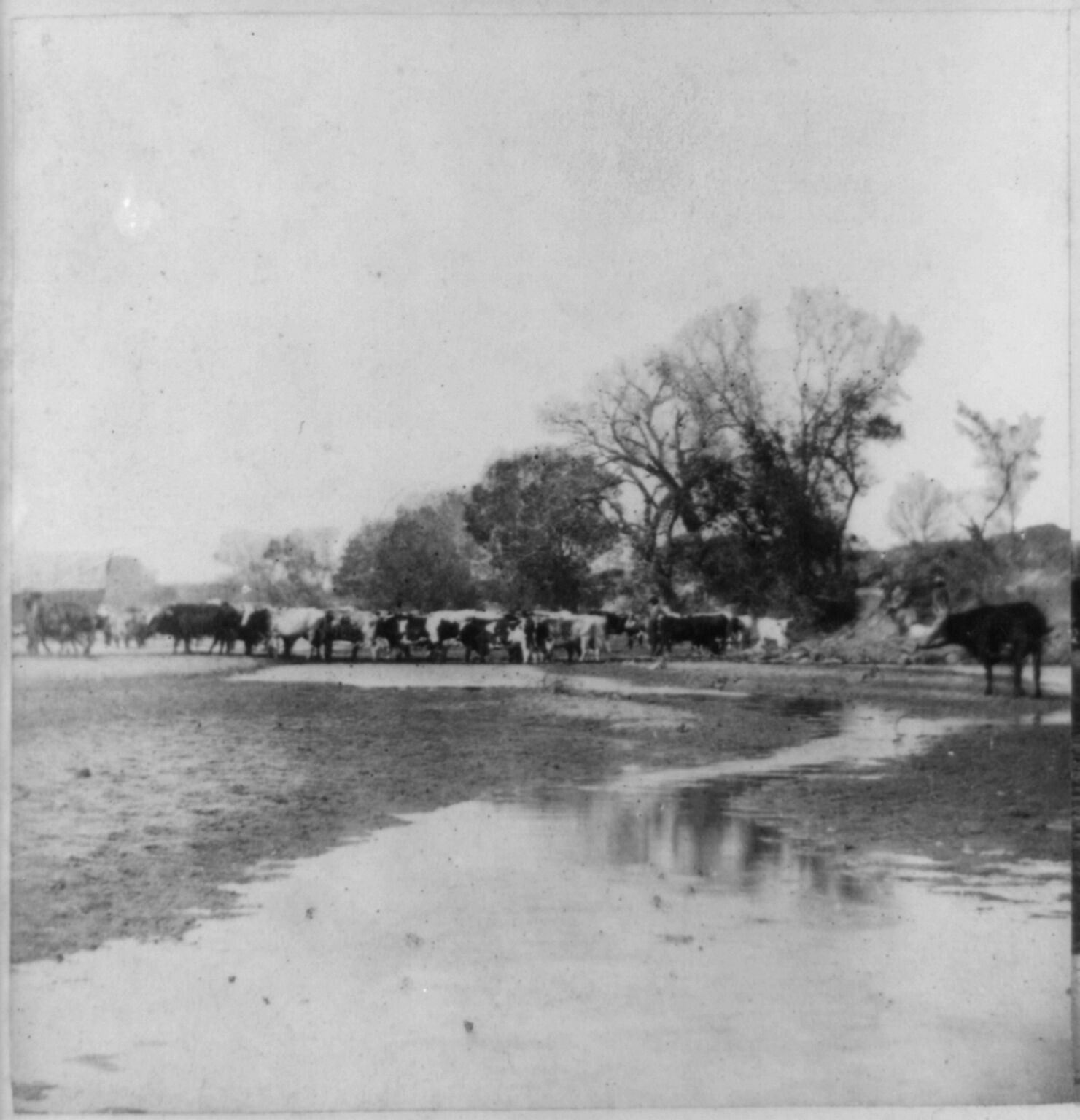
Cattle crossing the Smoky Hill River at Ellsworth (photo by A. Gardner, 1867).

The earliest known reference to the river is on a 1732 map by French cartographer Jean Baptiste Bourguignon d'Anville who labeled it the "River of the Padoucas". A 1758 map referred to it as the "Padoucas River". An early reference to the river as the Smoky Hill was by American explorer Zebulon Pike during his 1806 expedition to visit the Pawnee. The Kansas–Nebraska Act of 1854 established Kansas Territory, including the entire length of the Smoky Hill River.

With the onset of the Pike's Peak Gold Rush in 1858, an ancient American Indian trail along the river known as the Smoky Hill Trail provided the shortest, fastest route west across Kansas. Beginning in 1865, the trail was the route for the short-lived Butterfield Overland Despatch. To protect travelers, the U.S. Army established several forts along the trail, including Fort Downer, Fort Harker, Fort Hays, Fort Monument, and Fort Wallace. Before American colonization, the land along the Smoky Hill River was favored hunting ground for the Plains Indians. In 1867, the Comanche and the Kiowa, and in 1868, the Sioux and the Arapaho signed treaties withdrawing their opposition to the construction of a railroad along the Smoky Hill River. The Kansas Pacific Railway was completed in 1870, rendering the Smoky Hill Trail obsolete.

Former Danish labour leader Louis Pio founded a short-lived socialist colony in the area in 1877.

In 1948, the U.S. Army Corps of Engineers finished construction of a dam on the Smoky Hill for flood control in southeastern Ellsworth County creating Kanopolis Lake. In 1951, the United States Bureau of Reclamation completed another dam on the river, for irrigation and flood control, in southeastern Trego County, Kansas, which created Cedar Bluff Reservoir.

== See also ==
- List of rivers of Colorado
- List of rivers of Kansas
- Smoky Hills
