= National Register of Historic Places listings in Ness County, Kansas =

Location of Ness County in Kansas

This is a list of the National Register of Historic Places listings in Ness County, Kansas. It is intended to be a complete list of the properties and districts on the National Register of Historic Places in Ness County, Kansas, United States. The locations of National Register properties and districts for which the latitude and longitude coordinates are included below, may be seen in an online map.

There are 8 properties and districts listed on the National Register in the county.

This National Park Service list is complete through NPS recent listings posted September 4, 2026.

== Current listings ==
	Name on the Register	Image	Date listed	Location	City or town	Description
1	George Washington Carver Homestead Site	George Washington Carver Homestead Site	November 23, 1977 (#77000593)	1.5 miles (2.4 km) south of Beeler; 38°25′44″N 100°11′28″W	Beeler	
2	Indian Village on Pawnee Fork		June 17, 2010 (#07000609)	Address Restricted	Bazine	
3	Lion Block	Lion Block	October 16, 2008 (#08000986)	216 West Main St. 38°27′15″N 99°54′26″W	Ness City	
4	Ness County Bank	Ness County Bank	February 23, 1972 (#72000519)	Main St. and Pennsylvania Ave. 38°27′15″N 99°54′19″W	Ness City	
5	Ness County Bridge FS-450		March 27, 2017 (#100000803)	County Road 20; 38°17′27″N 99°44′18″W	Bazine	
6	Pawnee River Tributary Bridge	Pawnee River Tributary Bridge	July 2, 1985 (#85001446)	8 miles south of Bazine; 38°19′21″N 99°41′43″W	Bazine	
7	Thornburg Barn	Thornburg Barn	April 8, 2009 (#09000192)	Ness-Gove county line, 0.5 miles (0.8 km) west of D Road; 38°41′45″N 100°10′55″W	Utica	Agriculture-Related Resources of Kansas MPS
8	Henry Tilley House	Henry Tilley House	November 21, 2006 (#06001053)	108 W. 2nd St. 38°38′13″N 99°55′57″W	Ransom	

== See also ==
- List of National Historic Landmarks in Kansas
- National Register of Historic Places listings in Kansas
