= National Register of Historic Places listings in Trego County, Kansas =

Location of Trego County in Kansas

This is a list of the National Register of Historic Places listings in Trego County, Kansas. It is intended to be a complete list of the properties and districts on the National Register of Historic Places in Trego County, Kansas, United States. The locations of National Register properties and districts for which the latitude and longitude coordinates are included below, may be seen in an online map.

There are 8 properties and districts listed on the National Register in the county.

This National Park Service list is complete through NPS recent listings posted December 19, 2025.

== Current listings ==
	Name on the Register	Image	Date listed	Location	City or town	Description
1	Collyer Downtown Historic District	Collyer Downtown Historic District	January 7, 2010 (#09001207)	Area along Ainslie Ave., roughly bounded by 2nd St. on the north and 4th St. on the south 39°02′19″N 100°07′04″W	Collyer	
2	Keraus Hardware Store		October 10, 2023 (#100009418)	121 North Main St. 39°01′29″N 99°53′02″W	WaKeeney	
3	Lipp Barn	Lipp Barn	July 8, 2009 (#09000501)	17054 130th Ave. 39°01′22″N 100°06′36″W	Collyer	
4	St. Michael School & Convent	St. Michael School & Convent	April 16, 2008 (#08000310)	700 and 704 Ainslie Ave. 39°01′55″N 100°07′02″W	Collyer	
5	Stradal House	Stradal House	March 2, 2001 (#01000193)	409 N. 13th St. 39°01′44″N 99°52′19″W	WaKeeney	
6	Trego County Fairgrounds Exhibit Building	Trego County Fairgrounds Exhibit Building	January 28, 2004 (#03001500)	Tract 10-12-23, Trego County Fairgrounds; 39°01′32″N 99°52′13″W	WaKeeney	
7	Walsh Archeological District		January 15, 1985 (#85000091)	Address restricted	Collyer	
8	Wilcox School-District 29	Wilcox School-District 29	May 17, 2006 (#06000393)	U.S. Hwy 283 at X Rd; 38°47′54″N 99°53′35″W	Ransom	

== See also ==
- List of National Historic Landmarks in Kansas
- National Register of Historic Places listings in Kansas
