= Indian Village =

Indian Village may refer to:

India

- Village#India

United States

- Indian Village, California
- Indian Village, Chicago, Illinois
- Indian Village, Indiana
- Indian Village Historic District (Fort Wayne, Indiana), listed on the National Register of Historic Places (NRHP)
- Indian Village, Noble County, Indiana
- Indian Village, Tippecanoe County, Indiana
- Indian Village on Pawnee Fork, NRHP-listed in Ness County, Kansas
- Indian Village, Louisiana, in Iberville Parish, Louisiana
- Indian Village, Detroit, Michigan
- Indian Village, Bronx, New York
- Indian Village, Oregon

== See also ==
- Indian Village State Preserve, near Sutherland, Iowa
- Indian Village Township, Tama County, Iowa
- Indian Village Historic District (disambiguation)
- Indian Creek Village (disambiguation)
