= Arnold, Kansas =

Unincorporated community in Ness County, Kansas

- Unincorporated community
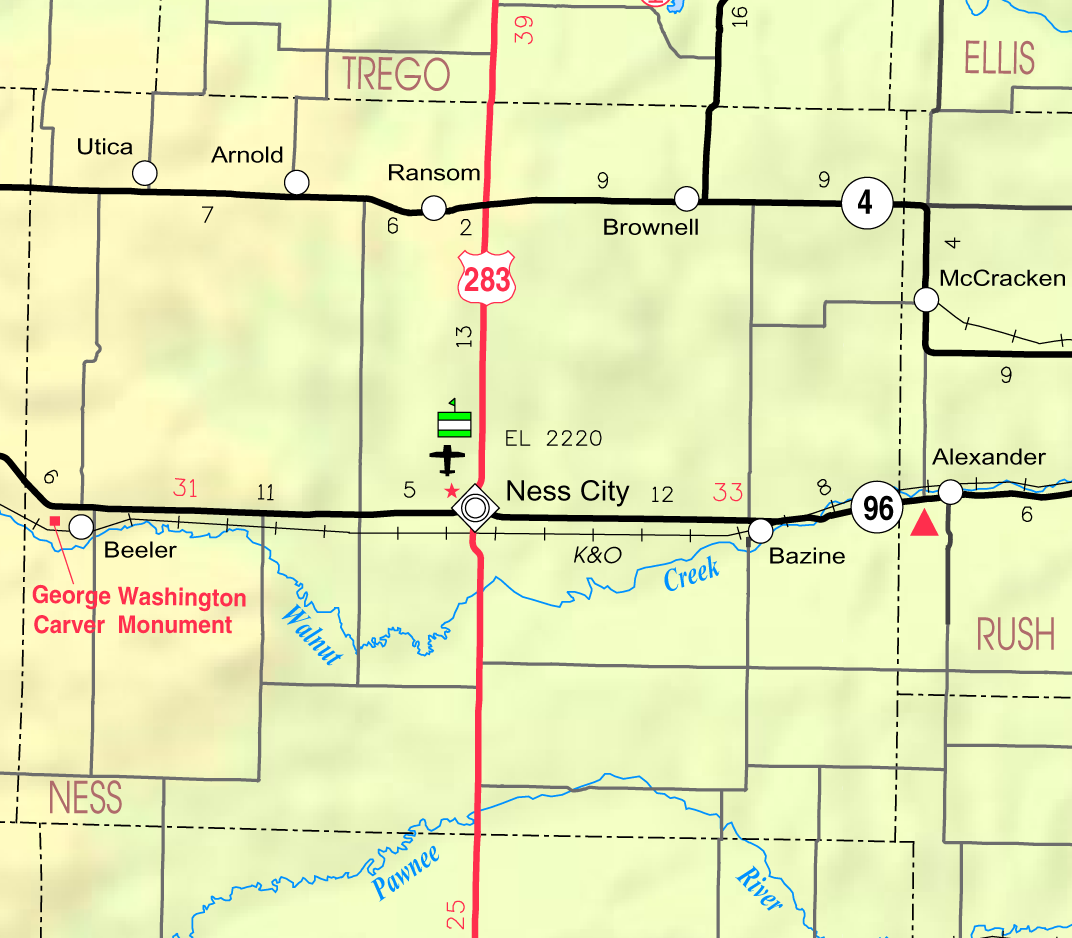
- KDOT map of Ness County (legend)

- Location within Kansas Location within the United States
- Coordinates: 38°38′25″N 100°2′46″W
- Country: United States
- State: Kansas
- County: Ness
- Elevation: 2,566 ft (782 m)
- Time zone: UTC-6 (CST)
  - Summer (DST): UTC-5 (CDT)
- ZIP Code: 67515
- Area code: 785
- FIPS code: 20-02425
- GNIS ID: 484557

Arnold is an unincorporated community in Ness County, Kansas, United States. It lies along K-4, north-northwest of the city of Ness City.

== History ==
Arnold was a station and shipping point on the Missouri Pacific Railroad.

The first post office in Arnold was established in about 1902. It was closed in 2006.

== Education ==
The community is served by Western Plains USD 106 public school district. The Western Plains High School mascot is Bobcats.

Arnold became a part of the Ransom school district in 1960. The Arnold School closed in 1969. USD 106 formed in 2004 by the consolidation of Ransom USD 302 and Bazine USD 304.
