= Indian Village Historic District =

Indian Village Historic District may refer to:

- Indian Village Historic District (Fort Wayne, Indiana), listed on the National Register of Historic Places (NRHP)
- Indian Village Historic District (Detroit, Michigan), NRHP-listed

== See also ==
- Indian Village (disambiguation)
