= Bazine, Kansas =

City in Ness County, Kansas

- City
- Location within Ness County and Kansas

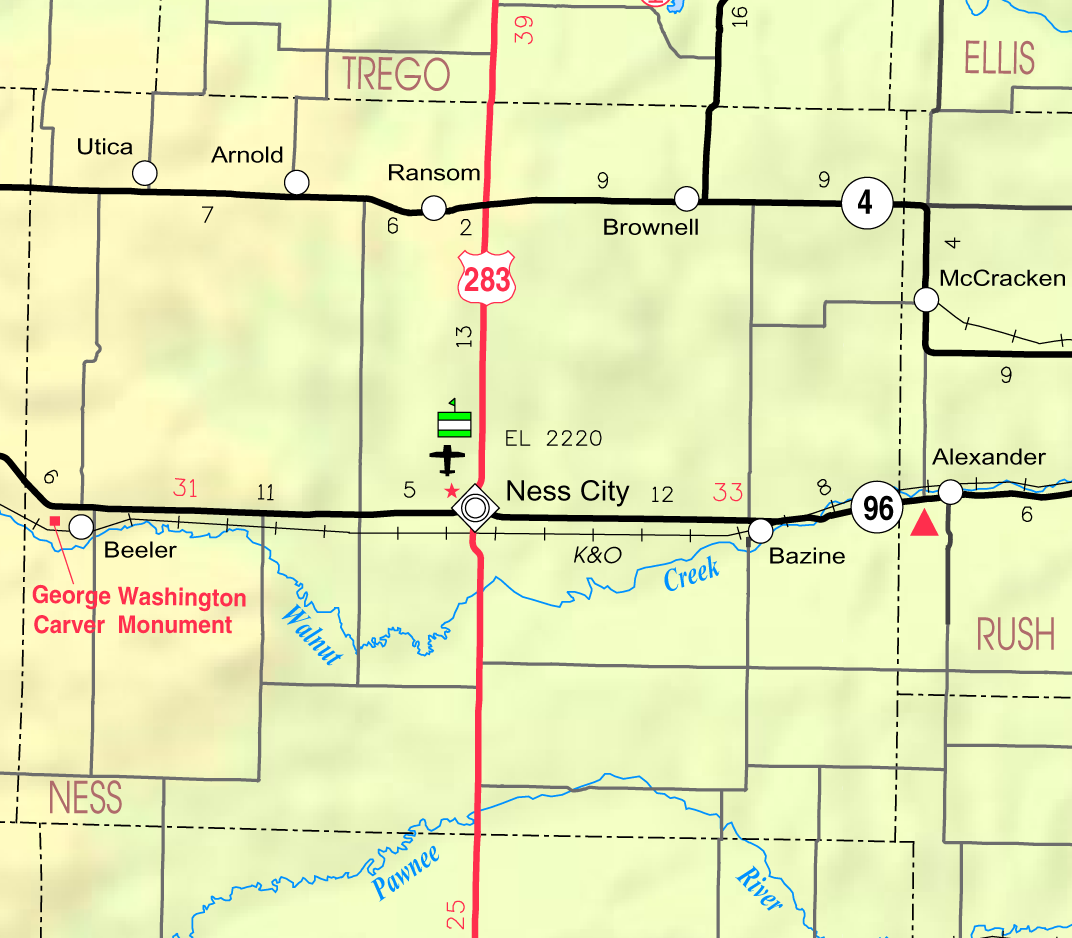
- KDOT map of Ness County (legend)
- Coordinates: 38°26′46″N 99°41′35″W
- Country: United States
- State: Kansas
- County: Ness
- Founded: 1870s
- Incorporated: 1924
- Named for: François Bazaine

Area
  - Total: 0.45 sq mi (1.16 km^{2})
  - Land: 0.45 sq mi (1.16 km^{2})
  - Water: 0 sq mi (0.00 km^{2})
- Elevation: 2,129 ft (649 m)

Population (2020)
  - Total: 282
  - Density: 630/sq mi (243/km^{2})
- Time zone: UTC-6 (CST)
  - Summer (DST): UTC-5 (CDT)
- ZIP Code: 67516
- Area code: 785
- FIPS code: 20-04775
- GNIS ID: 2394091
- Website: cityofbazine.com

Bazine is a city in Ness County, Kansas, United States. As of the 2020 census, the population of the city was 282.

== History ==
Bazine was a station and shipping point on the Atchison, Topeka and Santa Fe Railway. The community was named for the French general François Achille Bazaine.

The first post office in Bazine was established in 1874.

== Geography ==
According to the United States Census Bureau, the city has a total area of 0.44 square miles (1.14 km^{2}), all land.

=== Climate ===
The climate in this area is characterized by hot, humid summers and generally mild to cool winters. According to the Köppen Climate Classification system, Bazine has a humid subtropical climate, abbreviated "Cfa" on climate maps.

== Demographics ==
Historical population
Census	Pop.	Note	%±
1930	423		—
1940	465		9.9%
1950	456		−1.9%
1960	429		−5.9%
1970	386		−10.0%
1980	385		−0.3%
1990	373		−3.1%
2000	311		−16.6%
2010	334		7.4%
2020	282		−15.6%
U.S. Decennial Census

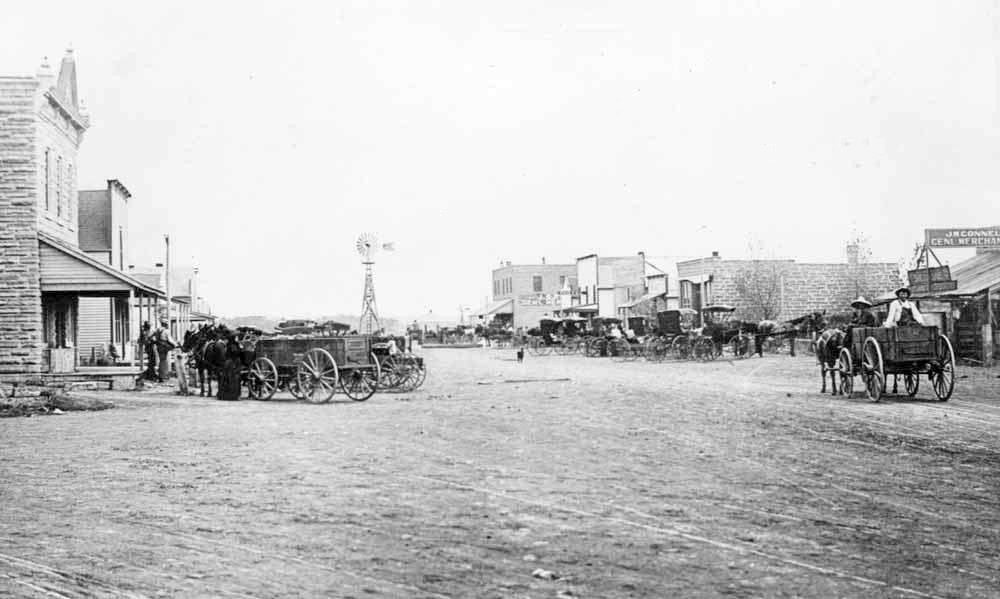
Bazine, circa 1900 to 1919

=== 2020 census ===
The 2020 United States census counted 282 people, 116 households, and 85 families in Bazine. The population density was 628.1 per square mile (242.5/km^{2}). There were 164 housing units at an average density of 365.3 per square mile (141.0/km^{2}). The racial makeup was 65.96% (186) white or European American (65.6% non-Hispanic white), 0.0% (0) black or African-American, 0.35% (1) Native American or Alaska Native, 0.0% (0) Asian, 0.35% (1) Pacific Islander or Native Hawaiian, 19.86% (56) from other races, and 13.48% (38) from two or more races. Hispanic or Latino of any race was 29.43% (83) of the population.

Of the 116 households, 34.5% had children under the age of 18; 59.5% were married couples living together; 14.7% had a female householder with no spouse or partner present. 20.7% of households consisted of individuals and 12.9% had someone living alone who was 65 years of age or older. The average household size was 2.8 and the average family size was 3.5. The percent of those with a bachelor's degree or higher was estimated to be 7.4% of the population.

27.0% of the population was under the age of 18, 7.1% from 18 to 24, 20.9% from 25 to 44, 23.4% from 45 to 64, and 21.6% who were 65 years of age or older. The median age was 39.2 years. For every 100 females, there were 104.3 males. For every 100 females ages 18 and older, there were 104.0 males.

The 2016–2020 5-year American Community Survey estimates show that the median household income was $41,250 (with a margin of error of +/- $11,691) and the median family income was $51,250 (+/- $15,813). Males had a median income of $51,083 (+/- $687) versus $11,250 (+/- $6,736) for females. The median income for those above 16 years old was $43,125 (+/- $18,207). Approximately, 21.7% of families and 16.5% of the population were below the poverty line, including 23.0% of those under the age of 18 and 4.8% of those ages 65 or over.

=== 2010 census ===
As of the census of 2010, there were 334 people, 135 households, and 92 families residing in the city. The population density was 759.1 inhabitants per square mile (293.1/km^{2}). There were 179 housing units at an average density of 406.8 per square mile (157.1/km^{2}). The racial makeup of the city was 83.8% White, 2.4% Native American, 12.3% from other races, and 1.5% from two or more races. Hispanic or Latino of any race were 25.7% of the population.

There were 135 households, of which 30.4% had children under the age of 18 living with them, 58.5% were married couples living together, 6.7% had a female householder with no husband present, 3.0% had a male householder with no wife present, and 31.9% were non-families. 27.4% of all households were made up of individuals, and 13.4% had someone living alone who was 65 years of age or older. The average household size was 2.47 and the average family size was 3.01.

The median age in the city was 37.8 years. 28.4% of residents were under the age of 18; 5.2% were between the ages of 18 and 24; 23.7% were from 25 to 44; 24.6% were from 45 to 64; and 18.3% were 65 years of age or older. The gender makeup of the city was 49.4% male and 50.6% female.

== Education ==
The community is served by Western Plains USD 106 public school district. The Western Plains High School mascot is Bobcats.

USD 106 formed in 2004 by the consolidation of Ransom USD 302 and Bazine USD 304. Since 2004 Bazine hosts the junior high school while Ransom hosts the high school, with each community having an elementary school. Bazine High School was closed through school unification. The Bazine High School mascot was Indians.

=== Bazine High School ===
The last year the school was open, there was a total enrollment of 41 students, six of whom graduated. Students were dispersed to other schools in the county including Ness City and Ransom schools.

In 2004, Bazine High School was listed on eBay. The 78-year-old building was purchased by a California businessman for $55,000.
