= Lipp Barn =

- U.S. National Register of Historic Places
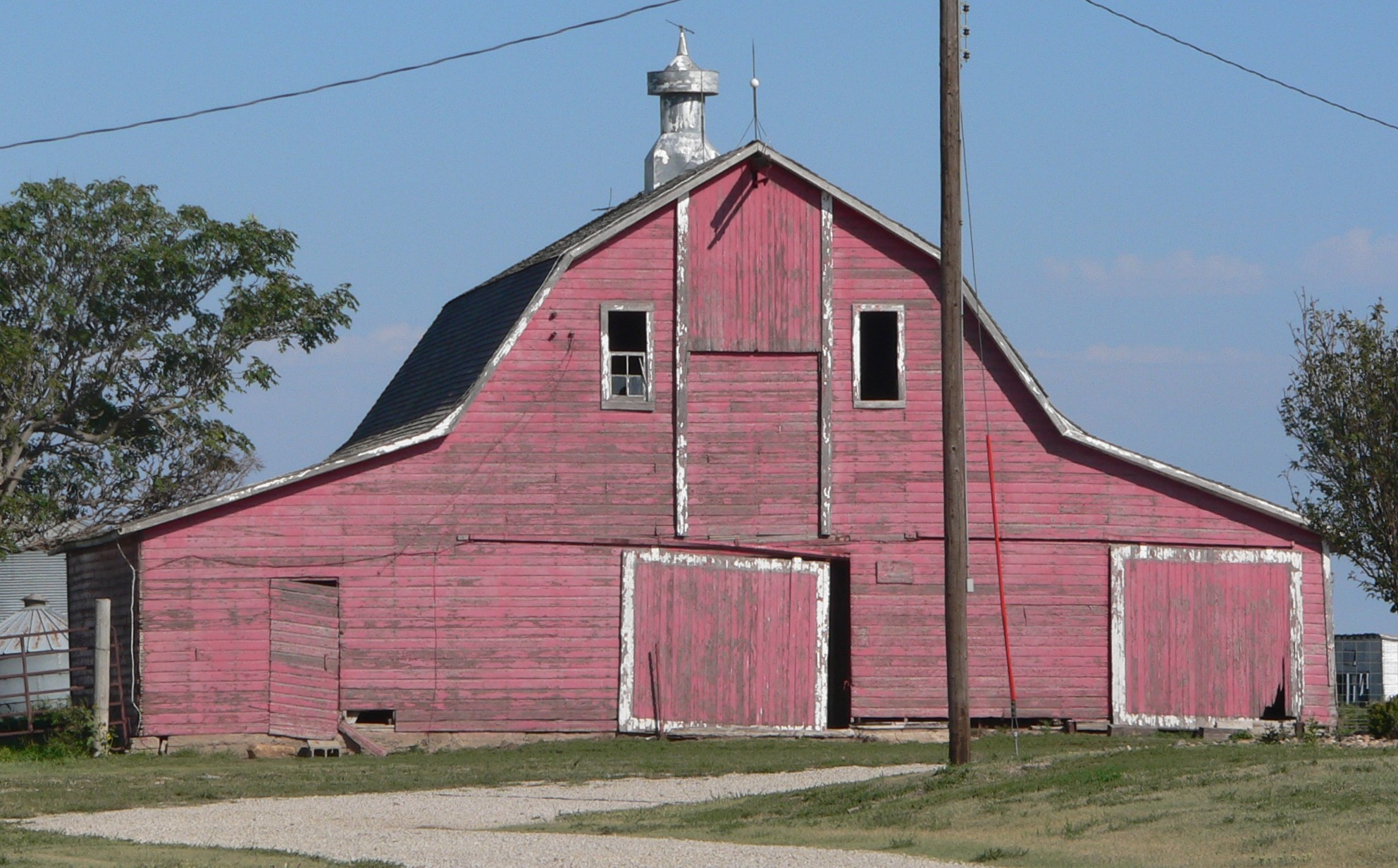
- The Lipp Barn in 2014

- Location within Kansas Location within the United States
- Location: 17054 130th Ave., Collyer, Kansas
- Coordinates: 39°01′22″N 100°06′36″W
- Area: Less than one acre
- Built: 1917
- Built by: Lipp, Phillip; et.al.
- Architectural style: Midwest Prairie Barn
- MPS: Agriculture-Related Resources of Kansas
- NRHP reference No.: 09000501
- Added to NRHP: July 8, 2009

The Lipp Barn, located at 17054 130th Ave. in Collyer, Kansas, was built in 1917. It was listed on the National Register of Historic Places in 2009.

It is a Midwest Prairie-style barn. It is two-stories tall with a gambrel roof. It is 50 by 40 feet (15 m × 12 m) in plan.
