= Western Plains USD 106 =

Public school district in Ransom, Kansas

Address
- 100 School St. Ransom, Kansas, 67572; United States
- Coordinates: 38°38′27″N 99°55′55″W

District information
- Type: Public
- Grades: K to 12
- Schools: 2

Other information
- Website: usd106.org

Western Plains USD 106 is a public unified school district headquartered in Ransom, Kansas, United States. The district includes the communities of Ransom, Arnold, Bazine, Brownell, Utica, and nearby rural areas.

== Schools ==
The school district operates the following schools:

- Western Plains High School in Ransom
- Western Plains South Elementary/Junior High School in Bazine
- Western Plains North Elementary School in Ransom

== History ==
In 1945 (after World War II), the School Reorganization Act in Kansas caused the consolidation of thousands of rural school districts in Kansas.

In 1963, the School Unification Act in Kansas caused the further consolidatation of thousands of tiny school districts into hundreds of larger Unified School Districts.

USD 106 was formed in 2004 by the consolidation of Ransom USD 302 and Bazine USD 304.

In 2005, NesTre La Go USD 301 dissolved, and most of its students moved to Western Plains USD 106.

On Friday, August 21, 2026 Superintendent and Principal of over a decade Jeff Jones was arrested in school. Jones was arrested on ten charges including misuse of public funds, theft, permitting a false claim, misconduct, encouraging of a child to commit a felony, and aggravated intimidation of a witness.

== See also ==
- Kansas State Department of Education
- Kansas State High School Activities Association
- List of high schools in Kansas
- List of unified school districts in Kansas
