= George Washington Carver Homestead Site =

- Carver, George Washington, Homestead Site
- U.S. National Register of Historic Places
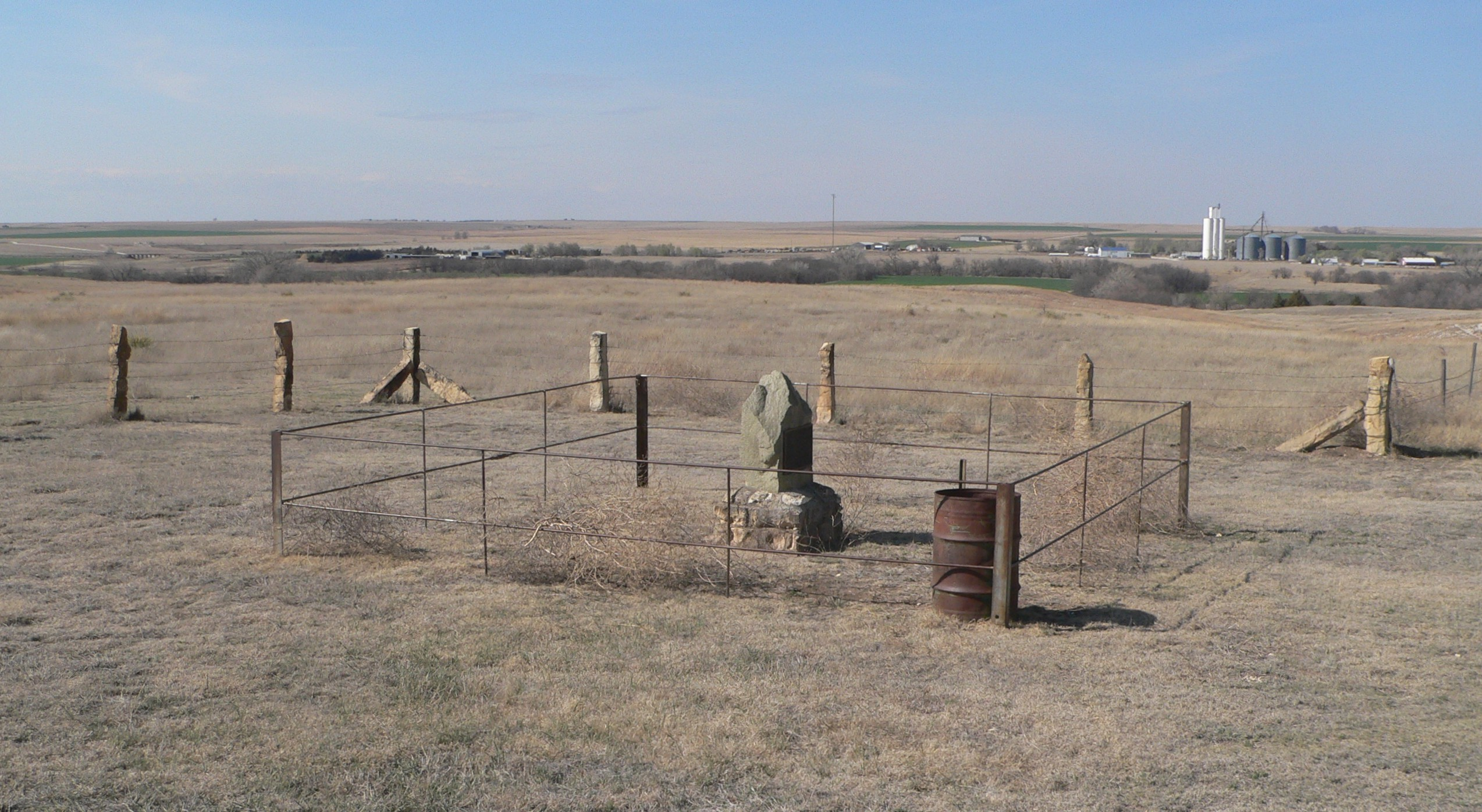

- Location within Kansas Location within the United States
- Nearest city: Beeler, Kansas
- Area: 160 acres (65 ha)
- Built: 1886
- NRHP reference No.: 77000593
- Added to NRHP: November 23, 1977

The George Washington Carver Homestead Site, near Beeler, Kansas, is a 160 acres (65 ha) area which was listed on the National Register of Historic Places in 1977.

On this property George Washington Carver built a sod house, broke ground, and planted crops and trees. Carver was one of few black homesteaders in Ness County, Kansas, but had skill in building sod buildings and was helpful to others.
