= Indian Creek Village =

Indian Creek Village may refer to:

- Indian Creek Village, Maryland
- Indian Creek, Florida
