= Lion Block =

- U.S. National Register of Historic Places
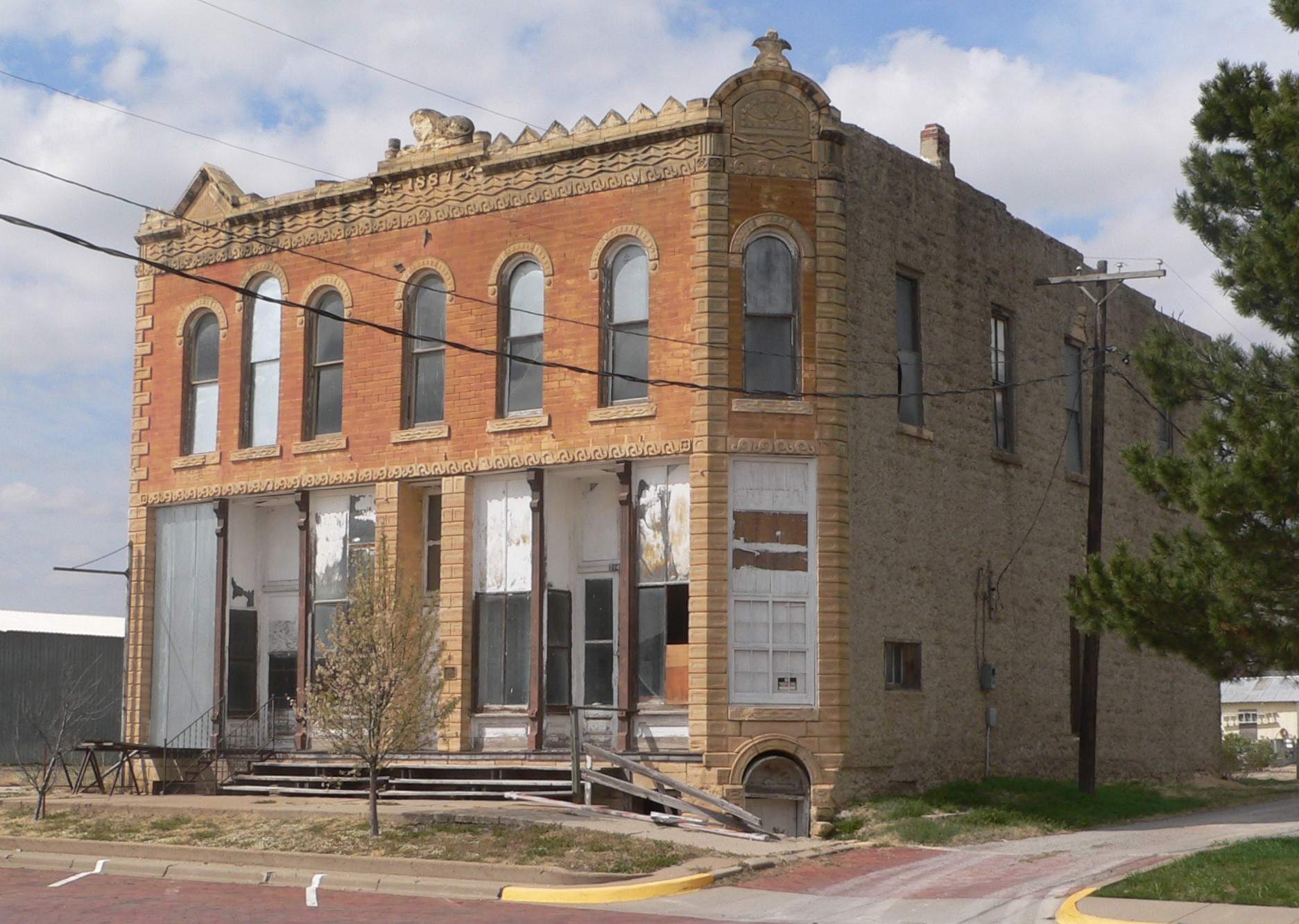
- Lion Block in 2016

- Location within Kansas
- Location: 216 West Main, Ness City, Kansas
- Coordinates: 38.454133°N 99.907258°W
- Area: less than one acre
- Built: 1887
- Built by: Henry Tilley
- Architectural style: Italianate
- NRHP reference No.: 08000986
- Added to NRHP: October 16, 2008

The Lion Block, at 216 West Main in Ness City, Kansas in Ness County, Kansas, was built in 1887 and includes, in its parapet wall, a lion carved by stonemason Henry Tilley, for which the building is named. It was listed on the National Register of Historic Places in 2008.

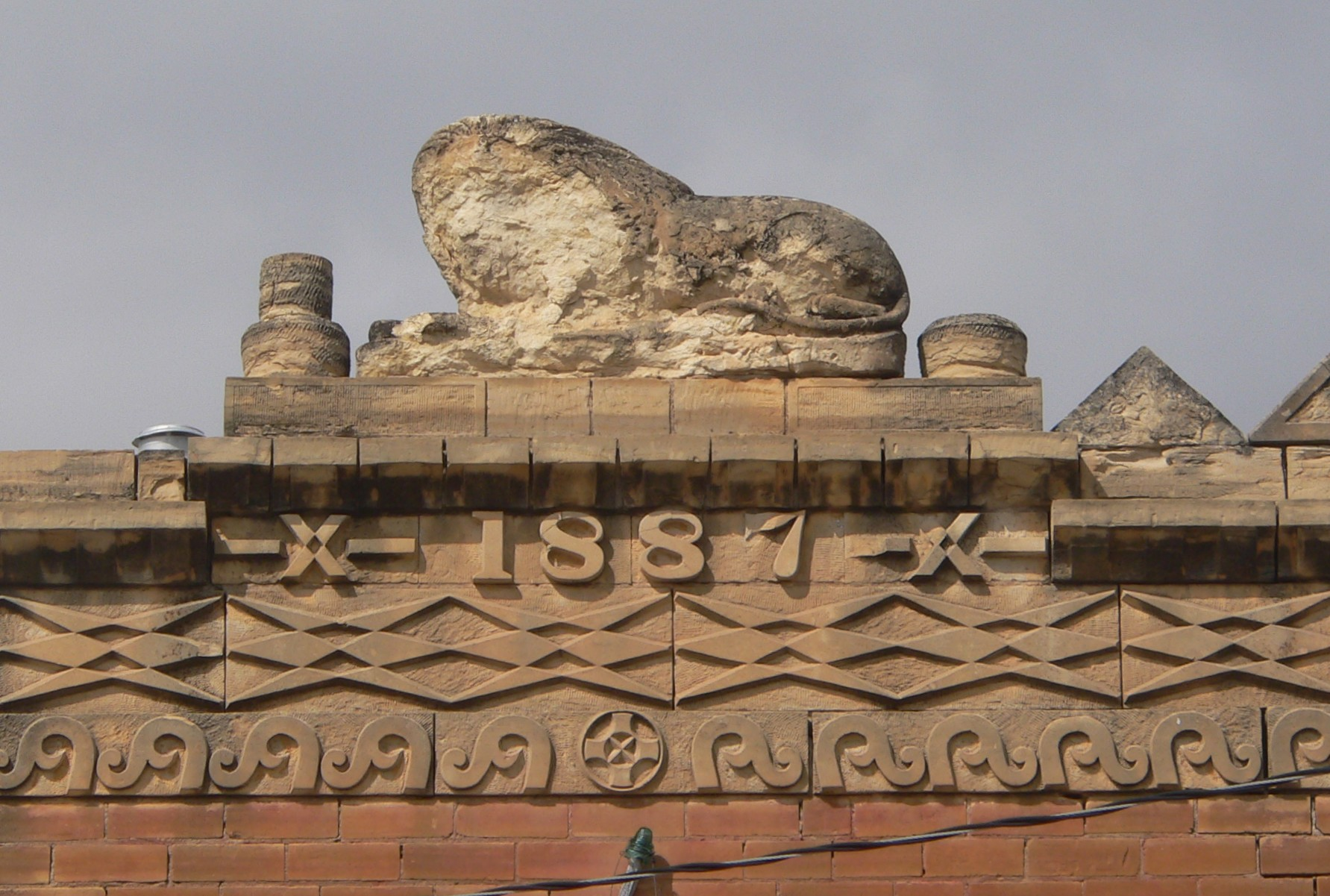
The lion, above "1887", somewhat deteriorated

It is a two-story two-part commercial building. The building shared a party wall, its west wall, with adjacent building which was not nominated for NRHP listing, and which was demolished some time after 2008 and before 2016. (Note: Photos from 2016 show the Lion Block standing alone; 2021 Google satellite imagery shows the same.) The two buildings faced south onto the courthouse square which holds the Ness County Courthouse. The front of the Lion Block includes two storefronts with iron framing manufactured by the 1886-founded Capital Iron Works company of Topeka, Kansas.

It is Victorian in style with elements of Italianate, such as in its round-topped windows. It was "nominated to the National Register for its architectural significance as a highly decorative and unique Italianate-style commercial building."

Among other functions, it served as a meeting house for the local Oddfellows group.

The McFarland Block, the adjacent building, survived in 2008.
