= Collyer Downtown Historic District =

Historic district in Kansas, United States

- U.S. National Register of Historic Places
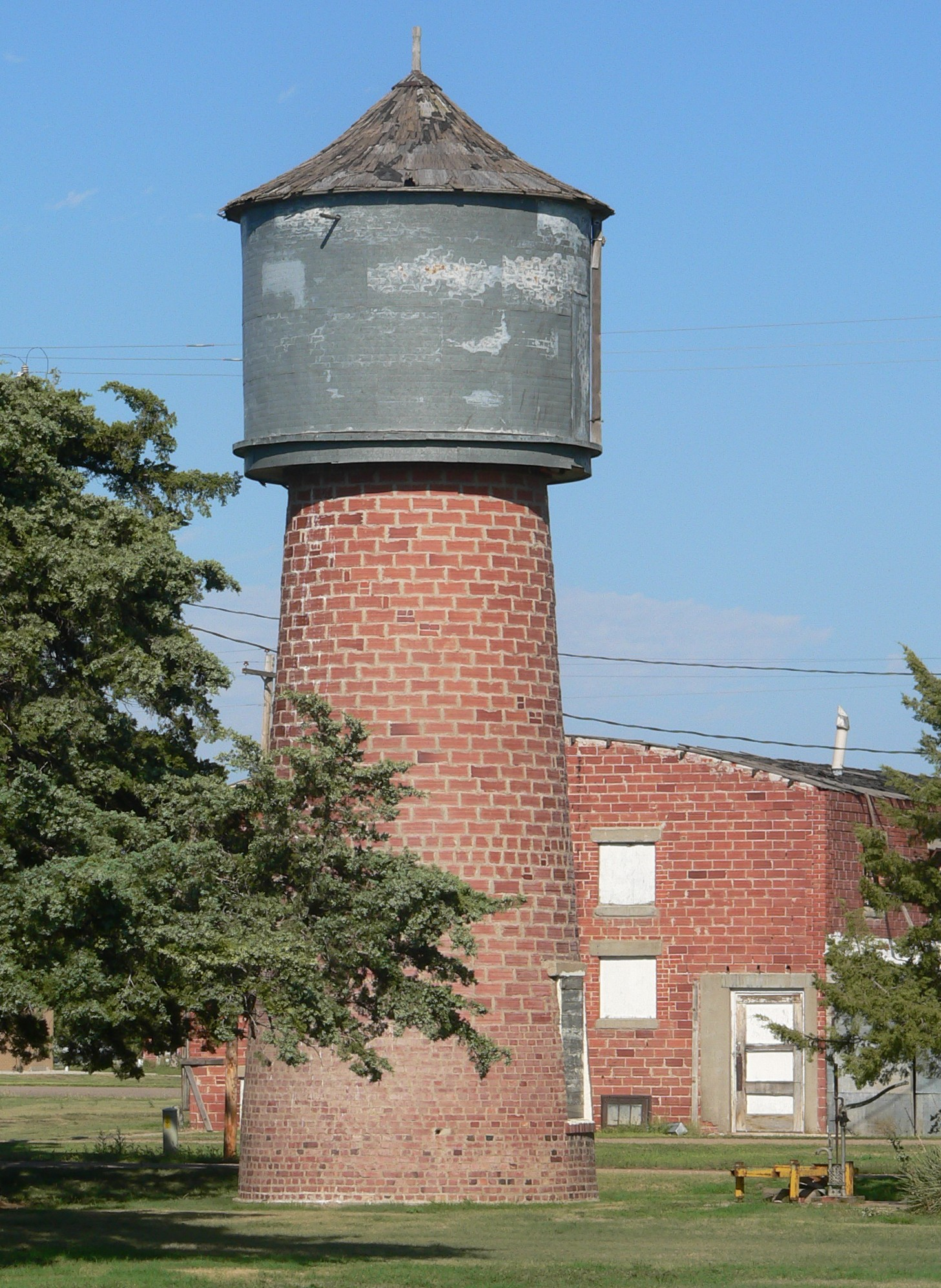

- Location within Kansas Location within the United States
- Location: Area along Ainslie Ave., roughly bounded by 2nd St. on the N. and 4th St. on the S., Collyer, Kansas
- Coordinates: 39°02′19″N 100°07′04″W
- Area: 2 acres (0.81 ha)
- Built: 1926
- Architectural style: Early Commercial
- NRHP reference No.: 09001207
- Added to NRHP: January 7, 2010

The Collyer Downtown Historic District is a 2 acres (0.81 ha) historic district in Collyer, Kansas, USA. It was listed on the National Register of Historic Places in 2010. The listing included 10 contributing buildings and two contributing structures.

The district includes two historic water towers and a city hall.
