= Utica, Kansas =

City in Ness County, Kansas

- City
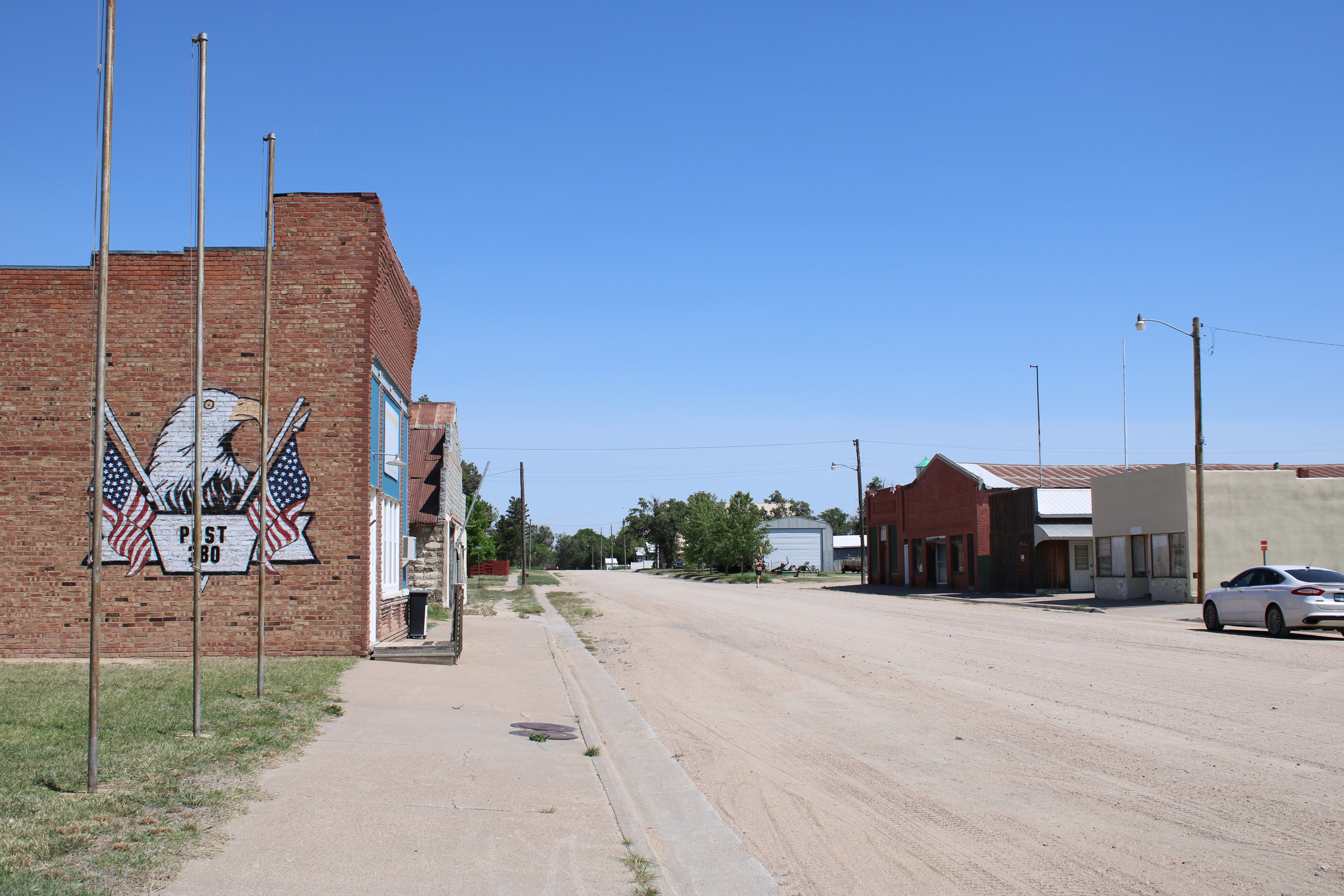
- Downtown Utica (2026)

- Location within Ness County and Kansas

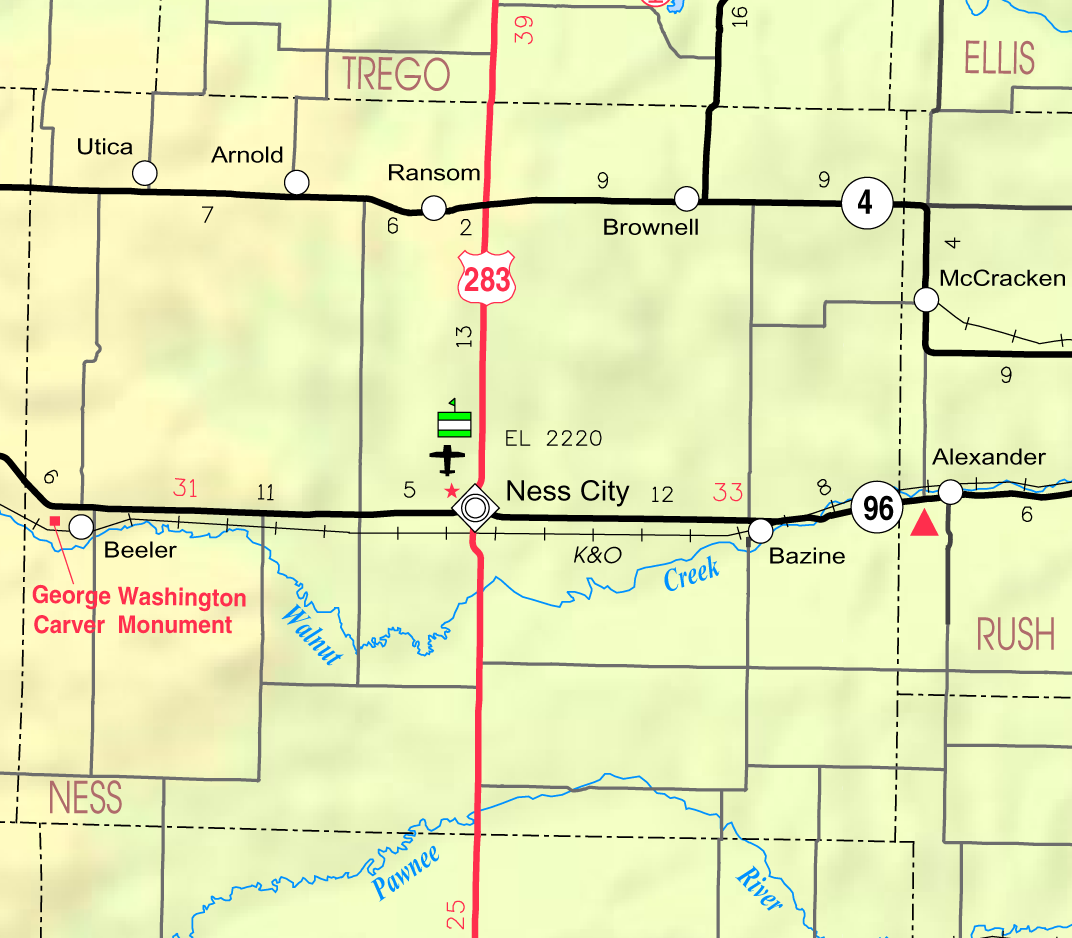
- KDOT map of Ness County (legend)
- Coordinates: 38°38′34″N 100°10′11″W
- Country: United States
- State: Kansas
- County: Ness
- Founded: 1870s
- Incorporated: 1911
- Named for: Utica, New York

Area
  - Total: 0.24 sq mi (0.63 km^{2})
  - Land: 0.24 sq mi (0.63 km^{2})
  - Water: 0 sq mi (0.00 km^{2})
- Elevation: 2,618 ft (798 m)

Population (2020)
  - Total: 99
  - Density: 410/sq mi (160/km^{2})
- Time zone: UTC-6 (CST)
  - Summer (DST): UTC-5 (CDT)
- ZIP Code: 67584
- Area code: 785
- FIPS code: 20-72650
- GNIS ID: 2397105

Utica is a city in Ness County, Kansas, United States. As of the 2020 census, the population of the city was 99.

== History ==
The first post office in Utica was established in 1879.

Utica was named by early pioneer C.W. Bell who was from Utica, New York.

== Geography ==
According to the United States Census Bureau, the city has a total area of 0.24 square miles (0.62 km^{2}), all land.

=== Climate ===
The climate in this area is characterized by hot, humid summers and generally mild to cool winters. According to the Köppen Climate Classification system, Utica has a humid subtropical climate, abbreviated "Cfa" on climate maps.

== Demographics ==
Historical population
Census	Pop.	Note	%±
1920	285		—
1930	382		34.0%
1940	379		−0.8%
1950	365		−3.7%
1960	322		−11.8%
1970	297		−7.8%
1980	275		−7.4%
1990	208		−24.4%
2000	223		7.2%
2010	158		−29.1%
2020	99		−37.3%
U.S. Decennial Census

=== 2010 census ===
As of the census of 2010, there were 158 people, 78 households, and 42 families residing in the city. The population density was 658.3 inhabitants per square mile (254.2/km^{2}). There were 102 housing units at an average density of 425.0 per square mile (164.1/km^{2}). The racial makeup of the city was 95.6% White, 0.6% African American, 0.6% Asian, 1.3% from other races, and 1.9% from two or more races. Hispanic or Latino of any race were 1.3% of the population.

There were 78 households, of which 24.4% had children under the age of 18 living with them, 42.3% were married couples living together, 9.0% had a female householder with no husband present, 2.6% had a male householder with no wife present, and 46.2% were non-families. 43.6% of all households were made up of individuals, and 20.5% had someone living alone who was 65 years of age or older. The average household size was 2.03 and the average family size was 2.76.

The median age in the city was 47.5 years. 20.9% of residents were under the age of 18; 8.9% were between the ages of 18 and 24; 18.5% were from 25 to 44; 26% were from 45 to 64; and 25.9% were 65 years of age or older. The gender makeup of the city was 46.2% male and 53.8% female.

=== 2000 census ===
As of the census of 2000, there were 223 people, 94 households, and 53 families residing in the city. The population density was 932.4 inhabitants per square mile (360.0/km^{2}). There were 104 housing units at an average density of 434.8 per square mile (167.9/km^{2}). The racial makeup of the city was 99.10% White, and 0.90% from two or more races. Hispanic or Latino of any race were 0.45% of the population.

There were 94 households, out of which 24.5% had children under the age of 18 living with them, 48.9% were married couples living together, 4.3% had a female householder with no husband present, and 42.6% were non-families. 39.4% of all households were made up of individuals, and 22.3% had someone living alone who was 65 years of age or older. The average household size was 2.37 and the average family size was 3.28.

In the city, the population was spread out, with 28.7% under the age of 18, 6.3% from 18 to 24, 23.8% from 25 to 44, 22.0% from 45 to 64, and 19.3% who were 65 years of age or older. The median age was 39 years. For every 100 females, there were 106.5 males. For every 100 females age 18 and over, there were 109.2 males.

The median income for a household in the city was $32,917, and the median income for a family was $36,875. Males had a median income of $27,000 versus $17,083 for females. The per capita income for the city was $15,508. About 13.1% of families and 21.2% of the population were below the poverty line, including 27.3% of those under the age of eighteen and 11.6% of those 65 or over.

== Education ==
The community is served by Western Plains USD 106 public school district. The Western Plains High School mascot is Bobcats.

Utica High School was closed in 2001. The school district never unified or consolidated with another. The Utica High School mascot was Utica Dragons. Utica Elementary closed in 2004.

== Gallery ==
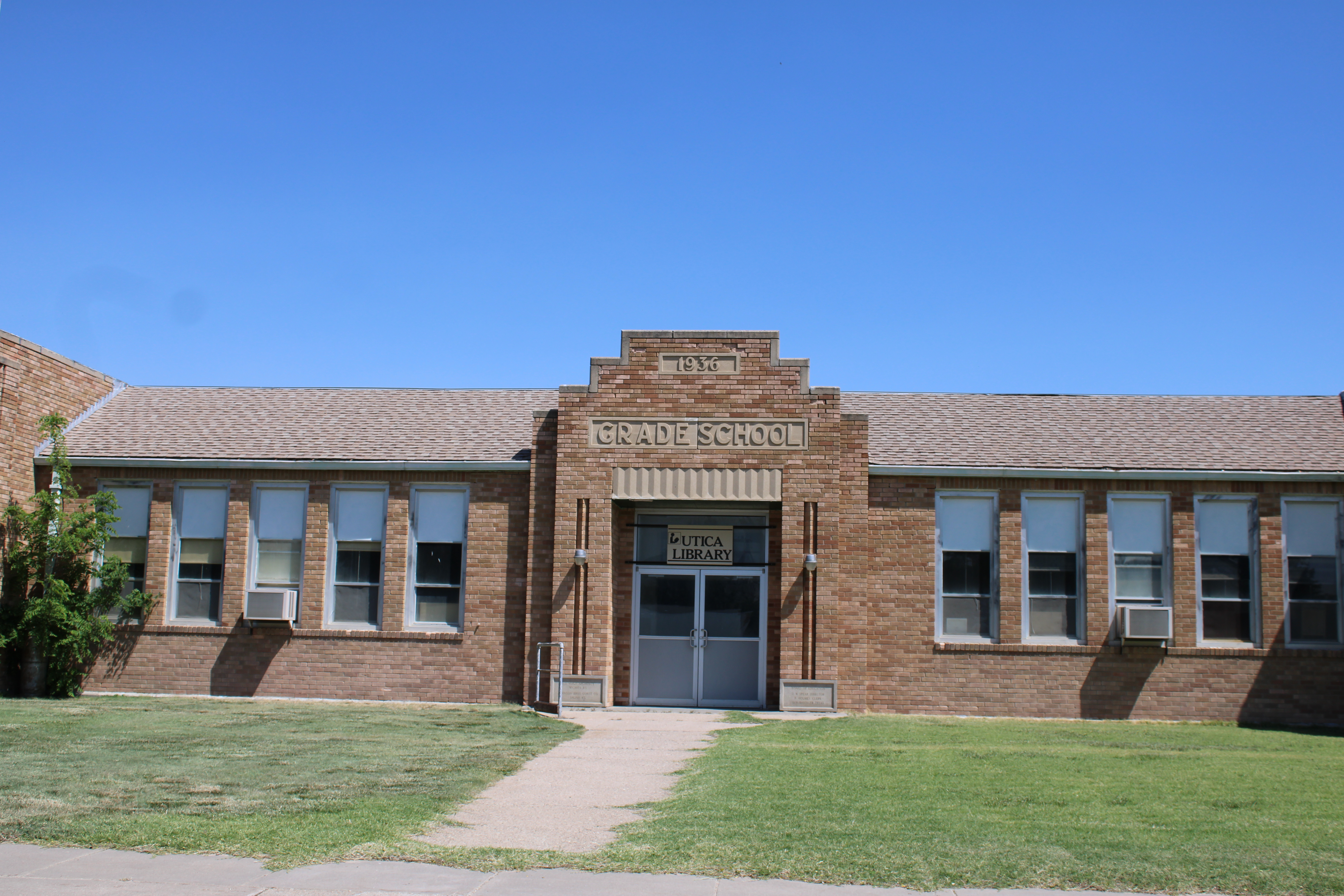
Old grade school

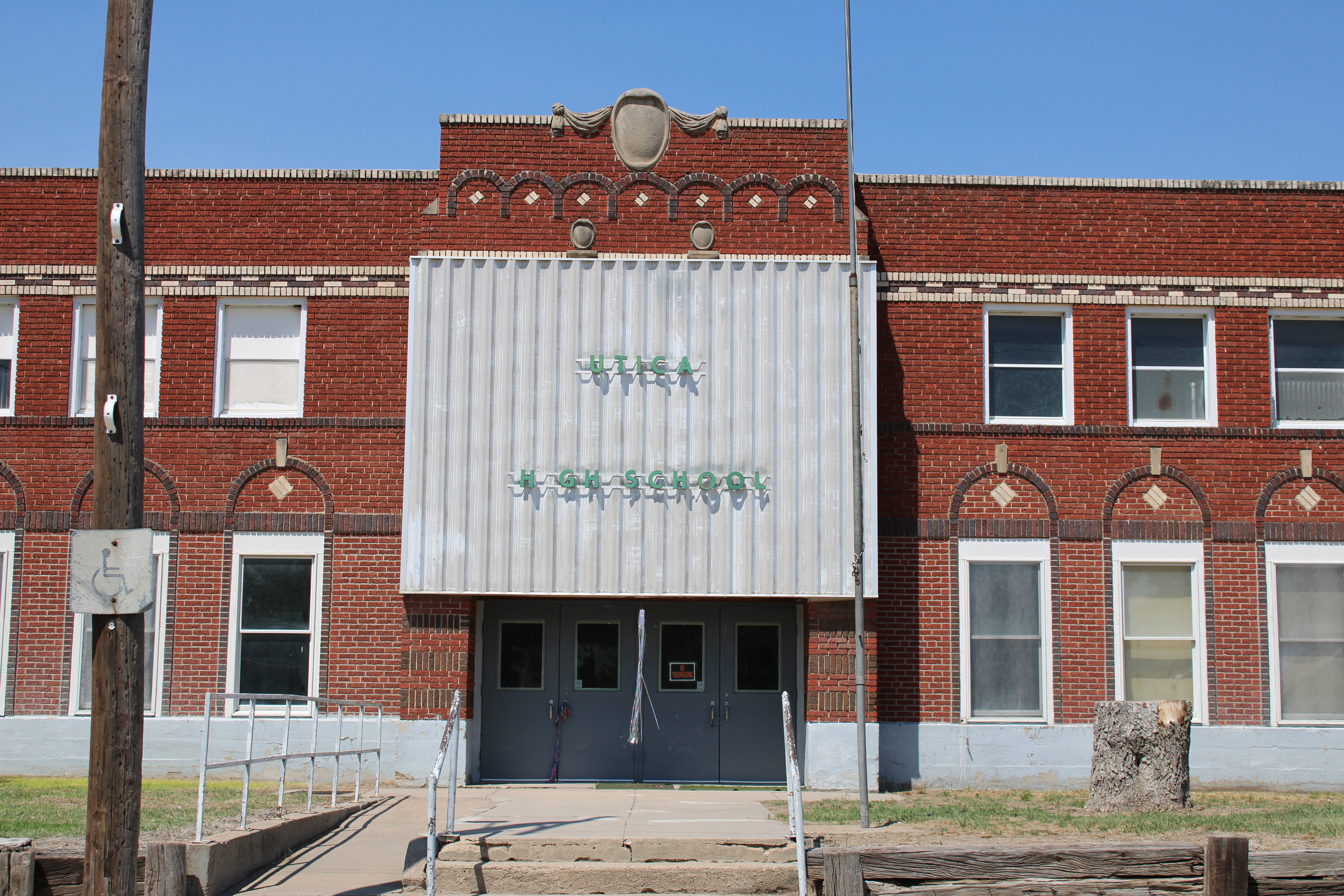
Old high school

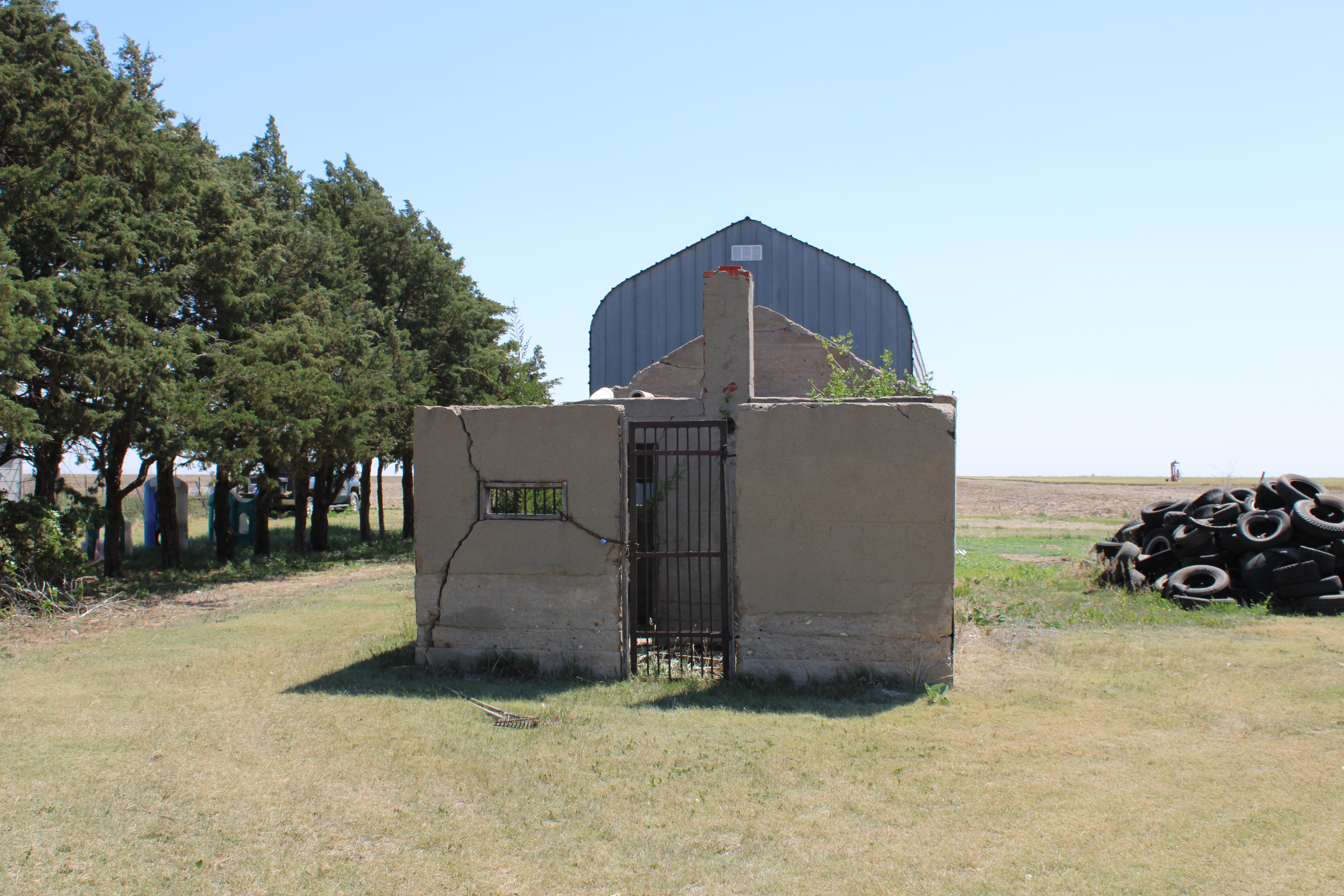
Old jail

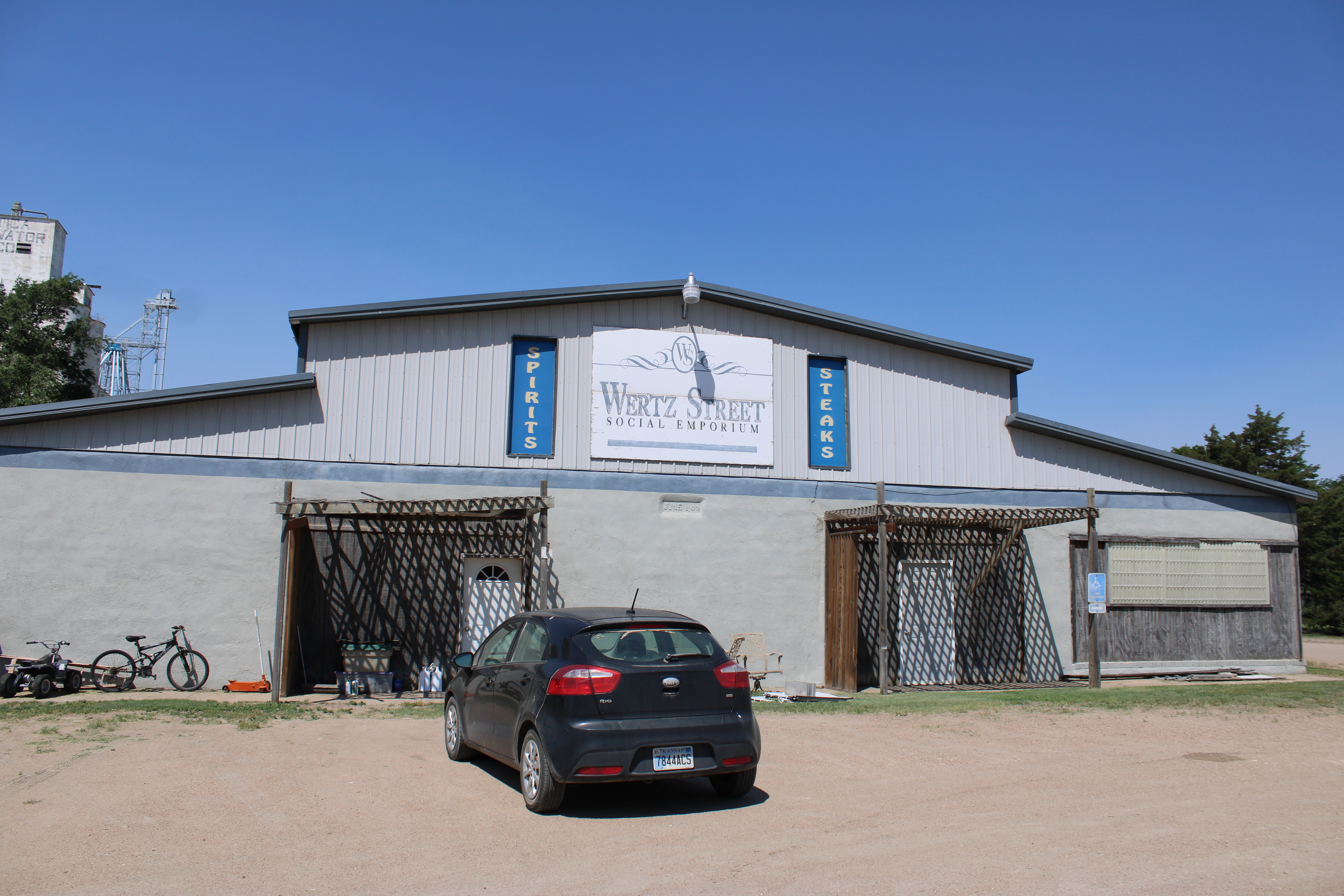
Social hall

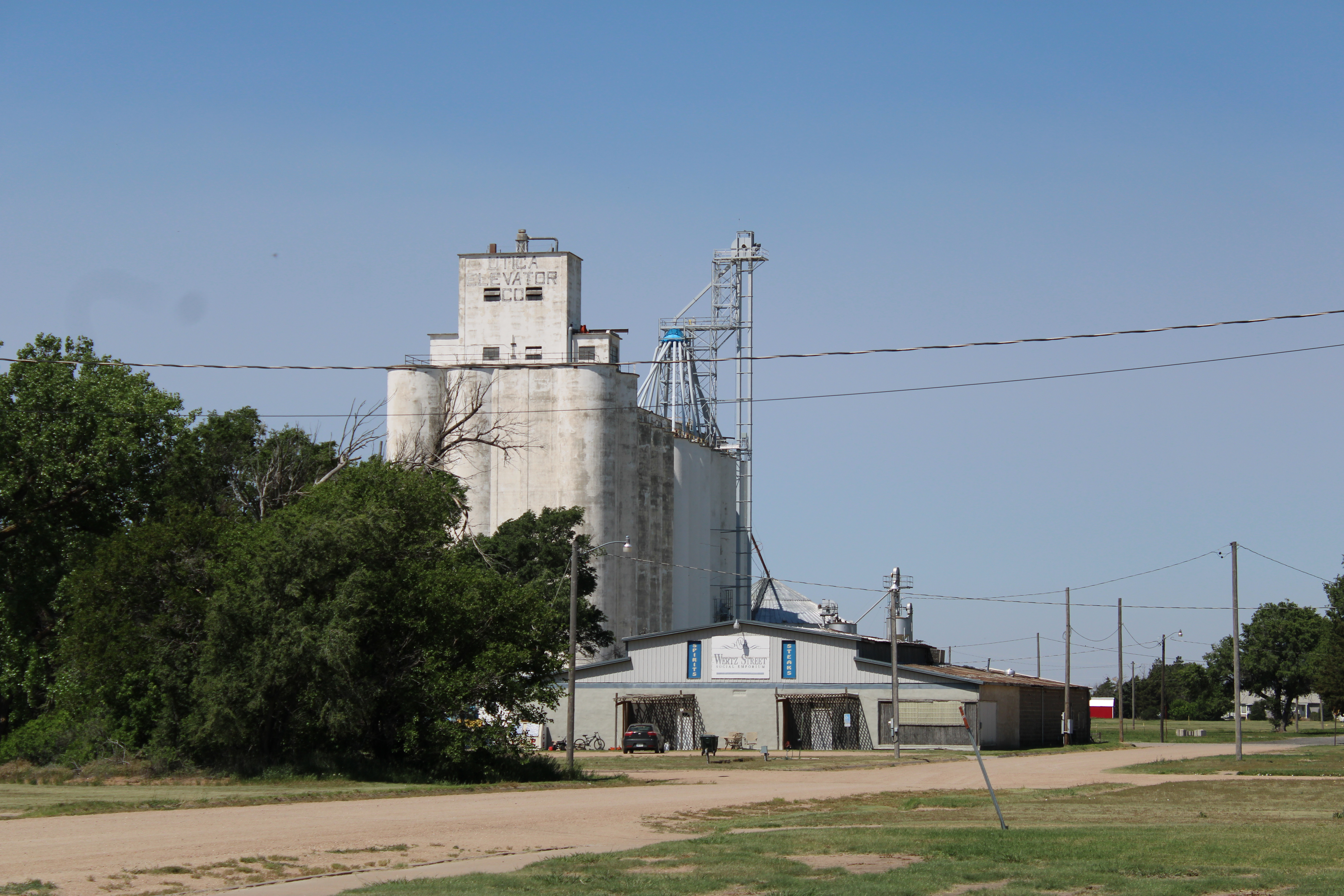
Grain elevator

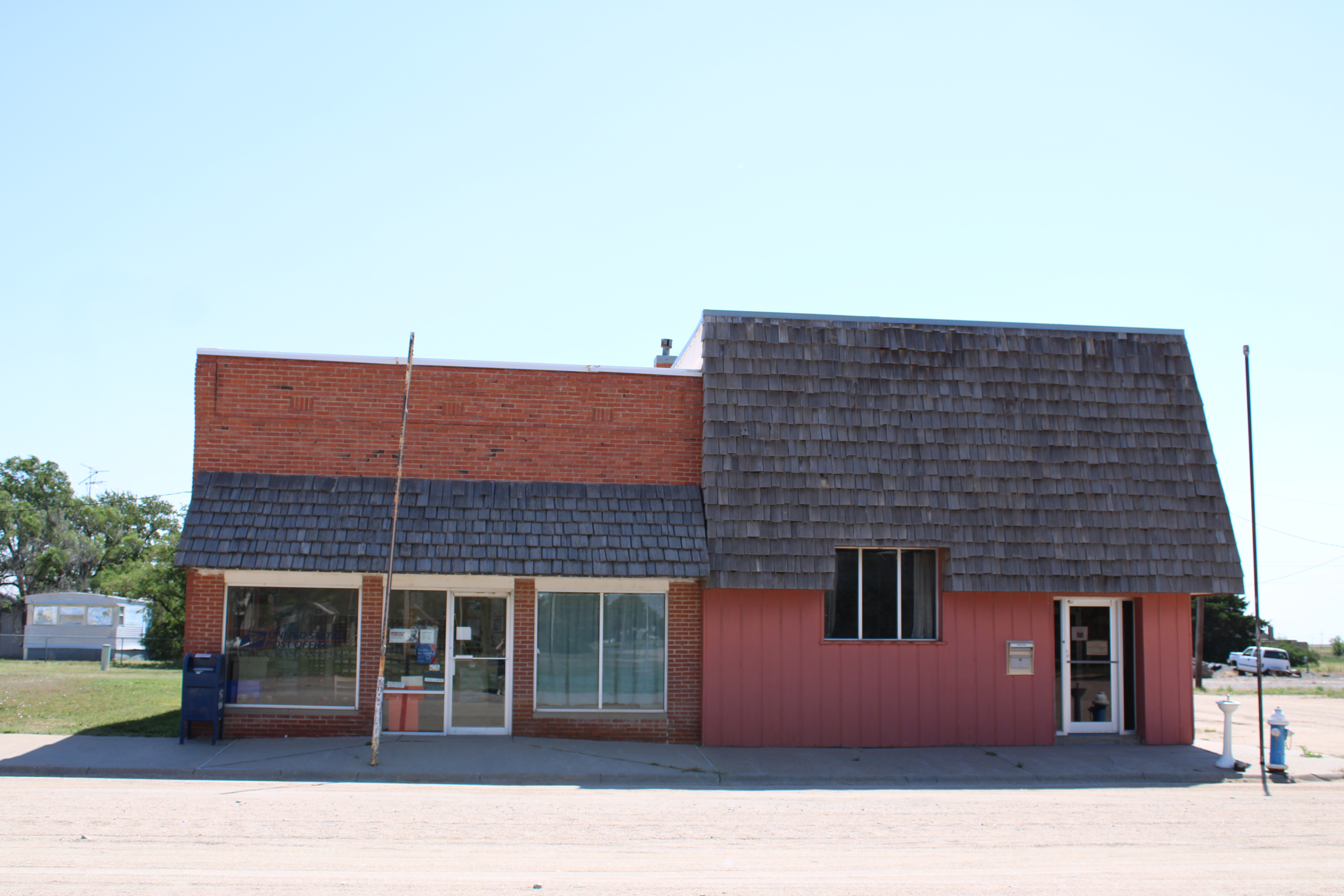
Post office

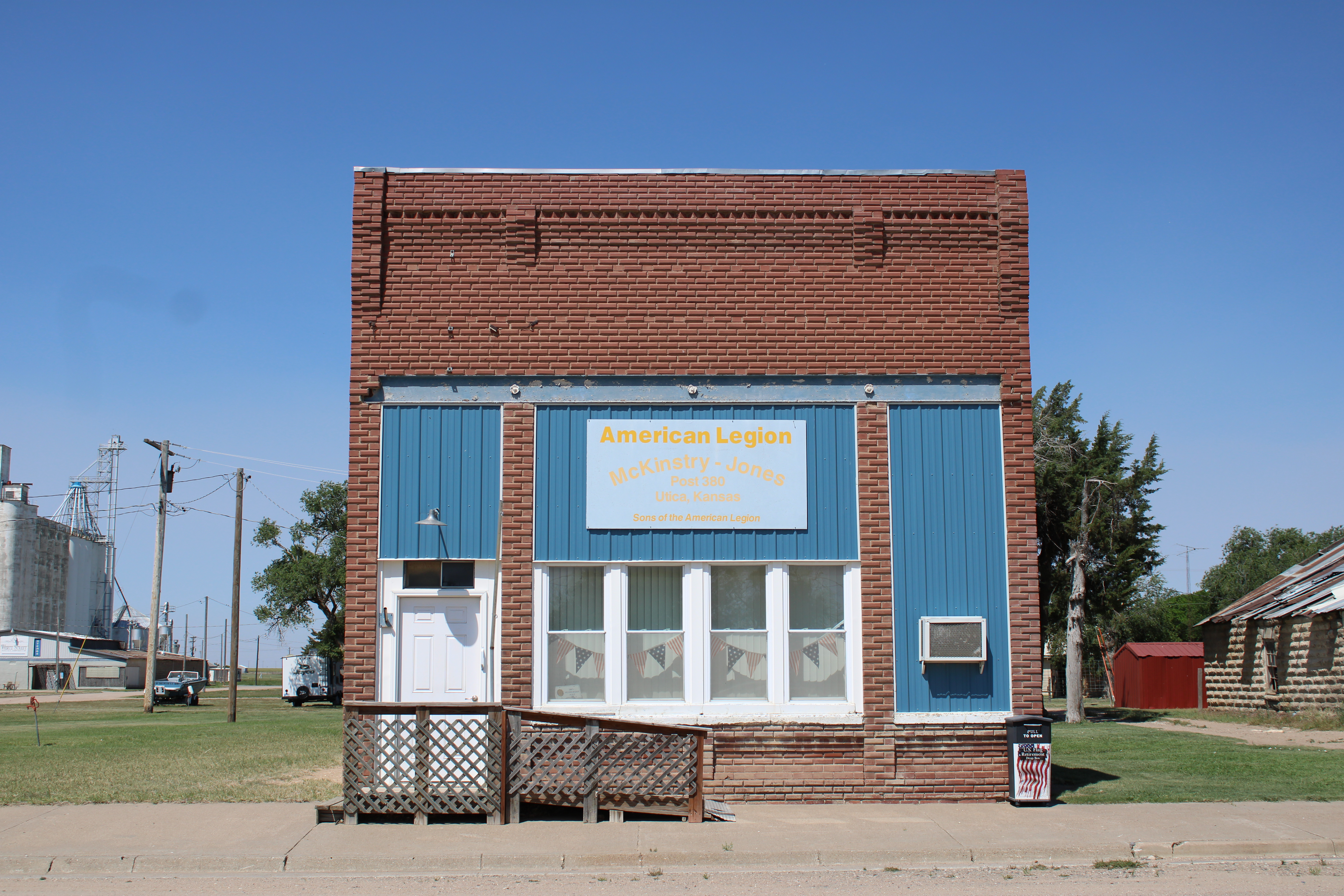
American Legion office
