= Ness County Bank =

- U.S. National Register of Historic Places
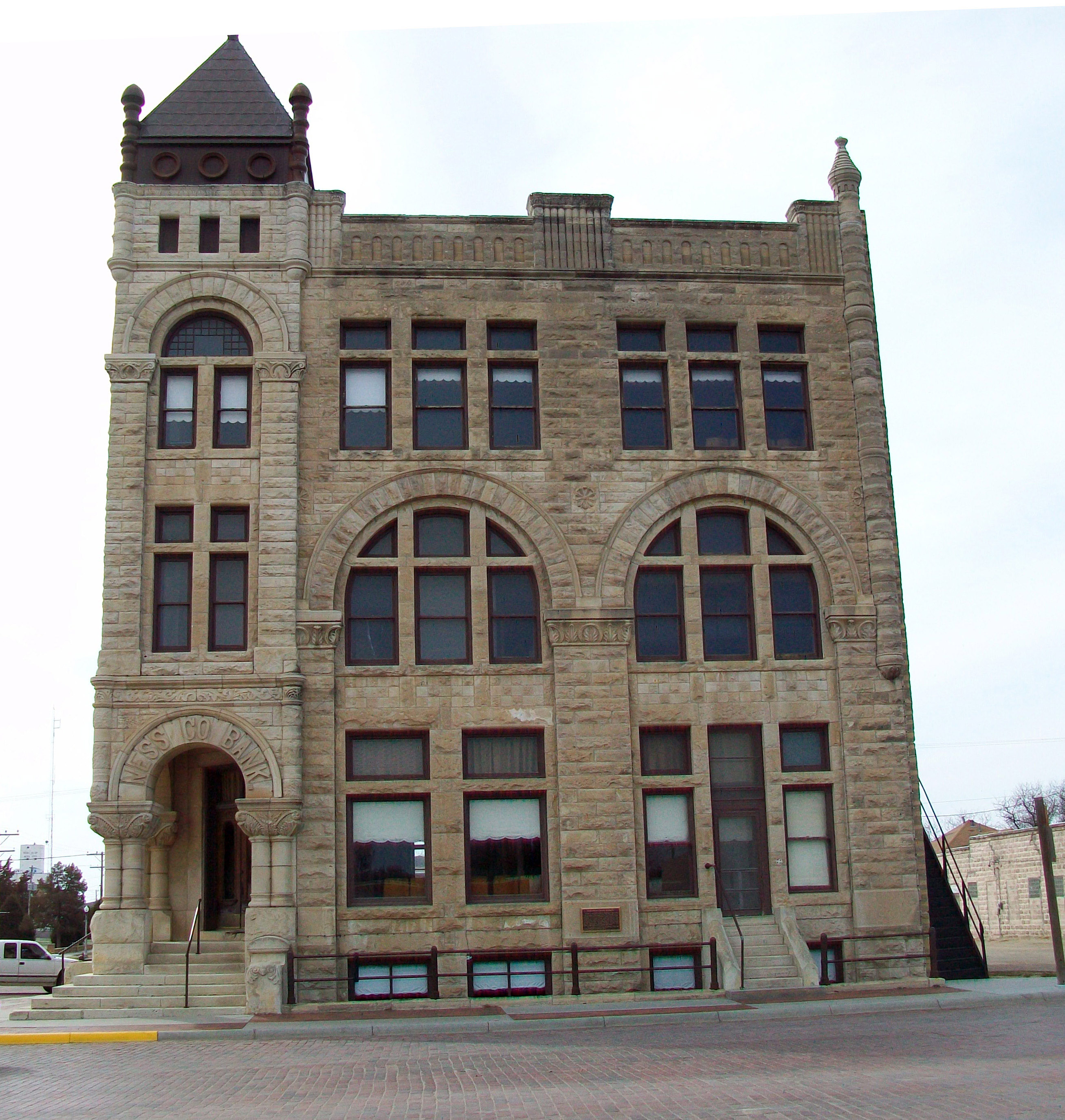

- Location within Kansas Location within the United States
- Location: Main St. and Pennsylvania Ave., Ness City, Kansas
- Coordinates: 38°27′15″N 99°54′19″W
- Area: 1 acre (0.40 ha)
- Built: 1888-1890
- Architect: Holland & Hopkins
- Architectural style: Romanesque
- NRHP reference No.: 72000519
- Added to NRHP: February 23, 1972

The Ness County Bank, located at Main Street and Pennsylvania Avenue in Ness City, Kansas, was built during 1888–1890. It was listed on the National Register of Historic Places in 1972.

It is a three-story stone building. It has been locally known as the "Skyscraper of the Plains" and has been asserted to be the most elegant building of West Central Kansas. Its architecture has aspects of Romanesque Revival style.
