= Beeler, Kansas =

Unincorporated community in Ness County, Kansas

- Unincorporated community
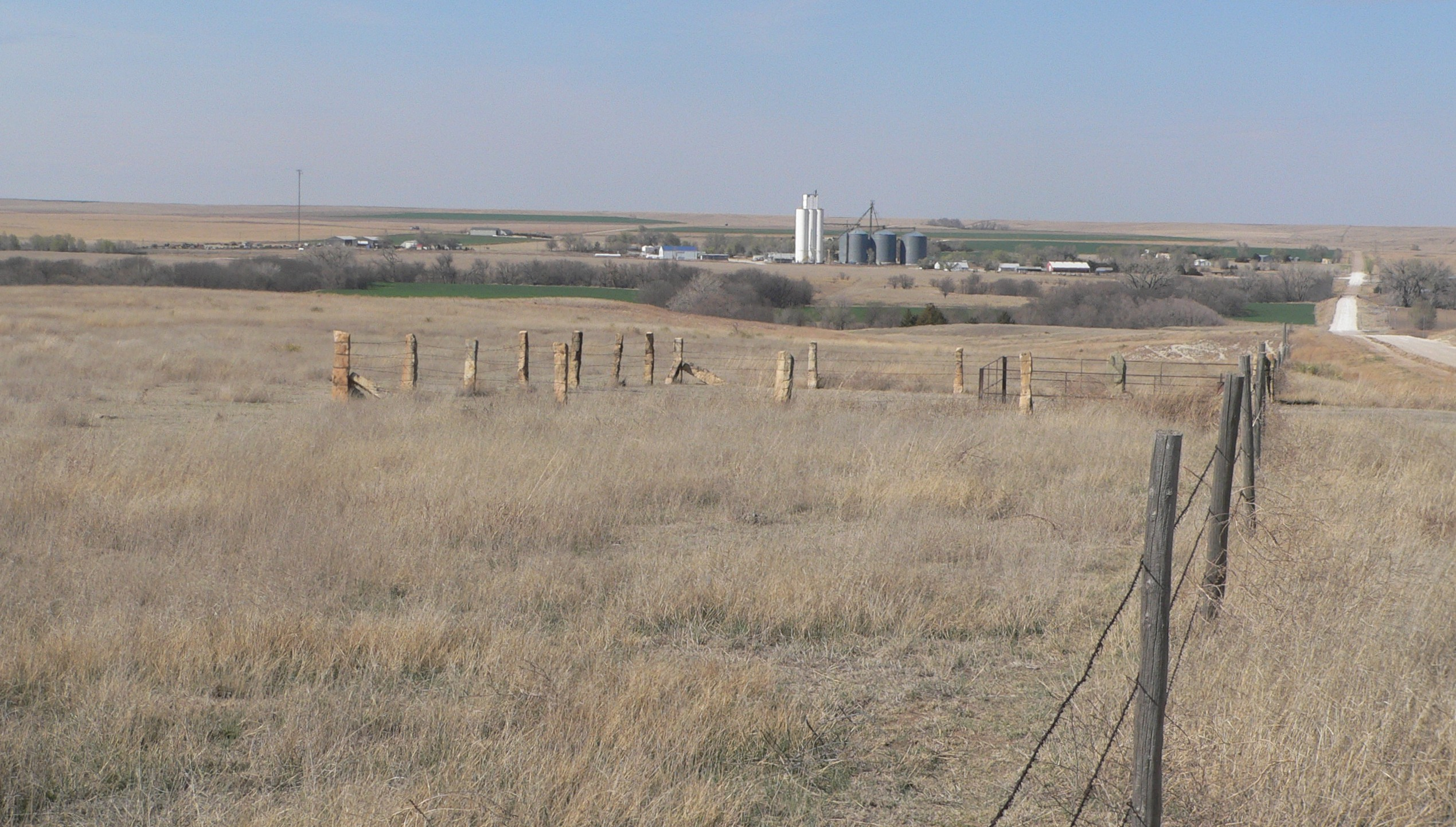
- George Washington Carver homestead site, south of Beeler (2015)

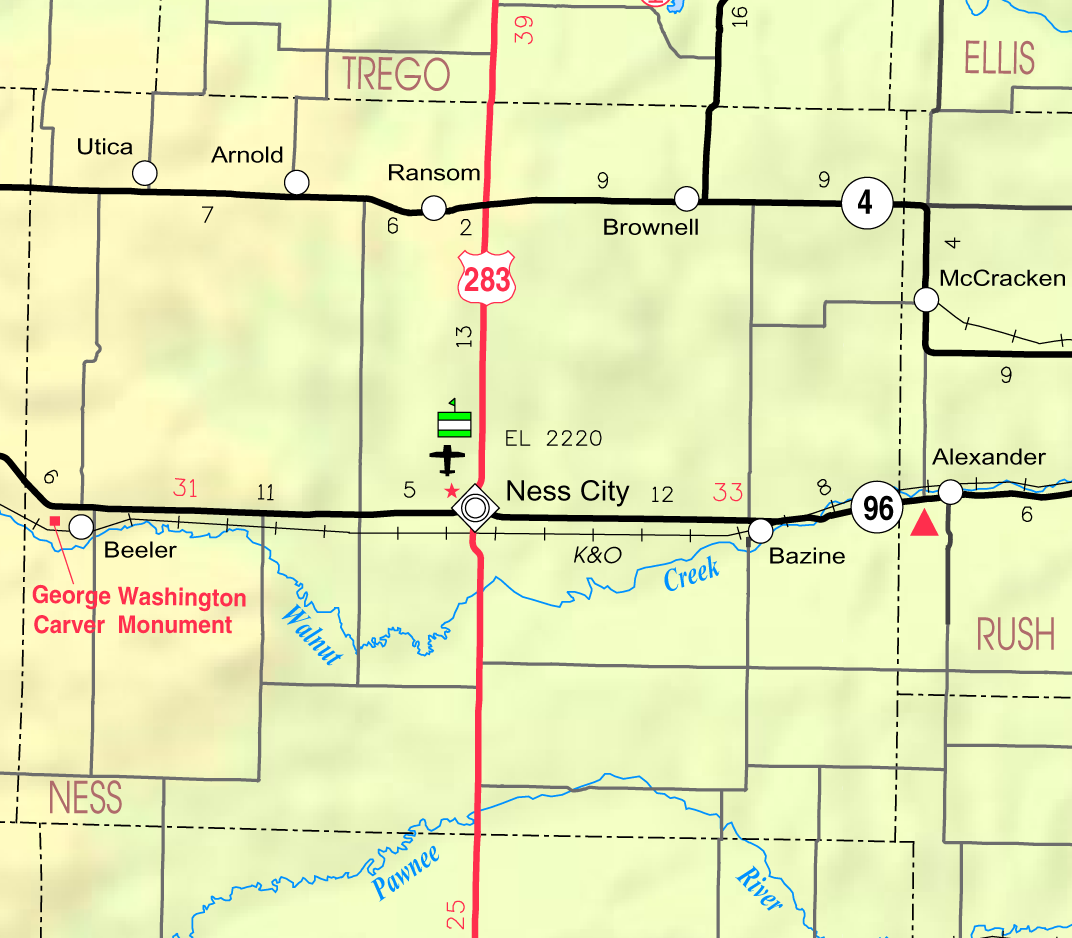
- KDOT map of Ness County (legend)

- Location within Kansas Location within the United States
- Coordinates: 38°26′40″N 100°11′41″W
- Country: United States
- State: Kansas
- County: Ness
- Named for: Elmer Beeler
- Elevation: 2,494 ft (760 m)
- Time zone: UTC-6 (CST)
  - Summer (DST): UTC-5 (CDT)
- ZIP Code: 67518
- Area code: 785
- FIPS code: 20-05300
- GNIS ID: 471523

Beeler is an unincorporated community in Ness County, Kansas, United States. It lies along K-96, west of the city of Ness City, the county seat of Ness County. It has a ZIP Code of 67518.

== History ==
Beeler was a station and shipping point on the Atchison, Topeka and Santa Fe Railway. Elmer Beeler, the town's founder, is its namesake.

The first post office in Beeler was established in 1886 as Beelerville. The post office was discontinued in 2009.

== Geography ==
=== Climate ===
The climate in this area is characterized by hot, humid summers and generally mild to cool winters. According to the Köppen Climate Classification system, Beeler has a humid subtropical climate, abbreviated "Cfa" on climate maps.
