= Indian Creek Village, Maryland =

Coordinates: 39°2′1.47″N 76°53′55.31″W

Indian Creek Village is a subdivision in Beltsville, Maryland, located adjacent to Edmonston Road and north of Powder Mill Road. Located just to the north is Muirkirk. It is immediately west of the Beltsville Agricultural Research Center, north of the Birmingham Masonic Lodge, and east of undeveloped land adjacent to Indian Creek, a tributary of the Anacostia River. The subdivision features several short streets, including: Lime Tree Way, Hockberry Way, Cody Court, Indian Creek Street, Moonlight Court, Twain Court, Figtree Court, Hammett Street, and Alcott Court.

The land was acquired from the estate of Anna L. Stewart, deceased in December 1973. On August 19, 1985, the Development Group of Laurel, Maryland, incorporated the Indian Creek Village Homeowners Association to provide for maintenance, preservation, and architectural control of the residential lots and common areas. The homeowners association has five board members, and contracts for management and maintenance functions.

The community includes 90 townhouse-style duplexes and undeveloped land, administratively divided into Sections A, B, and C. Section A was developed first.

== Sources ==
- "Articles of Incorporation". Indian Creek Village Homeowners Association, Inc. August 2, 1985.
- Indian Creek Village Yahoo! Group
