= Indian Village Historic District (Fort Wayne, Indiana) =

Historic district in Indiana, United States

- U.S. National Register of Historic Places
- U.S. Historic district
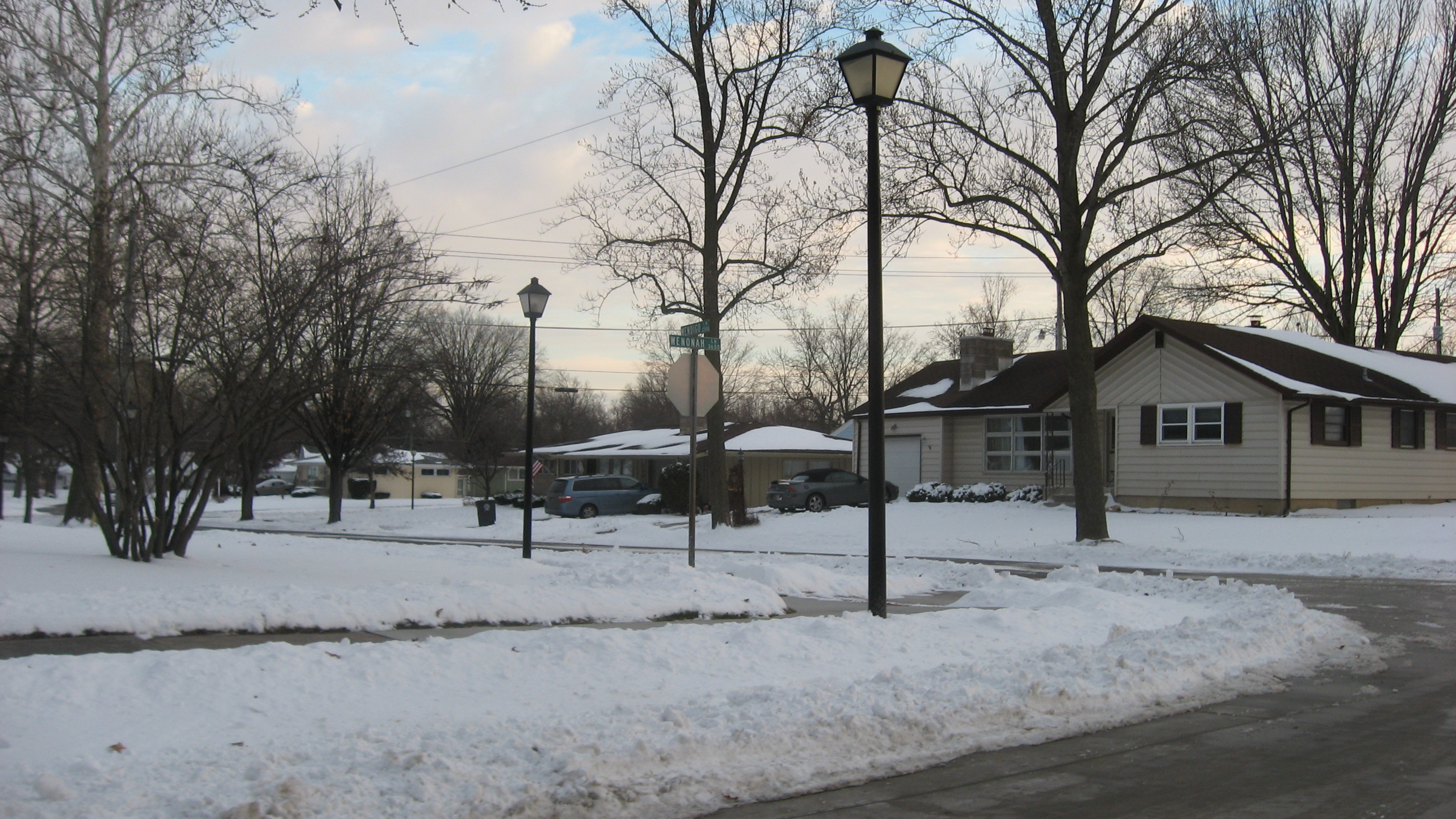
- Houses on Wendigo Lane near Wenonah Lane

- Location within Indiana Location within the United States
- Location: Roughly bounded by Nuttman Ave on the N., Bluffton Rd. on E., Engle Rd. on S., Norfolk Southern ROW on W., Fort Wayne, Indiana
- Coordinates: 41°02′54″N 85°10′21″W
- Area: 150 acres (61 ha)
- Architect: Sheridan, Lawrence V.; Worthman, John R.
- Architectural style: Late 19th And 20th Century Revivals, Modern Movement
- MPS: Park and Boulevard System of Fort Wayne, Indiana MPS
- NRHP reference No.: 09001125
- Added to NRHP: December 22, 2009

The Indian Village Historic District is a national historic district located at Fort Wayne, Indiana. The district encompasses 481 contributing buildings, 2 contributing sites, 1 contributing structure, and 6 contributing objects in a predominantly residential section of Fort Wayne. The area was developed from about 1925 to 1960, and includes notable examples of Tudor Revival, Mission Revival, and Modern Movement style residential architecture.

It was listed on the National Register of Historic Places in 2009.
