= Ransom, Kansas =

City in Ness County, Kansas, United States

- City
- Location within Ness County and Kansas

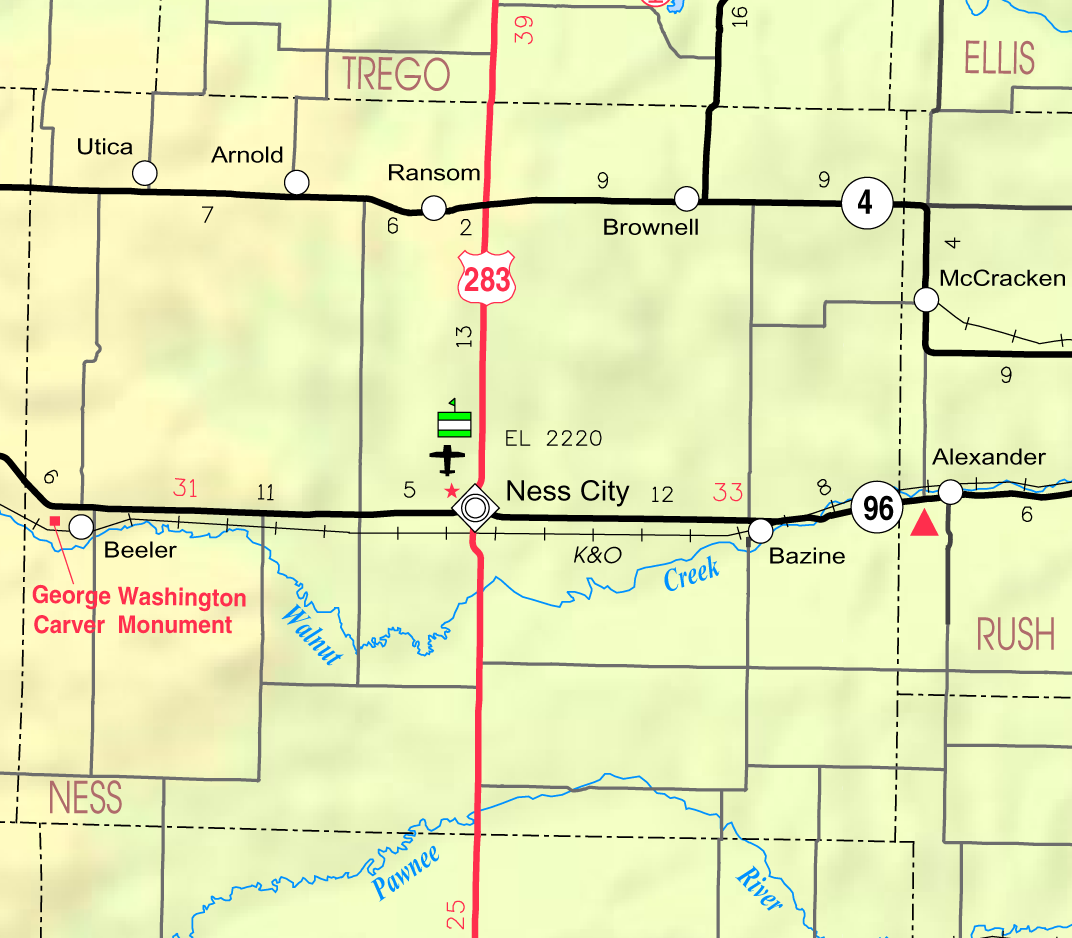
- KDOT map of Ness County (legend)
- Coordinates: 38°38′11″N 99°55′58″W
- Country: United States
- State: Kansas
- County: Ness
- Founded: 1880s
- Incorporated: 1905
- Named for: Thomas Ransom

Area
  - Total: 0.35 sq mi (0.91 km^{2})
  - Land: 0.35 sq mi (0.91 km^{2})
  - Water: 0 sq mi (0.00 km^{2})
- Elevation: 2,517 ft (767 m)

Population (2020)
  - Total: 260
  - Density: 740/sq mi (290/km^{2})
- Time zone: UTC-6 (CST)
  - Summer (DST): UTC-5 (CDT)
- ZIP Code: 67572
- Area code: 785
- FIPS code: 20-58500
- GNIS ID: 2396321
- Website: cityofransomks.gov

Ransom is a city in Ness County, Kansas, United States. As of the 2020 census, the population of the city was 260.

== History ==
Ransom is the namesake of Thomas E. G. Ransom.

The first post office in Ransom was established in 1887, but it was called Ogdensburgh until 1888.

Ransom was incorporated as a city in 1905.

== Geography ==
According to the United States Census Bureau, the city has a total area of 0.32 square miles (0.83 km^{2}), all land.

=== Climate ===
The climate in this area is characterized by hot, humid summers and generally mild to cool winters. According to the Köppen Climate Classification system, Ransom has a humid subtropical climate, abbreviated "Cfa" on climate maps.

== Demographics ==
Historical population
Census	Pop.	Note	%±
1910	204		—
1920	285		39.7%
1930	431		51.2%
1940	403		−6.5%
1950	405		0.5%
1960	387		−4.4%
1970	416		7.5%
1980	448		7.7%
1990	386		−13.8%
2000	338		−12.4%
2010	294		−13.0%
2020	260		−11.6%
U.S. Decennial Census

=== 2020 census ===
The 2020 United States census counted 260 people, 117 households, and 57 families in Ransom. The population density was 740.7 per square mile (286.0/km^{2}). There were 160 housing units at an average density of 455.8 per square mile (176.0/km^{2}). The racial makeup was 96.15% (250) white or European American (95.38% non-Hispanic white), 0.0% (0) black or African-American, 0.0% (0) Native American or Alaska Native, 0.77% (2) Asian, 0.38% (1) Pacific Islander or Native Hawaiian, 0.0% (0) from other races, and 2.69% (7) from two or more races. Hispanic or Latino of any race was 2.69% (7) of the population.

Of the 117 households, 14.5% had children under the age of 18; 42.7% were married couples living together; 34.2% had a female householder with no spouse or partner present. 49.6% of households consisted of individuals and 21.4% had someone living alone who was 65 years of age or older. The average household size was 2.0 and the average family size was 2.8. The percent of those with a bachelor's degree or higher was estimated to be 10.8% of the population.

14.6% of the population was under the age of 18, 4.2% from 18 to 24, 16.5% from 25 to 44, 29.2% from 45 to 64, and 35.4% who were 65 years of age or older. The median age was 58.4 years. For every 100 females, there were 126.1 males. For every 100 females ages 18 and older, there were 136.2 males.

The 2016–2020 5-year American Community Survey estimates show that the median household income was $50,208 (with a margin of error of +/- $10,913) and the median family income was $58,833 (+/- $5,563). Males had a median income of $44,750 (+/- $11,454) versus $21,042 (+/- $5,471) for females. The median income for those above 16 years old was $26,477 (+/- $7,438). Approximately, 2.2% of families and 3.4% of the population were below the poverty line, including 0.0% of those under the age of 18 and 9.0% of those ages 65 or over.

=== 2010 census ===
As of the census of 2010, there were 294 people, 129 households, and 80 families residing in the city. The population density was 918.8 inhabitants per square mile (354.8/km^{2}). There were 178 housing units at an average density of 556.3 per square mile (214.8/km^{2}). The racial makeup of the city was 99.3% White and 0.7% from two or more races. Hispanic or Latino of any race were 0.7% of the population.

There were 129 households, of which 24.8% had children under the age of 18 living with them, 51.2% were married couples living together, 7.0% had a female householder with no husband present, 3.9% had a male householder with no wife present, and 38.0% were non-families. 36.4% of all households were made up of individuals, and 22.5% had someone living alone who was 65 years of age or older. The average household size was 2.08 and the average family size was 2.68.

The median age in the city was 52.7 years. 19.4% of residents were under the age of 18; 3% were between the ages of 18 and 24; 16.1% were from 25 to 44; 25.8% were from 45 to 64; and 35.7% were 65 years of age or older. The gender makeup of the city was 46.9% male and 53.1% female.

== Education ==
=== Public ===
The community is served by Western Plains USD 106 public school district. The Western Plains High School mascot is Bobcats.

Ransom High School was closed through school unification. The Ransom Longhorns won the Kansas State High School boys class 1A Track & Field championship in 1972 and 1999. USD 106 formed in 2004 by the consolidation of Ransom USD 302 and Bazine USD 304.

=== Library ===
Ransom is served by the Ransom Public Library.

== Notable people ==
- Nolan Cromwell, NFL coach and former player. Ransom High class of 1973
- Ruth Riley, professional basketball player
