= Collyer, Kansas =

City in Trego County, Kansas, United States

Collyer
- City
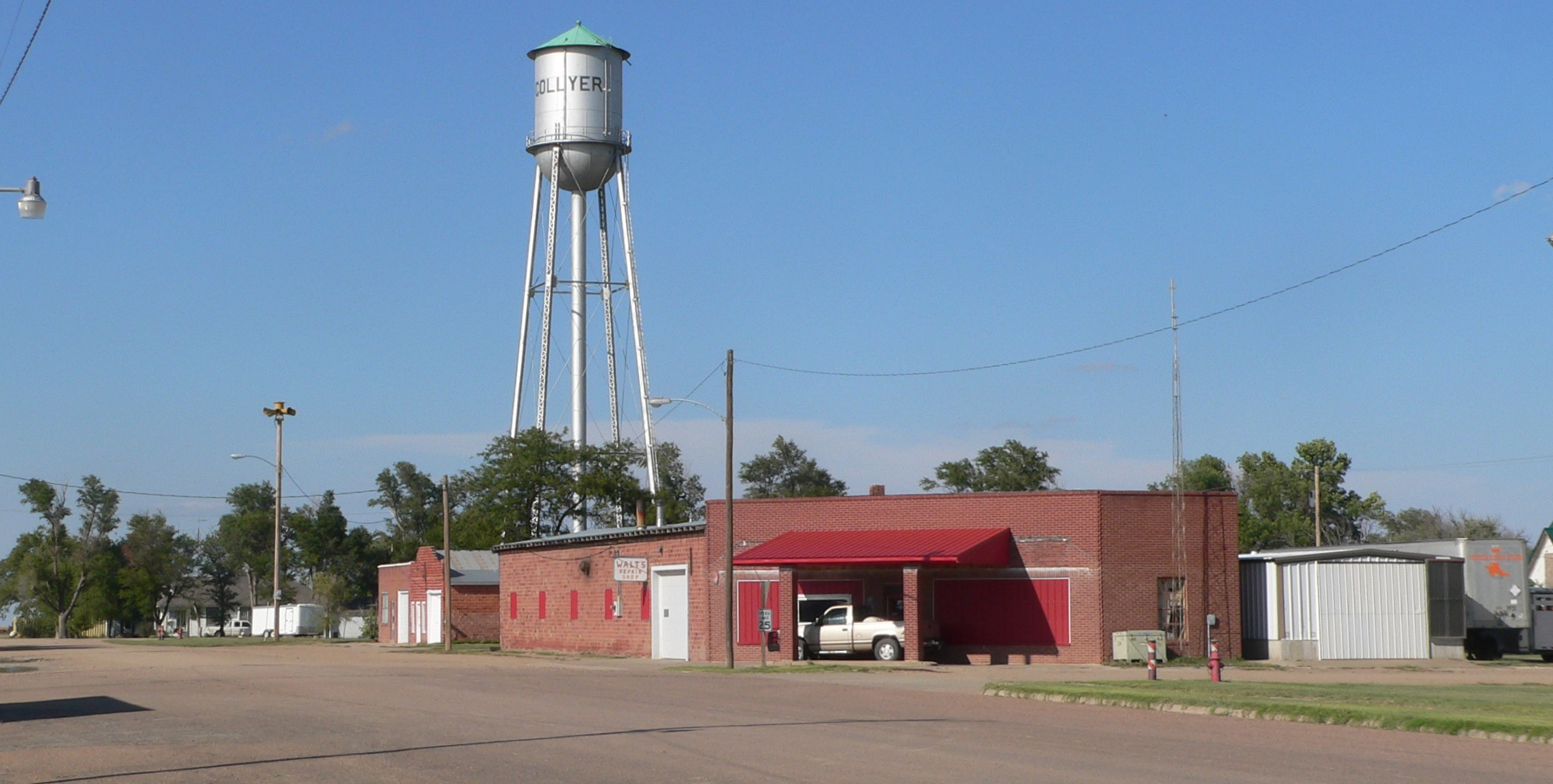
- Downtown Collyer (2014)

- Location within Trego County and Kansas

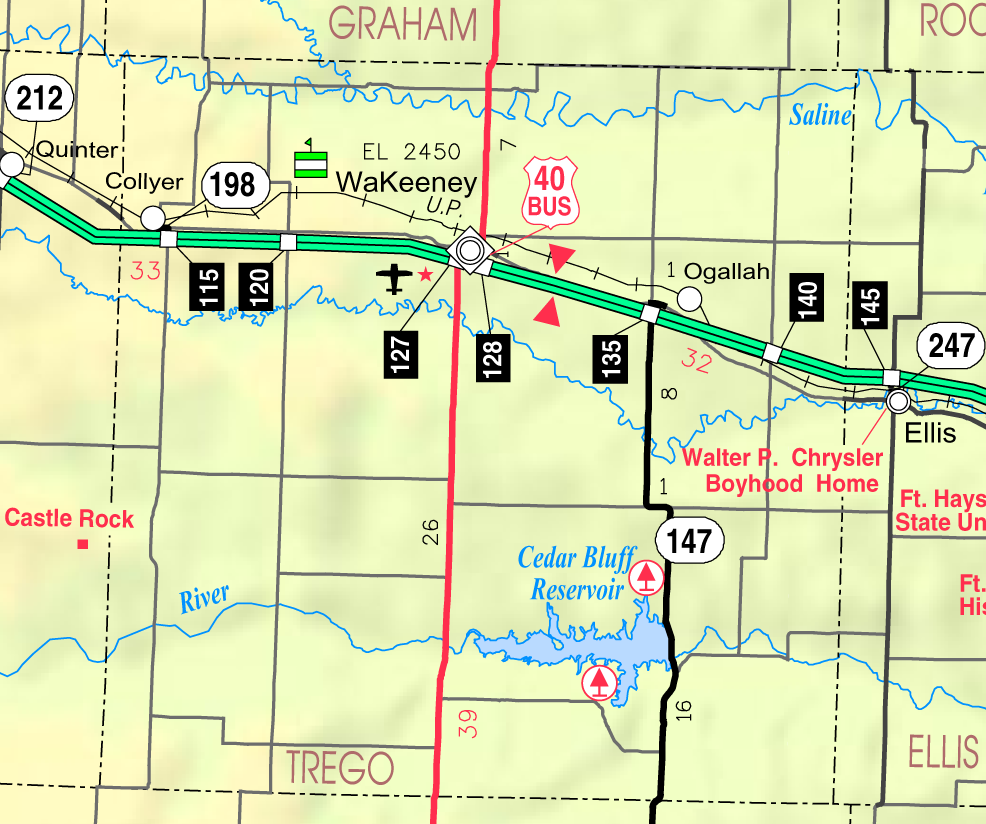
- KDOT map of Trego County (legend)
- Coordinates: 39°2′8″N 100°7′4″W
- Country: United States
- State: Kansas
- County: Trego
- Founded: 1879
- Incorporated: 1917
- Named for: Robert Collyer

Area
  - Total: 0.24 sq mi (0.61 km^{2})
  - Land: 0.24 sq mi (0.61 km^{2})
  - Water: 0 sq mi (0.00 km^{2})
- Elevation: 2,582 ft (787 m)

Population (2020)
  - Total: 97
  - Density: 410/sq mi (160/km^{2})
- Time zone: UTC-6 (CST)
  - Summer (DST): UTC-5 (CDT)
- ZIP Code: 67631
- Area code: 785
- FIPS code: 20-14900
- GNIS ID: 471355
- Website: City website

Collyer is a city in Trego County, Kansas, United States. As of the 2020 census, the population of the city was 97. It is located approximately 12 miles west of WaKeeney.

== History ==
The first settlement was made at Collyer in 1879. Collyer was named for Rev. Robert Collyer.

== Geography ==
Collyer is located at 39°2′13″N 100°7′3″W (39.036947, -100.117451). According to the United States Census Bureau, the city has a total area of 0.25 square miles (0.65 km^{2}), all land.

=== Climate ===
The climate in this area is characterized by hot, humid summers and generally mild to cool winters. According to the Köppen Climate Classification system, Collyer has a humid subtropical climate, abbreviated "Cfa" on climate maps.

== Demographics ==
Historical population
Census	Pop.	Note	%±
1920	190		—
1930	243		27.9%
1940	268		10.3%
1950	282		5.2%
1960	233		−17.4%
1970	182		−21.9%
1980	151		−17.0%
1990	144		−4.6%
2000	133		−7.6%
2010	109		−18.0%
2020	97		−11.0%
U.S. Decennial Census

=== 2020 census ===
The 2020 United States census counted 97 people, 45 households, and 31 families in Collyer. The population density was 414.5 per square mile (160.1/km^{2}). There were 60 housing units at an average density of 256.4 per square mile (99.0/km^{2}). The racial makeup was 93.81% (91) white or European American (90.72% non-Hispanic white), 1.03% (1) black or African-American, 1.03% (1) Native American or Alaska Native, 0.0% (0) Asian, 0.0% (0) Pacific Islander or Native Hawaiian, 0.0% (0) from other races, and 4.12% (4) from two or more races. Hispanic or Latino of any race was 5.15% (5) of the population.

Of the 45 households, 31.1% had children under the age of 18; 53.3% were married couples living together; 17.8% had a female householder with no spouse or partner present. 26.7% of households consisted of individuals and 13.3% had someone living alone who was 65 years of age or older. The average household size was 2.2 and the average family size was 2.5. The percent of those with a bachelor's degree or higher was estimated to be 7.2% of the population.

19.6% of the population was under the age of 18, 16.5% from 18 to 24, 16.5% from 25 to 44, 28.9% from 45 to 64, and 18.6% who were 65 years of age or older. The median age was 39.8 years. For every 100 females, there were 98.0 males. For every 100 females ages 18 and older, there were 81.4 males.

The 2016–2020 5-year American Community Survey estimates show that the median household income was $43,750 (with a margin of error of +/- $20,687). The median income for those above 16 years old was $31,000 (+/- $6,105). Approximately, 4.0% of families and 10.1% of the population were below the poverty line, including 0.0% of those under the age of 18 and 16.7% of those ages 65 or over.

=== 2010 census ===
As of the census of 2010, there were 109 people, 49 households, and 34 families residing in the city. The population density was 436.0 inhabitants per square mile (168.3/km^{2}). There were 77 housing units at an average density of 308.0 per square mile (118.9/km^{2}). The racial makeup of the city was 100.0% White. Hispanic or Latino of any race were 0.9% of the population.

There were 49 households, of which 16.3% had children under the age of 18 living with them, 55.1% were married couples living together, 8.2% had a female householder with no husband present, 6.1% had a male householder with no wife present, and 30.6% were non-families. 26.5% of all households were made up of individuals, and 12.2% had someone living alone who was 65 years of age or older. The average household size was 2.22 and the average family size was 2.71.

The median age in the city was 47.8 years. 12.8% of residents were under the age of 18; 12.8% were between the ages of 18 and 24; 20.1% were from 25 to 44; 32.1% were from 45 to 64; and 22% were 65 years of age or older. The gender makeup of the city was 53.2% male and 46.8% female.

== Education ==
Collyer High School closed in 1966. The Collyer High School mascot was Collyer Wildcats.
