= Ness City, Kansas =

City in Ness County, Kansas

- City and county seat
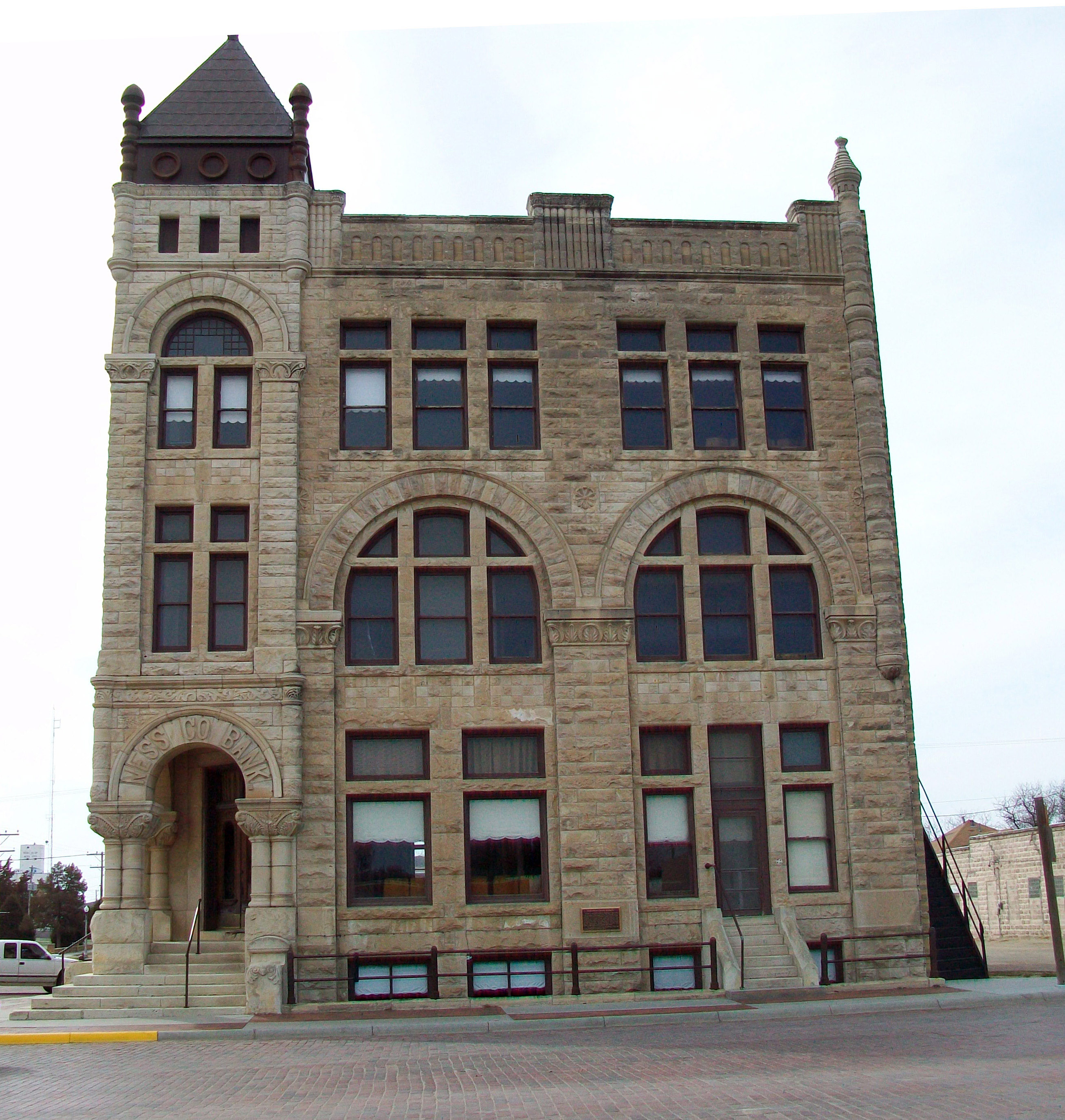
- Ness County Bank building (2013)

- Location within Ness County and Kansas

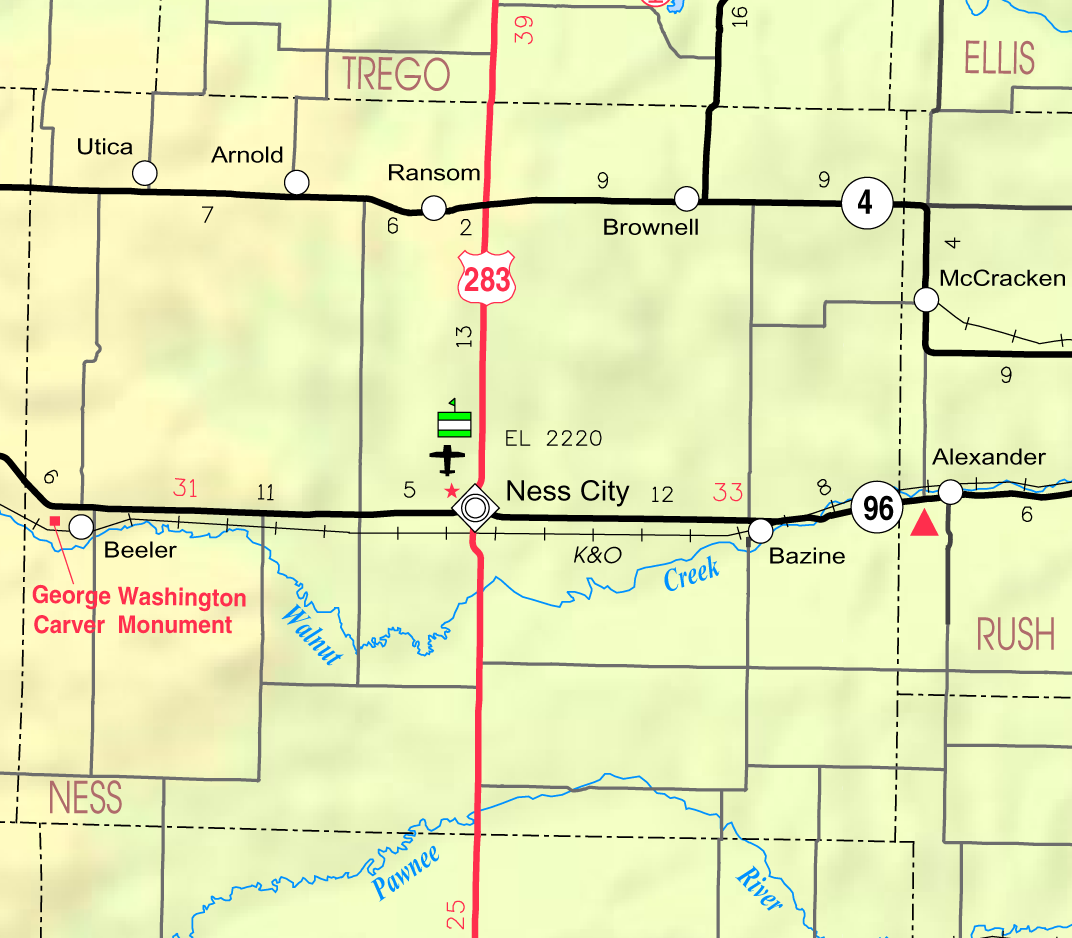
- KDOT map of Ness County (legend)
- Coordinates: 38°27′15″N 99°54′17″W
- Country: United States
- State: Kansas
- County: Ness
- Founded: 1878
- Incorporated: 1886
- Named for: Corporal Noah Ness

Area
  - Total: 1.46 sq mi (3.77 km^{2})
  - Land: 1.46 sq mi (3.77 km^{2})
  - Water: 0 sq mi (0.00 km^{2})
- Elevation: 2,261 ft (689 m)

Population (2020)
  - Total: 1,329
  - Density: 913/sq mi (353/km^{2})
- Time zone: UTC-6 (CST)
  - Summer (DST): UTC-5 (CDT)
- ZIP Code: 67560
- Area code: 785
- FIPS code: 20-49925
- GNIS ID: 2395176
- Website: City website

Ness City is a city in and the county seat of Ness County, Kansas, United States. As of the 2020 census, the population of the city was 1,329. Ness City is famous for its four-story Old Ness County Bank Building located downtown and nicknamed Skyscraper of the Plains.

== History ==
Ness City was founded in 1878. The town experienced growth with the arrival of the railroad in 1886.

== Geography ==
According to the United States Census Bureau, the city has a total area of 1.02 square miles (2.64 km^{2}), all land.

=== Climate ===
Ness City has a humid subtropical climate (Köppen Cwa), with hot, humid summers and cold, dry winters. On average, January is the coldest and driest month, and July is both the hottest month and the wettest month.

Climate data for Ness City, Kansas, 1991–2020 normals, extremes 1893–2021
| Month | Jan | Feb | Mar | Apr | May | Jun | Jul | Aug | Sep | Oct | Nov | Dec | Year |
|---|---|---|---|---|---|---|---|---|---|---|---|---|---|
| Record high °F (°C) | 83 (28) | 91 (33) | 95 (35) | 103 (39) | 105 (41) | 114 (46) | 113 (45) | 111 (44) | 109 (43) | 100 (38) | 92 (33) | 83 (28) | 114 (46) |
| Mean maximum °F (°C) | 69.7 (20.9) | 74.7 (23.7) | 83.8 (28.8) | 89.8 (32.1) | 95.6 (35.3) | 101.6 (38.7) | 105.2 (40.7) | 102.7 (39.3) | 99.5 (37.5) | 92.6 (33.7) | 78.8 (26.0) | 68.1 (20.1) | 105.9 (41.1) |
| Mean daily maximum °F (°C) | 44.3 (6.8) | 47.9 (8.8) | 58.5 (14.7) | 67.5 (19.7) | 77.2 (25.1) | 88.2 (31.2) | 93.2 (34.0) | 90.9 (32.7) | 83.6 (28.7) | 70.5 (21.4) | 56.8 (13.8) | 45.5 (7.5) | 68.7 (20.4) |
| Daily mean °F (°C) | 30.0 (−1.1) | 33.2 (0.7) | 42.9 (6.1) | 51.9 (11.1) | 62.6 (17.0) | 73.8 (23.2) | 79.0 (26.1) | 76.7 (24.8) | 68.4 (20.2) | 54.8 (12.7) | 41.6 (5.3) | 31.7 (−0.2) | 53.9 (12.2) |
| Mean daily minimum °F (°C) | 15.7 (−9.1) | 18.5 (−7.5) | 27.3 (−2.6) | 36.3 (2.4) | 47.9 (8.8) | 59.3 (15.2) | 64.8 (18.2) | 62.6 (17.0) | 53.3 (11.8) | 39.0 (3.9) | 26.3 (−3.2) | 17.9 (−7.8) | 39.1 (3.9) |
| Mean minimum °F (°C) | −0.1 (−17.8) | 2.1 (−16.6) | 9.1 (−12.7) | 20.8 (−6.2) | 33.7 (0.9) | 46.9 (8.3) | 54.5 (12.5) | 53.1 (11.7) | 38.5 (3.6) | 22.1 (−5.5) | 10.5 (−11.9) | 1.9 (−16.7) | −6.6 (−21.4) |
| Record low °F (°C) | −19 (−28) | −24 (−31) | −21 (−29) | 10 (−12) | 20 (−7) | 37 (3) | 41 (5) | 43 (6) | 20 (−7) | 10 (−12) | −4 (−20) | −25 (−32) | −25 (−32) |
| Average precipitation inches (mm) | 0.56 (14) | 0.74 (19) | 1.40 (36) | 1.93 (49) | 2.99 (76) | 2.83 (72) | 3.83 (97) | 3.07 (78) | 1.84 (47) | 1.76 (45) | 0.76 (19) | 0.88 (22) | 22.59 (574) |
| Average snowfall inches (cm) | 3.2 (8.1) | 3.5 (8.9) | 3.3 (8.4) | 0.4 (1.0) | 0.1 (0.25) | 0.0 (0.0) | 0.0 (0.0) | 0.0 (0.0) | 0.0 (0.0) | 0.4 (1.0) | 1.3 (3.3) | 3.2 (8.1) | 15.4 (39.05) |
| Average precipitation days (≥ 0.01 in) | 2.6 | 3.2 | 4.7 | 6.4 | 7.9 | 7.5 | 6.8 | 6.5 | 4.7 | 4.4 | 2.9 | 2.9 | 60.5 |
| Average snowy days (≥ 0.1 in) | 1.8 | 1.8 | 1.2 | 0.3 | 0.0 | 0.0 | 0.0 | 0.0 | 0.0 | 0.1 | 0.4 | 1.5 | 7.1 |
Source 1: NOAA
Source 2: National Weather Service

== Demographics ==
Historical population
| Census | Pop. | Note | %± |
|---|---|---|---|
| 1880 | 31 | | — |
| 1890 | 869 | | 2,703.2% |
| 1900 | 505 | | −41.9% |
| 1910 | 712 | | 41.0% |
| 1920 | 905 | | 27.1% |
| 1930 | 1,509 | | 66.7% |
| 1940 | 1,355 | | −10.2% |
| 1950 | 1,612 | | 19.0% |
| 1960 | 1,653 | | 2.5% |
| 1970 | 1,756 | | 6.2% |
| 1980 | 1,769 | | 0.7% |
| 1990 | 1,724 | | −2.5% |
| 2000 | 1,534 | | −11.0% |
| 2010 | 1,449 | | −5.5% |
| 2020 | 1,329 | | −8.3% |
U.S. Decennial Census

=== 2020 census ===
The 2020 United States census counted 1,329 people, 595 households, and 340 families in Ness City. The population density was 913.4 per square mile (352.7/km^{2}). There were 710 housing units at an average density of 488.0 per square mile (188.4/km^{2}). The racial makeup was 86.08% (1,144) white or European American (83.45% non-Hispanic white), 0.08% (1) black or African-American, 0.6% (8) Native American or Alaska Native, 0.0% (0) Asian, 0.0% (0) Pacific Islander or Native Hawaiian, 8.2% (109) from other races, and 5.04% (67) from two or more races. Hispanic or Latino of any race was 14.15% (188) of the population.

Of the 595 households, 22.2% had children under the age of 18; 47.7% were married couples living together; 26.1% had a female householder with no spouse or partner present. 37.3% of households consisted of individuals and 19.7% had someone living alone who was 65 years of age or older. The average household size was 2.3 and the average family size was 2.8. The percent of those with a bachelor's degree or higher was estimated to be 23.3% of the population.

21.2% of the population was under the age of 18, 5.7% from 18 to 24, 19.8% from 25 to 44, 27.9% from 45 to 64, and 25.4% who were 65 years of age or older. The median age was 48.8 years. For every 100 females, there were 104.1 males. For every 100 females ages 18 and older, there were 108.6 males.

The 2016–2020 5-year American Community Survey estimates show that the median household income was $60,852 (with a margin of error of +/- $7,029) and the median family income was $76,250 (+/- $23,800). Males had a median income of $56,583 (+/- $8,414) versus $19,750 (+/- $6,232) for females. The median income for those above 16 years old was $35,417 (+/- $10,302). Approximately, 3.9% of families and 6.0% of the population were below the poverty line, including 6.0% of those under the age of 18 and 8.4% of those ages 65 or over.

=== 2010 census ===
As of the census of 2010, there were 1,449 people, 635 households, and 392 families residing in the city. The population density was 1,420.6 inhabitants per square mile (548.5/km^{2}). There were 739 housing units at an average density of 724.5 per square mile (279.7/km^{2}). The racial makeup of the city was 97.0% White, 0.3% African American, 0.1% Native American, 0.2% Asian, 1.6% from other races, and 0.8% from two or more races. Hispanic or Latino of any race were 8.9% of the population.

There were 635 households, of which 26.5% had children under the age of 18 living with them, 52.9% were married couples living together, 5.5% had a female householder with no husband present, 3.3% had a male householder with no wife present, and 38.3% were non-families. 35.9% of all households were made up of individuals, and 17.1% had someone living alone who was 65 years of age or older. The average household size was 2.21 and the average family size was 2.85.

The median age in the city was 47.5 years. 23% of residents were under the age of 18; 4.8% were between the ages of 18 and 24; 19.2% were from 25 to 44; 27.7% were from 45 to 64; and 25.3% were 65 years of age or older. The gender makeup of the city was 49.1% male and 50.9% female.

== Education ==
The community is served by Ness City USD 303 public school district. Ness City is also served by Sacred Heard School (administered by the Diocese of Dodge City), which serves K-8.
