= Brantford Township, Kansas =

Township in Washington County, Kansas, U.S.

Brantford Township
- Township
- Location within Washington County
- Coordinates: 39.692686°N 97.310567°W
- Country: United States
- State: Kansas
- County: Washington

Government
  - District 3 Commissioner: Raleigh Ordoyne

Area
  - Total: 35.935 sq mi (93.07 km^{2})
  - Land: 35.791 sq mi (92.70 km^{2})
  - Water: 0.144 sq mi (0.37 km^{2}) 0.40%

Population (2020)
  - Total: 60
  - Density: 1.7/sq mi (0.65/km^{2})
- Time zone: UTC-6 (CST)
  - Summer (DST): UTC-5 (CDT)
- Area code: 785
- GNIS feature ID: 473109

Brantford Township is a township in Washington County, Kansas, United States. As of the 2020 census, its population was 60.

== History ==
Brantford Township was created from Strawberry Township and Clifton Township. Brantford Township is also home to two now-extinct towns: Brantford and Calderhead. Brantford's post office was open from 1871 to 1908 and had a population of 75 in 1910. Calderhead's post office was open from 1898 to 1901. Part of the ghost town of Strawberry lies within the township as well.

== Geography ==
Brantford Township covers an area of 35.935 square miles (93.07 km^{2}), 0.4% of it water. Parsons Creek flows through the township.

=== Adjacent townships ===
Grant Township, Washington County
Richland Township, Republic County	northwest	north	northeast	Coleman Township, Washington County
Elk Creek Township, Republic County	west	self	east	Strawberry Township, Washington County
Elk Township, Cloud County	southwest	south	southeast	Sheridan Township, Washington County
Clifton Township, Washington County

== Transportation ==
=== Major highways ===
- K-148

== Demographics ==
As of the 2020 census, the township had a population of 60, giving a population density of 1.7 people per square mile (0.66 people/km^{2}). The racial makeup of the township was 98.3% White and 1.7% from some other race. Hispanics or Latinos of any race were 1.7% of the population.

The 2020–2024 American Community Survey estimated that the township contained 39 households and 73 housing units.
