= National Register of Historic Places listings in Republic County, Kansas =

Location of Republic County in Kansas

This is a list of the National Register of Historic Places listings in Republic County, Kansas.

This is intended to be a complete list of the properties and districts on the National Register of Historic Places in Republic County, Kansas, United States. The locations of National Register properties and districts for which the latitude and longitude coordinates are included below, may be seen in a map.

There are 13 properties and districts listed on the National Register in the county.

This National Park Service list is complete through NPS recent listings posted September 4, 2026.

== Current listings ==
	Name on the Register	Image	Date listed	Location	City or town	Description
1	Belleville High School	Belleville High School	June 25, 2013 (#13000434)	915 W.18th Street; 39°49′28″N 97°38′02″W	Belleville	
2	Cossaart Barn	Cossaart Barn	December 30, 2009 (#09001166)	3040 Birch Rd. 39°59′22″N 97°22′47″W	Narka	
3	County Line Bowstring	County Line Bowstring	January 4, 1990 (#89002192)	Over West Creek, northwest of Hollis; 39°39′12″N 97°34′21″W	Wayne	
4	Cuba Blacksmith Shop	Cuba Blacksmith Shop	October 8, 2009 (#09000810)	½ block west of Baird St. on Lynn St. 39°48′02″N 97°27′31″W	Cuba	
5	East Riley Creek Bridge	East Riley Creek Bridge	January 4, 1990 (#89002176)	Over East Riley Creek, south of Belleville; 39°47′17″N 97°37′58″W	Belleville	
6	Pawnee Indian Village Site	Pawnee Indian Village Site	May 14, 1971 (#71000325)	On K-266 and the Republican River; 39°54′30″N 97°51′38″W	Republic	
7	Republic County Courthouse	Republic County Courthouse	April 26, 2002 (#02000393)	Bounded by M St., 18th St., N St., and 19th St. 39°49′05″N 97°37′24″W	Belleville	
8	Riley Creek Bridge	Riley Creek Bridge	January 4, 1990 (#89002175)	Over Riley Creek, south of Belleville; 39°47′16″N 97°37′56″W	Belleville	
9	Shimanek Barn	Shimanek Barn	April 8, 2009 (#09000194)	1806 220 Road; 39°54′03″N 97°32′20″W	Munden	Agriculture-Related Resources of Kansas MPS
10	Site No. JF00-072	Site No. JF00-072	June 19, 1987 (#87001000)	Junction of Thayer, Jefferson, Washington, and Republic County lines 40°00′07″N 97°22′09″W	Mahaska	
11	S.T. Stevenson House	S.T. Stevenson House	July 8, 2010 (#10000451)	2012 N St. 39°49′18″N 97°37′45″W	Belleville	
12	US Post Office-Belleville	US Post Office-Belleville	October 17, 1989 (#89001633)	1119 18th St. 39°49′28″N 97°37′57″W	Belleville	
13	Woodland Place Stock Farm	Woodland Place Stock Farm	December 29, 2015 (#15000938)	180 Hickory Rd. 39°54′00″N 97°55′02″W	Courtland	

== See also ==
- List of National Historic Landmarks in Kansas
- National Register of Historic Places listings in Kansas
