= Grant Township, Republic County, Kansas =

Township in Republic County, Kansas, U.S.

Grant Township
- Township
- Location within Republic County
- Coordinates: 39.697068°N 97.537882°W
- Country: United States
- State: Kansas
- County: Republic

Government
  - District 1 County Commissioner: Edwin G. Splichal

Area
  - Total: 36.578 sq mi (94.74 km^{2})
  - Land: 36.497 sq mi (94.53 km^{2})
  - Water: 0.081 sq mi (0.21 km^{2}) 0.22%

Population (2020)
  - Total: 51
  - Density: 1.4/sq mi (0.54/km^{2})
- Time zone: UTC-6 (CST)
  - Summer (DST): UTC-5 (CDT)
- Area code: 785
- GNIS feature ID: 473088

Grant Township is a township in Republic County, Kansas, United States. As of the 2020 census, its population was 51.

== Geography ==
Grant Township covers an area of 36.578 square miles (94.74 square kilometers).

=== Communities ===
- Wayne

=== Adjacent townships ===
Jefferson Township, Republic County
Belleville Township, Republic County	northwest	north	northeast	Richland Township, Republic County
Lincoln Township, Republic County	west	self	east	Elk Creek Township, Republic County
Sibley Township, Cloud County	southwest	south	southeast	Elk Township, Cloud County
Lawrence Township, Cloud County

== Transportation ==
=== Major highways ===
- K-148
