= Norway Township, Kansas =

Township in Republic County, Kansas, U.S.

Norway Township
- Township
- Location within Republic County
- Coordinates: 39.700°N 97.765°W
- Country: United States
- State: Kansas
- County: Republic
- Established: 1871

Government
  - District 2 County Commissioner: Tim Eitzmann

Area
  - Total: 35.966 sq mi (93.15 km^{2})
  - Land: 35.657 sq mi (92.35 km^{2})
  - Water: 0.309 sq mi (0.80 km^{2}) 0.86%

Population (2020)
  - Total: 117
  - Density: 3.28/sq mi (1.27/km^{2})
- Time zone: UTC-6 (CST)
  - Summer (DST): UTC-5 (CDT)
- Area code: 785
- GNIS feature ID: 485432

Norway Township is a township in Republic County, Kansas, United States. As of the 2020 census, its population was 117.

== History ==
Norway Township was organized in 1871. The township was split off from Grant Township.

== Geography ==
Norway Township covers an area of 35.966 square miles (93.15 square kilometers). The Republican River flows through it.

=== Communities ===
- Norway

=== Adjacent townships ===
Scandia Township, Republic County
Courtland Township, Republic County	northwest	north	northeast	Belleville Township, Republic County
Beaver Township, Republic County	west	self	east	Lincoln Township, Republic County
Grant Township, Cloud County	southwest	south	southeast	Sibley Township, Cloud County
Buffalo Township, Cloud County

== Transportation ==
=== Major highways ===
- K-148
