= County Line Bowstring =

- U.S. National Register of Historic Places
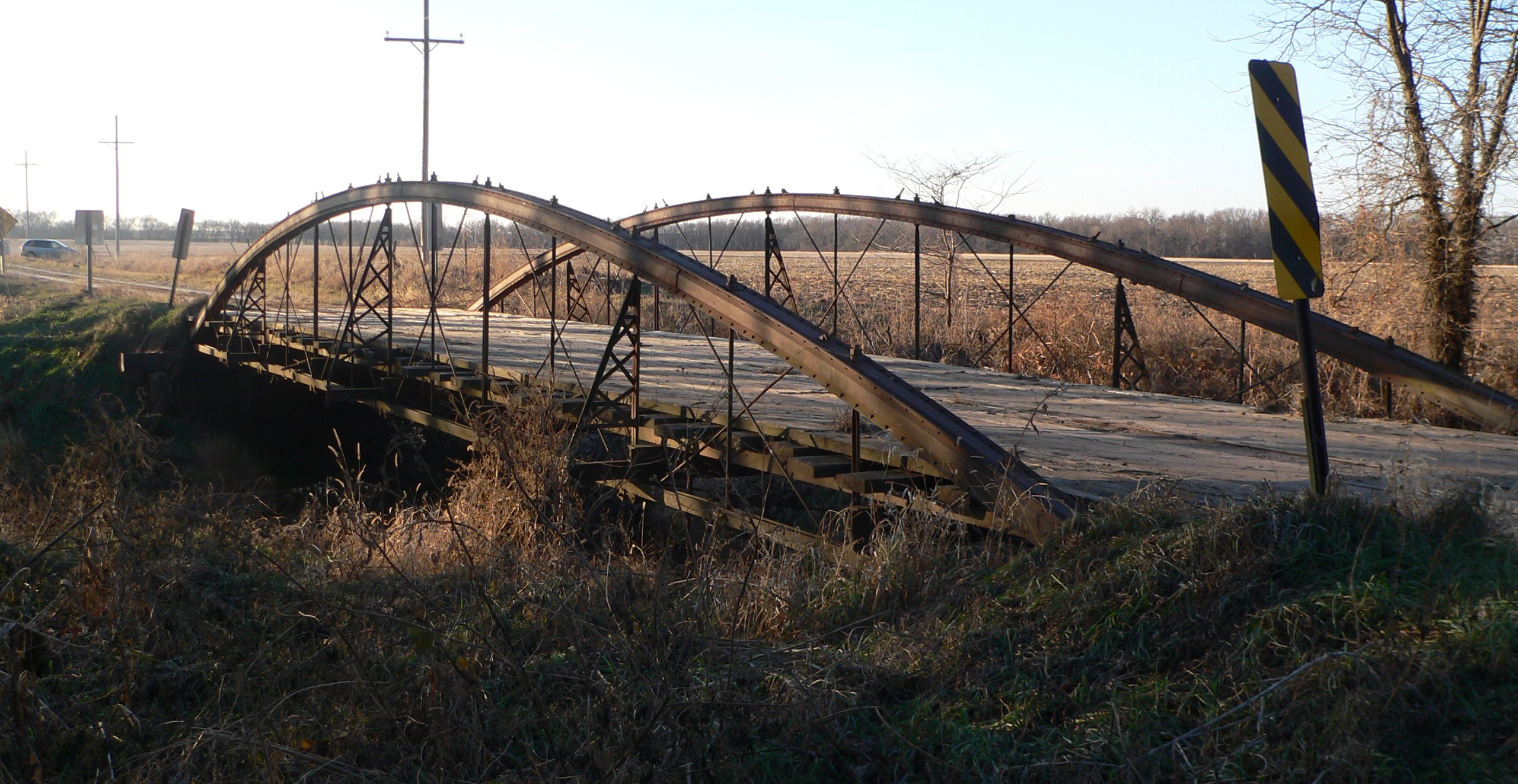

- Location within Kansas Location within the United States
- Location: Cloud County, Republic County
- Nearest city: Wayne, Kansas
- Coordinates: 39°39′14″N 97°34′23″W
- Built: 1876
- Built by: Wrought Iron Bridge Company
- Architect: Phoenix Bridge Co.
- Architectural style: Bowstring pony truss
- MPS: Metal Truss Bridges in Kansas 1861–1939 MPS
- NRHP reference No.: 89002192
- Added to NRHP: January 4, 1990

The County Line Bowstring is a bridge located near unincorporated Hollis, Kansas, United States, that is listed on the National Register of Historic Places. It spans West Creek on the border between Cloud and Republic counties and has a wooden deck with a bowstring pony truss.

It is a single-span Bowstring arch truss bridge which is 80 feet (24 m) long and 16 feet (4.9 m) wide.

The span was built in 1876 by the Wrought Iron Bridge Co. of Ohio, as one of four spans in a bridge crossing in Concordia, Kansas. Later the four spans were removed to different locations in the area. It crosses West Creek, a tributary to the Republican River.

As of 2010, the bridge is open to one-lane automobile traffic on a low-maintenance county road.

== See also ==
- National Register of Historic Places listings in Cloud County, Kansas
- National Register of Historic Places listings in Republic County, Kansas
