= Elk Creek Township, Kansas =

Township in Republic County, Kansas, U.S.

Elk Creek Township
- Township
- Location within Republic County
- Coordinates: 39.7047°N 97.4189°W
- Country: United States
- State: Kansas
- County: Republic
- Established: 1871

Government
  - District 1 County Commissioner: Edwin G. Splichal

Area
  - Total: 35.917 sq mi (93.02 km^{2})
  - Land: 35.83 sq mi (92.8 km^{2})
  - Water: 0.087 sq mi (0.23 km^{2}) 0.24%

Population (2020)
  - Total: 111
  - Density: 3.10/sq mi (1.20/km^{2})
- Time zone: UTC-6 (CST)
  - Summer (DST): UTC-5 (CDT)
- Area code: 785
- GNIS feature ID: 473102

Elk Creek Township is a township in Republic County, Kansas, United States. As of the 2020 census, its population was 111.

== History ==
Elk Creek Township was organized in 1871 and named after Elk Creek. What would become Elk Creek Township was first settled in 1868. Elk Creek was split off from Grant Township.

== Geography ==
Elk Creek Township covers an area of 35.917 square miles (93.02 square kilometers).

=== Communities ===
- Agenda

=== Adjacent townships ===
Richland Township, Republic County
Jefferson Township, Republic County	northwest	north	northeast	Grant Township, Washington County
Grant Township, Republic County	west	self	east	Brantford Township, Washington County
Lawrence Township, Cloud County	southwest	south	southeast	Clifton Township, Washington County
Elk Township, Cloud County

== Transportation ==
=== Major highways ===
- K-148
