= Lincoln Township, Republic County, Kansas =

Township in Republic County, Kansas, U.S.

Lincoln Township
- Township
- Location within Republic County
- Coordinates: 39.6975°N 97.6492°W
- Country: United States
- State: Kansas
- County: Republic
- Established: 1871

Government
  - District 3 County Commissioner: Doug Jackson

Area
  - Total: 35.6 sq mi (92 km^{2})
  - Land: 35.515 sq mi (91.98 km^{2})
  - Water: 0.085 sq mi (0.22 km^{2}) 0.24%

Population (2020)
  - Total: 106
  - Density: 2.98/sq mi (1.15/km^{2})
- Time zone: UTC-6 (CST)
  - Summer (DST): UTC-5 (CDT)
- Area code: 785
- GNIS feature ID: 485437

Lincoln Township is a township in Republic County, Kansas, United States. As of the 2020 census, its population was 106.

== History ==
Lincoln Township was organized in 1871. It was split off from Grant Township.

== Geography ==
Lincoln Township covers an area of 35.6 square miles (92 square kilometers).

=== Adjacent townships ===
Belleville Township, Republic County
Scandia Township, Republic County	northwest	north	northeast	Jefferson Township, Republic County
Norway Township, Republic County	west	self	east	Grant Township, Republic County
		south	southeast	Lawrence Township, Cloud County
Sibley Township, Cloud County

== Transportation ==
=== Major highways ===
- US-81
- K-148
