= Strawberry, Kansas =

Ghost town in Washington County, Kansas

- Ghost town
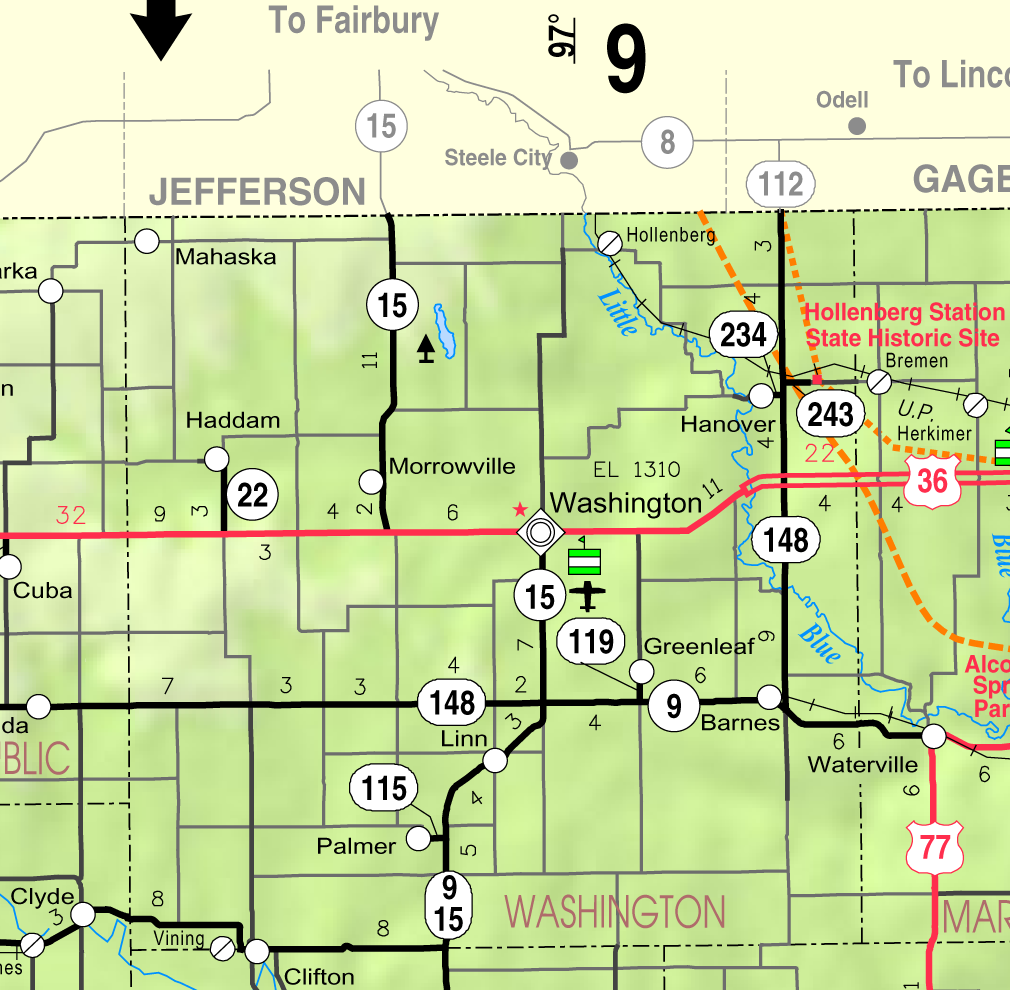
- KDOT map of Washington County (legend)

- Location within Kansas Location within the United States
- Coordinates: 39°42′43″N 97°15′19″W
- Country: United States
- State: Kansas
- County: Washington
- Founded: 1861
- Disincorporated: 1951
- Named for: wild strawberries

Population
  - Total: 0
- Time zone: UTC-6 (CST)
  - Summer (DST): UTC-5 (CDT)

Strawberry is a ghost town in Washington County, Kansas, United States. It was first settled in the spring of 1861 and was named after the wild strawberries growing in the area.

== History ==
Strawberry was first settled in the spring of 1861 by John Mildfelt, John Gieber, and Peter Gieber. Other settlers followed, including Peter George Stegman in 1865, and William Bell in 1868. The town's first wedding took place on January 1, 1868, between John Gieber and Susanna Kieffer. By this year, five families lived in the town, home to a post office, a general store, and a school district. The general store was the town center, owned by Art Leiszler. The Leiszler family also ran the post office. Peter Gieber was the first postmaster.

The town's first death took place in 1870. Katherine Myers was driving her cattle home when night fell. She became disoriented and got lost. She wandered into Republic County and was shot when a settler mistook her for a wolf.

On July 2, 1871, residents from the northern part of Clifton Township presented a petition to the county board to form a new township. The petition was granted. The township of Strawberry was officially created. It was named by Roger Howley and a Mr. Alcott after the wild strawberries growing in the area, specifically after a large bed near the town center.

The town was also home to School District #18. A one-room schoolhouse was built made of limestone near the general store. It had one teacher who taught eight grades. Hulda Ellsworth was the school's first teacher who taught its first term in 1872.

The post office was disbanded in 1904.

In 1909, the Leiszlers built a skating rink and a dance hall which became a popular destination for travelers.

In 1910, Strawberry's population declined to 52 people due to bad roads and transportation. During the Great Depression, this number decreased further. The skating rink and dance hall were still very popular. In the 20s and 30s, many cars in the area had spare tire covers reading, "I Danced at the Strawberry Pavilion".

In 1951, Strawberry's remaining buildings were demolished to make way for the construction of Kansas Highway 148.

On August 12, 1990, a marker was placed near the site to commemorate the former town. Three hundred people attended a ceremony where archivist Dan Fitzgerald of the Kansas Historical Society spoke about ghost towns.

== Geography ==
The land around Strawberry is a prairie tillable for farming. Several streams, including Parsons Creek which runs through the town center, flow south into the Republican River.

== Demographics ==
Historical population
Census	Pop.	Note	%±
1880	1,258		—
1910	52		—
Strawberry, Kansas Washington County

Strawberry's population "at the outset" was 436. In 1878, the population was 934, and in 1880, it was 1,258. By 1910, however, the population declined to 52 people due to poor roads and transportation. This number further decreased during the Great Depression.
