= Salt marsh (disambiguation) =

Salt marsh may refer to:

- Salt marsh, a marsh regularly inundated by salty ocean tides
- Salt Marsh Opera, an opera company named for salt marshes Connecticut and Rhode Island
- Inland salt marsh, a saltwater marsh located away from any ocean coast
- Saltmarsh (surname), an English surname
- Salt Marsh, the original name of the abandoned Seapo, Kansas
