= Beaver Township, Republic County, Kansas =

Township in Republic County, Kansas, U.S.

Beaver Township
- Township
- Location within Republic County
- Coordinates: 39.70°N 97.87°W
- Country: United States
- State: Kansas
- County: Republic
- Established: 1873

Government
  - District 2 County Commissioner: Tim Eitzmann

Area
  - Total: 36.016 sq mi (93.28 km^{2})
  - Land: 35.233 sq mi (91.25 km^{2})
  - Water: 0.783 sq mi (2.03 km^{2}) 2.17%

Population (2020)
  - Total: 95
  - Density: 2.7/sq mi (1.0/km^{2})
- Time zone: UTC-6 (CST)
  - Summer (DST): UTC-5 (CDT)
- Area code: 785
- GNIS feature ID: 473071

Beaver Township is a township in Republic County, Kansas, United States. As of the 2020 census, its population was 95.

== History ==
Beaver Township was organized in 1873 and was named after Beaver Creek. The first settlers in the township were E. B. Pedersen and T. A. Nelson, who settled there in 1869. The early population of the township had significant amounts of Swedish and Norwegian immigrants.

== Geography ==
Beaver Township covers an area of 36.016 square miles (93.28 square kilometers).

=== Communities ===
- Kackley

=== Adjacent townships ===
Courtland Township, Republic County
Grant Township, Jewell County	northwest	north	northeast	Scandia Township, Republic County
Vicksburg Township, Jewell County	west	self	east	Norway Township, Republic County
Allen Township, Jewell County	southwest	south	southeast	Buffalo Township, Cloud County
Grant Township, Cloud County

== Transportation ==
=== Major highways ===
- K-148
