= Big Bend Township, Kansas =

Township in Republic County, Kansas

Big Bend Township
- Township
- Location within Republic County
- Coordinates: 39.960°N 97.876°W
- Country: United States
- State: Kansas
- County: Republic
- Established: 1872

Government
  - District 2 County Commissioner: Tim Eitzmann

Area
  - Total: 36 sq mi (93 km^{2})
  - Land: 35.7 sq mi (92 km^{2})
  - Water: 0.3 sq mi (0.78 km^{2}) 0.83%

Population (2020)
  - Total: 125
  - Density: 3.50/sq mi (1.35/km^{2})
- Time zone: UTC-6 (CST)
  - Summer (DST): UTC-5 (CDT)
- Area code: 785
- GNIS feature ID: 472570

Big Bend Township is a township in Republic County, Kansas, United States. As of the 2020 census, its population was 125.

== History ==
Big Bend Township was organized in 1872. The first settler in what would become the township was Daniel Davis, and the post office was established in 1871.

== Geography ==
Big Bend Township covers an area of 36 square miles (93 square kilometers). The Republican River and White Rock Creek flow through it.

=== Communities ===
- part of Republic

=== Adjacent townships ===
Nuckolls County, Nebraska
		north	northeast	Thayer County, Nebraska
Jackson Township, Jewell County	west	self	east	Washington Township, Republic County
Sinclair Township, Jewell County	southwest	south	southeast	Union Township, Republic County
White Rock Township, Republic County
