= Albion Township, Republic County, Kansas =

Township in Republic County, Kansas, U.S.

Albion Township
- Township
- Location within Republic County
- Coordinates: 39.958104°N 97.425397°W
- Country: United States
- State: Kansas
- County: Republic
- Established: 1870

Government
  - District 1 County Commissioner: Edwin G. Splichal

Area
  - Total: 35.722 sq mi (92.52 km^{2})
  - Land: 35.691 sq mi (92.44 km^{2})
  - Water: 0.031 sq mi (0.080 km^{2}) 0.09%

Population (2020)
  - Total: 130
  - Density: 3.6/sq mi (1.4/km^{2})
- Time zone: UTC-6 (CST)
  - Summer (DST): UTC-5 (CDT)
- Area code: 785
- GNIS feature ID: 472609

Albion Township is a township in Republic County, Kansas, United States. As of the 2020 census, its population was 130.

== History ==
Albion Township was organized in 1870. The township was split off from Farmington Township.

== Geography ==
Albion Township covers an area of 35.722 square miles (92.52 square kilometers).

=== Communities ===
- Narka

=== Adjacent townships ===
Thayer County, Nebraska
		north	northeast	Jefferson County, Nebraska
Rose Creek Township, Republic County	west	self	east	Union Township, Washington County
Fairview Township, Republic County	southwest	south	southeast	Haddam Township, Washington County
Farmington Township, Republic County
