= Courtland Township =

Courtland Township may refer to the following places in the United States:

- Courtland Township, Republic County, Kansas
- Courtland Township, Michigan
- Courtland Township, Nicollet County, Minnesota
