= Seapo, Kansas =

Coordinates: 39°40′50″N 97°32′31″W

Seapo was a rural community in Grant Township in Republic County, Kansas, United States, first established as Salt Marsh in 1866.

The abandoned townsite adjoins the Talmo Marsh Wildlife Area, an inland salt marsh.

== History ==
The now extinct town of Seapo was located two miles south of Wayne on the eastern edge of the Great Salt Marsh. The area that was once platted into city blocks is now nothing but open crop field.

The post office at Salt Marsh, which was the original name of Seapo, was established July 9, 1866, and was the first post office in Republic County. It was also one of only three post offices between Manhattan and Denver. The post office was discontinued September 25, 1889.

Seapo was the oldest village in Republic County. The town was "well laid out on a level plain", but "without tree or fence ornaments". There were three church organizations: Christian, Methodist, and Presbyterian, and a school building.

Just north of the town was a three-story gristmill. The Seapo Mill was built in 1872 by A. W. Miller, who also operated the mill. The construction of the native limestone mill cost $12,000 and was financed by T. B. Hazen, who ran a store in Seapo. The mill was originally powered by running water but later by a 45 horsepower steam engine. The mill was capable of running five run of burr stones with a capacity of 100 barrels of flour per day. The mill was converted into a house in 1898.
