= Washington Township, Republic County, Kansas =

Township in Republic County, Kansas, U.S.

Washington Township
- Township
- Location within Republic County
- Coordinates: 39.9603°N 97.7672°W
- Country: United States
- State: Kansas
- County: Republic
- Established: 1872

Government
  - District 2 County Commissioner: Tim Eitzmann

Area
  - Total: 36.023 sq mi (93.30 km^{2})
  - Land: 35.916 sq mi (93.02 km^{2})
  - Water: 0.107 sq mi (0.28 km^{2}) 0.30%

Population (2020)
  - Total: 74
  - Density: 2.1/sq mi (0.80/km^{2})
- Time zone: UTC-6 (CST)
  - Summer (DST): UTC-5 (CDT)
- Area code: 785
- GNIS feature ID: 472591

Washington Township is a township in Republic County, Kansas, United States. As of the 2020 census, its population was 74.

== History ==
Washington Township was organized in 1872.

== Geography ==
Washington Township covers an area of 36.023 square miles (93.30 square kilometers).

=== Communities ===
- part of Republic

=== Adjacent townships ===
Thayer County, Nebraska
		north
Big Bend Township, Republic County	west	self	east	Liberty Township, Republic County
White Rock Township, Republic County	southwest	south	southeast	Freedom Township, Republic County
Union Township, Republic County
