= Rose Creek Township, Kansas =

Township in Republic County, Kansas

Rose Creek Township
- Township
- Location within Republic County
- Coordinates: 39.9625°N 97.5414°W
- Country: United States
- State: Kansas
- County: Republic
- Established: 1871

Government
  - District 1 County Commissioner: Edwin G. Splichal

Area
  - Total: 36.493 sq mi (94.52 km^{2})
  - Land: 36.411 sq mi (94.30 km^{2})
  - Water: 0.082 sq mi (0.21 km^{2}) 0.22%

Population (2020)
  - Total: 118
  - Density: 3.24/sq mi (1.25/km^{2})
- Time zone: UTC-6 (CST)
  - Summer (DST): UTC-5 (CDT)
- Area code: 785
- GNIS feature ID: 472602

Rose Creek Township is a township in Republic County, Kansas, United States. As of the 2020 census, its population was 118.

== Etymology ==
Rose Creek Township takes its name from Rose Creek, which flows through the northeastern section of the township.

== History ==
Rose Creek Township was formed in 1871 and was made partially of parts of Farmington Township. The township is home to the extinct town of Ida, whose post office opened in 1873. Ida was originally known as Royseville until 1876. The expansion of railways into communities near Ida caused the town to decline, eventually closing its post office in 1885.

== Geography ==
Rose Creek Township covers an area of 36.493 square miles (94.52 square kilometers).

=== Communities ===
- part of Munden

=== Adjacent townships ===
Thayer County, Nebraska
		north
Liberty Township, Republic County	west	self	east	Albion Township, Republic County
Freedom Township, Republic County	southwest	south	southeast	Farmington Township, Republic County
Fairview Township, Republic County
