= Fairview Township, Republic County, Kansas =

Township in Republic County, Kansas, U.S.

Fairview Township
- Township
- Location within Republic County
- Coordinates: 39°52′14″N 97°32′18″W
- Country: United States
- State: Kansas
- County: Republic
- Established: 1871

Government
  - District 1 County Commissioner: Edwin G. Splichal

Area
  - Total: 36.486 sq mi (94.50 km^{2})
  - Land: 36.42 sq mi (94.3 km^{2})
  - Water: 0.066 sq mi (0.17 km^{2}) 0.18%

Population (2020)
  - Total: 113
  - Density: 3.10/sq mi (1.20/km^{2})
- Time zone: UTC-6 (CST)
  - Summer (DST): UTC-5 (CDT)
- Area code: 785
- GNIS feature ID: 472603

Fairview Township is a township in Republic County, Kansas, United States. As of the 2020 census, its population was 113.

== History ==
Fairview Township was originally settled in 1870 and organized in 1871.

== Geography ==
Beaver Township covers an area of 36.486 square miles (94.50 square kilometers).

=== Communities ===
- part of Munden

=== Adjacent townships ===
Rose Creek Township, Republic County
Liberty Township, Republic County	northwest	north	northeast	Albion Township, Republic County
Freedom Township, Republic County	west	self	east	Farmington Township, Republic County
Belleville Township, Republic County	southwest	south	southeast	Richland Township, Republic County
Jefferson Township, Republic County
