= Liberty Township, Republic County, Kansas =

Township in Republic County, Kansas, U.S.

Liberty Township
- Township
- Location within Republic County
- Coordinates: 39.9619°N 97.6447°W
- Country: United States
- State: Kansas
- County: Republic
- Established: 1871

Government
  - District 2 County Commissioner: Tim Eitzmann

Area
  - Total: 36.195 sq mi (93.74 km^{2})
  - Land: 36.127 sq mi (93.57 km^{2})
  - Water: 0.068 sq mi (0.18 km^{2}) 0.19%

Population (2020)
  - Total: 39
  - Density: 1.1/sq mi (0.42/km^{2})
- Time zone: UTC-6 (CST)
  - Summer (DST): UTC-5 (CDT)
- Area code: 785
- GNIS feature ID: 472595

Liberty Township is a township in Republic County, Kansas, United States. As of the 2020 census, its population was 39.

== History ==
Liberty Township was organized in 1871.

== Geography ==
Liberty Township covers an area of 36.195 square miles (93.74 square kilometers).

=== Adjacent townships ===
Thayer County, Nebraska
		north
Washington Township, Republic County	west	self	east	Rose Creek Township, Republic County
Union Township, Republic County	southwest	south	southeast	Fairview Township, Republic County
Freedom Township, Republic County

== Transportation ==
=== Major highways ===
- US-81
