= Richland Township, Republic County, Kansas =

Township in Republic County, Kansas, U.S.

Richland Township
- Township
- Location within Republic County
- Coordinates: 39.7917°N 97.4344°W
- Country: United States
- State: Kansas
- County: Republic
- Established: 1871

Government
  - District 1 County Commissioner: Edwin G. Splichal

Area
  - Total: 35.834 sq mi (92.81 km^{2})
  - Land: 35.773 sq mi (92.65 km^{2})
  - Water: 0.061 sq mi (0.16 km^{2}) 0.17%

Population (2020)
  - Total: 218
  - Density: 6.09/sq mi (2.35/km^{2})
- Time zone: UTC-6 (CST)
  - Summer (DST): UTC-5 (CDT)
- Area code: 785
- GNIS feature ID: 472852

Richland Township is a township in Republic County, Kansas, United States. As of the 2020 census, its population was 218.

== History ==
Richland Township was organized in 1871. The township was formed partially from Farmington Township.

== Geography ==
Richland Township covers an area of 35.834 square miles (92.81 square kilometers).

=== Communities ===
- Cuba

=== Adjacent townships ===
Farmington Township, Republic County
Fairview Township, Republic County	northwest	north	northeast	Haddam Township, Washington County
Jefferson Township, Republic County	west	self	east	Grant Township, Washington County
Grant Township, Republic County	southwest	south	southeast	Brantford Township, Washington County
Elk Creek Township, Republic County

== Transportation ==
=== Major highways ===
- US-36
