= J. C. Humphrey =

Canadian-American publisher

James Cobin Humphrey (2 September 1845 – May 1910) was a Canadian-American publisher who was the founder of the Belleville Telescope, a newspaper in Republic County, Kansas. It was the first paper in the county, established September 20, 1870, when there were only two houses in the town of Belleville.

Humphrey was born in Milton, Ontario, Canada in 1845 and moved first to Ohio, then back to Canada, and finally arriving in Kansas to homestead in 1870.
