= Freedom Township, Republic County, Kansas =

Township in Republic County, Kansas, U.S.

Freedom Township
- Township
- Location within Republic County
- Coordinates: 39.867°N 97.655°W
- Country: United States
- State: Kansas
- County: Republic
- Established: 1871

Government
  - District 1 County Commissioner: Edwin G. Splichal

Area
  - Total: 34.689 sq mi (89.84 km^{2})
  - Land: 34.626 sq mi (89.68 km^{2})
  - Water: 0.063 sq mi (0.16 km^{2}) 0.18%

Population (2020)
  - Total: 136
  - Density: 3.93/sq mi (1.52/km^{2})
- Time zone: UTC-6 (CST)
  - Summer (DST): UTC-5 (CDT)
- Area code: 785
- GNIS feature ID: 472596

Freedom Township is a township in Republic County, Kansas, United States. As of the 2020 census, its population was 136.

== History ==
Freedom Township was organized in 1871. What would become the township was first settled in 1870 by Dr. A. B. Tutton.

== Geography ==
Freedom Township covers an area of 34.689 square miles (93.02 square kilometers).

=== Adjacent townships ===
Liberty Township, Republic County
Washington Township, Republic County	northwest	north	northeast	Rose Creek Township, Republic County
Union Township, Republic County	west	self	east	Fairview Township, Republic County
Scandia Township, Republic County	southwest	south	southeast	Jefferson Township, Republic County
Belleville Township, Republic County

== Transportation ==
=== Major highways ===
- US-81
