= Belleville Telescope =

- Type: Weekly newspaper
- Founder(s): J. C. Humphrey
- Publisher: Fred Arnold
- Founded: September 20, 1870
- Headquarters: 1805 N St., Belleville, KS 66935
- Circulation: 2,765
- Website: thebellevilletelescope.com

The Belleville Telescope is a local newspaper in Belleville, Kansas. It was the first paper in Republic County, established September 20, 1870, by J. C. Humphrey (some records show "J. C. Murphy") and at that time there were only two houses in the town. It was suspended February 1, 1872 and started again July 3, 1873 as an eight-column folio. The paper has been in regular circulation since. In 1904, the paper was purchased by A.Q. Miller, namesake of the A.Q. Miller School of Journalism and Mass Communications at Kansas State University. It is one of the oldest newspapers in the U.S.
