= Scandia Township, Kansas =

Township in Republic County, Kansas, U.S.

Scandia Township
- Township
- Location within Republic County
- Coordinates: 39.7836°N 97.7622°W
- Country: United States
- State: Kansas
- County: Republic
- Established: 1871

Government
  - District 2 County Commissioner: Tim Eitzmann

Area
  - Total: 35.968 sq mi (93.16 km^{2})
  - Land: 35.631 sq mi (92.28 km^{2})
  - Water: 0.337 sq mi (0.87 km^{2}) 0.94%

Population (2020)
  - Total: 426
  - Density: 12.0/sq mi (4.62/km^{2})
- Time zone: UTC-6 (CST)
  - Summer (DST): UTC-5 (CDT)
- Area code: 785
- GNIS feature ID: 485430

Scandia Township is a township in Republic County, Kansas, United States. As of the 2020 census, its population was 426.

== History ==
Scandia Township was organized in 1871. It was named for the Scandinavian pioneer settlers.

== Geography ==
Scandia Township covers an area of 35.968 square miles (93.16 square kilometers). The Republican River flows through it.

=== Communities ===
- Scandia

=== Adjacent townships ===
Union Township, Republic County
White Rock Township, Republic County	northwest	north	northeast	Freedom Township, Republic County
Courtland Township, Republic County	west	self	east	Belleville Township, Republic County
Beaver Township, Republic County	southwest	south	southeast	Lincoln Township, Republic County
Norway Township, Republic County

== Transportation ==
=== Major highways ===
- US-36
