= White Rock Township, Republic County, Kansas =

Township in Republic County, Kansas, U.S.

White Rock Township
- Township
- Location within Republic County
- Coordinates: 39.8703°N 97.8747°W
- Country: United States
- State: Kansas
- County: Republic
- Established: 1870

Government
  - District 2 County Commissioner: Tim Eitzmann

Area
  - Total: 36.061 sq mi (93.40 km^{2})
  - Land: 35.81 sq mi (92.7 km^{2})
  - Water: 0.251 sq mi (0.65 km^{2}) 0.70%

Population (2020)
  - Total: 50
  - Density: 1.4/sq mi (0.54/km^{2})
- Time zone: UTC-6 (CST)
  - Summer (DST): UTC-5 (CDT)
- Area code: 785
- GNIS feature ID: 472571

White Rock Township is a township in Republic County, Kansas, United States. As of the 2020 census, its population was 50.

== Etymology ==
White Rock Township was named after White Rock Creek, which flows through the northwestern section of the township.

== History ==
White Rock Township was organized in 1870. The township is home to the Pawnee Indian Museum State Historic Site and the ghost town of White Rock.

== Geography ==
White Rock Township covers an area of 36.061 square miles (93.40 square kilometers). The Republican River flows through it.

=== Adjacent townships ===
Big Bend Township, Republic County
Jackson Township, Jewell County	northwest	north	northeast	Washington Township, Republic County
Sinclair Township, Jewell County	west	self	east	Union Township, Republic County
Grant Township, Jewell County	southwest	south	southeast	Scandia Township, Republic County
Courtland Township, Republic County

== Transportation ==
=== Major highways ===
- K-266
