= Farmington Township, Republic County, Kansas =

Township in Republic County, Kansas, U.S.

Farmington Township
- Township
- Location within Republic County
- Coordinates: 39.87356°N 97.423626°W
- Country: United States
- State: Kansas
- County: Republic
- Established: 1868

Government
  - District 1 County Commissioner: Edwin G. Splichal

Area
  - Total: 35.852 sq mi (92.86 km^{2})
  - Land: 35.787 sq mi (92.69 km^{2})
  - Water: 0.065 sq mi (0.17 km^{2}) 0.18%

Population (2020)
  - Total: 58
  - Density: 1.6/sq mi (0.63/km^{2})
- Time zone: UTC-6 (CST)
  - Summer (DST): UTC-5 (CDT)
- Area code: 785
- GNIS feature ID: 472610

Farmington Township is a township in Republic County, Kansas, United States. As of the 2020 census, its population was 58.

== History ==
Farmington Township was the first township organized in Republic County, in 1868. Z. P. Rowe and Jacob Hull were the first settlers.

== Geography ==
Farmington Township covers an area of 35.852 square miles (92.86 square kilometers).

=== Adjacent townships ===
Albion Township, Republic County
Rose Creek Township, Republic County	northwest	north	northeast	Union Township, Washington County
Fairview Township, Republic County	west	self	east	Haddam Township, Washington County
Jefferson Township, Republic County	southwest	south	southeast	Grant Township, Washington County
Richland Township, Republic County
