= Thomas Bushby =

American football player (1911–1983)

- Bushby from 1934 Kansas State yearbook

Profile
- Positions: Halfback, Quarterback

Personal information
- Born: December 30, 1911; Munden, Kansas
- Died: October 23, 1983 (aged 71); Northridge, Los Angeles, California

Career information
- College: Kansas State

Career history
- 1934: Cincinnati "Football" Reds
- 1935: Philadelphia Eagles
- 1936–1938: Salinas Iceberg Packers

Thomas Bateman Bushby (December 30, 1911 – October 23, 1983) was a professional football player for the Cincinnati "Football" Reds in 1934 and the Philadelphia Eagles in 1935. After playing for the Eagles, he played from 1936 to 1938 for the Salinas Iceberg Packers, a professional league team in Salinas, California.

== Biography ==
Bushby was born in Munden, Kansas and played football at Kansas State University under Bo McMillin.
