= Union Township, Republic County, Kansas =

Township in Republic County, Kansas, U.S.

Union Township
- Township
- Location within Republic County
- Coordinates: 39.873°N 97.772°W
- Country: United States
- State: Kansas
- County: Republic
- Established: 1871

Government
  - District 2 County Commissioner: Tim Eitzmann

Area
  - Total: 35.913 sq mi (93.01 km^{2})
  - Land: 35.828 sq mi (92.79 km^{2})
  - Water: 0.085 sq mi (0.22 km^{2}) 0.24%

Population (2020)
  - Total: 41
  - Density: 1.1/sq mi (0.44/km^{2})
- Time zone: UTC-6 (CST)
  - Summer (DST): UTC-5 (CDT)
- Area code: 785
- GNIS feature ID: 472593

Union Township is a township in Republic County, Kansas, United States. As of the 2020 census, its population was 41.

== History ==
Union Township was organized in 1871.

== Geography ==
Union Township covers an area of 35.913 square miles (93.01 square kilometers). The Republican River flows through it.

=== Adjacent townships ===
Washington Township, Republic County
Big Bend Township, Republic County	northwest	north	northeast	Liberty Township, Republic County
White Rock Township, Republic County	west	self	east	Freedom Township, Republic County
Courtland Township, Republic County	southwest	south	southeast	Belleville Township, Republic County
Scandia Township, Republic County
