= Kackley, Kansas =

Unincorporated community in Republic County, Kansas

- Unincorporated community
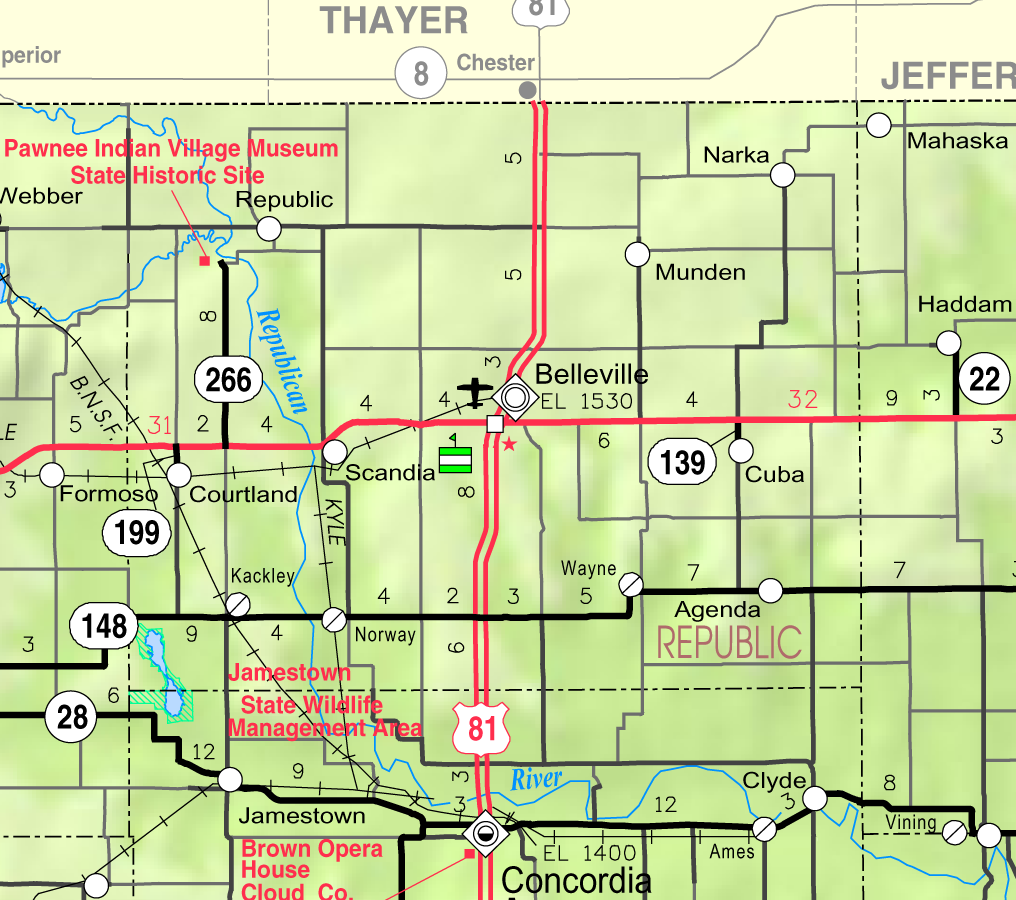
- KDOT map of Republic County (legend)

- Location within Kansas Location within the United States
- Coordinates: 39°42′00″N 97°51′11″W
- Country: United States
- State: Kansas
- County: Republic
- Elevation: 1,509 ft (460 m)
- Time zone: UTC-6 (CST)
  - Summer (DST): UTC-5 (CDT)
- Area code: 785
- FIPS code: 20-35800
- GNIS ID: 473080

Kackley is an unincorporated community in Republic County, Kansas, United States. It is located southeast of Courtland at Co Rd 5 and K-148 highway.

== History ==
In 1887, Atchison, Topeka and Santa Fe Railway built a branch line from Neva (three miles west of Strong City) through Kackley to Superior, Nebraska. In 1996, the Atchison, Topeka and Santa Fe Railway merged with Burlington Northern Railroad and renamed to the current BNSF Railway. Most locals still refer to this railroad as the "Santa Fe".

The town was once a trade center and was considered a "booming" town in the late 19th and early 20th centuries. At its peak, the population was 200, but by 2007 had dwindled to 13. It was named for Joe Kackley, the original land owner.

A post office was opened in Kackley in 1888, and remained in operation until it was discontinued in 1968.

Today, Kackley has a grain elevator and a mechanics shop.

== Education ==
The community is served by Pike Valley USD 426 public school district.

== Media ==
Between 1893 and 1894, four newspapers were published in Kackley. They were:

- Evangelistic War Cry, 1893–1894
- Herald Of Pentecost, 1894
- Kackley Leader, 1893–1894
- Western Record, 1893
