= Isaac O. Savage =

American politician (1833–1908)

Isaac O. Savage (September 30, 1833 – April 9, 1908) was an early writer of the history of Republic County, Kansas. He was active in the community as a local politician and later served as a state senator in the Kansas legislature.

Savage was born in Moravia, New York on September 30, 1833. In 1848 and 1849 he completed academic coursework at Moravia academy. He then emigrated to Fairfield, Michigan to teach school until 1862.

In 1862 he was mustered in as second lieutenant and was assigned to Co. I, 18th regiment, Michigan Volunteer Infantry, in which he served as second lieutenant until November 24, 1862, when he was promoted to first lieutenant of the same company. He received final discharge at Jackson, Michigan, July 11, 1865.

Savage moved to Belleville, Kansas on January 6, 1871. He was elected county treasurer that year. He later was elected a member of the state board of agriculture in 1874, which he held for twelve years.

Savage was elected state senator for the 33rd district of Kansas in November 1876 on the Independent Republican ticket.

In 1901, he completed his work A history of Republic County, Kansas : embracing a full and complete account of all the leading events in its history, from its first settlement down to June 1, '01, considered to be an important work on the history of the county from the early 1800s until its publication in 1901.
