= Jefferson Township, Republic County, Kansas =

Township in Republic County, Kansas

Jefferson Township
- Township
- Location within Republic County
- Coordinates: 39.7744°N 97.5364°W
- Country: United States
- State: Kansas
- County: Republic
- Established: 1872

Government
  - District 1 County Commissioner: Edwin G. Splichal

Area
  - Total: 36.617 sq mi (94.84 km^{2})
  - Land: 36.548 sq mi (94.66 km^{2})
  - Water: 0.069 sq mi (0.18 km^{2}) 0.19%

Population (2020)
  - Total: 83
  - Density: 2.3/sq mi (0.88/km^{2})
- Time zone: UTC-6 (CST)
  - Summer (DST): UTC-5 (CDT)
- Area code: 785
- GNIS feature ID: 472843

Jefferson Township is a township in Republic County, Kansas, United States. As of the 2020 census, its population was 83.

== History ==
Jefferson Township was organized in 1872. It was organized from part of Farmington Township.

== Geography ==
Jefferson Township covers an area of 36.617 square miles (94.84 square kilometers).

=== Adjacent townships ===
Fairview Township, Republic County
Freedom Township, Republic County	northwest	north	northeast	Farmington Township, Republic County
Belleville Township, Republic County	west	self	east	Richland Township, Republic County
Lincoln Township, Republic County	southwest	south	southeast	Elk Creek Township, Republic County
Grant Township, Republic County

== Transportation ==
=== Major highways ===
- US-36
