= Courtland Township, Kansas =

Township in Kansas, United States

Courtland Township
- Township
- Location within Republic County
- Coordinates: 39.79°N 97.88°W
- Country: United States
- State: Kansas
- County: Republic
- Established: 1872

Government
  - District 2 County Commissioner: Tim Eitzmann

Area
  - Total: 36.178 sq mi (93.70 km^{2})
  - Land: 36.144 sq mi (93.61 km^{2})
  - Water: 0.034 sq mi (0.088 km^{2}) 0.09%

Population (2020)
  - Total: 388
  - Density: 10.7/sq mi (4.14/km^{2})
- Time zone: UTC-6 (CST)
  - Summer (DST): UTC-5 (CDT)
- Area code: 785
- GNIS feature ID: 472828

Courtland Township, also spelled Cortland Township, is a township in Republic County, Kansas, United States. As of the 2020 census, its population was 388.

== History ==
Courtland Township was organized in 1872. The first settler in what was to become the township was C. A. Holmstrom, who settled there in 1869. The township was originally going to be called "Soldier Township" since many early settlers were soldiers.

== Geography ==
Courtland Township covers an area of 36.178 square miles (93.70 square kilometers).

=== Communities ===
- Courtland

=== Adjacent townships ===
White Rock Township, Republic County
Sinclair Township, Jewell County	northwest	north	northeast	Union Township, Republic County
Grant Township, Jewell County	west	self	east	Scandia Township, Republic County
Vicksburg Township, Jewell County	southwest	south	southeast	Norway Township, Republic County
Beaver Township, Republic County

== Transportation ==
=== Major highways ===
- US-36
- K-266
