= Belleville Township, Republic County, Kansas =

Township in Republic County, Kansas, U.S.

Belleville Township
- Township
- Location within Republic County
- Coordinates: 39.7789°N 97.6519°W
- Country: United States
- State: Kansas
- County: Republic
- Established: 1871

Government
  - District 3 County Commissioner: Doug Jackson

Area
  - Total: 34.249 sq mi (88.70 km^{2})
  - Land: 34.18 sq mi (88.5 km^{2})
  - Water: 0.069 sq mi (0.18 km^{2}) 0.20%

Population (2020)
  - Total: 188
  - Density: 5.50/sq mi (2.12/km^{2})
- Time zone: UTC-6 (CST)
  - Summer (DST): UTC-5 (CDT)
- Area code: 785
- GNIS feature ID: 485431

Belleville Township is a township in Republic County, Kansas, United States. As of the 2020 census, its population was 188.

== History ==
Belleville Township was organized in 1871. The first settlers in what would become the township was J. C. Reily and his sons, T. C. and W. H. H. Reily, in 1866.

== Geography ==
Belleville Township covers an area of 34.249 square miles (88.70 square kilometers).

=== Adjacent townships ===
Freedom Township, Republic County
Union Township, Republic County	northwest	north	northeast	Fairview Township, Republic County
Scandia Township, Republic County	west	self	east	Jefferson Township, Republic County
Norway Township, Republic County	southwest	south	southeast	Grant Township, Republic County
Lincoln Township, Republic County

== Transportation ==
=== Major highways ===
- US-36
- US-81
