= K-22 (Kansas highway) =

State highway in Kansas, U.S.

K-22
- Deer Road
- K-22 highlighted in red

Route information
- Maintained by KDOT
- Length: 3.087 mi (4.968 km)
- Existed: 1941–present

Major junctions
- South end: US-36 south of Haddam
- North end: 20th Road at Haddam city limits

Location
- Country: United States
- State: Kansas
- Counties: Washington

Highway system
- Kansas State Highway System; Interstate; US; State; Spurs
← K-21	→ K-22

K-22 is a 3.087-mile-long (4.968 km) north–south highway in the U.S. state of Kansas. Located entirely within Washington County, the route runs from U.S. Route 36 (US-36) north to the city limit of Haddam. A previous designation of the route existed in the 1930s from Wichita to Topeka, but was deprecated. The current alignment was designated in the 1940s.

== Route description ==
K-22 begins at an intersection with US-36, known as 17th Road. The route continues south as Deer Road toward Vining. From this intersection, K-22 heads north along Deer Road through a grassland area to an intersection with 18th Road. The route then crosses the Mulberry Creek and runs near it until it reaches Haddam. The roadway then crosses Mill Creek before meeting its northern terminus at 20th Road, on the south city limit of Haddam near an intersection with Logan Street. Deer Road continues north toward the Nebraska state line, but does not cross it.

K-22 is maintained by the Kansas Department of Transportation (KDOT), who is responsible for constructing and maintaining highways in the state. As part of this role, KDOT regularly surveys traffic on their highways. These surveys are most often presented in the form of annual average daily traffic, which is the number of vehicles that use a highway during an average day of the year. In 2010, KDOT calculated that a total of 205 vehicles used the road daily, including 45 trucks. No part of the highway has been listed as part of the National Highway System, a network of roads important to the nation's defence, mobility, and economy.

== History ==
The first designation for K-22 was established by 1927 and ran from US-54 near Liberal to US-36 near Halford. During this time, most of the route was a dirt road, except for a portion near Garden City, which was paved. This routing was relinquished by 1932. By 1933, a new routing was created, and the road instead began in Wichita, headed east along US-54 to Eureka and north to Emporia. From Emporia, the route turned northeast toward Scranton and north into Topeka. This designation was decommissioned between January and July 1938. The current designation of K-22 was established in 1941. No alignment changes have taken place since then.

== Major intersections ==
The entire route is in Washington County.

Location	mi	km	Destinations	Notes
Grant Township	0.000	0.000	US-36 (17th Road) – Washington, Belleville	Southern terminus; road continues as Deer Road
Haddam Township	3.087	4.968	20th Road / Logan Street	Northern terminus; road continues as Deer Road
1.000 mi = 1.609 km; 1.000 km = 0.621 mi
