= Republic County, Kansas =

County in Kansas, United States

- County
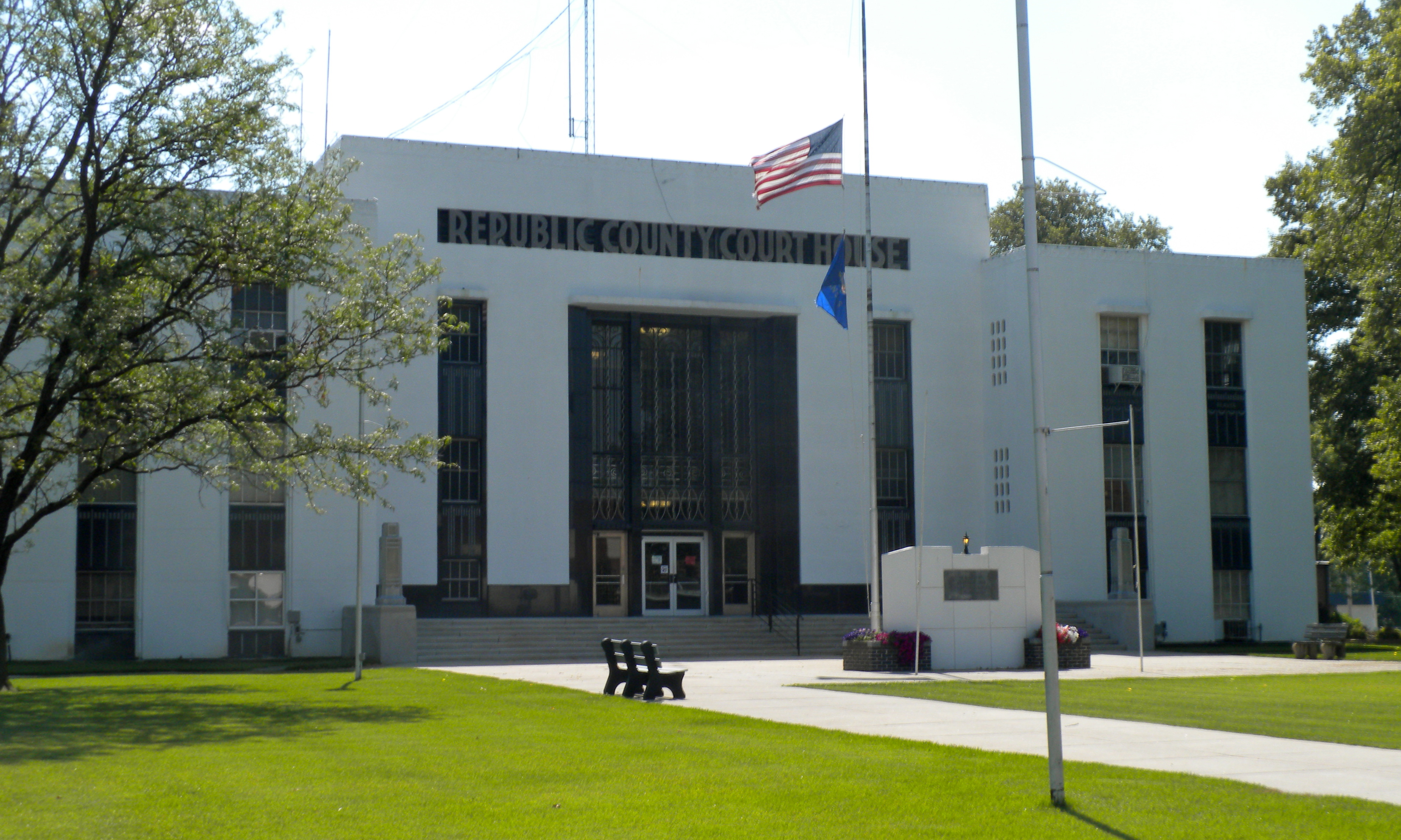
- Republic County Courthouse in Belleville (2010)

- Location within the U.S. state of Kansas
- Coordinates: 39°48′N 97°38′W
- Country: United States
- State: Kansas
- Founded: February 27, 1860
- Named for: Republican River
- Seat: Belleville
- Largest city: Belleville

Area
  - Total: 720.31 sq mi (1,865.6 km^{2})
  - Land: 716.38 sq mi (1,855.4 km^{2})
  - Water: 3.93 sq mi (10.2 km^{2}) 0.55%

Population (2020)
  - Total: 4,674
  - Estimate (2025): 4,640 ▼
  - Density: 6.5/sq mi (2.5/km^{2})
- Time zone: UTC−6 (Central)
  - Summer (DST): UTC−5 (CDT)
- Area code: 785
- Congressional district: 1st
- Website: ks520.cichosting.com/main/

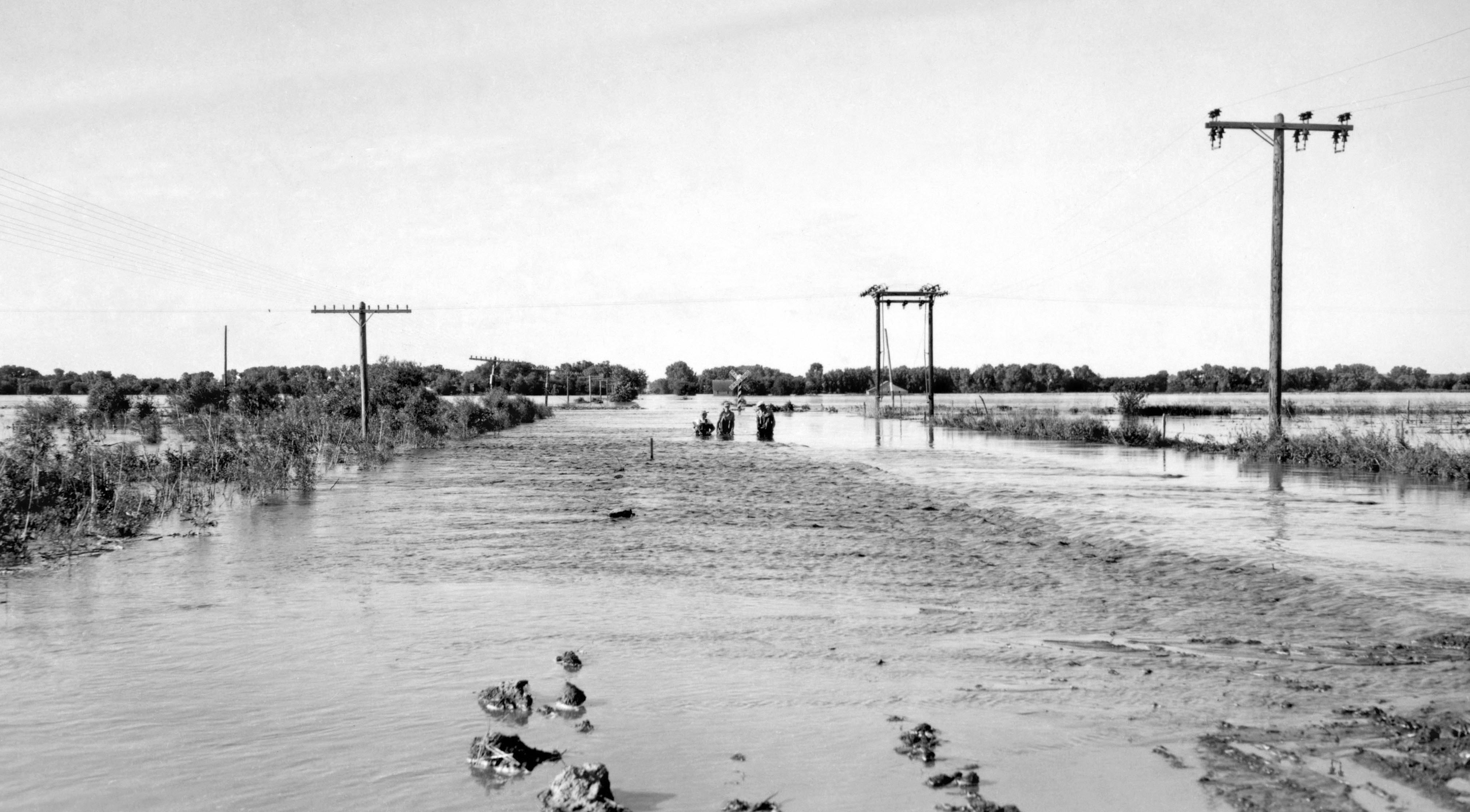
June 24, 1947, flood of the Republican River on the border of Jewell County, Kansas and Republic County, Kansas near Hardy, Nebraska and Webber, Kansas, just south of Nebraska NE-8 on Kansas 1 Rd/CR-1 bridge over the Republican River. The normal flood stage for the river is at the tree line in the foreground.

Republic County is a county located in the state of Kansas, south from the Nebraska state line. Its county seat and largest city is Belleville. As of the 2020 census, the county population was 4,674. The county was named after the Republican River.

== History ==
=== Early history ===
For millennia, the Great Plains of North America were inhabited by nomadic Native Americans. From the 16th to 18th centuries, the Kingdom of France claimed ownership of large parts of North America. In 1762, after the French and Indian War, France ceded New France to Spain, by the Treaty of Fontainebleau.

=== 19th century ===
In 1802, Spain returned most of the land to France, keeping title to about 7,500 square miles. In 1803, the land that included modern day Kansas was acquired by the United States from France as part of the 828,000 square mile Louisiana Purchase.

Prior to the arrival of settlers of European ancestry, the area was inhabited by Indian tribes including the Pawnee, Iowa, and Otoe. One should also consider that other nomadic Indian tribes pursuing the buffalo, including the Arapaho, Cheyenne, Comanche, Kansa, Kiowa, Osage, and Wichita, may have made the area their home at one time or another.

In 1854, under the provisions of the Kansas–Nebraska Act, the Kansas Territory was organized. In 1860, Republic County was established by the Kansas legislature. And, in 1861, Kansas became the 34th U.S. state. The county is named for the Republican River, which enters at the northwestern corner of the county, flowing slightly east of south, and leaving the county about eight miles east of the southwest corner.

Daniel and Conrad Myers were the first settlers of European ancestry, arriving in February 1861. By 1868, Republic County was holding elections. Daniel Myers was elected judge of the Probate court and Conrad Myers to a seat on the County commission. At the election in 1869, the permanent location of the county seat was voted on with the following result: Belleville 59 and New Scandinavia 42, with a couple of votes going to other locations.

Following the Civil War and during the latter half of the 19th century, Belleville and the surrounding area became a destination for European immigrants, notably from Sweden and Bohemia (now Czech Republic).

In 1887, Atchison, Topeka and Santa Fe Railway built a branch line from Neva (3 miles west of Strong City) to Superior, Nebraska. This branch line connected Strong City, Neva, Rockland, Diamond Springs, Burdick, Lost Springs, Jacobs, Hope, Navarre, Enterprise, Abilene, Talmage, Manchester, Longford, Oak Hill, Miltonvale, Aurora, Huscher, Concordia, Kackley, Courtland, Webber, Superior. At some point, the line from Neva to Lost Springs was pulled but the right of way has not been abandoned. This branch line was originally called "Strong City and Superior line" but later the name was shortened to the "Strong City line".

In 1996, the Atchison, Topeka and Santa Fe Railway merged with Burlington Northern Railroad and was renamed the BNSF Railway, although most locals still refer to this railroad as the "Santa Fe".

== Geography ==
According to the 2000 census, the county has a total area of 720.31 square miles (1,865.6 km^{2}), of which 716.38 square miles (1,855.4 km^{2}) (or 99.45%) is land and 3.93 square miles (10.2 km^{2}) (or 0.55%) is water.

=== Adjacent counties ===
- Thayer County, Nebraska (north)
- Jefferson County, Nebraska (northeast)
- Washington County (east)
- Cloud County (south)
- Jewell County (west)
- Nuckolls County, Nebraska (northwest)

== Demographics ==
Historical population
Census	Pop.	Note	%±
1870	1,281		—
1880	14,913		1,064.2%
1890	19,002		27.4%
1900	18,248		−4.0%
1910	17,447		−4.4%
1920	15,855		−9.1%
1930	14,745		−7.0%
1940	13,124		−11.0%
1950	11,478		−12.5%
1960	9,768		−14.9%
1970	8,498		−13.0%
1980	7,569		−10.9%
1990	6,482		−14.4%
2000	5,835		−10.0%
2010	4,980		−14.7%
2020	4,674		−6.1%
2025 (est.)	4,640	▼	−0.7%
U.S. Decennial Census; 1790-1960 1900-1990; 1990-2000 2010-2020

=== Racial and ethnic composition ===
Republic County, Kansas – Racial and ethnic composition Note: the US Census treats Hispanic/Latino as an ethnic category. This table excludes Latinos from the racial categories and assigns them to a separate category. Hispanics/Latinos may be of any race.
Race / Ethnicity (NH = Non-Hispanic)	Pop 1980	Pop 1990	Pop 2000	Pop 2010	Pop 2020	% 1980	% 1990	% 2000	% 2010	% 2020
White alone (NH)	7,527	6,440	5,718	4,851	4,402	99.45%	99.35%	97.99%	97.41%	94.18%
Black or African American alone (NH)	1	3	15	22	15	0.01%	0.05%	0.26%	0.44%	0.32%
Native American or Alaska Native alone (NH)	7	12	11	12	13	0.09%	0.19%	0.19%	0.24%	0.28%
Asian alone (NH)	13	12	7	15	11	0.17%	0.19%	0.12%	0.30%	0.24%
Native Hawaiian or Pacific Islander alone (NH)	x	x	0	0	9	x	x	0.00%	0.00%	0.19%
Other race alone (NH)	6	0	3	1	0	0.08%	0.00%	0.05%	0.02%	0.00%
Mixed race or Multiracial (NH)	x	x	26	26	133	x	x	0.45%	0.52%	2.85%
Hispanic or Latino (any race)	15	15	55	53	91	0.20%	0.23%	0.94%	1.06%	1.95%
Total	7,569	6,482	5,835	4,980	4,674	100.00%	100.00%	100.00%	100.00%	100.00%

=== 2020 census ===
As of the 2020 census, the county had a population of 4,674. The median age was 49.3 years. 21.3% of residents were under the age of 18 and 27.0% of residents were 65 years of age or older. For every 100 females there were 99.1 males, and for every 100 females age 18 and over there were 98.2 males age 18 and over.

The racial makeup of the county was 94.9% White, 0.3% Black or African American, 0.3% American Indian and Alaska Native, 0.2% Asian, 0.2% Native Hawaiian and Pacific Islander, 0.2% from some other race, and 3.8% from two or more races. Hispanic or Latino residents of any race comprised 1.9% of the population.

0.0% of residents lived in urban areas, while 100.0% lived in rural areas.

There were 2,132 households in the county, of which 23.4% had children under the age of 18 living with them and 24.6% had a female householder with no spouse or partner present. About 35.8% of all households were made up of individuals and 18.9% had someone living alone who was 65 years of age or older.

There were 2,676 housing units, of which 20.3% were vacant. Among occupied housing units, 77.7% were owner-occupied and 22.3% were renter-occupied. The homeowner vacancy rate was 3.8% and the rental vacancy rate was 16.8%.

=== 2000 census ===
As of the census of 2000, there were 5,835 people, 2,557 households, and 1,685 families residing in the county. The population density was 8 people per square mile (3.1 people/km^{2}). There were 3,113 housing units at an average density of 4 per square mile (1.5/km^{2}). The racial makeup of the county was 98.56% White, 0.26% Black or African American, 0.21% Native American, 0.19% Asian, 0.33% from other races, and 0.46% from two or more races. 0.94% of the population were Hispanic or Latino of any race. 24.1% were of German, 13.6% Swedish, 12.4% Czech, 9.2% English, 9.0% Irish and 8.6% American ancestry according to Census 2000.

There were 2,557 households, out of which 25.60% had children under the age of 18 living with them, 58.80% were married couples living together, 4.80% had a woman householder with no husband present, and 34.10% were non-families. 31.80% of all households were made up of individuals, and 18.00% had someone living alone who was 65 years of age or older. The average household size was 2.23 and the average family size was 2.80.

In the county, the population was spread out, with 22.30% under the age of 18, 4.50% from 18 to 24, 22.10% from 25 to 44, 25.00% from 45 to 64, and 26.10% who were 65 years of age or older. The median age was 46 years. For every 100 women there were 93.20 men. For every 100 women age 18 and over, there were 90.80 men.

The median income for a household in the county was $30,494, and the median income for a family was $39,215. Men had a median income of $25,260 versus $17,274 for women. The per capita income for the county was $17,433. About 6.00% of families and 9.10% of the population were below the poverty line, including 12.40% of those under age 18 and 8.90% of those age 65 or over.

== Government ==
=== Presidential elections ===
Presidential election results

United States presidential election results for Republic County, Kansas
Year	Republican		Democratic		Third party(ies)	
Year	No.	%	No.	%	No.	%
1888	2,595	63.77%	1,205	29.61%	269	6.61%
1892	2,167	50.03%	0	0.00%	2,164	49.97%
1896	2,033	50.93%	1,910	47.85%	49	1.23%
1900	2,499	55.67%	1,925	42.88%	65	1.45%
1904	2,658	69.51%	941	24.61%	225	5.88%
1908	2,156	51.79%	1,905	45.76%	102	2.45%
1912	895	21.74%	1,816	44.12%	1,405	34.14%
1916	2,882	41.65%	3,806	55.00%	232	3.35%
1920	3,661	67.30%	1,672	30.74%	107	1.97%
1924	3,671	59.96%	1,616	26.40%	835	13.64%
1928	4,324	68.19%	1,956	30.85%	61	0.96%
1932	2,655	38.55%	4,105	59.61%	127	1.84%
1936	3,830	52.61%	3,427	47.07%	23	0.32%
1940	4,450	63.54%	2,511	35.86%	42	0.60%
1944	3,802	66.53%	1,891	33.09%	22	0.38%
1948	3,375	60.42%	2,109	37.76%	102	1.83%
1952	4,573	76.72%	1,358	22.78%	30	0.50%
1956	3,621	68.76%	1,613	30.63%	32	0.61%
1960	3,358	65.62%	1,724	33.69%	35	0.68%
1964	2,414	51.65%	2,222	47.54%	38	0.81%
1968	2,841	66.25%	1,187	27.68%	260	6.06%
1972	2,921	71.80%	1,059	26.03%	88	2.16%
1976	2,294	57.44%	1,617	40.49%	83	2.08%
1980	3,031	73.57%	850	20.63%	239	5.80%
1984	3,009	76.49%	887	22.55%	38	0.97%
1988	2,346	67.76%	1,069	30.88%	47	1.36%
1992	1,767	46.43%	939	24.67%	1,100	28.90%
1996	2,283	69.97%	688	21.08%	292	8.95%
2000	2,239	75.01%	604	20.23%	142	4.76%
2004	2,238	77.47%	607	21.01%	44	1.52%
2008	1,978	74.05%	640	23.96%	53	1.98%
2012	2,134	79.45%	477	17.76%	75	2.79%
2016	2,024	80.03%	375	14.83%	130	5.14%
2020	2,182	82.12%	424	15.96%	51	1.92%
2024	2,001	81.91%	396	16.21%	46	1.88%

Republic County is overwhelmingly Republican. No Democratic presidential candidate has won the county, with the exception of Franklin D. Roosevelt in 1932 and Woodrow Wilson in 1912 and 1916. Since 1996, the Republican candidate has garnered seventy percent of the county's vote. The only Democrat since 1980 to exceed one quarter of the vote was Michael Dukakis in 1988.

=== Laws ===
Republic County was a prohibition ("dry") county until 1986, when the Kansas Constitution was amended, allowing the sale of alcoholic liquor by the individual drink with a 30 percent food sales requirement.

== Education ==
=== Unified school districts ===
- Republic County USD 109
- Pike Valley USD 426

== Communities ==
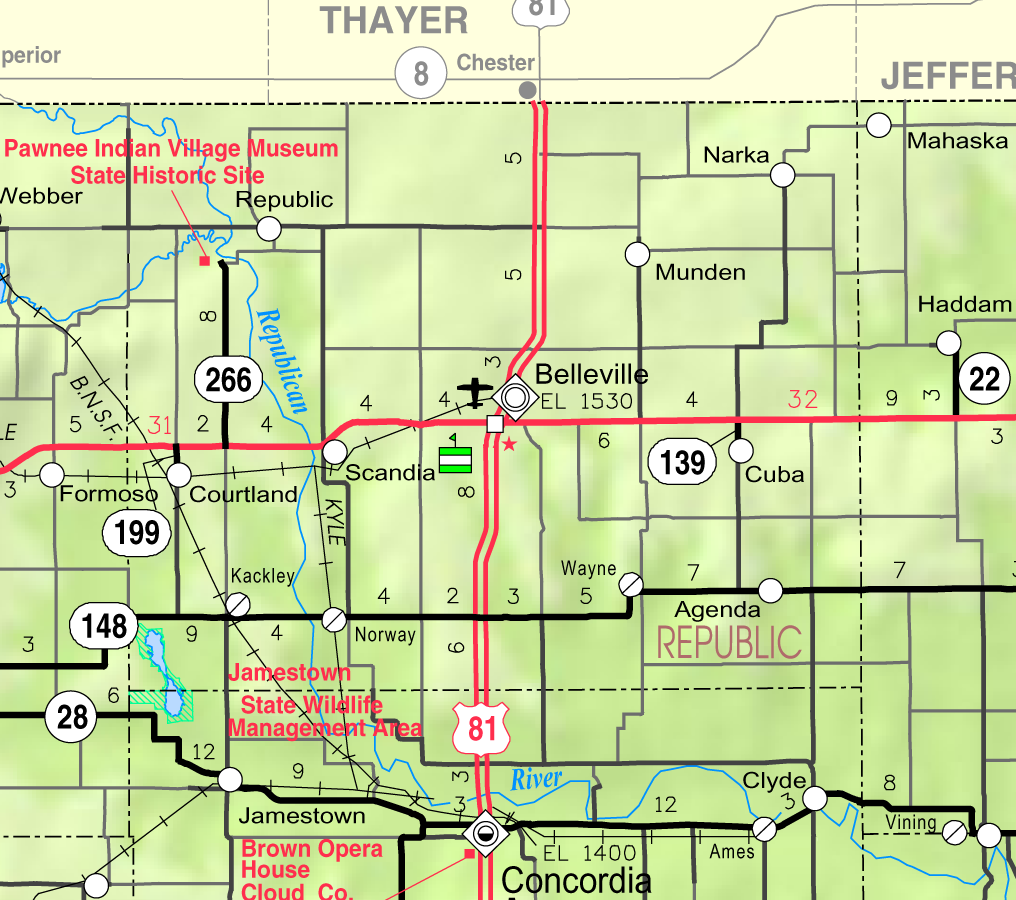
2005 map of Republic County (map legend)

List of townships / incorporated cities / unincorporated communities / extinct former communities within Republic County.

=== Cities ===
- Agenda
- Belleville (county seat)
- Courtland
- Cuba
- Munden
- Narka
- Republic
- Scandia

=== Unincorporated communities ===
† means a Census-Designated Place (CDP) by the United States Census Bureau.

- Harbine
- Kackley
- Norway†
- Rydal
- Talmo
- Wayne

=== Ghost towns ===
- Seapo
- Sherdahl
- White Rock

=== Townships ===
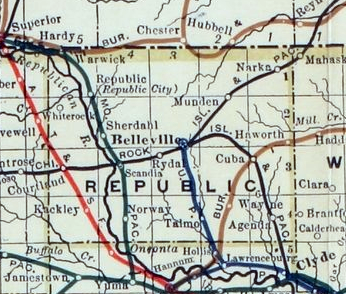
1915 railroad map of Republic County

Republic County is divided into twenty townships. The city of Belleville is considered governmentally independent and is excluded from the census figures for the townships. In the following table, the population center is the largest city (or cities) included in that township's population total, if it is of a significant size.

Sources: 2000 U.S. Gazetteer from the U.S. Census Bureau.
Township	FIPS	Population center	Population	Population density /km^{2} (/sq mi)	Land area km^{2} (sq mi)	Water area km^{2} (sq mi)	Water %	Geographic coordinates
Albion	00900		174	2 (5)	92 (36)	0 (0)	0.12%	39°57′35″N 97°25′29″W
Beaver	05150		137	2 (4)	91 (35)	3 (1)	3.04%	39°42′17″N 97°51′59″W
Belleville	05625		231	3 (7)	89 (34)	0 (0)	0.11%	39°47′14″N 97°38′35″W
Big Bend	06550		242	3 (7)	92 (35)	1 (0)	1.39%	39°57′0″N 97°50′53″W
Courtland	16050		450	5 (12)	94 (36)	0 (0)	0.06%	39°46′56″N 97°52′51″W
Elk Creek	20275		175	2 (5)	94 (36)	0 (0)	0.15%	39°42′16″N 97°25′41″W
Fairview	22575		155	2 (4)	94 (36)	0 (0)	0.49%	39°52′50″N 97°31′54″W
Farmington	23200		81	1 (2)	93 (36)	0 (0)	0.20%	39°52′20″N 97°25′24″W
Freedom	24675		186	2 (5)	90 (35)	0 (0)	0.28%	39°51′31″N 97°38′26″W
Grant	28050		77	1 (2)	95 (37)	0 (0)	0.15%	39°42′5″N 97°32′31″W
Jefferson	35325		107	1 (3)	95 (37)	0 (0)	0.05%	39°47′29″N 97°32′33″W
Liberty	40325		52	1 (1)	93 (36)	0 (0)	0.19%	39°57′2″N 97°38′30″W
Lincoln	41075		103	1 (3)	92 (36)	0 (0)	0.09%	39°41′58″N 97°38′57″W
Norway	51575		163	2 (5)	92 (36)	1 (0)	1.19%	39°42′17″N 97°46′9″W
Richland	59575		318	3 (9)	92 (36)	0 (0)	0.11%	39°47′30″N 97°26′4″W
Rose Creek	61200		170	2 (5)	94 (36)	0 (0)	0.44%	39°57′27″N 97°32′13″W
Scandia	63375		541	6 (15)	92 (36)	1 (0)	1.23%	39°47′28″N 97°46′27″W
Union	72300		51	1 (1)	93 (36)	0 (0)	0.18%	39°52′0″N 97°46′5″W
Washington	75700		95	1 (3)	93 (36)	0 (0)	0.24%	39°57′57″N 97°45′14″W
White Rock	77975		88	1 (2)	92 (36)	1 (0)	1.09%	39°52′34″N 97°51′54″W

== Notable people ==
Arts and entertainment

- Robert Gordon, actor (1895–1971)
- Greta Granstedt, actress
- Harry A. Pollard, silent film actor

Athletes

- Herb Bradley, Major League Baseball player
- Thomas Bushby, player for the Cincinnati "Football" Reds in 1934 and the Philadelphia Eagles in 1935
- Lloyd Cardwell, football player
- Larry Cheney, Major League Baseball player
- Dean Nesmith, professional football player, Olympic athletic trainer
- Ronald Severa, Olympic water polo player, 1956 and 1960
- Anthony Zuzzio, offensive lineman for the Detroit Lions

Clergy

- Allen Wikgren, pastor and Bible scholar
- Richard B. Wilke, former pastor in Scandia, writer of the Disciple ministry series

Journalists

- J. C. Humphrey, founder of the Belleville Telescope newspaper
- A.Q. Miller, namesake of the A.Q. Miller School of Journalism and Mass Communications at Kansas State University.

Medicine

- C. M. Arbuthnot, early physician and pharmacist in the county

Philanthropy

- Elizabeth A. Johnson, Kansas history advocate

Politicians

- Clay Aurand, member of Kansas Legislature
- Charles H. Blosser (1895–1989), namesake of Blosser Municipal Airport in Concordia, Kansas
- Edwin C. Johnson, Governor of Colorado
- William C. Perry, 34th Chief Justice of the Oregon Supreme Court
- Isaac O. Savage, state senator in the Kansas legislature

Settlers

- Ransom Henry Gile, early settler in Scandia
- Thomas Lovewell, founded settlement of White Rock, namesake of Lovewell Reservoir

== See also ==
- National Register of Historic Places listings in Republic County, Kansas

Community information for Kansas

- Kansas locations by per capita income
- List of counties in Kansas
- List of townships in Kansas
- List of cities in Kansas
- List of unincorporated communities in Kansas
- List of ghost towns in Kansas
