= Clifton Township, Washington County, Kansas =

Township in Washington County, Kansas, U.S.

Clifton Township
- Township
- Location within Washington County
- Coordinates: 39.603306°N 97.303107°W
- Country: United States
- State: Kansas
- County: Washington
- Established: 1862

Government
  - District 3 Commissioner: Raleigh Ordoyne

Area
  - Total: 36.125 sq mi (93.56 km^{2})
  - Land: 36.081 sq mi (93.45 km^{2})
  - Water: 0.044 sq mi (0.11 km^{2}) 0.12%

Population (2020)
  - Total: 351
  - Density: 9.73/sq mi (3.76/km^{2})
- Time zone: UTC-6 (CST)
  - Summer (DST): UTC-5 (CDT)
- Area code: 785
- GNIS feature ID: 473110

Clifton Township is a township in Washington County, Kansas, United States. As of the 2020 census, its population was 351.

== History ==
Clifton Township was established in 1862. In 1870, Sherman Township and Strawberry Township were created from parts of Clifton Township. Later, parts of Brantford Township and Sheridan Township were created from parts of Clifton Township, and Strawberry Township would also gain some land from Clifton Township.

== Geography ==
Clifton Township covers an area of 36.125 square miles (93.56 km^{2}), 0.12% of it water. Parsons Creek and its east branch flow through the township.

=== Communities ===
- part of Clifton
- part of Vining

=== Adjacent townships ===
Brantford Township, Washington County
Elk Creek Township, Republic County	northwest	north	northeast	Strawberry Township, Washington County
Elk Township, Cloud County	west	self	east	Sheridan Township, Washington County
		south	southeast	Sherman Township, Clay County
Mulberry Township, Clay County

== Transportation ==
=== Major highways ===
- K-9

== Demographics ==
As of the 2020 census, the township had a population of 351, giving a population density of 9.73 people per square mile (3.76 people/km^{2}). The racial makeup of the township was 97.7% White, 0.3% Native American, 0.6% from some other race, and 1.4% from two or more races. Hispanics or Latinos of any race were 0.9% of the population.

The 2020–2024 American Community Survey estimated that the township contained 142 households and 174 housing units.
