= Hollis, Kansas =

Unincorporated community in Cloud County, Kansas

Coordinates: 39°37′52″N 097°33′09″W

Hollis is an unincorporated community in Lawrence Township, Cloud County, Kansas, United States. It is located northeast of Concordia along 203rd Rd.

== History ==
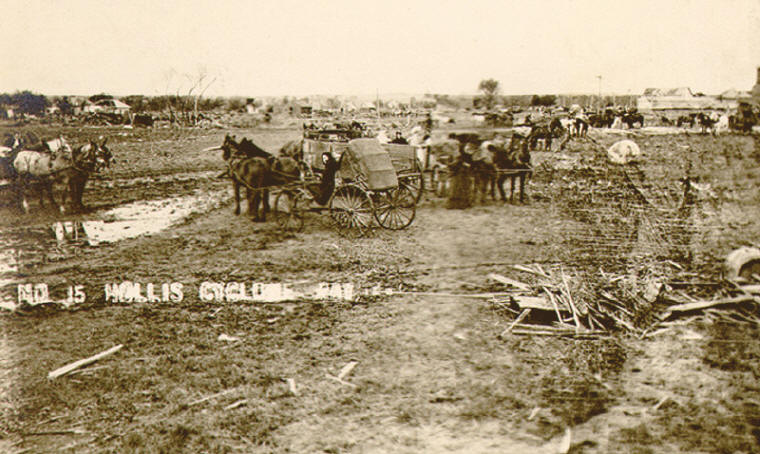
1909 tornado damage

The community was originally named Christie, for W. J. Christie, the original owner of the town site.

Hollis was a shipping point located at the junction of the Chicago, Burlington and Quincy and the Union Pacific Railroads.

A tornado hit Hollis on May 14, 1909, at five o'clock in the evening causing serious damage and killing several people. The town was "swept away" by the tornado Only three buildings in the town were reported to have escaped damage, and total damage estimates in 1909 were over $50,000, equivalent to $1,792,000 in 2025. In 1910, the community reported a population of just 50 people.

== Education ==
The community is served by Concordia USD 333 public school district.
