= Grant Township, Washington County, Kansas =

Township in Washington County, Kansas, U.S.

Grant Township
- Township
- Location within Washington County
- Coordinates: 39.768944°N 97.303278°W
- Country: United States
- State: Kansas
- County: Washington

Government
  - District 3 Commissioner: Raleigh Ordoyne

Area
  - Total: 35.963 sq mi (93.14 km^{2})
  - Land: 35.88 sq mi (92.9 km^{2})
  - Water: 0.083 sq mi (0.21 km^{2}) 0.23%

Population (2020)
  - Total: 57
  - Density: 1.6/sq mi (0.61/km^{2})
- Time zone: UTC-6 (CST)
  - Summer (DST): UTC-5 (CDT)
- Area code: 785
- GNIS feature ID: 472859

Grant Township is a township in Washington County, Kansas, United States. As of the 2020 census, its population was 57.

== History ==
Grant Township was created from parts of Mill Creek Township and Strawberry Township.

== Geography ==
Grant Township covers an area of 35.963 square miles (93.14 km^{2}), 0.23% of it water. Davis Creek and Mulberry Creek flow through it.

=== Adjacent townships ===
Haddam Township, Washington County
Farmington Township, Republic County	northwest	north	northeast	Mill Creek Township, Washington County
Richland Township, Republic County	west	self	east	Coleman Township, Washington County
Elk Creek Township, Republic County	southwest	south	southeast	Strawberry Township, Washington County
Brantford Township, Washington County

== Transportation ==
=== Major highways ===
- US-36
- K-22

== Demographics ==
As of the 2020 census, the township had a population of 57, giving a population density of 1.6 people per square mile (0.62 people/km^{2}). The racial makeup of the township was 100% White. Hispanics or Latinos of any race were 2.4% of the population.

The 2020–2024 American Community Survey estimated that the township contained 12 households and 35 housing units.
