= Republic County USD 109 =

Public school district in Belleville, Kansas

Address
- 1205 19th St. Belleville, Kansas, 66935; United States
- Coordinates: 39°49′22″N 97°37′54″W

District information
- Type: Public
- Grades: K to 12
- Schools: 3

Other information
- Website: usd109.org

Republic County USD 109 is a public unified school district headquartered in Belleville, Kansas, United States. The district includes the communities of Belleville, Agenda, Cuba, Munden, Narka, Republic, Harbine, Talmo, Wayne, and nearby rural areas.

== Schools ==
The school district operates the following schools:

- Republic County High School
- Republic County Middle School
- Belleville East Elementary School

== History ==
In 1945 (after World War II), the School Reorganization Act in Kansas caused the consolidation of thousands of rural school districts in Kansas.

In 1963, the School Unification Act in Kansas caused the further consolidatation of thousands of tiny school districts into hundreds of larger Unified School Districts.

USD 109 was formed in 2006 by the consolidation of Belleville USD 427 and Hillcrest USD 455.

== See also ==
- Kansas State Department of Education
- Kansas State High School Activities Association
- List of high schools in Kansas
- List of unified school districts in Kansas
