= Saltmarsh (surname) =

Saltmarsh is a surname. Notable people with the surname include:

- Ian Saltmarsh (1901–1970), English cricketer
- John Saltmarsh (clergyman) (died 1647), radical clergyman of the English Civil War
- John Saltmarsh (historian) (1908–1974), historian and Fellow of King's College, Cambridge
- Ron Saltmarsh (born 1962), American composer
