= Cuba, Kansas =

City in Republic County, Kansas

- City
- Location within Republic County and Kansas

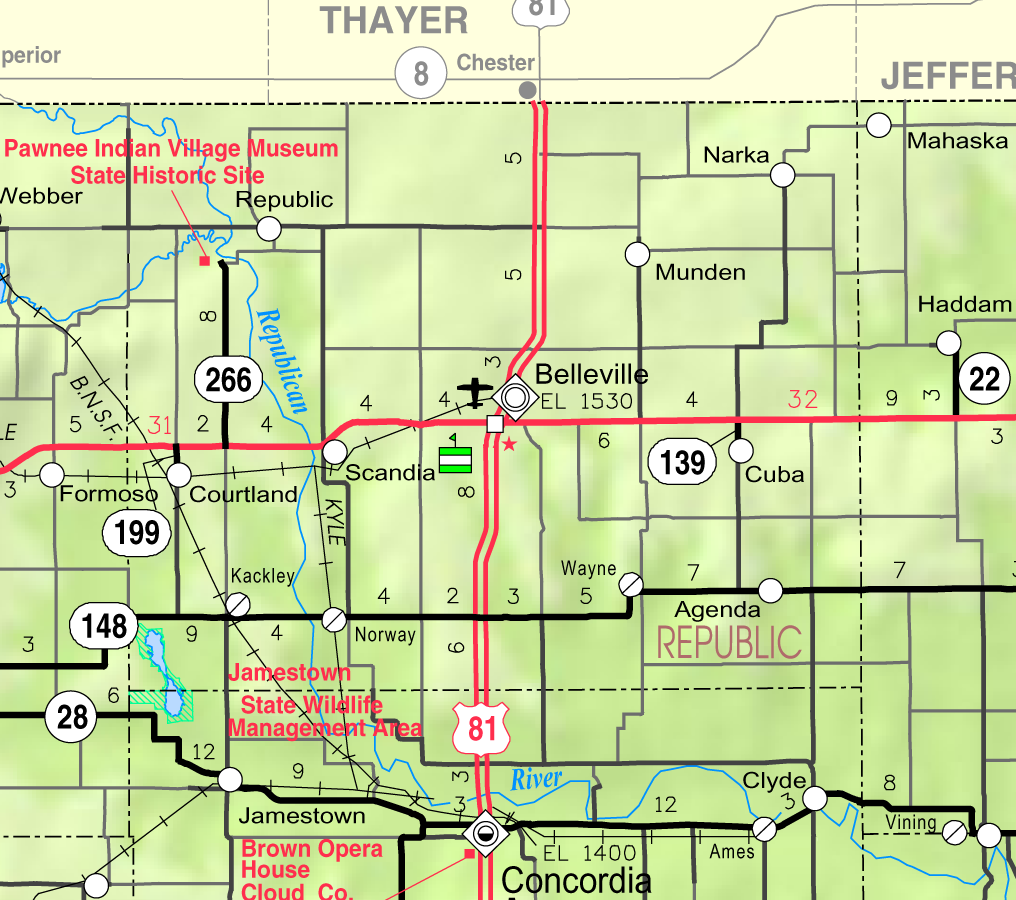
- KDOT map of Republic County (legend)
- Coordinates: 39°48′08″N 97°27′27″W
- Country: United States
- State: Kansas
- County: Republic
- Founded: 1868
- Incorporated: 1885
- Named for: Cuba

Area
  - Total: 0.29 sq mi (0.75 km^{2})
  - Land: 0.29 sq mi (0.75 km^{2})
  - Water: 0 sq mi (0.00 km^{2})
- Elevation: 1,581 ft (482 m)

Population (2020)
  - Total: 140
  - Density: 480/sq mi (190/km^{2})
- Time zone: UTC-6 (CST)
  - Summer (DST): UTC-5 (CDT)
- ZIP Code: 66940
- Area code: 785
- FIPS code: 20-16625
- GNIS ID: 2393691
- Website: cubakansas.com

Cuba is a city in Republic County, Kansas, United States. As of the 2020 census, the population of the city was 140.

== History ==
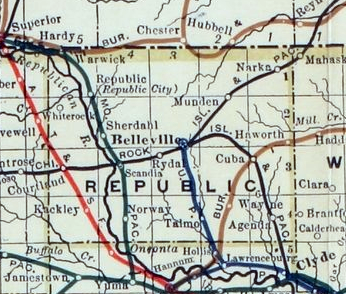
1915 railroad map of Republic County

The community was founded in 1868 by American southerners traveling westward after the American Civil War. The city received its name from one settler who had once lived on the island of Cuba. Other early settlers of Cuba are Czech immigrants from Bohemia who settled in Cuba in the mid-1870s. Originally, the majority of the population of Cuba were of Czech and Austrian descent.

The entire town of Cuba moved to its present location in 1884 in order to be on the railroad that had been built through that region.

The town has received attention due to its small town America nature documented by photographer Jim Richardson. Cuba, Kansas and Jim Richardson were highlighted on the CBS News Sunday Morning show in 1983 and in 2004, as well as the May 2004 issue of National Geographic magazine.

== Geography ==
According to the United States Census Bureau, the city has a total area of 0.31 square miles (0.80 km^{2}), all land.

== Demographics ==
Historical population
Census	Pop.	Note	%±
1890	415		—
1900	445		7.2%
1910	466		4.7%
1920	432		−7.3%
1930	403		−6.7%
1940	363		−9.9%
1950	345		−5.0%
1960	336		−2.6%
1970	290		−13.7%
1980	286		−1.4%
1990	242		−15.4%
2000	231		−4.5%
2010	156		−32.5%
2020	140		−10.3%
U.S. Decennial Census

=== 2020 census ===
The 2020 United States census counted 140 people, 69 households, and 40 families in Cuba. The population density was 486.1 per square mile (187.7/km^{2}). There were 109 housing units at an average density of 378.5 per square mile (146.1/km^{2}). The racial makeup was 95.71% (134) white or European American (95.71% non-Hispanic white), 0.0% (0) black or African-American, 0.0% (0) Native American or Alaska Native, 0.0% (0) Asian, 0.0% (0) Pacific Islander or Native Hawaiian, 0.71% (1) from other races, and 3.57% (5) from two or more races. Hispanic or Latino of any race was 0.71% (1) of the population.

Of the 69 households, 15.9% had children under the age of 18; 50.7% were married couples living together; 33.3% had a female householder with no spouse or partner present. 42.0% of households consisted of individuals and 26.1% had someone living alone who was 65 years of age or older. The average household size was 2.3 and the average family size was 2.9. The percent of those with a bachelor's degree or higher was estimated to be 37.1% of the population.

15.0% of the population was under the age of 18, 3.6% from 18 to 24, 16.4% from 25 to 44, 27.1% from 45 to 64, and 37.9% who were 65 years of age or older. The median age was 59.0 years. For every 100 females, there were 115.4 males. For every 100 females ages 18 and older, there were 133.3 males.

The 2016–2020 5-year American Community Survey estimates show that the median household income was $37,083 (with a margin of error of +/- $17,768) and the median family income was $57,813 (+/- $29,369). Males had a median income of $29,141 (+/- $3,984) versus $34,375 (+/- $21,279) for females. The median income for those above 16 years old was $31,477 (+/- $5,435). Approximately, 6.3% of families and 5.4% of the population were below the poverty line, including 3.7% of those under the age of 18 and 12.1% of those ages 65 or over.

=== 2010 census ===
As of the census of 2010, there were 156 people, 79 households, and 48 families residing in the city. The population density was 503.2 inhabitants per square mile (194.3/km^{2}). There were 131 housing units at an average density of 422.6 per square mile (163.2/km^{2}). The racial makeup of the city was 96.8% White, 1.3% Native American, and 1.9% from two or more races.

There were 79 households, of which 12.7% had children under the age of 18 living with them, 55.7% were married couples living together, 3.8% had a female householder with no husband present, 1.3% had a male householder with no wife present, and 39.2% were non-families. 35.4% of all households were made up of individuals, and 16.5% had someone living alone who was 65 years of age or older. The average household size was 1.97 and the average family size was 2.52.

The median age in the city was 55.8 years. 12.8% of residents were under the age of 18; 5.7% were between the ages of 18 and 24; 11.5% were from 25 to 44; 39.7% were from 45 to 64; and 30.1% were 65 years of age or older. The gender makeup of the city was 51.3% male and 48.7% female.

== Government ==
The Cuba government consists of a mayor and five council members. The council meets once a month.

== Education ==
The community is served by Republic County USD 109 public school district. It was formed in 2006 by the consolidation of Belleville USD 427 and Hillcrest USD 455. The Republic County High School mascot is Republic County Buffaloes.

Hillcrest (Cuba) schools were closed through school unification. The Hillcrest High School mascot was Hillcrest Mustangs.

== Cultural events ==
=== Czech Day ===
The Cuba Booster Club organizes an annual three-day event centered around the town's Rock-A-Thon, in which rocking chairs are continuously rocked by rotating people. Other activities include an auction, the profits of which are used to pay for various community needs, as well as a Czech dinner.
