= Narka, Kansas =

City in Republic County, Kansas

- City
- Location within Republic County and Kansas

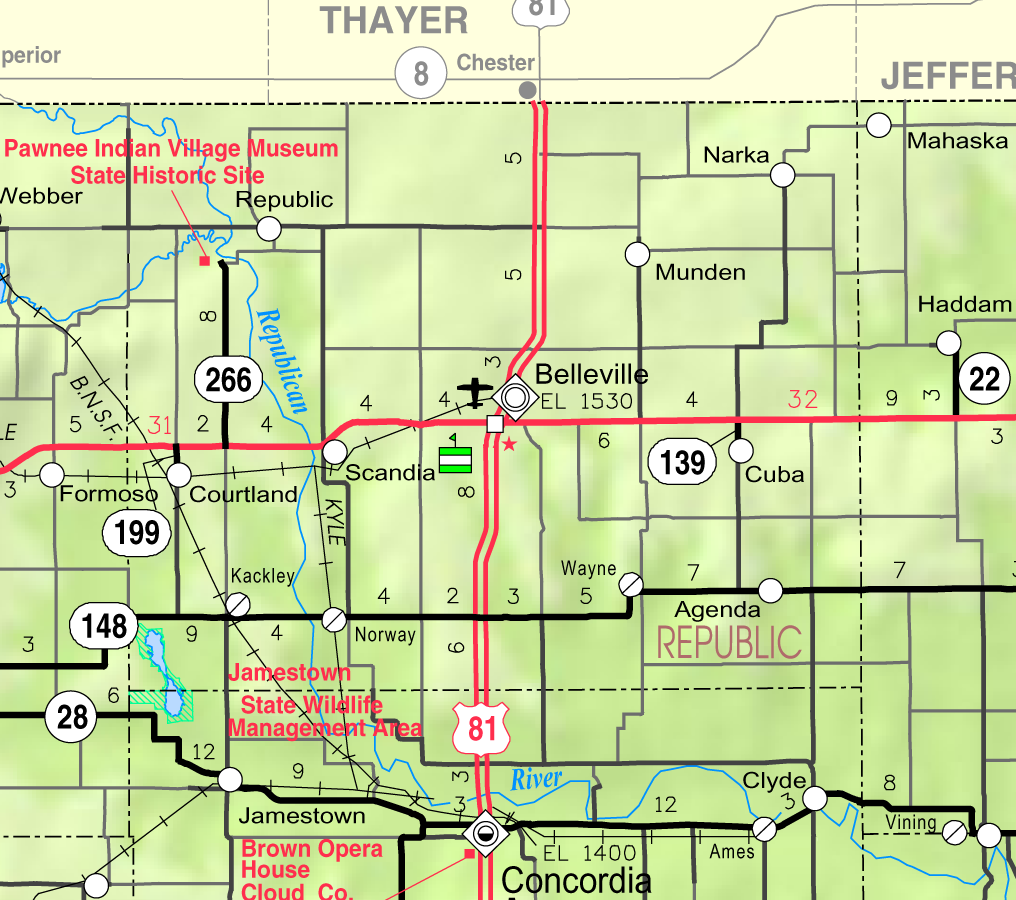
- KDOT map of Republic County (legend)
- Coordinates: 39°57′35″N 97°25′36″W
- Country: United States
- State: Kansas
- County: Republic
- Founded: 1887
- Incorporated: 1899

Area
  - Total: 0.16 sq mi (0.41 km^{2})
  - Land: 0.16 sq mi (0.41 km^{2})
  - Water: 0 sq mi (0.00 km^{2})
- Elevation: 1,585 ft (483 m)

Population (2020)
  - Total: 81
  - Density: 510/sq mi (200/km^{2})
- Time zone: UTC-6 (CST)
  - Summer (DST): UTC-5 (CDT)
- ZIP Code: 66960
- Area code: 785
- FIPS code: 20-49350
- GNIS ID: 2395151

Narka is a city in Republic County, Kansas, United States. As of the 2020 census, the population of the city was 81.

== History ==
Narka was founded in 1887. It was named for the daughter of a railroad employee. The first post office in Narka was established in November 1887. Narka was incorporated as a city in 1894.

== Geography ==
According to the United States Census Bureau, the city has a total area of 0.17 square miles (0.44 km^{2}), all land.

== Demographics ==
Historical population
Census	Pop.	Note	%±
1900	258		—
1910	278		7.8%
1920	207		−25.5%
1930	252		21.7%
1940	193		−23.4%
1950	220		14.0%
1960	166		−24.5%
1970	130		−21.7%
1980	120		−7.7%
1990	113		−5.8%
2000	93		−17.7%
2010	94		1.1%
2020	81		−13.8%
U.S. Decennial Census

=== 2020 census ===
The 2020 United States census counted 81 people, 40 households, and 18 families in Narka. The population density was 506.2 per square mile (195.5/km^{2}). There were 48 housing units at an average density of 300.0 per square mile (115.8/km^{2}). The racial makeup was 96.3% (78) white or European American (96.3% non-Hispanic white), 0.0% (0) black or African-American, 0.0% (0) Native American or Alaska Native, 0.0% (0) Asian, 0.0% (0) Pacific Islander or Native Hawaiian, 0.0% (0) from other races, and 3.7% (3) from two or more races. Hispanic or Latino of any race was 0.0% (0) of the population.

Of the 40 households, 15.0% had children under the age of 18; 27.5% were married couples living together; 35.0% had a female householder with no spouse or partner present. 47.5% of households consisted of individuals and 20.0% had someone living alone who was 65 years of age or older. The average household size was 2.3 and the average family size was 2.8. The percent of those with a bachelor's degree or higher was estimated to be 9.9% of the population.

24.7% of the population was under the age of 18, 4.9% from 18 to 24, 21.0% from 25 to 44, 35.8% from 45 to 64, and 13.6% who were 65 years of age or older. The median age was 41.5 years. For every 100 females, there were 72.3 males. For every 100 females ages 18 and older, there were 69.4 males.

The 2016–2020 5-year American Community Survey estimates show that the median household income was $47,813 (with a margin of error of +/- $17,552) and the median family income was $65,536 (+/- $51,378). Males had a median income of $36,538 (+/- $6,490) versus $23,929 (+/- $13,569) for females. The median income for those above 16 years old was $29,318 (+/- $7,474). Approximately, 13.5% of families and 6.8% of the population were below the poverty line, including 6.5% of those under the age of 18 and 0.0% of those ages 65 or over.

=== 2010 census ===
As of the census of 2010, there were 94 people, 42 households, and 25 families residing in the city. The population density was 552.9 inhabitants per square mile (213.5/km^{2}). There were 52 housing units at an average density of 305.9 per square mile (118.1/km^{2}). The racial makeup of the city was 100.0% White.

There were 42 households, of which 23.8% had children under the age of 18 living with them, 47.6% were married couples living together, 7.1% had a female householder with no husband present, 4.8% had a male householder with no wife present, and 40.5% were non-families. 38.1% of all households were made up of individuals, and 7.1% had someone living alone who was 65 years of age or older. The average household size was 2.24 and the average family size was 3.00.

The median age in the city was 40 years. 24.5% of residents were under the age of 18; 11.7% were between the ages of 18 and 24; 22.3% were from 25 to 44; 30.8% were from 45 to 64; and 10.6% were 65 years of age or older. The gender makeup of the city was 54.3% male and 45.7% female.

== Education ==
The community is served by Republic County USD 109 public school district. It was formed in 2006 by the consolidation of Belleville USD 427 and Hillcrest USD 455. The Republic County High School mascot is Republic County Buffaloes.

Narka schools were closed through school unification. The Narka High School mascot was Narka Wildcats.
