= Lawrence Township, Cloud County, Kansas =

Lawrence Township
- Township
- Location in Cloud County
- Coordinates: 39°38′15″N 097°32′31″W
- Country: United States
- State: Kansas
- County: Cloud

Area
  - Total: 36.46 sq mi (94.44 km^{2})
  - Land: 36.02 sq mi (93.29 km^{2})
  - Water: 0.44 sq mi (1.15 km^{2}) 1.22%
- Elevation: 1,371 ft (418 m)

Population (2020)
  - Total: 128
  - Density: 3.55/sq mi (1.37/km^{2})
- GNIS feature ID: 0473089

Lawrence Township is a township in Cloud County, Kansas, United States. As of the 2020 census, its population was 128.

== History ==
Lawrence Township was organized in 1872. It was named for L. D. Lawrence, a pioneer settler.

== Geography ==
Lawrence Township covers an area of 36.46 square miles (94.4 km^{2}) and contains no incorporated settlements. The township contains the unincorporated settlement of Hollis. According to the USGS, it contains two cemeteries: Hollis and Walnut Grove.

The streams of Little Upton Creek, Oak Creek, Plum Creek, Salt Creek, Upton Creek and West Creek run through this township.
