= Sibley Township, Kansas =

Sibley Township
- Township
- Location in Cloud County
- Coordinates: 39°36′40″N 097°40′01″W
- Country: United States
- State: Kansas
- County: Cloud

Area
  - Total: 35.88 sq mi (92.93 km^{2})
  - Land: 35.36 sq mi (91.59 km^{2})
  - Water: 0.52 sq mi (1.34 km^{2}) 1.44%
- Elevation: 1,375 ft (419 m)

Population (2020)
  - Total: 149
  - Density: 4.21/sq mi (1.63/km^{2})
- GNIS feature ID: 0485433

Sibley Township is a township in Cloud County, Kansas, United States. As of the 2020 census, its population was 149.

== Geography ==
Sibley Township covers an area of 35.88 square miles (92.9 km^{2}) and contains no incorporated settlements. According to the USGS, it contains three cemeteries: Gottland, Saron and Sibley.

The streams of Buffalo Creek, Grave Creek, Hay Creek and Lost Creek run through this township.
