= Republic, Kansas =

City in Republic County, Kansas, United States

- City
- Location within Republic County and Kansas

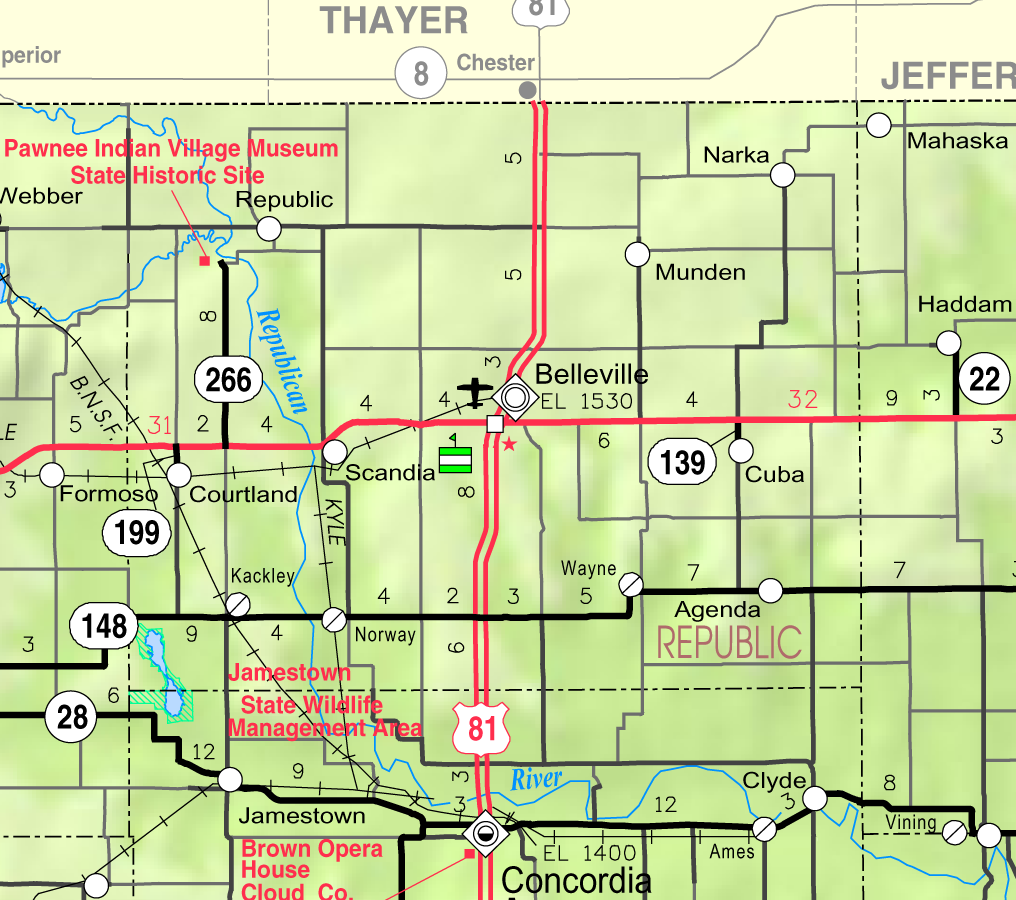
- KDOT map of Republic County (legend)
- Coordinates: 39°55′26″N 97°49′28″W
- Country: United States
- State: Kansas
- County: Republic
- Founded: 1871
- Incorporated: 1885
- Named for: Republic County

Area
  - Total: 0.23 sq mi (0.60 km^{2})
  - Land: 0.23 sq mi (0.60 km^{2})
  - Water: 0 sq mi (0.00 km^{2})
- Elevation: 1,493 ft (455 m)

Population (2020)
  - Total: 82
  - Density: 350/sq mi (140/km^{2})
- Time zone: UTC-6 (CST)
  - Summer (DST): UTC-5 (CDT)
- ZIP Code: 66964
- Area code: 785
- FIPS code: 20-59000
- GNIS ID: 2396353

Republic is a city in Republic County, Kansas, United States. As of the 2020 census, the population of the city was 82.

== History ==
Republic was founded in 1871. It was named from Republic County.

== Geography ==
According to the United States Census Bureau, the city has a total area of 0.26 square miles (0.67 km^{2}), all land.

== Demographics ==
Historical population
Census	Pop.	Note	%±
1880	50		—
1890	228		356.0%
1900	241		5.7%
1910	450		86.7%
1920	442		−1.8%
1930	396		−10.4%
1940	376		−5.1%
1950	360		−4.3%
1960	333		−7.5%
1970	243		−27.0%
1980	223		−8.2%
1990	177		−20.6%
2000	161		−9.0%
2010	116		−28.0%
2020	82		−29.3%
U.S. Decennial Census

=== 2020 census ===
The 2020 United States census counted 82 people, 49 households, and 30 families in Republic. The population density was 351.9 per square mile (135.9/km^{2}). There were 79 housing units at an average density of 339.1 per square mile (130.9/km^{2}). The racial makeup was 92.68% (76) white or European American (91.46% non-Hispanic white), 1.22% (1) black or African-American, 0.0% (0) Native American or Alaska Native, 0.0% (0) Asian, 0.0% (0) Pacific Islander or Native Hawaiian, 0.0% (0) from other races, and 6.1% (5) from two or more races. Hispanic or Latino of any race was 1.22% (1) of the population.

Of the 49 households, 26.5% had children under the age of 18; 49.0% were married couples living together; 22.4% had a female householder with no spouse or partner present. 32.7% of households consisted of individuals and 18.4% had someone living alone who was 65 years of age or older. The average household size was 1.7 and the average family size was 1.9. The percent of those with a bachelor's degree or higher was estimated to be 7.3% of the population.

9.8% of the population was under the age of 18, 7.3% from 18 to 24, 20.7% from 25 to 44, 37.8% from 45 to 64, and 24.4% who were 65 years of age or older. The median age was 54.5 years. For every 100 females, there were 86.4 males. For every 100 females ages 18 and older, there were 85.0 males.

The 2016–2020 5-year American Community Survey estimates show that the median household income was $49,375 (with a margin of error of +/- $23,073) and the median family income was $60,543 (+/- $5,678). Males had a median income of $27,250 (+/- $22,010) versus $20,000 (+/- $5,199) for females. The median income for those above 16 years old was $24,792 (+/- $4,719). Approximately, 10.4% of families and 10.3% of the population were below the poverty line, including 0.0% of those under the age of 18 and 0.0% of those ages 65 or over.

=== 2010 census ===
As of the census of 2010, there were 116 people, 61 households, and 34 families living in the city. The population density was 446.2 inhabitants per square mile (172.3/km^{2}). There were 95 housing units at an average density of 365.4 per square mile (141.1/km^{2}). The racial makeup of the city was 95.7% White, 3.4% Native American, and 0.9% from two or more races.

There were 61 households, of which 14.8% had children under the age of 18 living with them, 47.5% were married couples living together, 8.2% had a female householder with no husband present, and 44.3% were non-families. 39.3% of all households were made up of individuals, and 16.4% had someone living alone who was 65 years of age or older. The average household size was 1.90 and the average family size was 2.47.

The median age in the city was 52.5 years. 14.7% of residents were under the age of 18; 4.2% were between the ages of 18 and 24; 16.4% were from 25 to 44; 43.1% were from 45 to 64, and 21.6% were 65 years of age or older. The gender makeup of the city was 50.0% male and 50.0% female.

== Points of interest ==
The Pawnee Indian Museum State Historic Site is an archaeological site and museum, located near Republic. It is listed in the National Register of Historic Places under the name Pawnee Indian Village Site. To archaeologists, the site is known as 14RP1.

== Education ==
The community is served by Republic County USD 109 public school district. It was formed in 2006 by the consolidation of Belleville USD 427 and Hillcrest USD 455. The Republic County High School mascot is Republic County Buffaloes.

Republic schools were closed through school unification. The Republic Wildcats won the Kansas State High School boys class BB Indoor Track & Field championship in 1965.
