= Courtland, Kansas =

City in Republic County, Kansas

- City
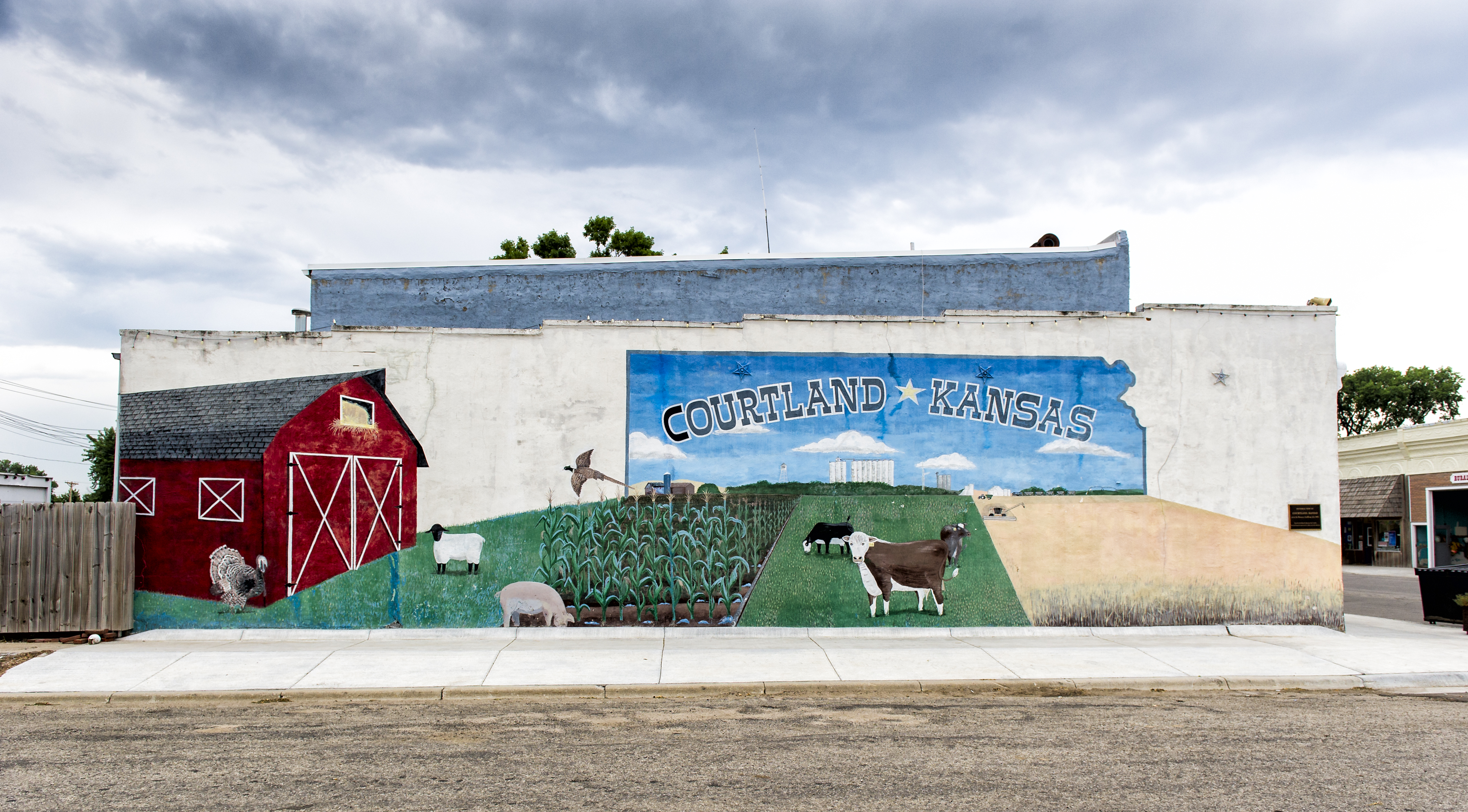
- Courtland Mural (2014)

- Location within Republic County and Kansas

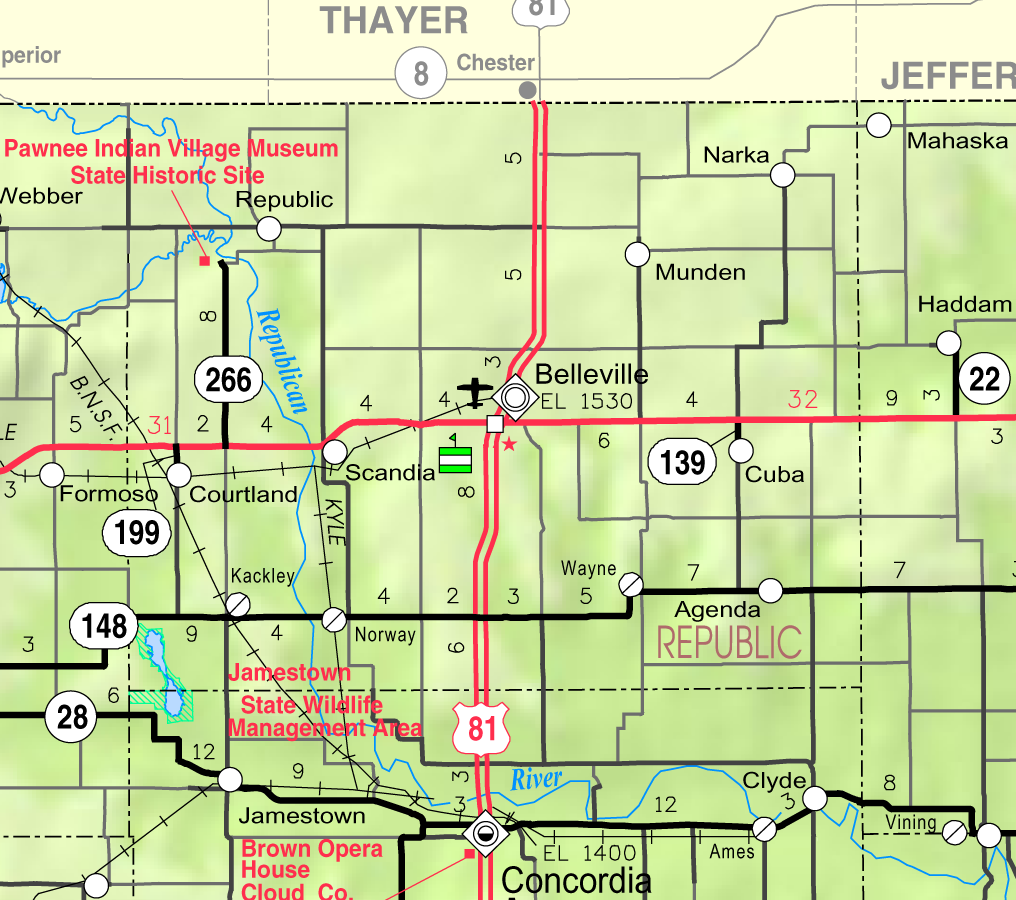
- KDOT map of Republic County (legend)
- Coordinates: 39°47′00″N 97°53′46″W
- Country: United States
- State: Kansas
- County: Republic
- Founded: 1885
- Incorporated: 1892
- Named for: Cortland, New York

Area
  - Total: 0.27 sq mi (0.70 km^{2})
  - Land: 0.27 sq mi (0.70 km^{2})
  - Water: 0 sq mi (0.00 km^{2})
- Elevation: 1,503 ft (458 m)

Population (2020)
  - Total: 294
  - Density: 1,100/sq mi (420/km^{2})
- Time zone: UTC-6 (CST)
  - Summer (DST): UTC-5 (CDT)
- ZIP Code: 66939
- Area code: 785
- FIPS code: 20-16025
- GNIS ID: 2393655
- Website: City website

Courtland is a city in Republic County, Kansas, United States. As of the 2020 census, the population of the city was 294.

== History ==
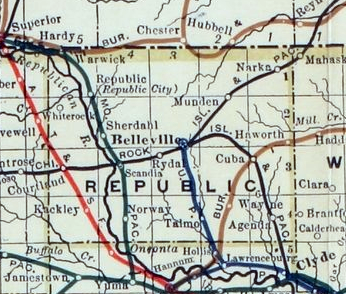
1915 railroad map of Republic County

The first settlement was made at Courtland in 1885. A post office was opened in Prospect (an extinct town) in 1878, but it was moved to Courtland in 1888. The community was named after Cortland, New York, but may also be named for Courtland, a city near Mankato, Minnesota, which shares the same spelling.

In 1887, Atchison, Topeka and Santa Fe Railway built a branch line from Neva (four miles west of Strong City) through Courtland to Superior, Nebraska. In 1996, the Atchison, Topeka and Santa Fe Railway merged with Burlington Northern Railroad and renamed to the current BNSF Railway. Most locals still refer to this railroad as the "Santa Fe".

Courtland was incorporated as a city in 1892.

== Geography ==
According to the United States Census Bureau, the city has a total area of 0.27 square miles (0.70 km^{2}), all land.

== Demographics ==
Historical population
Census	Pop.	Note	%±
1890	267		—
1900	286		7.1%
1910	454		58.7%
1920	411		−9.5%
1930	430		4.6%
1940	383		−10.9%
1950	367		−4.2%
1960	384		4.6%
1970	403		4.9%
1980	377		−6.5%
1990	343		−9.0%
2000	334		−2.6%
2010	285		−14.7%
2020	294		3.2%
U.S. Decennial Census

=== 2020 census ===
The 2020 United States census counted 294 people, 116 households, and 64 families in Courtland. The population density was 1,092.9 per square mile (422.0/km^{2}). There were 149 housing units at an average density of 553.9 per square mile (213.9/km^{2}). The racial makeup was 93.2% (274) white or European American (92.52% non-Hispanic white), 0.34% (1) black or African-American, 0.0% (0) Native American or Alaska Native, 0.0% (0) Asian, 0.34% (1) Pacific Islander or Native Hawaiian, 0.0% (0) from other races, and 6.12% (18) from two or more races. Hispanic or Latino of any race was 2.04% (6) of the population.

Of the 116 households, 29.3% had children under the age of 18; 47.4% were married couples living together; 20.7% had a female householder with no spouse or partner present. 36.2% of households consisted of individuals and 14.7% had someone living alone who was 65 years of age or older. The average household size was 2.4 and the average family size was 3.1. The percent of those with a bachelor's degree or higher was estimated to be 17.3% of the population.

27.2% of the population was under the age of 18, 5.8% from 18 to 24, 25.9% from 25 to 44, 21.4% from 45 to 64, and 19.7% who were 65 years of age or older. The median age was 39.2 years. For every 100 females, there were 97.3 males. For every 100 females ages 18 and older, there were 94.5 males.

The 2016–2020 5-year American Community Survey estimates show that the median household income was $49,297 (with a margin of error of +/- $7,268) and the median family income was $66,563 (+/- $4,397). Males had a median income of $35,625 (+/- $2,748) versus $30,469 (+/- $19,094) for females. The median income for those above 16 years old was $31,389 (+/- $1,963). Approximately, 2.7% of families and 4.1% of the population were below the poverty line, including 0.0% of those under the age of 18 and 14.9% of those ages 65 or over.

=== 2010 census ===
As of the census of 2010, there were 285 people, 137 households, and 82 families living in the city. The population density was 1,055.6 inhabitants per square mile (407.6/km^{2}). There were 161 housing units at an average density of 596.3 per square mile (230.2/km^{2}). The racial makeup of the city was 98.9% White, 0.7% African American, and 0.4% Asian. Hispanic or Latino of any race were 0.4% of the population.

There were 137 households, of which 26.3% had children under the age of 18 living with them, 46.0% were married couples living together, 7.3% had a female householder with no husband present, 6.6% had a male householder with no wife present, and 40.1% were non-families. 34.3% of all households were made up of individuals, and 14.6% had someone living alone who was 65 years of age or older. The average household size was 2.08 and the average family size was 2.66.

The median age in the city was 46.1 years. 22.1% of residents were under the age of 18; 6% were between the ages of 18 and 24; 19.7% were from 25 to 44; 29.8% were from 45 to 64; and 22.5% were 65 years of age or older. The gender makeup of the city was 52.6% male and 47.4% female.

== Area events ==
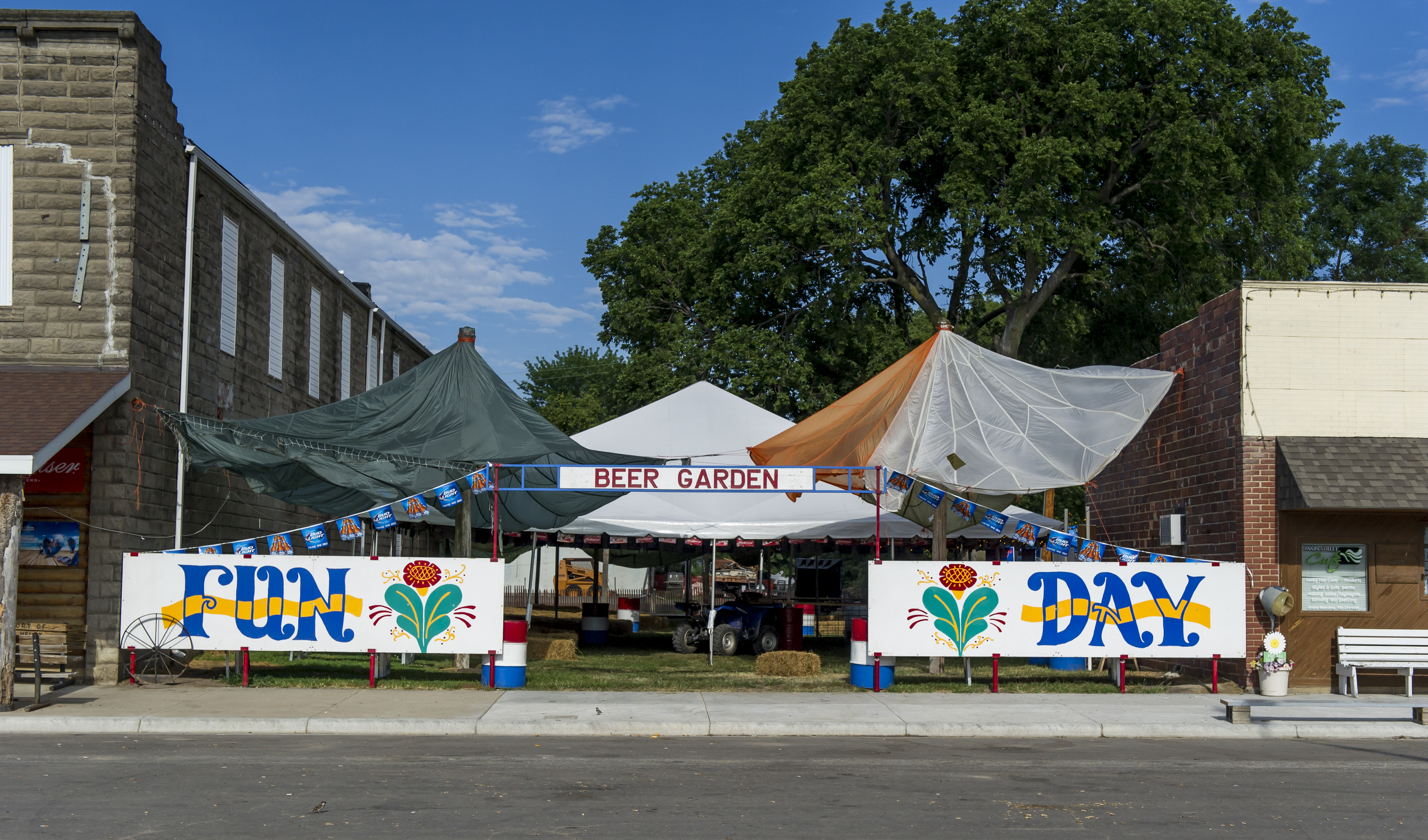
Courtland Fun Day (2014)

Courtland Fun Day - annual summer celebration held the last Saturday in July since 1964.

== Education ==
The community is served by Pike Valley USD 426 public school district. School unification consolidated Courtland and Scandia schools forming the district. The Pike Valley High School mascot is Panthers.

Prior to school unification, the Courtland High School mascot was Courtland Tigers. The Courtland Tigers won the Kansas State High School boys class B Indoor Track & Field championship in 1961.
