= Elk Township, Cloud County, Kansas =

Elk Township
- Township
- Location in Cloud County
- Coordinates: 39°36′32″N 097°25′06″W
- Country: United States
- State: Kansas
- County: Cloud

Area
  - Total: 28.24 sq mi (73.15 km^{2})
  - Land: 27.94 sq mi (72.36 km^{2})
  - Water: 0.31 sq mi (0.79 km^{2}) 1.08%
- Elevation: 1,332 ft (406 m)

Population (2020)
  - Total: 785
  - Density: 28.1/sq mi (10.8/km^{2})
- GNIS feature ID: 0473105

Elk Township is a township in Cloud County, Kansas, United States. As of the 2020 census, its population was 785.

== Geography ==
Elk Township covers an area of 28.24 square miles (73.1 km^{2}) and contains one incorporated settlement, Clyde. According to the USGS, it contains two cemeteries: Mount Calvary and Mount Hope.

The streams of Elk Creek and West Fork Elk Creek run through this township.
