= Munden, Kansas =

City in Republic County, Kansas

- City
- Location within Republic County and Kansas

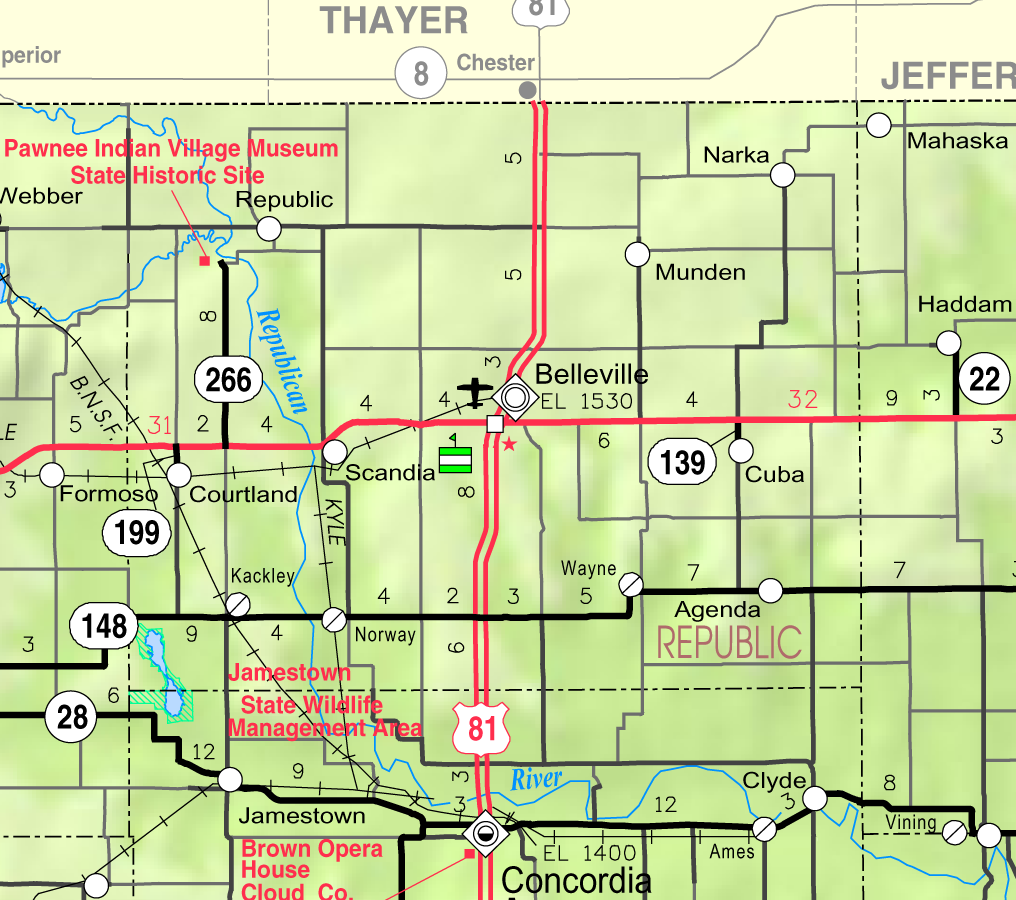
- KDOT map of Republic County (legend)
- Coordinates: 39°54′45″N 97°32′18″W
- Country: United States
- State: Kansas
- County: Republic
- Founded: 1887
- Incorporated: 1903
- Named for: John Munden

Area
  - Total: 0.19 sq mi (0.48 km^{2})
  - Land: 0.19 sq mi (0.48 km^{2})
  - Water: 0 sq mi (0.00 km^{2})
- Elevation: 1,631 ft (497 m)

Population (2020)
  - Total: 96
  - Density: 520/sq mi (200/km^{2})
- Time zone: UTC-6 (CST)
  - Summer (DST): UTC-5 (CDT)
- ZIP Code: 66959
- Area code: 785
- FIPS code: 20-49150
- GNIS ID: 2395139

Munden is a city in Republic County, Kansas, United States. As of the 2020 census, the population of the city was 96.

== History ==
Munden was founded in September 1887. It was named for John Munden, the original owner of the town site.

As of June, 2023, in Munden there is a: post office, community hall, cafe, insurance business, tool manufacturing company, and three churches.

== Geography ==
According to the United States Census Bureau, the city has a total area of 0.20 square miles (0.52 km^{2}), all land.

== Demographics ==
Historical population
Census	Pop.	Note	%±
1910	275		—
1920	339		23.3%
1930	205		−39.5%
1940	193		−5.9%
1950	169		−12.4%
1960	177		4.7%
1970	123		−30.5%
1980	152		23.6%
1990	143		−5.9%
2000	122		−14.7%
2010	100		−18.0%
2020	96		−4.0%
U.S. Decennial Census

=== 2020 census ===
The 2020 United States census counted 96 people, 54 households, and 33 families in Munden. The population density was 516.1 per square mile (199.3/km^{2}). There were 65 housing units at an average density of 349.5 per square mile (134.9/km^{2}). The racial makeup was 100.0% (96) white or European American (100.0% non-Hispanic white), 0.0% (0) black or African-American, 0.0% (0) Native American or Alaska Native, 0.0% (0) Asian, 0.0% (0) Pacific Islander or Native Hawaiian, 0.0% (0) from other races, and 0.0% (0) from two or more races. Hispanic or Latino of any race was 0.0% (0) of the population.

Of the 54 households, 29.6% had children under the age of 18; 38.9% were married couples living together; 14.8% had a female householder with no spouse or partner present. 35.2% of households consisted of individuals and 16.7% had someone living alone who was 65 years of age or older. The average household size was 2.0 and the average family size was 2.8. The percent of those with a bachelor's degree or higher was estimated to be 25.0% of the population.

25.0% of the population was under the age of 18, 6.2% from 18 to 24, 10.4% from 25 to 44, 30.2% from 45 to 64, and 28.1% who were 65 years of age or older. The median age was 53.5 years. For every 100 females, there were 71.4 males. For every 100 females ages 18 and older, there were 53.2 males.

The 2016–2020 5-year American Community Survey estimates show that the median household income was $53,750 (with a margin of error of +/- $30,920) and the median family income was $66,750 (+/- $9,682). Females had a median income of $28,333 (+/- $15,120). The median income for those above 16 years old was $23,750 (+/- $16,649). Approximately, 0.0% of families and 14.3% of the population were below the poverty line, including 0.0% of those under the age of 18 and 28.0% of those ages 65 or over.

=== 2010 census ===
At the 2010 census, there were 100 people in 49 households, including 30 families, in the city. The population density was 500.0 per square mile (193.1/km^{2}). There were 67 housing units at an average density of 335.0 per square mile (129.3/km^{2}). The racial make-up of the city was 100.0% White. Of the 49 households, 24.5% had children under the age of 18 living with them, 49.0% were married couples living together, 8.2% had a female householder with no husband present, 4.1% had a male householder with no wife present and 38.8% were non-families. 34.7% of households were one person and 6.1% were one person aged 65 or older. The average household size was 2.04 and the average family size was 2.57.

The median age was 48.9 years. 20% of residents were under the age of 18, 5% were between the ages of 18 and 24, 15% were from 25 to 44, 48% were from 45 to 64 and 12% were 65 or older. The sex make-up of the city was 50.0% male and 50.0% female.

== Education ==
The community is served by Republic County USD 109 public school district, with schools located in Belleville. It was formed in 2006 by the consolidation of Belleville USD 427 and Hillcrest USD 455. The Republic County High School team name is Republic County Buffaloes.

Munden schools were closed through school unification. The Munden High School team name was Munden Bulldogs.
