= Wayne, Kansas =

Unincorporated community in Republic County, Kansas

Coordinates: 39°42′53″N 97°32′31″W

Wayne is an unincorporated community in Republic County, Kansas, United States. It is located northeast of Concordia along K-148 highway near Co Rd 22.

== History ==
Wayne got its start in the year 1884 following construction of the railroad through that territory.

A post office was opened in Wayne in 1884, and remained in operation until it was discontinued in 1971.

== Education ==
The community is served by Republic County USD 109 public school district.
