= K-148 (Kansas highway) =

State highway in Kansas, U.S.

K-148
- K-148 highlighted in red

Route information
- Maintained by KDOT
- Length: 86.665 mi (139.474 km)
- Existed: March 27, 1956–present

Major junctions
- West end: K-28 east of Jewell
- US-81 east of Norway; US-36 south of Hanover
- East end: N-112 at the Nebraska state line near Odell, NE

Location
- Country: United States
- State: Kansas
- Counties: Jewell, Republic, Washington

Highway system
- Kansas State Highway System; Interstate; US; State; Spurs
← K-147	→ K-149

K-148 is an 86.665-mile-long (139.474 km) state highway in the U.S. state of Kansas. K-148's western terminus is at K-28 north of Randall and the northern terminus is a continuation as Nebraska Highway 112 at the Nebraska state line. K-148 is signed as east–west its entire length although the last roughly 20 miles (32 km) runs north–south. Along the way K-148 intersects several major highways including U.S. Route 81 (US-81) east of Norway and US-36 south of Hanover. The highway travels through mostly rural land and small unincorporated communities, however it does pass through the cities of Agenda and Barnes.

Before state highways were numbered in Kansas there were auto trails. The former Meridian Highway crosses K-148 slightly west of Talmo, the former Kansas White Way crosses between K-15 and Barnes, and the former Pikes Peak Ocean to Ocean Highway crosses by Hanover. On March 27, 1956, K-148 was established in Jewell, Republic, Washington counties from K-28 to K-9 and K-15. On May 2, 1988, K-148 was extended east and north over the former K-15E to the Nebraska border.

== Route description ==
The Kansas Department of Transportation (KDOT) tracks the traffic levels on its highways, and in 2018, they determined that on average the traffic varied from 115 vehicles per day at the western terminus to 1470 vehicles per day just north of the junction with US-36. K-148 is not included in the National Highway System, which is a system of highways important to the nation's defense, economy, and mobility. K-148 does connect to the National Highway System at its intersection with US-81 and its intersection with US-36.

=== Jewell and Republic counties ===
The route begins at K-28 north of Randall and east of Jewell and heads east. After about five miles (8.0 km) it curves north then back east after one mile (1.6 km). After another mile it reaches the Republic County line where it curves north and begins to follow it. It crosses Marsh Creek then curves east into the county. About 2.4 miles (3.9 km) into the county it crosses John Creek then passes to the south of the unincorporated community of Kackley and has an at-grade crossing with a BNSF Railway track 1.9 miles (3.1 km) later. The highway continues east for 3.2 miles (5.1 km) then crosses Republican River. It then passes the unincorporated community of Norway and has an at-grade crossing with a Kyle Railroad track.

K-148 then crosses Lost Creek, then intersects US-81 4.2 miles (6.8 km) later. The roadway then crosses West Creek as it continues east through rural farmlands. The highway then passes by the unincorporated community of Talmo then curves north by Union Cemetery. It continues north for one mile (1.6 km) then curves back east as it passes along the south side of the unincorporated community of Wayne. As it passes Wayne, it crosses East Creek then Turkey Creek as it continues east. The highway then crosses West Fork Elk Creek then passes along the north edge of Agenda. As it passes Agenda it crosses Elk Creek then enters into Washington County 2.9 miles (4.7 km) later.

=== Washington County ===
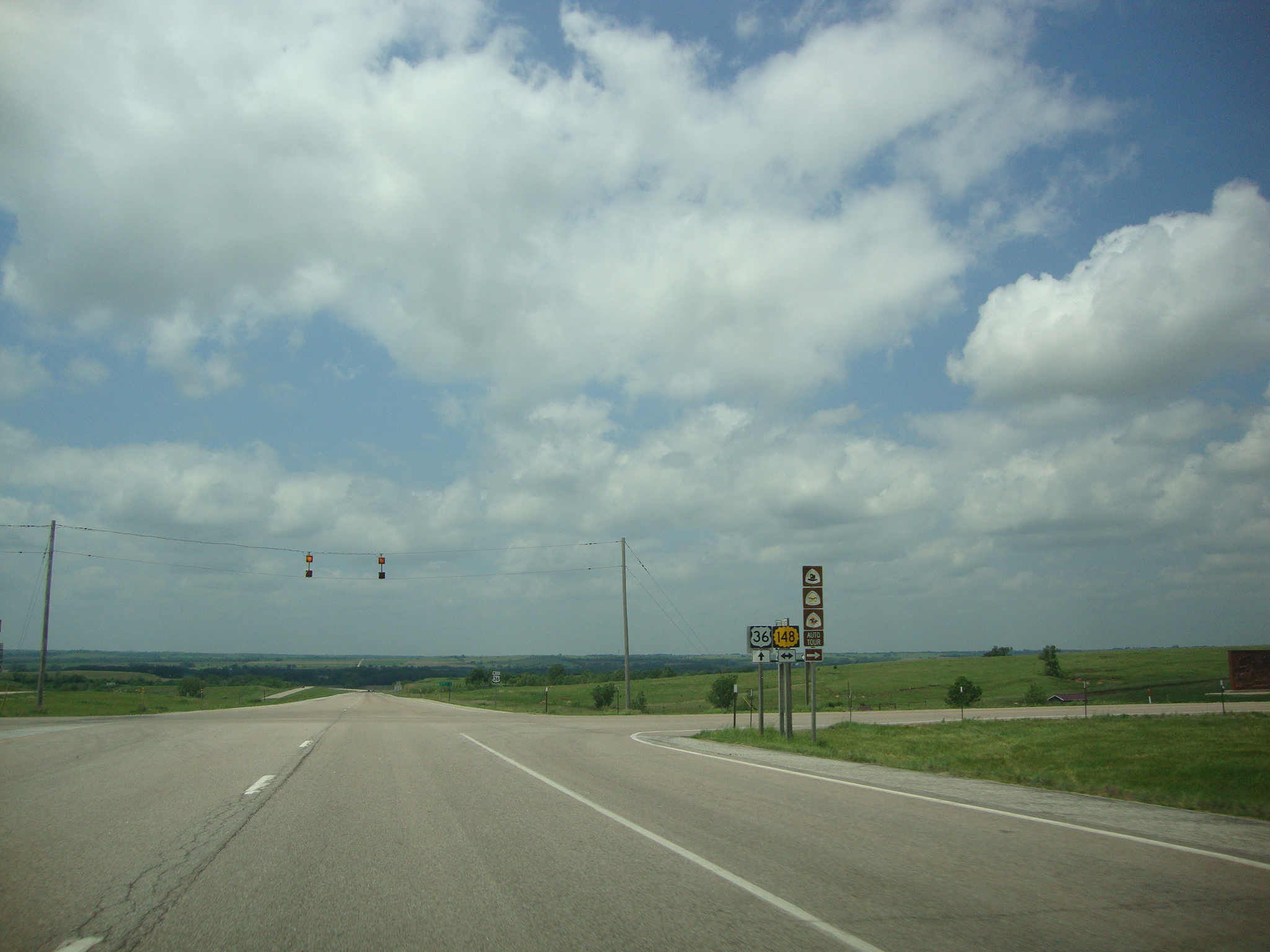
US-36 at K-148

As it enters the county it passes by Brantford. As it passes by Brantford it crosses Dry Creek then West Branch Scribner Creek one mile (1.6 km) later. The highway passes by Pleasant Hill Cemetery then intersects Eagle Road, which travels south to Clifton. K-148 continues east then soon crosses East Branch Parsons Creek then Peats Creek three miles (4.8 km) later. It then passes to the north of Reifer Cemetery then intersects K-9 and K-15 5.5 miles (8.9 km) later. Here K-148 begins to overlap K-9 as the two highways continue east. About four miles (6.4 km) farther east the highways intersect K-119, which travels north to Greenleaf. About 5.5 miles (8.9 km) later the two enter Barnes.

As the highways exit the city, K-148 turns north and K-9 continues east towards Waterville. About 4.8 miles (7.7 km) north from here, K-148 crosses Little Blue River. The highway continues roughly 4.4 miles (7.1 km) then intersects US-36, which at this point is a four-lane divided freeway. It continues north for another 3.5 miles (5.6 km) then intersects K-234 east of Hanover. The highway continues for another .5 miles (0.80 km) then intersects K-243, which heads east to the Hollenberg Pony Express Station. As it passes K-243, it has an at-grade crossing with a Union Pacific Railroad track. The road continues north for 3.5 miles (5.6 km) then crosses Horseshoe Creek. It continues north for 3.2 miles (5.1 km) then crosses into Nebraska, becoming Nebraska Highway 112.

== History ==
Prior to the formation of the Kansas state highway system, there were auto trails, which were an informal network of marked routes that existed in the United States and Canada in the early part of the 20th century. The former Meridian Highway crosses K-148 slightly west of Talmo. The highway crosses the former Kansas White Way between K-15 and Barnes. The highway crosses the former Pikes Peak Ocean to Ocean Highway by Hanover.

Before 1955, the western branch of the road was a county road. In a July 26, 1955 State Highway Commission meeting, K-148 was approved to become a state highway from K-28 to K-9 as soon as Jewell, Republic and Washington counties had brought the roadway up to state highway standards. Then by early 1956, the counties had completed necessary projects and in three separate March 27, 1956 resolutions, K-148 was established in Jewell, Republic and Washington counties. Before 1988, the section of K-148 from the K-9/K-15 intersection to the Nebraska border was designated as K-15E and the section of K-15 from the K-9/K-148 intersection northward was designated as K-15W. Then in a May 2, 1988 resolution, K-148 was extended over the former K-15E and K-15W was renumbered to K-15.

== Major intersections ==
County	Location	mi	km	Destinations	Notes
Jewell	Buffalo–Vicksburg township line	0.000	0.000	K-28 – Randall	Western terminus; highway continues as K-28 west
Republic	Lincoln Township	22.500	36.210	US-81 – Belleville, Concordia	
Washington	Linn Township	56.200	90.445	K-9 west / K-15 – Linn, Washington	Western end of K-9 overlap; former southern terminus of K-15E; K-15 north is former K-15W
Washington	Greenleaf Township	62.291	100.248	K-119 north – Greenleaf	Southern terminus of K-119
Washington	Barnes	66.252	106.622	K-9 east – Blue Rapids	Eastern end of K-9 overlap
Washington	Hanover Township	75.627	121.710	US-36 – Washington, Marysville	
Washington	Hanover	79.152	127.383	K-234 west (Hanover Avenue) – Hanover	Eastern terminus of K-234
Washington	Hanover Township	79.658	128.197	K-243 east (23 Road) – Bremen	Western terminus of K-243
40th parallel north		86.665	139.474	N-112 north / State Line Road – Beatrice	Kansas–Nebraska line; continuation into Nebraska
1.000 mi = 1.609 km; 1.000 km = 0.621 mi: Concurrency terminus
