= Center Township =

Center Township may refer to:

== Arkansas ==
- Center Township, Montgomery County, Arkansas, in Montgomery County, Arkansas
- Center Township, Polk County, Arkansas, in Polk County, Arkansas
- Center Township, Pope County, Arkansas
- Center Township, Prairie County, Arkansas, in Prairie County, Arkansas
- Center Township, Sebastian County, Arkansas, in Sebastian County, Arkansas
- Center Township, Washington County, Arkansas

== Indiana ==
- Center Township, Benton County, Indiana
- Center Township, Boone County, Indiana
- Center Township, Clinton County, Indiana
- Center Township, Dearborn County, Indiana
- Center Township, Delaware County, Indiana
- Center Township, Gibson County, Indiana
- Center Township, Grant County, Indiana
- Center Township, Greene County, Indiana
- Center Township, Hancock County, Indiana
- Center Township, Hendricks County, Indiana
- Center Township, Howard County, Indiana
- Center Township, Jennings County, Indiana
- Center Township, Lake County, Indiana
- Center Township, LaPorte County, Indiana
- Center Township, Marion County, Indiana
- Center Township, Marshall County, Indiana
- Center Township, Martin County, Indiana
- Center Township, Porter County, Indiana
- Center Township, Posey County, Indiana
- Center Township, Ripley County, Indiana
- Center Township, Rush County, Indiana
- Center Township, Starke County, Indiana
- Center Township, Union County, Indiana
- Center Township, Vanderburgh County, Indiana
- Center Township, Wayne County, Indiana

== Iowa ==
- Center Township, Allamakee County, Iowa
- Center Township, Calhoun County, Iowa
- Center Township, Cedar County, Iowa
- Center Township, Clinton County, Iowa
- Center Township, Decatur County, Iowa
- Center Township, Dubuque County, Iowa
- Center Township, Emmet County, Iowa
- Center Township, Fayette County, Iowa
- Center Township, Henry County, Iowa
- Center Township, Jefferson County, Iowa
- Center Township, Mills County, Iowa
- Center Township, Monona County, Iowa
- Center Township, O'Brien County, Iowa
- Center Township, Pocahontas County, Iowa
- Center Township, Pottawattamie County, Iowa
- Center Township, Shelby County, Iowa
- Center Township, Sioux County, Iowa
- Center Township, Wapello County, Iowa
- Center Township, Winnebago County, Iowa

== Kansas ==
- Center Township, Atchison County, Kansas
- Center Township, Chautauqua County, Kansas
- Center Township, Clark County, Kansas
- Center Township, Cloud County, Kansas
- Center Township, Decatur County, Kansas
- Center Township, Dickinson County, Kansas
- Center Township, Doniphan County, Kansas
- Center Township, Hodgeman County, Kansas
- Center Township, Jewell County, Kansas
- Center Township, Lyon County, Kansas
- Center Township, Marshall County, Kansas
- Center Township, Mitchell County, Kansas
- Center Township, Nemaha County, Kansas
- Center Township, Ness County, Kansas
- Center Township, Ottawa County, Kansas
- Center Township, Pottawatomie County, Kansas
- Center Township, Rawlins County, Kansas
- Center Township, Reno County, Kansas
- Center Township, Rice County, Kansas
- Center Township, Riley County, Kansas
- Center Township, Rush County, Kansas
- Center Township, Russell County, Kansas
- Center Township, Smith County, Kansas
- Center Township, Stevens County, Kansas, in Stevens County, Kansas
- Center Township, Wilson County, Kansas
- Center Township, Woodson County, Kansas, in Woodson County, Kansas

== Michigan ==
- Center Township, Emmet County, Michigan

== Minnesota ==
- Center Township, Minnesota

== Missouri ==
- Center Township, Buchanan County, Missouri
- Center Township, Dade County, Missouri
- Center Township, Hickory County, Missouri
- Center Township, Knox County, Missouri
- Center Township, McDonald County, Missouri
- Center Township, Ralls County, Missouri
- Center Township, St. Clair County, Missouri
- Center Township, Vernon County, Missouri

== Nebraska ==
- Center Township, Buffalo County, Nebraska
- Center Township, Butler County, Nebraska
- Center Township, Hall County, Nebraska, in Hall County
- Center Township, Phelps County, Nebraska
- Center Township, Saunders County, Nebraska

== North Carolina ==
- Center Township, Chatham County, North Carolina
- Center Township, Stanly County, North Carolina, in Stanly County, North Carolina

== North Dakota ==
- Center Township, Richland County, North Dakota, in Richland County, North Dakota

== Ohio ==
- Center Township, Carroll County, Ohio
- Center Township, Columbiana County, Ohio
- Center Township, Guernsey County, Ohio
- Center Township, Mercer County, Ohio
- Center Township, Monroe County, Ohio
- Center Township, Morgan County, Ohio
- Center Township, Noble County, Ohio
- Center Township, Williams County, Ohio
- Center Township, Wood County, Ohio

== Pennsylvania ==
- Center Township, Beaver County, Pennsylvania
- Center Township, Butler County, Pennsylvania
- Center Township, Greene County, Pennsylvania
- Center Township, Indiana County, Pennsylvania
- Center Township, Snyder County, Pennsylvania

== South Dakota ==
- Center Township, Aurora County, South Dakota, in Aurora County, South Dakota

== See also ==
- Centre Township (disambiguation)
