= Center Township, Kansas =

Center Township may refer to the following places in the U.S. state of Kansas:

- Center Township, Atchison County, Kansas
- Center Township, Chautauqua County, Kansas
- Center Township, Clark County, Kansas
- Center Township, Cloud County, Kansas
- Center Township, Decatur County, Kansas
- Center Township, Dickinson County, Kansas
- Center Township, Doniphan County, Kansas
- Center Township, Hodgeman County, Kansas
- Center Township, Jewell County, Kansas
- Center Township, Lyon County, Kansas
- Center Township, Marshall County, Kansas
- Center Township, Mitchell County, Kansas
- Center Township, Nemaha County, Kansas
- Center Township, Ness County, Kansas
- Center Township, Norton County, Kansas
- Center Township, Ottawa County, Kansas
- Center Township, Pottawatomie County, Kansas
- Center Township, Pratt County, Kansas
- Center Township, Rawlins County, Kansas
- Center Township, Reno County, Kansas
- Center Township, Rice County, Kansas
- Center Township, Riley County, Kansas
- Center Township, Rush County, Kansas
- Center Township, Russell County, Kansas
- Center Township, Smith County, Kansas
- Center Township, Stevens County, Kansas
- Center Township, Wilson County, Kansas
- Center Township, Woodson County, Kansas

== See also ==
- List of Kansas townships
- Center Township (disambiguation)
