= Center Township, Missouri =

Center Township may refer to the following places in the U.S. state of Missouri:

- Center Township, Buchanan County, Missouri
- Center Township, Dade County, Missouri
- Center Township, Hickory County, Missouri
- Center Township, Knox County, Missouri
- Center Township, McDonald County, Missouri
- Center Township, Ralls County, Missouri
- Center Township, St. Clair County, Missouri
- Center Township, Vernon County, Missouri

== See also ==
- Center Township (disambiguation)
