= Sheridan Township, Ottawa County, Kansas =

Township in Ottawa County, Kansas, U.S.

Sheridan Township
- Township
- Location within Ottawa County
- Coordinates: 39.265683°N 97.763209°W
- Country: United States
- State: Kansas
- County: Ottawa

Area
  - Total: 36.288 sq mi (93.99 km^{2})
  - Land: 36.262 sq mi (93.92 km^{2})
  - Water: 0.026 sq mi (0.067 km^{2}) 0.07%
- Elevation: 1,312 ft (400 m)

Population (2020)
  - Total: 402
  - Density: 11.1/sq mi (4.28/km^{2})
- Time zone: UTC-6 (CST)
  - Summer (DST): UTC-5 (CDT)
- Area code: 785
- GNIS feature ID: 476140

Sheridan Township is a township in Ottawa County, Kansas, United States. As of the 2020 census, its population was 402.

== Geography ==
Sheridan Township covers an area of 36.288 square miles (93.99 square kilometers). The Solomon River flows through it.

=== Communities ===
- Delphos

=== Adjacent townships ===
- Lyon Township, Cloud County (north)
- Meredith Township, Cloud County (northeast)
- Logan Township, Ottawa County (east)
- Blaine Township, Ottawa County (southeast)
- Garfield Township, Ottawa County (south)
- Fountain Township, Ottawa County (southwest)
- Stanton Township, Ottawa County (west)
- Solomon Township, Cloud County (northwest)

== Transportation ==
=== Major highways ===
- K-41
