= Center Township, Arkansas =

Center Township, Arkansas may refer to:

- Center Township, Montgomery County, Arkansas
- Center Township, Polk County, Arkansas
- Center Township, Pope County, Arkansas
- Center Township, Prairie County, Arkansas
- Center Township, Sebastian County, Arkansas
- Center Township, Washington County, Arkansas

== See also ==
- List of townships in Arkansas
- Center Township (disambiguation)
