= Asherville Township, Kansas =

Township in Mitchell County, Kansas, U.S.

Asherville Township
- Township
- Location within Mitchell County
- Coordinates: 39.430404°N 97.981685°W
- Country: United States
- State: Kansas
- County: Mitchell

Area
  - Total: 36.301 sq mi (94.02 km^{2})
  - Land: 36.288 sq mi (93.99 km^{2})
  - Water: 0.013 sq mi (0.034 km^{2}) 0.04%

Population (2020)
  - Total: 119
  - Density: 3.28/sq mi (1.27/km^{2})
- Time zone: UTC-6 (CST)
  - Summer (DST): UTC-5 (CDT)
- Area code: 785

Asherville Township is a township in Mitchell County, Kansas, United States. As of the 2020 census, its population was 119.

== Geography ==
Asherville Township covers an area of 36.301 square miles (94.02 square kilometers). The Solomon River flows through it.

=== Communities ===
- Asherville

=== Adjacent townships ===
- Lulu Township, Mitchell County (north)
- Summit Township, Cloud County (northeast)
- Solomon Township, Cloud County (southeast)
- Logan Township, Mitchell County (south)
- Bloomfield Township, Mitchell County (southwest)
- Beloit Township, Mitchell County (west)
- Plum Creek Township, Mitchell County (northwest)

=== Major highways ===
- US-24
- K-9
