= Stanton Township, Ottawa County, Kansas =

Township in Ottawa County, Kansas, U.S.

Stanton Township
- Township
- Location within Ottawa County
- Coordinates: 39.261338°N 97.873919°W
- Country: United States
- State: Kansas
- County: Ottawa

Area
  - Total: 36.654 sq mi (94.93 km^{2})
  - Land: 36.609 sq mi (94.82 km^{2})
  - Water: 0.045 sq mi (0.12 km^{2}) 0.12%
- Elevation: 1,608 ft (490 m)

Population (2020)
  - Total: 50
  - Density: 1.4/sq mi (0.53/km^{2})
- Time zone: UTC-6 (CST)
  - Summer (DST): UTC-5 (CDT)
- Area code: 785
- GNIS feature ID: 476139

Stanton Township is a township in Ottawa County, Kansas, United States. As of the 2020 census, its population was 50.

== Geography ==
Stanton Township covers an area of 36.654 square miles (94.93 square kilometers).

=== Adjacent townships ===
- Solomon Township, Cloud County (north)
- Lyon Township, Cloud County (northeast)
- Sheridan Township, Ottawa County (east)
- Garfield Township, Ottawa County (southeast)
- Fountain Township, Ottawa County (south)
- Salt Creek Township, Lincoln County (southwest)
- Eureka Township, Mitchell County (west)
- Logan Township, Mitchell County (northwest)
