= Logan Township, Ottawa County, Kansas =

Township in Ottawa County, Kansas, U.S.

Logan Township
- Township
- Location within Ottawa County
- Coordinates: 39.269075°N 97.64307°W
- Country: United States
- State: Kansas
- County: Ottawa

Area
  - Total: 36.049 sq mi (93.37 km^{2})
  - Land: 36.021 sq mi (93.29 km^{2})
  - Water: 0.028 sq mi (0.073 km^{2}) 0.08%
- Elevation: 1,348 ft (411 m)

Population (2020)
  - Total: 74
  - Density: 2.1/sq mi (0.79/km^{2})
- Time zone: UTC-6 (CST)
  - Summer (DST): UTC-5 (CDT)
- Area code: 785
- GNIS feature ID: 476145

Logan Township is a township in Ottawa County, Kansas, United States. As of the 2020 census, its population was 74.

== Geography ==
Logan Township covers an area of 36.049 square miles (93.37 square kilometers).

=== Adjacent townships ===
- Meredith Township, Cloud County (north)
- Oakland Township, Cloud County (northeast)
- Sherman Township, Ottawa County (east)
- Grant Township, Ottawa County (southeast)
- Blaine Township, Ottawa County (south)
- Garfield Township, Ottawa County (southwest)
- Sheridan Township, Ottawa County (west)
- Lyon Township, Cloud County (northwest)

== Transportation ==
=== Major highways ===
- US-81
- K-41
