= Shirley Township =

Shirley Township may refer to the following townships in the United States:

- Shirley Township, Cloud County, Kansas
- Shirley Township, Ripley County, Missouri
- Shirley Township, Pennsylvania
