= Allen Township, Jewell County, Kansas =

Allen Township
- Township
- Location in Jewell County
- Coordinates: 39°36′05″N 98°58′16″W
- Country: United States
- State: Kansas
- County: Jewell

Area
  - Total: 34.85 sq mi (90.27 km^{2})
  - Land: 34.85 sq mi (90.25 km^{2})
  - Water: 0.0077 sq mi (0.02 km^{2}) 0.02%
- Elevation: 1,722 ft (525 m)

Population (2020)
  - Total: 13
  - Density: 0.37/sq mi (0.14/km^{2})
- GNIS feature ID: 0472110

Allen Township is a township in Jewell County, Kansas, United States. As of the 2020 census, its population was 13.

== Geography ==
Allen Township covers an area of 34.85 square miles (90.27 square kilometers); of this, 0.01 square miles (0.02 square kilometers) or 0.02 percent is water. The streams of Dry Creek and Little Cheyenne Creek run through the township.

=== Adjacent townships ===
- Vicksburg Township (north)
- Beaver Township, Republic County (northeast)
- Grant Township, Cloud County (east)
- Lulu Township, Mitchell County (south)
- Plum Creek Township, Mitchell County (southwest)
- Prairie Township (west)

=== Cemeteries ===
The township contains two cemeteries: Lutheran and West Hope.

=== Major highways ===
- K-28
