= Lulu Township, Kansas =

Township in Mitchell County, Kansas, U.S.

Lulu Township
- Township
- Location within Mitchell County
- Coordinates: 39.52399°N 97.984829°W
- Country: United States
- State: Kansas
- County: Mitchell

Area
  - Total: 35.519 sq mi (91.99 km^{2})
  - Land: 35.519 sq mi (91.99 km^{2})
  - Water: 0 sq mi (0 km^{2}) 0%

Population (2020)
  - Total: 80
  - Density: 2.3/sq mi (0.87/km^{2})
- Time zone: UTC-6 (CST)
  - Summer (DST): UTC-5 (CDT)
- Area code: 785

Lulu Township is a township in Mitchell County, Kansas, United States. As of the 2020 census, its population was 80.

== Geography ==
Lulu Township covers an area of 35.519 square miles (91.99 square kilometers).

=== Communities ===
- Scottsville

=== Adjacent townships ===
- Allen Township, Jewell County (north)
- Grant Township, Cloud County (northeast)
- Summit Township, Cloud County (east)
- Asherville Township, Mitchell County (south)
- Beloit Township, Mitchell County (southwest)
- Plum Creek Township, Mitchell County (west)

=== Major highways ===
- K-9
