= Pittsburg Township =

Pittsburg Township may refer to:

- Pittsburg Township, Johnson County, Arkansas, in Johnson County, Arkansas
- Pittsburg Township, Mitchell County, Kansas
