= Vicksburg Township, Kansas =

Vicksburg Township Jewell County, Kansas
- Township
- Location in Jewell County
- Coordinates: 39°41′55″N 97°58′16″W
- Country: United States
- State: Kansas
- County: Jewell

Area
  - Total: 35.77 sq mi (92.64 km^{2})
  - Land: 35.77 sq mi (92.64 km^{2})
  - Water: 0 sq mi (0 km^{2}) 0%
- Elevation: 1,407 ft (429 m)

Population (2020)
  - Total: 21
  - Density: 0.59/sq mi (0.23/km^{2})
- GNIS feature ID: 0472115

Vicksburg Township is a township in Jewell County, Kansas, United States. As of the 2020 census, its population was 21.

== Geography ==
Vicksburg Township covers an area of 35.77 square miles (92.64 square kilometers). The streams of East Marsh Creek, Prairie Creek, Rankin Creek and West Marsh Creek run through this township.

=== Adjacent townships ===
- Grant Township (north)
- Courtland Township, Republic County (northeast)
- Beaver Township, Republic County (east)
- Grant Township, Cloud County (southeast)
- Allen Township (south)
- Prairie Township (southwest)
- Buffalo Township (west)
- Washington Township (northwest)

=== Cemeteries ===
The township contains one cemetery, Caldwell.

=== Major highways ===
- K-148
