= Logan Township, Mitchell County, Kansas =

Township in Mitchell County, Kansas, U.S.

Logan Township
- Township
- Location within Mitchell County
- Coordinates: 39.347916°N 97.98193°W
- Country: United States
- State: Kansas
- County: Mitchell

Area
  - Total: 36.198 sq mi (93.75 km^{2})
  - Land: 36.16 sq mi (93.7 km^{2})
  - Water: 0.038 sq mi (0.098 km^{2}) 0.10%

Population (2020)
  - Total: 121
  - Density: 3.35/sq mi (1.29/km^{2})
- Time zone: UTC-6 (CST)
  - Summer (DST): UTC-5 (CDT)
- Area code: 785

Logan Township is a township in Mitchell County, Kansas, United States. As of the 2020 census, its population was 121.

== Geography ==
Logan Township covers an area of 36.017 square miles (93.75 square kilometers). The Solomon River flows through it.

=== Communities ===
- part of Simpson

=== Adjacent townships ===
- Asherville Township, Mitchell County (north)
- Solomon Township, Cloud County (east)
- Stanton Township, Ottawa County (southeast)
- Eureka Township, Mitchell County (south)
- Salt Creek Township, Mitchell County (southwest)
- Bloomfield Township, Mitchell County (west)
- Beloit Township, Mitchell County (northwest)
