= U.S. Route 81 in Kansas =

Segment of American highway

U.S. Highway 81
- US-81 highlighted in red

Route information
- Maintained by KDOT and the cities of Wellington, Wichita, and Concordia

Major junctions
- South end: US 81 at the Oklahoma state line in Caldwell
- US-177 in South Haven; US-160 in Wellington; I-135 in Wichita; I-235 in Wichita; US-54 / US-400 in Wichita; US-50 in Newton; US-56 in McPherson; I-70 / I-135 / US-40 west of Salina; US-24 south of Concordia; US-36 in Belleville
- North end: US 81 at the Nebraska state line in Chester, NE

Location
- Country: United States
- State: Kansas
- Counties: Sumner, Sedgwick, Harvey, McPherson, Saline, Ottawa, Cloud, Republic

Highway system
- United States Numbered Highway System; List; Special; Divided; Kansas State Highway System; Interstate; US; State; Spurs
← K-80	→ K-82
← K-154	155	→ K-156
← K-224	K-225, K-226	→ K-227

U.S. Route 81 (US-81) is a part of the U.S. Highway System that travels from Fort Worth, Texas, to the Pembina–Emerson Border Crossing near Pembina, North Dakota. In the state of Kansas, US-81 is a main north–south highway central part of the state. Wichita is the only metropolitan area US-81 serves in the state, but the highway does serve several other larger towns in Kansas such as (from south to north) Wellington and Concordia.

== Route description ==
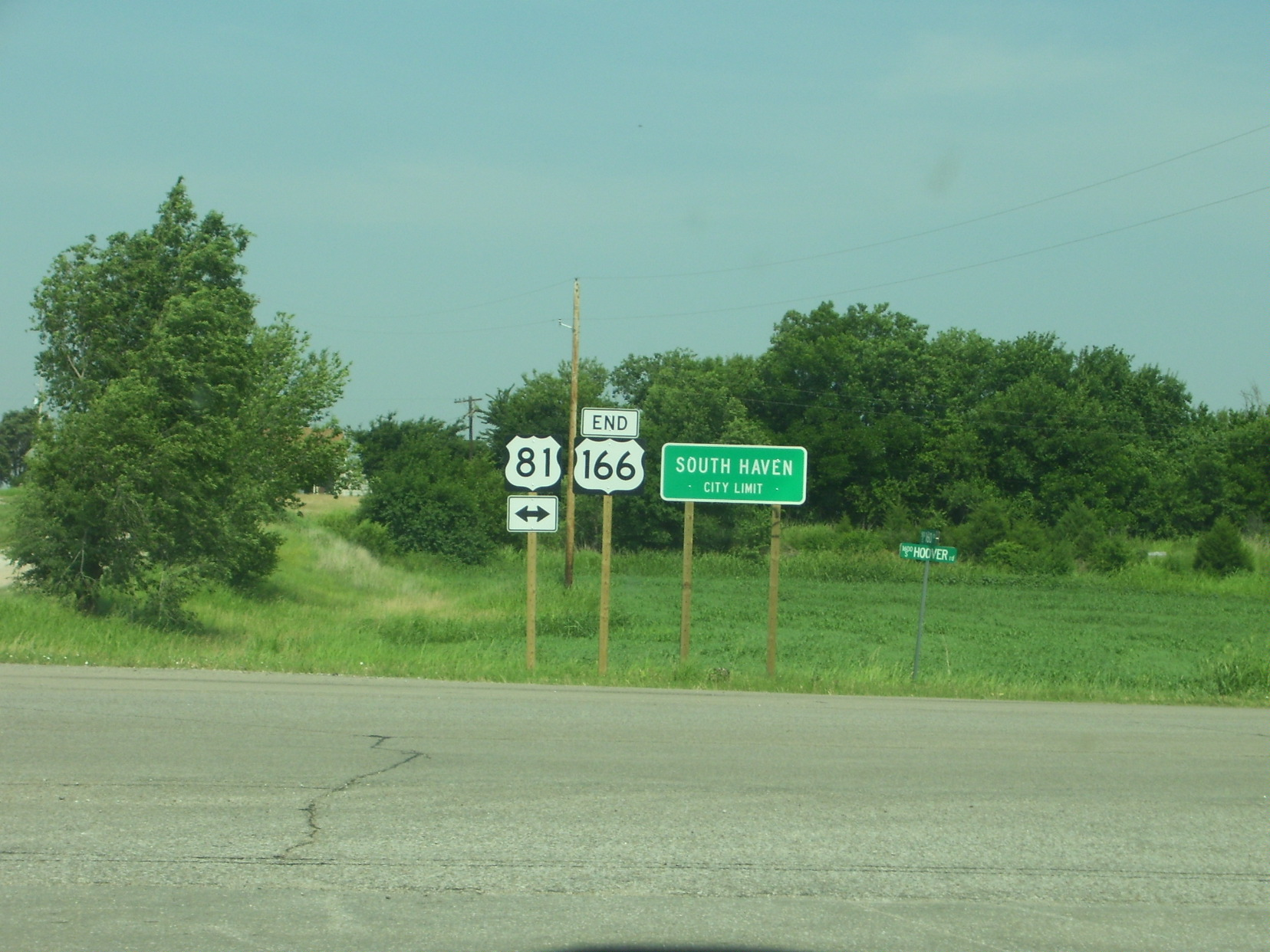
US-81 at US-166's western terminus

Nearly all of US-81 in Kansas is either freeway or expressway. The route enters Kansas as a two-lane highway near Caldwell. From South Haven to Wichita, it closely parallels Interstate 35 (I-35), which is also known as the Kansas Turnpike in that area. After South Haven, the only town of any significance along US-81 until Wichita is Wellington, which is just west of the turnpike along US-160.

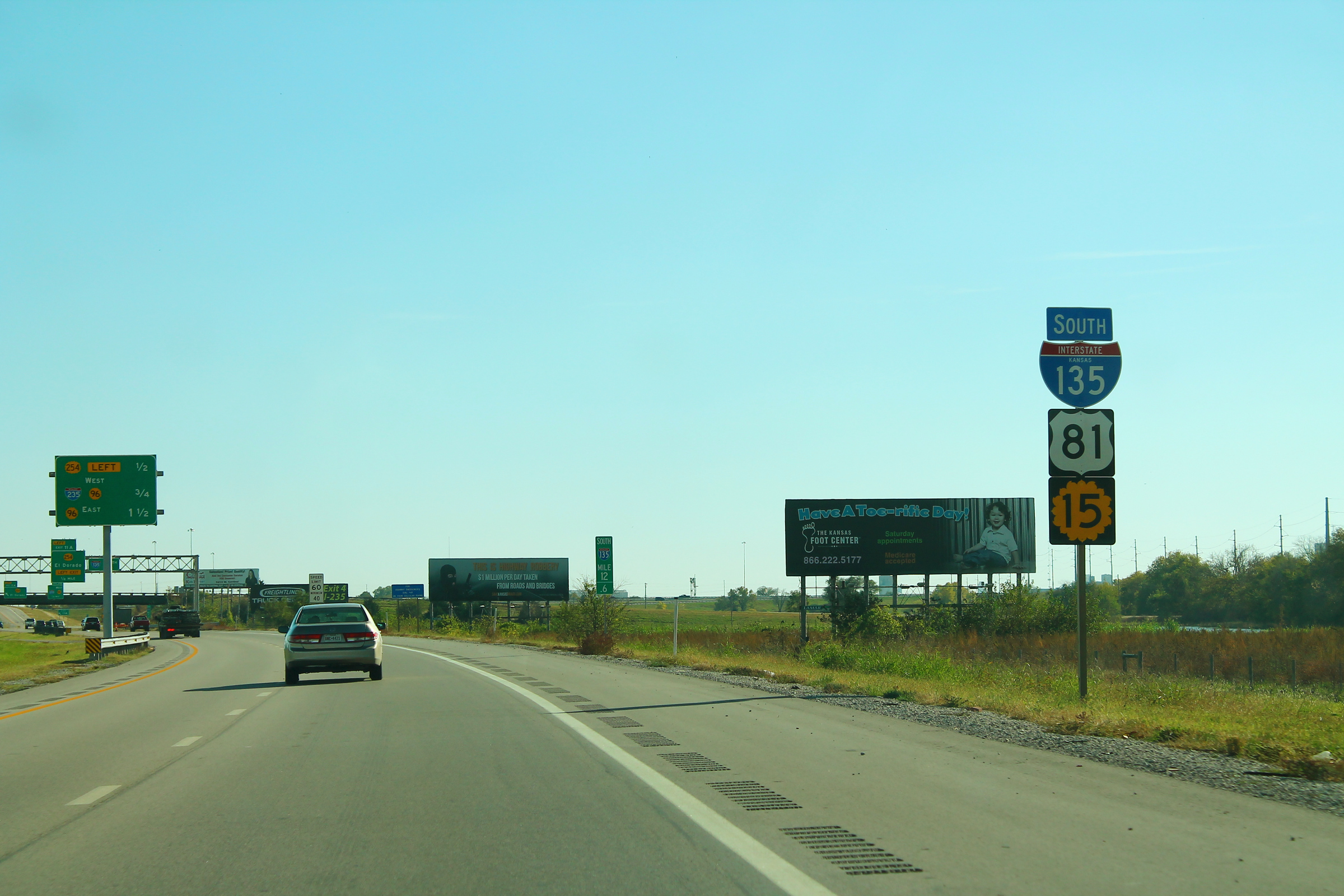
US-81 concurrent with I-135 and K-15

At Wichita, US-81 joins I-135. The two highways remain joined until Salina, with I-135's mile markers taking precedence. I-135 ends at I-70, but US-81 continues as a freeway to Minneapolis, then as an expressway passing through Concordia before exiting the state north of Belleville.

All but 5.3 miles (9 km) of US-81's alignment is maintained by KDOT. The entire 3.128-mile (5.034 km) section within Wellington is maintained by the city. The section within Wichita from the south city limit to I-135 is maintained by the city. The entire 2.123-mile (3.417 km) section within Concordia is maintained by the city.

== History ==
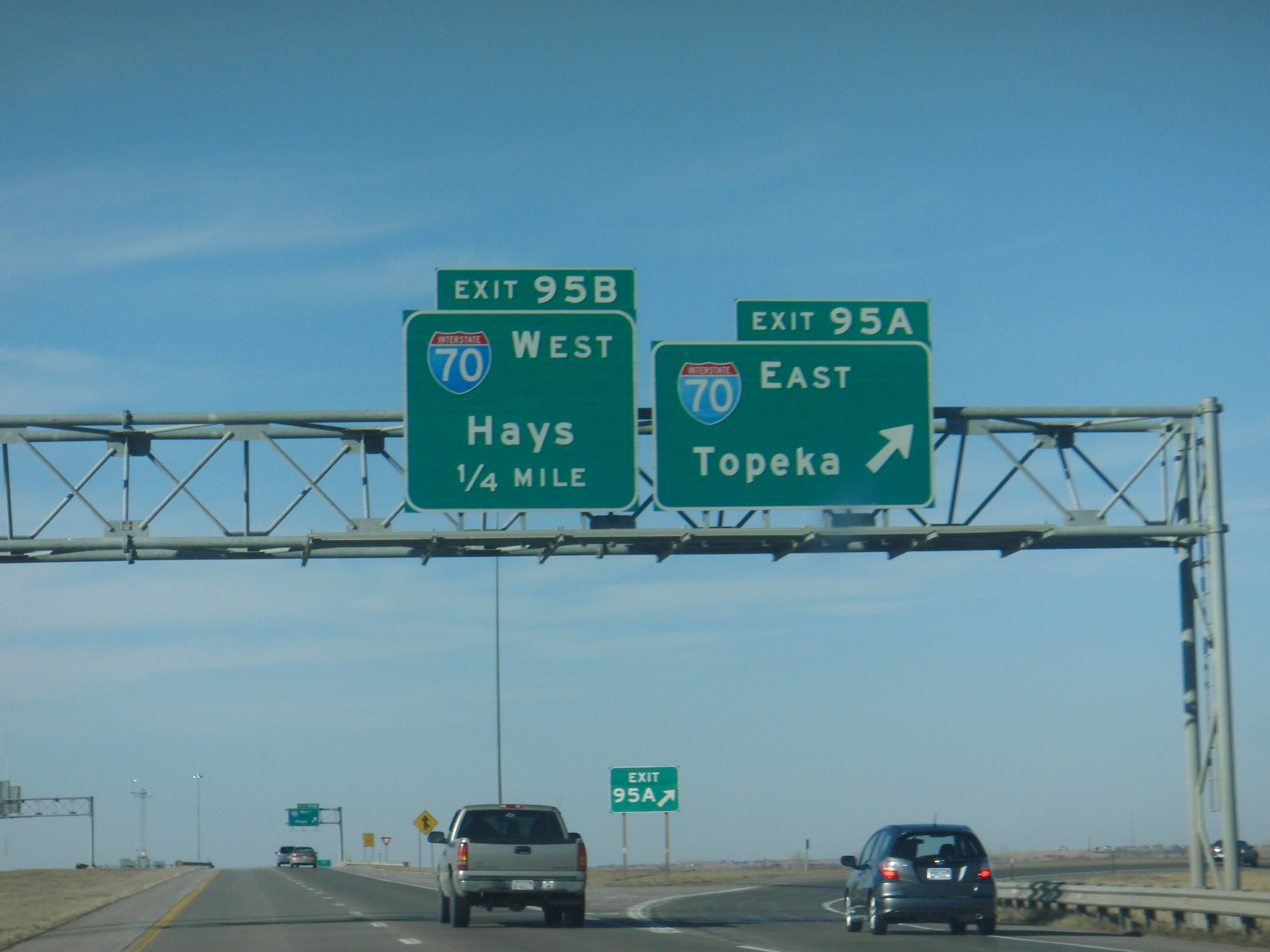
US-81 at the north end of I-135 at I-70

The alignment of US-81 from Wichita to Salina prior to the completion I-135 is fully intact. The prior alignment ran from where current US-81 breaks off for I-135 at 47th street, north through Wichita along Broadway street. Old US-81 is roughly paralleled by I-135 to Newton. Old US-81 follows current K-15 through Newton between an interchange with US-50 and Hesston Road, where old US-81 breaks northwest onto Hesston road. Old US-81 then travels through the small Kansas towns of Hesston, Moundridge, and Elyria, before turning to the north, and going through the town of McPherson as Main street. North of McPherson, old US-81 continues to Lindsborg, where it follows current K-4 until an interchange with I-135. Old US-81 passes under Interstate 135 and continues to be paralleled by it about 1/2 mile to the east. Old US-81 then travels through Assaria, where it encounters another brief overlap with K-4 and K-104. Old US-81 continues through the city of Salina as Ninth street. North of Salina, Old US-81 encounters brief overlaps with K-143 and K-18. Old US-81 follows K-106 to an interchange with current US-81, where the two alignments are joined back together.

In the 2020s, the US 81 corridor north of Wichita was designated as an Alternative Fuel Corridor for electric vehicles.

K-225
- Location: Wichita
- Length: .466 mi (750 m)
- Existed: June 8, 1960–c. 1979

In a June 8, 1960, resolution, K-225 was assigned from US-81 east to I-35W (modern I-135). K-225 became a section of US-81 by 1979, when US-81 was moved from its former alignment in Wichita to run along I-135.

K-226 was first designated as a state highway in a March 8, 1961, resolution. The highway remained the same, then between 1979 and 1981, US-81 had been realigned onto I-35W and at this time K-226 was decommissioned.

K-155
- Location: Near Lindsborg
- Existed: August 24, 1966–March 29, 1961

In an August 24, 1966, resolution, a section of the new I-35W was to be built south of Lindsborg. At this time, K-155 was proposed to connect US-81 to the new I-35W. This plan was later cancelled in a March 29, 1961, meeting, when US-81 was realigned onto I-35W to current exit 72, then west along the proposed K-155 (modern Smoky Valley Road) to the old US-81 alignment.

From Salina to the Nebraska state line, the highway is named the Frank Carlson Memorial Highway, in honor of the late Senator Frank Carlson. Senator Carlson was a native of Concordia who represented Kansas in the U.S. Senate from 1951 to 1969. Before serving in the Senate, he was Governor of Kansas from 1947 to 1950.

== Major intersections ==
County	Location	mi	km	Exit	Destinations	Notes
Sumner	Caldwell Township	0.000	0.000		US 81 south – Enid	Continuation into Oklahoma
Sumner	Caldwell				K-49 north (Main Street north) – Conway Springs	Southern terminus of K-49
Sumner	South Haven				US-177 south (Main Street south) – Blackwell OK	Northern terminus of US-177
Sumner	South Haven				US-166 east – Arkansas City	Western terminus of US-166
Sumner	Wellington				US-160 west (8th Street) – Harper	Southern terminus of US-160 concurrency
Sumner	Wellington				North Washington Avenue – Business District	Former routing of US-81
Sumner	Wellington				US-160 east / 16th Street / A Street south – Winfield	Northern terminus of US-160 concurrency; roundabout
Sumner	Belle Plaine Township				K-55 east – Belle Plaine	Western terminus of K-55
Sumner–Sedgwick county line	Belle Plaine–Salem township line				K-53 east to I-35 / Kansas Turnpike – Mulvane	Western terminus of K-53
Sedgwick	Wichita				To I-35 / Kansas Turnpike via Grand Avenue	
Sedgwick	Wichita				I-135 south to I-35 / Kansas Turnpike	Tolled; south end of freeway section; southern terminus of I-135 concurrency; I-135 exit 1A
Overlap with I-135
Saline	Salina			95A-B	I-135 ends / I-70 / US-40 – Topeka, Hays	Northern terminus of I-135 concurrency; northern terminus of I-135; I-70 exit 250A-B; I-135 exit 95A-B; cloverleaf interchange
Saline	Elm Creek Township			—	K-143 south	Northern terminus of K-143
Ottawa	Bennington Township			—	K-18 – Lincoln, Junction City	
Ottawa	Concord Township			—	K-106 – Minneapolis	Northern end of freeway section
Ottawa	Logan Township				K-41 west – Delphos	Eastern terminus of K-41
Cloud	Meredith Township				US-24 – Clay Center, Beloit	Interchange
Cloud	Concordia				K-9 (Sixth Street) – Beloit, Clyde	
Republic	Lincoln Township				K-148 – Norway, Agenda	
Republic	Belleville				US-36 – Washington, Mankato	Interchange
Republic	Liberty Township				US 81 north – Hebron	Continuation into Nebraska
1.000 mi = 1.609 km; 1.000 km = 0.621 mi: Concurrency terminus; Tolled

== Business routes ==
=== McPherson ===
U.S. Highway 81 Business
- Location: McPherson
- Existed: 1970–present

Business US-81 in Kansas is in McPherson. This route is six miles (9.7 km) long. It begins at the intersection of I-135, US-81, and US-56 east of McPherson. It goes west on Kansas Avenue for about two miles (3.2 km) in a concurrency with US-56 and turns south on Main Street for two miles (3.2 km), passing Central Christian College and National Cooperative Refinery Association. At K-61, it exits east in a two-mile (3.2 km) wrong-way concurrency with K-61 before ending at I-135 and US-81 southeast of McPherson.

Bus. US-81 in McPherson first appeared on the Kansas Department of Transportation Map in 1970 when I-35W (now I-135) was completed between McPherson and Salina.

=== Lindsborg ===
U.S. Highway 81 Business
- Location: Lindsborg
- Existed: 1970–2012

Former Business US-81 in Lindsborg began at the intersection of I-135, US-81, and K-4 north of Lindsborg on an older routing of US-81. It shared a four-mile (6.4 km) concurrency with K-4, which turns to the west in south Lindsborg. At this junction, it went for another mile south before turning east on Smoky Valley Road, ending three miles (4.8 km) later at I-135 and US-81. This Bus. US-81 had a total length of eight miles (13 km).

The Lindsborg business loop first appeared in 1970, at the same time as the McPherson loop.

U.S. Route 81
Previous state: Oklahoma	Kansas	Next state: Nebraska
