= Aurora Township, Kansas =

Aurora Township
- Township
- Location in Cloud County
- Coordinates: 39°26′30″N 097°32′01″W
- Country: United States
- State: Kansas
- County: Cloud

Area
  - Total: 36.19 sq mi (93.72 km^{2})
  - Land: 36.17 sq mi (93.69 km^{2})
  - Water: 0.012 sq mi (0.03 km^{2}) 0.03%
- Elevation: 1,499 ft (457 m)

Population (2020)
  - Total: 133
  - Density: 3.68/sq mi (1.42/km^{2})
- GNIS feature ID: 0475998

Aurora Township is a township in Cloud County, Kansas, United States. As of the 2020 census, its population was 133.

== History ==
Aurora Township was organized in 1872.

== Geography ==
Aurora Township covers an area of 36.19 square miles (93.7 km^{2}) and contains one incorporated settlement, Aurora. According to the USGS, it contains two cemeteries: Princeville and Saint Peters.
