= Eureka Township, Mitchell County, Kansas =

Township in Mitchell County, Kansas, U.S.

Eureka Township
- Township
- Location within Mitchell County
- Coordinates: 39.254933°N 97.97958°W
- Country: United States
- State: Kansas
- County: Mitchell

Area
  - Total: 36.014 sq mi (93.28 km^{2})
  - Land: 35.929 sq mi (93.06 km^{2})
  - Water: 0.085 sq mi (0.22 km^{2}) 0.24%

Population (2020)
  - Total: 26
  - Density: 0.72/sq mi (0.28/km^{2})
- Time zone: UTC-6 (CST)
  - Summer (DST): UTC-5 (CDT)
- Area code: 785

Eureka Township is a township in Mitchell County, Kansas, United States. As of the 2020 census, its population was 26.

== Geography ==
Eureka Township covers an area of 36.014 square miles (92.28 square kilometers).

=== Adjacent townships ===
- Logan Township, Mitchell County (north)
- Solomon Township, Cloud County (northeast)
- Stanton Township, Ottawa County (east)
- Fountain Township, Ottawa County (southeast)
- Salt Creek Township, Lincoln County (south)
- Scott Township, Lincoln County (southwest)
- Salt Creek Township, Mitchell County (west)
- Bloomfield Township, Mitchell County (northwest)
