= Starr Township =

Starr Township may refer to the following townships in the United States:

- Starr Township, Cloud County, Kansas
- Starr Township, Hocking County, Ohio
