= Battle Creek Township, Kansas =

Township in Lincoln County, Kansas, U.S.

Battle Creek Township
- Township
- Location in Lincoln County
- Coordinates: 39.168751°N 98.219133°W
- Country: United States
- State: Kansas
- County: Lincoln

Area
  - Total: 36.015 sq mi (93.28 km^{2})
  - Land: 35.882 sq mi (92.93 km^{2})
  - Water: 0.133 sq mi (0.34 km^{2}) 0.37%

Population (2020)
  - Total: 34
  - Density: 0.95/sq mi (0.37/km^{2})
- Time zone: UTC-6 (CST)
  - Summer (DST): UTC-5 (CDT)
- Area code: 785

Battle Creek Township is a township in Lincoln County, Kansas, United States. As of the 2020 census, its population was 34.

== Geography ==
Battle Creek Township covers an area of 36.015 square miles (93.28 square kilometers).

=== Adjacent townships ===
- Round Springs Township, Mitchell County (north)
- Salt Creek Township, Mitchell County (northeast)
- Scott Township, Lincoln County (east)
- Marion Township, Lincoln County (south)
- Grant Township, Lincoln County (southwest)
- Orange Township, Lincoln County (west)
- Blue Hill Township, Mitchell County (northwest)

=== Major highways ===
- K-14
