= Cawker Township, Kansas =

Township in Mitchell County, Kansas, U.S.

Cawker Township
- Township
- Location within Mitchell County
- Coordinates: 39.521191°N 98.428216°W
- Country: United States
- State: Kansas
- County: Mitchell

Area
  - Total: 35.667 sq mi (92.38 km^{2})
  - Land: 29.22 sq mi (75.7 km^{2})
  - Water: 6.447 sq mi (16.70 km^{2}) 18.07%

Population (2020)
  - Total: 516
  - Density: 17.7/sq mi (6.82/km^{2})
- Time zone: UTC-6 (CST)
  - Summer (DST): UTC-5 (CDT)
- Area code: 785

Cawker Township is a township in Mitchell County, Kansas, United States. As of the 2020 census, its population was 516.

== Geography ==
Cawker Township covers an area of 35.667 square miles (92.38 square kilometers). Most of Waconda Lake is within the township.

=== Communities ===
- Cawker City

=== Adjacent townships ===
- Erving Township, Jewell County (north)
- Athens Township, Jewell County (northeast)
- Glen Elder Township, Mitchell County (east)
- Walnut Creek Township, Mitchell County (southeast)
- Carr Creek Township, Mitchell County (south)
- Corinth Township, Osborne County (southwest)
- Ross Township, Osborne County (west)

=== Major highways ===
- US-24
- K-9
