= Browns Creek Township, Kansas =

Browns Creek Township
- Township
- Location in Jewell County
- Coordinates: 39°36′05″N 98°12′31″W
- Country: United States
- State: Kansas
- County: Jewell

Area
  - Total: 36.0 sq mi (93.3 km^{2})
  - Land: 36.01 sq mi (93.27 km^{2})
  - Water: 0.0077 sq mi (0.02 km^{2}) 0.02%
- Elevation: 1,552 ft (473 m)

Population (2020)
  - Total: 57
  - Density: 1.6/sq mi (0.61/km^{2})
- GNIS feature ID: 0472099

Browns Creek Township is a township in Jewell County, Kansas, United States. As of the 2020 census, its population was 57.

== Geography ==
Browns Creek Township covers an area of 36.02 square miles (93.3 square kilometers); of this, 0.01 square miles (0.02 square kilometers) or 0.02 percent is water.

=== Adjacent townships ===
- Calvin Township (north)
- Buffalo Township (northeast)
- Prairie Township (east)
- Solomon Rapids Township, Mitchell County (south)
- Glen Elder Township, Mitchell County (southwest)
- Athens Township (west)
- Ionia Township (northwest)

=== Cemeteries ===
The township contains two cemeteries: Fairview and Union.

=== Major highways ===
- K-14
