= Bloomfield Township, Mitchell County, Kansas =

Township in Mitchell County, Kansas, U.S.

Bloomfield Township
- Township
- Location within Mitchell County
- Coordinates: 39.342653°N 98.097508°W
- Country: United States
- State: Kansas
- County: Mitchell

Area
  - Total: 36.201 sq mi (93.76 km^{2})
  - Land: 36.142 sq mi (93.61 km^{2})
  - Water: 0.059 sq mi (0.15 km^{2}) 0.16%

Population (2020)
  - Total: 81
  - Density: 2.2/sq mi (0.87/km^{2})
- Time zone: UTC-6 (CST)
  - Summer (DST): UTC-5 (CDT)
- Area code: 785

Bloomfield Township is a township in Mitchell County, Kansas, United States. As of the 2020 census, its population was 81.

== Geography ==
Bloomfield Township covers an area of 36.201 square miles (93.76 square kilometers).

=== Adjacent townships ===
- Beloit Township, Mitchell County (north)
- Asherville Township, Mitchell County (northeast)
- Logan Township, Mitchell County (east)
- Eureka Township, Mitchell County (southeast)
- Salt Creek Township, Mitchell County (south)
- Round Springs Township, Mitchell County (southwest)
- Center Township, Mitchell County (west)
- Turkey Creek Township, Mitchell County (northwest)

=== Major highways ===
- K-14
