= Carr Creek Township, Kansas =

Township in Mitchell County, Kansas, U.S.

Carr Creek Township
- Township
- Location within Mitchell County
- Coordinates: 39.430649°N 98.430029°W
- Country: United States
- State: Kansas
- County: Mitchell

Area
  - Total: 35.947 sq mi (93.10 km^{2})
  - Land: 33.16 sq mi (85.9 km^{2})
  - Water: 2.787 sq mi (7.22 km^{2}) 7.75%

Population (2020)
  - Total: 23
  - Density: 0.69/sq mi (0.27/km^{2})
- Time zone: UTC-6 (CST)
  - Summer (DST): UTC-5 (CDT)
- Area code: 785

Carr Creek Township is a township in Mitchell County, Kansas, United States. As of the 2020 census, its population was 23.

== Geography ==
Carr Creek Township covers an area of 35.947 square miles (93.10 square kilometers). Part of Waconda Lake is within the township, and the South Fork Solomon River flows through the township.

=== Adjacent townships ===
- Cawker Township, Mitchell County (north)
- Glen Elder Township, Mitchell County (northeast)
- Walnut Creek Township, Mitchell County (east)
- Hayes Township, Mitchell County (southeast)
- Pittsburg Township, Mitchell County (south)
- Bloom Township, Osborne County (southwest)
- Corinth Township, Osborne County (west)
- Ross Township, Osborne County (northwest)
