= Odessa Township, Kansas =

Odessa Township
- Township
- Location in Jewell County
- Coordinates: 39°42′02″N 98°27′21″W
- Country: United States
- State: Kansas
- County: Jewell

Area
  - Total: 35.88 sq mi (92.94 km^{2})
  - Land: 35.87 sq mi (92.91 km^{2})
  - Water: 0.0077 sq mi (0.02 km^{2}) 0.02%
- Elevation: 1,821 ft (555 m)

Population (2020)
  - Total: 16
  - Density: 0.45/sq mi (0.17/km^{2})
- GNIS feature ID: 0472082

Odessa Township is a township in Jewell County, Kansas, United States. As of the 2020 census, its population was 16.

== Geography ==
Odessa Township covers an area of 35.88 square miles (92.94 square kilometers); of this, 0.01 square miles (0.02 square kilometers) or 0.02 percent is water. The stream of Porcupine Creek runs through this township.

=== Unincorporated communities ===
- Dentonia

(This list is based on USGS data and may include former settlements.)

=== Cemetery ===
Odessa Cemetery (south of Odessa United Methodist Church)

=== Adjacent townships ===
- Esbon Township (north)
- Limestone Township (northeast)
- Ionia Township (east)
- Athens Township (southeast)
- Erving Township (south)
- Lincoln Township, Smith County (southwest)
- Webster Township, Smith County (west)
- Oak Township, Smith County (northwest)
