= Bethany Township, Kansas =

Township in Osborne County, Kansas, U.S.

Bethany Township
- Township
- Location within Osborne County
- Coordinates: 39.524257°N 98.65557°W
- Country: United States
- State: Kansas
- County: Osborne

Area
  - Total: 36.058 sq mi (93.39 km^{2})
  - Land: 36.058 sq mi (93.39 km^{2})
  - Water: 0 sq mi (0 km^{2}) 0%
- Elevation: 1,519 ft (463 m)

Population (2020)
  - Total: 162
  - Density: 4.49/sq mi (1.73/km^{2})
- Time zone: UTC-6 (CST)
  - Summer (DST): UTC-5 (CDT)
- Area code: 785
- GNIS feature ID: 472280

Bethany Township is a township in Osborne County, Kansas, United States. As of the 2020 census, its population was 162.

== Geography ==
Bethany Township covers an area of 36.058 square miles (93.39 square kilometers). The North Fork Solomon River flows through it.

=== Communities ===
- Portis

=== Adjacent townships ===
- Garfield Township, Smith County (north)
- Lincoln Township, Smith County (northeast)
- Ross Township, Osborne County (east)
- Corinth Township, Osborne County (southeast)
- Penn Township, Osborne County (south)
- Lawrence Township, Osborne County (west)

== Transportation ==
=== Major highways ===
- US-24
- US-281
- K-9
