= Garfield Township, Ottawa County, Kansas =

Township in Ottawa County, Kansas, U.S.

Garfield Township
- Township
- Location within Ottawa County
- Coordinates: 39.171809°N 97.753022°W
- Country: United States
- State: Kansas
- County: Ottawa

Area
  - Total: 36.201 sq mi (93.76 km^{2})
  - Land: 36.18 sq mi (93.7 km^{2})
  - Water: 0.021 sq mi (0.054 km^{2}) 0.06%
- Elevation: 1,270 ft (390 m)

Population (2020)
  - Total: 79
  - Density: 2.2/sq mi (0.84/km^{2})
- Time zone: UTC-6 (CST)
  - Summer (DST): UTC-5 (CDT)
- Area code: 785
- GNIS feature ID: 476274

Garfield Township is a township in Ottawa County, Kansas, United States. As of the 2020 census, its population was 79.

== Geography ==
Garfield Township covers an area of 36.201 square miles (93.76 square kilometers). The Solomon River flows through it.

=== Communities ===
- Sumnerville

=== Adjacent townships ===
- Sheridan Township, Ottawa County (north)
- Logan Township, Ottawa County (northeast)
- Blaine Township, Ottawa County (east)
- Center Township, Ottawa County (south)
- Henry Township, Ottawa County (southwest)
- Fountain Township, Ottawa County (west)
- Stanton Township, Ottawa County (northwest)
