= May Louise Cowles =

American economist

- May Louise Cowles
- Born: September 25, 1892; Sibley, Kansas, U.S.
- Died: January 11, 1978 (aged 85); Madison, Wisconsin, U.S.

Academic background
- Education: University of Chicago; University of Wisconsin–Madison; Kansas State University

Academic work
- Discipline: Home Economics
- Institutions: University of Wisconsin–Madison

May Louise Cowles (September 25, 1892 – January 11, 1978) was an American economist, researcher, author, and advocate of Home Economics. She was a member of the faculty at the University of Wisconsin–Madison from 1915 to 1958. She had many submissions published in the Journal of Home Economics, the Journal of the American Dietetic Association, and Rural Sociology. She also produced several widely read pamphlets, including Meeting Housing Needs of Older People in Rural Areas (1957), and spoke at a string of national seminars to encourage the addition of family economics to home economics instruction across the United States.

Cowles "created some of the first family economics courses in the nation" at the collegiate level.

== Early life and education ==
Cowles was born on September 25, 1892, in Sibley, Kansas. She attended Kansas State Agricultural College where she earned a B.S. in home economics in 1912 and entered the University of Wisconsin–Madison in 1915 to earn her master's degree in home economics.

== Rise to prominence ==
From 1926 to 1929, Cowles studied for her Ph.D. in economics at the University of Chicago. Her Ph.D. dissertation investigated the economics of clothing consumption and whether consumer behavior could be classified according to "laws." One of her studies reported that during the time period, husbands spend more on clothing than their wives by 10%—a finding that was met with some ridicule in the press at the time. She also completed significant work in the study of home economics and its impact on rural families in the United States.

Kansas State University recognized her contributions to home economics and her participation in the field by awarding her the Distinguished Service Award for "outstanding achievement in home economics" in 1959.
