= Corinth Township, Kansas =

Township in Osborne County, Kansas, U.S.

Corinth Township
- Township
- Location within Osborne County
- Coordinates: 39.429897°N 98.537681°W
- Country: United States
- State: Kansas
- County: Osborne

Area
  - Total: 35.51 sq mi (92.0 km^{2})
  - Land: 35.447 sq mi (91.81 km^{2})
  - Water: 0.063 sq mi (0.16 km^{2}) 0.18%
- Elevation: 1,503 ft (458 m)

Population (2020)
  - Total: 40
  - Density: 1.1/sq mi (0.44/km^{2})
- Time zone: UTC-6 (CST)
  - Summer (DST): UTC-5 (CDT)
- Area code: 785
- GNIS feature ID: 472291

Corinth Township is a township in Osborne County, Kansas, United States. As of the 2020 census, its population was 40.

== Geography ==
Corinth Township covers an area of 35.51 square miles (92.0 square kilometers). Part of Waconda Lake lies within the township.

=== Communities ===
- Corinth

=== Adjacent townships ===
- Ross Township, Osborne County (north)
- Cawker Township, Mitchell County (northeast)
- Carr Creek Township, Mitchell County (east)
- Pittsburg Township, Mitchell County (southeast)
- Bloom Township, Osborne County (south)
- Hancock Township, Osborne County (southwest)
- Penn Township, Osborne County (west)
- Bethany Township, Osborne County (northwest)

== Transportation ==
=== Major highways ===
- K-181
