= Ross Township, Osborne County, Kansas =

Township in Osborne County, Kansas, U.S.

Ross Township
- Township
- Location within Osborne County
- Coordinates: 39.529738°N 98.538521°W
- Country: United States
- State: Kansas
- County: Osborne

Government
  - First District Commissioner: Craig Pottberg

Area
  - Total: 35.77 sq mi (92.6 km^{2})
  - Land: 35.494 sq mi (91.93 km^{2})
  - Water: 0.276 sq mi (0.71 km^{2}) 0.77%
- Elevation: 1,519 ft (463 m)

Population (2020)
  - Total: 874
  - Density: 24.6/sq mi (9.51/km^{2})
- Time zone: UTC-6 (CST)
  - Summer (DST): UTC-5 (CDT)
- Area code: 785
- GNIS feature ID: 472289

Ross Township is a township in Osborne County, Kansas, United States. As of the 2020 census, its population was 874.

== Geography ==
Ross Township covers an area of 35.77 square miles (92.6 square kilometers). The North Fork Solomon River flows into Waconda Lake in the township.

=== Communities ===
- Downs

=== Adjacent townships ===
- Lincoln Township, Smith County (north)
- Erving Township, Jewell County (northeast)
- Cawker Township, Mitchell County (east)
- Carr Creek Township, Mitchell County (southeast)
- Corinth Township, Osborne County (south)
- Penn Township, Osborne County (southwest)
- Bethany Township, Osborne County (west)

== Transportation ==
=== Major highways ===
- US-24
- K-9
- K-181
