= Hayes Township, Mitchell County, Kansas =

Township in Mitchell County, Kansas, U.S.

Hayes Township
- Township
- Location within Mitchell County
- Coordinates: 39.335847°N 98.31851°W
- Country: United States
- State: Kansas
- County: Mitchell

Area
  - Total: 36.017 sq mi (93.28 km^{2})
  - Land: 36.007 sq mi (93.26 km^{2})
  - Water: 0.01 sq mi (0.026 km^{2}) 0.03%

Population (2020)
  - Total: 30
  - Density: 0.83/sq mi (0.32/km^{2})
- Time zone: UTC-6 (CST)
  - Summer (DST): UTC-5 (CDT)
- Area code: 785

Hayes Township is a township in Mitchell County, Kansas, United States. As of the 2020 census, its population was 30.

== Geography ==
Hayes Township covers an area of 36.017 square miles (93.28 square kilometers).

=== Adjacent townships ===
- Walnut Creek Township, Mitchell County (north)
- Turkey Creek Township, Mitchell County (northeast)
- Center Township, Mitchell County (east)
- Round Springs Township, Mitchell County (southeast)
- Blue Hill Township, Mitchell County (south)
- Custer Township, Mitchell County (southwest)
- Pittsburg Township, Mitchell County (west)
- Carr Creek Township, Mitchell County (northwest)
