= Scott Township, Lincoln County, Kansas =

Township in Lincoln County, Kansas, U.S.

Scott Township
- Township
- Location in Lincoln County
- Coordinates: 39.175183°N 98.098254°W
- Country: United States
- State: Kansas
- County: Lincoln

Area
  - Total: 36.085 sq mi (93.46 km^{2})
  - Land: 36.043 sq mi (93.35 km^{2})
  - Water: 0.042 sq mi (0.11 km^{2}) 0.12%

Population (2020)
  - Total: 102
  - Density: 2.83/sq mi (1.09/km^{2})
- Time zone: UTC-6 (CST)
  - Summer (DST): UTC-5 (CDT)
- Area code: 785

Scott Township is a township in Lincoln County, Kansas, United States. As of the 2020 census, its population was 102.

== Geography ==
Scott Township covers an area of 36.085 square miles (93.46 square kilometers).

=== Communities ===
- part of Barnard

=== Adjacent townships ===
- Salt Creek Township, Mitchell County (north)
- Eureka Township, Mitchell County (northeast)
- Salt Creek Township, Lincoln County (east)
- Beaver Township, Lincoln County (south)
- Marion Township, Lincoln County (southwest)
- Battle Creek Township, Lincoln County (west)
- Round Springs Township, Mitchell County (northwest)

=== Major highways ===
- K-14
- K-284
