= Macyville, Kansas =

Ghost town in Cloud County, Kansas

Coordinates: 39°28′54″N 97°48′59″W

Macyville is a ghost town in Cloud County, Kansas, United States. It is located southwest of Concordia.

== History ==
The Macyville post office, originally called Ten Mile, was established in 1871. It was discontinued in 1905.

Macyville was named for its first postmaster, George W. Macy.
