= Lincoln Township, Smith County, Kansas =

Township in Smith County, Kansas, U.S.

Lincoln Township
- Township
- Location within Smith County
- Coordinates: 39.603463°N 98.555746°W
- Country: United States
- State: Kansas
- County: Smith
- Established: 1875

Government
  - Trustee: Bob Koops

Area
  - Total: 35.892 sq mi (92.96 km^{2})
  - Land: 35.836 sq mi (92.81 km^{2})
  - Water: 0.056 sq mi (0.15 km^{2}) 0.16%

Population (2020)
  - Total: 73
  - Density: 2.0/sq mi (0.79/km^{2})
- Time zone: UTC-6 (CST)
  - Summer (DST): UTC-5 (CDT)
- Area code: 785
- GNIS feature ID: 472060

Lincoln Township is a township in Smith County, Kansas, United States. As of the 2020 census, its population was 73.

== History ==
Lincoln Township was established in 1875 as one of the original nine townships of Smith County. It was originally called Holland Township but shortly afterwards changed to Lincoln Township. The first woman to settle in Smith County was Mary Peebles, who settled in what would become Lincoln Township in the fall of 1870. The first school in what would become Lincoln Township was built on July 1, 1873. Later, Garfield Township, Crystal Plains Township, and Webster Township would be created from parts of Lincoln Township.

== Geography ==
Lincoln Township covers an area of 35.892 square miles (92.96 square kilometers). Twelvemile Creek and Oak Creek flow through it.

=== Communities ===
- Dispatch

=== Adjacent townships ===
Webster Township, Smith County
| Crystal Plains Township, Smith County | northwest | north | northeast | Odessa Township, Jewell County |
| Garfield Township, Smith County | west | self | east | Erving Township, Jewell County |
| Bethany Township, Osborne County | southwest | south |
Ross Township, Osborne County

== Transportation ==
=== Major highways ===
- K-181

== Demographics ==
As of the 2020 census, there were 73 people and 21 households residing in the township. The population density was 2.0 people per square mile (0.77 people/km^{2}). There were 21 housing units. The racial makeup of the township was 95.9% White, 1.4% Native American, 1.4% from some other race, and 1.4% from two or more races. Hispanics or Latinos of any race were 4.1% of the population.

There were 21 households: 100% were married couples living together. The average family size was 3.95 people. 86.8% of people in the township older than 24 had a college degree, and the township had an employment rate of 100%.
