= Round Springs Township, Kansas =

Township in Mitchell County, Kansas, U.S.

Round Springs Township
- Township
- Location within Mitchell County
- Coordinates: 39.268646°N 98.217168°W
- Country: United States
- State: Kansas
- County: Mitchell

Area
  - Total: 35.863 sq mi (92.88 km^{2})
  - Land: 35.857 sq mi (92.87 km^{2})
  - Water: 0.008 sq mi (0.021 km^{2}) 0.02%

Population (2020)
  - Total: 24
  - Density: 0.67/sq mi (0.26/km^{2})
- Time zone: UTC-6 (CST)
  - Summer (DST): UTC-5 (CDT)
- Area code: 785

Round Springs Township is a township in Mitchell County, Kansas, United States. As of the 2020 census, its population was 24.

== Geography ==
Round Springs Township covers an area of 35.863 square miles (92.88 square kilometers).

=== Adjacent townships ===
- Center Township, Mitchell County (north)
- Bloomfield Township, Mitchell County (northeast)
- Salt Creek Township, Mitchell County (east)
- Scott Township, Lincoln County (southeast)
- Battle Creek Township, Lincoln County (south)
- Orange Township, Lincoln County (southwest)
- Blue Hill Township, Mitchell County (west)
- Hayes Township, Mitchell County (northwest)

=== Major highways ===
- K-14
