= Arion Township, Kansas =

Arion Township
- Township
- Location in Cloud County
- Coordinates: 39°30′15″N 097°46′01″W
- Country: United States
- State: Kansas
- County: Cloud

Area
  - Total: 36.21 sq mi (93.78 km^{2})
  - Land: 36.19 sq mi (93.73 km^{2})
  - Water: 0.019 sq mi (0.05 km^{2}) 0.05%
- Elevation: 1,562 ft (476 m)

Population (2020)
  - Total: 112
  - Density: 3.09/sq mi (1.19/km^{2})
- GNIS feature ID: 0473304

Arion Township is a township in Cloud County, Kansas, United States. As of the 2020 census, its population was 112.

== Geography ==
Arion Township covers an area of 36.21 square miles (93.8 km^{2}) and contains no incorporated settlements. According to the USGS, it contains two cemeteries: Morrison and Wilcox.

The stream of Coal Creek runs through this township.
