= Glen Elder Township, Kansas =

Township in Mitchell County, Kansas, U.S.

Glen Elder Township
- Township
- Location within Mitchell County
- Coordinates: 39°31′26″N 98°19′14″W, 39°29′23″N 98°22′33″W, 39°31′58″N 98°22′33″W, 39°29′25″N 98°19′11″W
- Country: United States
- State: Kansas
- County: Mitchell

Area
  - Total: 36.057 sq mi (93.39 km^{2})
  - Land: 30.352 sq mi (78.61 km^{2})
  - Water: 5.705 sq mi (14.78 km^{2}) 15.82%
- Elevation: 1,470 ft (448 m)

Population (2020)
  - Total: 432
  - Density: 14.2/sq mi (5.50/km^{2})
- Time zone: UTC-6 (CST)
  - Summer (DST): UTC-5 (CDT)
- Area code: 785

Glen Elder Township is a township in Mitchell County, Kansas, United States.

== Geography ==
Glen Elder Township covers an area of 36.057 square miles (93.39 square kilometers). The Solomon River flows through it, and parts of Waconda Lake lie within the township.

=== Communities ===
- Glen Elder

=== Adjacent townships ===
- Athens Township, Jewell County (north)
- Browns Creek Township, Jewell County (northeast)
- Solomon Rapids Township, Mitchell County (east)
- Turkey Creek Township, Mitchell County (southeast)
- Walnut Creek Township, Mitchell County (south)
- Carr Creek Township, Mitchell County (southwest)
- Cawker Township, Mitchell County (west)

=== Major highways ===
- US-24
- K-9
- K-128
