= Centre Township =

Centre Township may refer to the following townships in the United States:

- Centre Township, St. Joseph County, Indiana
- Centre Township, Marion County, Kansas
- Centre Township, New Jersey
- Centre Township, Berks County, Pennsylvania
- Centre Township, Perry County, Pennsylvania
- Centre Township, a township that existed in Columbia County, Pennsylvania prior to its splitting into North Centre and South Centre Townships

== See also ==
- Center Township (disambiguation)
