= Bloom Township, Osborne County, Kansas =

Township in Osborne County, Kansas, U.S.

Bloom Township
- Township
- Location within Osborne County
- Coordinates: 39.320821°N 98.539828°W
- Country: United States
- State: Kansas
- County: Osborne

Area
  - Total: 53.919 sq mi (139.65 km^{2})
  - Land: 53.908 sq mi (139.62 km^{2})
  - Water: 0.011 sq mi (0.028 km^{2}) 0.02%
- Elevation: 1,791 ft (546 m)

Population (2020)
  - Total: 80
  - Density: 1.5/sq mi (0.57/km^{2})
- Time zone: UTC-6 (CST)
  - Summer (DST): UTC-5 (CDT)
- Area code: 785
- GNIS feature ID: 472292

Bloom Township is a township in Osborne County, Kansas, United States. As of the 2020 census, its population was 80.

== Geography ==
Bloom Township covers an area of 53.919 square miles (139.65 square kilometers).

=== Adjacent townships ===
- Corinth Township, Osborne County (north)
- Carr Creek Township, Mitchell County (northeast)
- Pittsburg Township, Mitchell County (east)
- Custer Township, Mitchell County (southeast)
- Delhi Township, Osborne County (south)
- Winfield Township, Osborne County (southwest)
- Hancock Township, Osborne County (west)
- Penn Township, Osborne County (northwest)

== Transportation ==
=== Major highways ===
- K-181
