= Salt Creek Township, Mitchell County, Kansas =

Township in Mitchell County, Kansas, U.S.

Salt Creek Township
- Township
- Location within Mitchell County
- Coordinates: 39.262497°N 98.098385°W
- Country: United States
- State: Kansas
- County: Mitchell

Area
  - Total: 35.894 sq mi (92.97 km^{2})
  - Land: 35.81 sq mi (92.7 km^{2})
  - Water: 0.084 sq mi (0.22 km^{2}) 0.23%

Population (2020)
  - Total: 16
  - Density: 0.45/sq mi (0.17/km^{2})
- Time zone: UTC-6 (CST)
  - Summer (DST): UTC-5 (CDT)
- Area code: 785

Salt Creek Township is a township in Mitchell County, Kansas, United States. As of the 2020 census, its population was 16.

== Geography ==
Salt Creek Township covers an area of 35.894 square miles (92.97 square kilometers).

=== Adjacent townships ===
- Bloomfield Township, Mitchell County (north)
- Logan Township, Mitchell County (northeast)
- Eureka Township, Mitchell County (east)
- Salt Creek Township, Lincoln County (southeast)
- Scott Township, Lincoln County (south)
- Battle Creek Township, Lincoln County (southwest)
- Round Springs Township, Mitchell County (west)
- Center Township, Mitchell County (northwest)

=== Major highways ===
- K-14
