= Walnut Creek Township, Kansas =

Township in Mitchell County, Kansas, U.S.

Walnut Creek Township
- Township
- Location within Mitchell County
- Coordinates: 39.429762°N 98.316171°W
- Country: United States
- State: Kansas
- County: Mitchell

Area
  - Total: 36.063 sq mi (93.40 km^{2})
  - Land: 34.102 sq mi (88.32 km^{2})
  - Water: 1.961 sq mi (5.08 km^{2}) 5.44%

Population (2020)
  - Total: 31
  - Density: 0.91/sq mi (0.35/km^{2})
- Time zone: UTC-6 (CST)
  - Summer (DST): UTC-5 (CDT)
- Area code: 785

Walnut Creek Township is a township in Mitchell County, Kansas, United States. As of the 2020 census, its population was 31.

== Geography ==
Walnut Creek Township covers an area of 36.063 square miles (93.40 square kilometers). The Solomon River flows through it, and Waconda Lake lies within the township.

=== Adjacent townships ===
- Glen Elder Township, Mitchell County (north)
- Solomon Rapids Township, Mitchell County (northeast)
- Turkey Creek Township, Mitchell County (east)
- Center Township, Mitchell County (southeast)
- Hayes Township, Mitchell County (south)
- Pittsburg Township, Mitchell County (southwest)
- Carr Creek Township, Mitchell County (west)
- Cawker Township, Mitchell County (northwest)
