= Beloit Township, Kansas =

Township in Mitchell County, Kansas, U.S.

Beloit Township
- Township
- Location within Mitchell County
- Coordinates: 39.429648°N 98.104709°W
- Country: United States
- State: Kansas
- County: Mitchell

Area
  - Total: 32.241 sq mi (83.50 km^{2})
  - Land: 32.237 sq mi (83.49 km^{2})
  - Water: 0.004 sq mi (0.010 km^{2}) 0.01%

Population (2020)
  - Total: 176
  - Density: 5.46/sq mi (2.11/km^{2})
- Time zone: UTC-6 (CST)
  - Summer (DST): UTC-5 (CDT)
- Area code: 785

Beloit Township is a township in Mitchell County, Kansas, United States. As of the 2020 census, its population was 176.

== Geography ==
Beloit Township covers an area of 32.241 square miles (83.50 square kilometers). The Solomon River flows through it.

=== Adjacent townships ===
- Plum Creek Township, Mitchell County (north)
- Lulu Township, Mitchell County (northeast)
- Asherville Township, Mitchell County (east)
- Logan Township, Mitchell County (southeast)
- Bloomfield Township, Mitchell County (south)
- Center Township, Mitchell County (southwest)
- Turkey Creek Township, Mitchell County (west)
- Solomon Rapids Township, Mitchell County (northwest)

=== Major highways ===
- US-24
- K-9
- K-14
