= Orange Township, Lincoln County, Kansas =

Township in Lincoln County, Kansas, U.S.

Orange Township
- Township
- Location in Lincoln County
- Coordinates: 39.184091°N 98.31427°W
- Country: United States
- State: Kansas
- County: Lincoln

Area
  - Total: 36.149 sq mi (93.63 km^{2})
  - Land: 36.099 sq mi (93.50 km^{2})
  - Water: 0.05 sq mi (0.13 km^{2}) 0.14%

Population (2020)
  - Total: 47
  - Density: 1.3/sq mi (0.50/km^{2})
- Time zone: UTC-6 (CST)
  - Summer (DST): UTC-5 (CDT)
- Area code: 785

Orange Township is a township in Lincoln County, Kansas, United States. As of the 2020 census, its population was 47.

== Geography ==
Orange Township covers an area of 36.149 square miles (93.63 square kilometers).

=== Communities ===
- Ash Grove

=== Adjacent townships ===
- Blue Hill Township, Mitchell County (north)
- Round Springs Township, Mitchell County (northeast)
- Battle Creek Township, Lincoln County (east)
- Grant Township, Lincoln County (south)
- Hanover Township, Lincoln County (southwest)
- Cedron Township, Lincoln County (west)
- Custer Township, Mitchell County (northwest)
