= Lincoln Township, Cloud County, Kansas =

Lincoln Township
- Township
- Location in Cloud County
- Coordinates: 39°33′18″N 097°39′48″W
- Country: United States
- State: Kansas
- County: Cloud

Area
  - Total: 23.90 sq mi (61.91 km^{2})
  - Land: 23.62 sq mi (61.17 km^{2})
  - Water: 0.29 sq mi (0.75 km^{2}) 1.21%
- Elevation: 1,457 ft (444 m)

Population (2020)
  - Total: 363
  - Density: 15.4/sq mi (5.93/km^{2})
- GNIS feature ID: 0473332

Lincoln Township is a township in Cloud County, Kansas, United States. As of the 2020 census, its population was 363.

== History ==
Lincoln Township was organized in 1873.

== Geography ==
Lincoln Township covers an area of 23.91 square miles (61.9 km^{2}) surrounding the county seat of Concordia.

The stream of Wolf Creek runs through this township.
