= Erving Township, Kansas =

Erving Township
- Township
- Location in Jewell County
- Coordinates: 39°36′08″N 98°27′16″W
- Country: United States
- State: Kansas
- County: Jewell

Area
  - Total: 35.9 sq mi (93.1 km^{2})
  - Land: 35.92 sq mi (93.03 km^{2})
  - Water: 0.027 sq mi (0.07 km^{2}) 0.08%
- Elevation: 1,578 ft (481 m)

Population (2020)
  - Total: 37
  - Density: 1.0/sq mi (0.40/km^{2})
- GNIS feature ID: 0472084

Erving Township is a township in Jewell County, Kansas, United States. As of the 2020 census, its population was 37.

== History ==
Erving Township was organized in 1872. It was named for one Dr. Erving, an early settler and native of Hiawatha.

== Geography ==
Erving Township covers an area of 35.94 square miles (93.1 square kilometers); of this, 0.03 square miles (0.07 square kilometers) or 0.08 percent is water.

=== Adjacent townships ===
- Odessa Township (north)
- Ionia Township (northeast)
- Athens Township (east)
- Cawker Township, Mitchell County (south)
- Ross Township, Osborne County (southwest)
- Lincoln Township, Smith County (west)
- Webster Township, Smith County (northwest)

=== Cemeteries ===
The township contains two cemeteries: Reformed and Rooker.
