= Penn Township, Kansas =

Township in Osborne County, Kansas, U.S.

Penn Township
- Township
- Location within Osborne County
- Coordinates: 39.432782°N 98.673383°W
- Country: United States
- State: Kansas
- County: Osborne

Government
  - Second District Commissioner: Troy Schaefer

Area
  - Total: 46.096 sq mi (119.39 km^{2})
  - Land: 46.073 sq mi (119.33 km^{2})
  - Water: 0.023 sq mi (0.060 km^{2}) 0.05%
- Elevation: 1,539 ft (469 m)

Population (2020)
  - Total: 145
  - Density: 3.15/sq mi (1.22/km^{2})
- Time zone: UTC-6 (CST)
  - Summer (DST): UTC-5 (CDT)
- Area code: 785
- GNIS feature ID: 472283

Penn Township is a township in Osborne County, Kansas, United States. As of the 2020 census, its population was 145. The city of Osborne is surrounded by the township but is governmentally independent from it.

== History ==
Penn Township was established by settlers from Pennsylvania who had moved into Kansas, and establishing the city of Osborne in 1871. They named the township after William Penn, the namesake and founder of Pennsylvania.

== Geography ==
Penn Township covers an area of 46.096 square miles (119.39 square kilometers). The South Fork Solomon River flows through it.

=== Adjacent townships ===
- Bethany Township, Osborne County (north)
- Ross Township, Osborne County (northeast)
- Corinth Township, Osborne County (east)
- Bloom Township, Osborne County (southeast)
- Hancock Township, Osborne County (south)
- Independence Township, Osborne County (southwest)
- Tilden Township, Osborne County (west)
- Lawrence Township, Osborne County (northwest)

== Transportation ==
Osborne Municipal Airport is located within the township and services it.

=== Major highways ===
- US-24
- US-281
