= Nelson Township, Kansas =

Nelson Township
- Township
- Location in Cloud County
- Coordinates: 39°31′30″N 097°32′21″W
- Country: United States
- State: Kansas
- County: Cloud

Area
  - Total: 35.23 sq mi (91.25 km^{2})
  - Land: 35.23 sq mi (91.25 km^{2})
  - Water: 0 sq mi (0 km^{2}) 0%
- Elevation: 1,417 ft (432 m)

Population (2020)
  - Total: 106
  - Density: 3.01/sq mi (1.16/km^{2})
- GNIS feature ID: 0473337

Nelson Township is a township in Cloud County, Kansas, United States. As of the 2020 census, its population was 106.

== History ==
Nelson Township was organized in 1872.

== Geography ==
Nelson Township covers an area of 35.23 square miles (91.2 km^{2}) and contains no incorporated settlements. According to the USGS, it contains two cemeteries: Nelson and Rice.
