= Athens Township, Kansas =

Athens Township
- Township
- Location in Jewell County
- Coordinates: 39°36′05″N 98°19′51″W
- Country: United States
- State: Kansas
- County: Jewell

Area
  - Total: 39.48 sq mi (102.24 km^{2})
  - Land: 39.48 sq mi (102.24 km^{2})
  - Water: 0 sq mi (0 km^{2}) 0%
- Elevation: 1,503 ft (458 m)

Population (2020)
  - Total: 50
  - Density: 1.3/sq mi (0.49/km^{2})
- GNIS feature ID: 0472091

Athens Township is a township in Jewell County, Kansas, United States. As of the 2020 census, its population was 50.

== Geography ==
Athens Township covers an area of 39.47 square miles (102.24 square kilometers). The streams of Ash Creek, Middle Limestone Creek and West Limestone Creek run through this township.

=== Adjacent townships ===
- Ionia Township (north)
- Calvin Township (northeast)
- Browns Creek Township (east)
- Glen Elder Township, Mitchell County (south)
- Cawker Township, Mitchell County (southwest)
- Erving Township (west)
- Odessa Township (northwest)

=== Cemeteries ===
The township contains one cemetery, Athens.

=== Major highways ===
- K-128

=== Airports and landing strips ===
- Rose Port Airport
