= Solomon Rapids Township, Kansas =

Township in Mitchell County, Kansas, U.S.

Solomon Rapids Township
- Township
- Location within Mitchell County
- Coordinates: 39.51729°N 98.199978°W
- Country: United States
- State: Kansas
- County: Mitchell

Area
  - Total: 35.454 sq mi (91.83 km^{2})
  - Land: 35.434 sq mi (91.77 km^{2})
  - Water: 0.02 sq mi (0.052 km^{2}) 0.06%

Population (2020)
  - Total: 60
  - Density: 1.7/sq mi (0.65/km^{2})
- Time zone: UTC-6 (CST)
  - Summer (DST): UTC-5 (CDT)
- Area code: 785

Solomon Rapids Township is a township in Mitchell County, Kansas, United States. As of the 2020 census, its population was 60.

== Geography ==
Solomon Rapids Township covers an area of 35.454 square miles (91.83 square kilometers).

=== Adjacent townships ===
- Browns Creek Township, Jewell County (north)
- Prairie Township, Jewell County (northeast)
- Plum Creek Township, Mitchell County (east)
- Beloit Township, Mitchell County (southeast)
- Turkey Creek Township, Mitchell County (south)
- Walnut Creek Township, Mitchell County (southwest)
- Glen Elder Township, Mitchell County (west)

=== Major highways ===
- US-24
- K-9
