= Fountain Township, Kansas =

Township in Ottawa County, Kansas, U.S.

Fountain Township
- Township
- Location within Ottawa County
- Coordinates: 39.168395°N 97.883143°W
- Country: United States
- State: Kansas
- County: Ottawa

Area
  - Total: 36.181 sq mi (93.71 km^{2})
  - Land: 36.179 sq mi (93.70 km^{2})
  - Water: 0.002 sq mi (0.0052 km^{2}) 0.01%
- Elevation: 1,339 ft (408 m)

Population (2020)
  - Total: 160
  - Density: 4.4/sq mi (1.7/km^{2})
- Time zone: UTC-6 (CST)
  - Summer (DST): UTC-5 (CDT)
- Area code: 785
- GNIS feature ID: 476265

Fountain Township is a township in Ottawa County, Kansas, United States. As of the 2020 census, its population was 160.

== Geography ==
Fountain Township covers an area of 36.181 square miles (93.71 square kilometers).

=== Communities ===
- Ada

=== Adjacent townships ===
- Stanton Township, Ottawa County (north)
- Sheridan Township, Ottawa County (northeast)
- Garfield Township, Ottawa County (east)
- Center Township, Ottawa County (southeast)
- Henry Township, Ottawa County (south)
- Logan Township, Lincoln County (southwest)
- Salt Creek Township, Lincoln County (west)
- Eureka Township, Mitchell County (northwest)
