= Sibley Township =

Sibley Township is the name of several places in the United States:

- Sibley Township, Cloud County, Kansas
- Sibley Township, Crow Wing County, Minnesota
- Sibley Township, Sibley County, Minnesota
- Sibley Township, Kidder County, North Dakota
