= Blue Hill Township, Kansas =

Township in Mitchell County, Kansas, U.S.

Blue Hill Township
- Township
- Location within Mitchell County
- Coordinates: 39.256511°N 98.329203°W
- Country: United States
- State: Kansas
- County: Mitchell

Area
  - Total: 36.137 sq mi (93.59 km^{2})
  - Land: 36.094 sq mi (93.48 km^{2})
  - Water: 0.043 sq mi (0.11 km^{2}) 0.12%

Population (2020)
  - Total: 33
  - Density: 0.91/sq mi (0.35/km^{2})
- Time zone: UTC-6 (CST)
  - Summer (DST): UTC-5 (CDT)
- Area code: 785

Blue Hill Township is a township in Mitchell County, Kansas, United States. As of the 2020 census, its population was 33.

== Geography ==
Blue Hill Township covers an area of 36.137 square miles (93.59 square kilometers).

=== Adjacent townships ===
- Hayes Township, Mitchell County (north)
- Center Township, Mitchell County (northeast)
- Round Springs Township, Mitchell County (east)
- Battle Creek Township, Lincoln County (southeast)
- Orange Township, Lincoln County (south)
- Cedron Township, Lincoln County (southwest)
- Custer Township, Mitchell County (west)
- Pittsburg Township, Mitchell County (northwest)
