= Prairie Township, Jewell County, Kansas =

Prairie Township
- Township
- Location in Jewell County
- Coordinates: 39°36′25″N 98°05′26″W
- Country: United States
- State: Kansas
- County: Jewell

Area
  - Total: 37.05 sq mi (95.95 km^{2})
  - Land: 37.04 sq mi (95.94 km^{2})
  - Water: 0.0039 sq mi (0.01 km^{2}) 0.01%
- Elevation: 1,535 ft (468 m)

Population (2020)
  - Total: 139
  - Density: 3.75/sq mi (1.45/km^{2})
- GNIS feature ID: 0472108

Prairie Township is a township in Jewell County, Kansas, United States. As of the 2020 census, its population was 139.

== Geography ==
Prairie Township covers an area of 37.05 square miles (95.95 square kilometers); of this, 0.01 square miles (0.01 square kilometers) or 0.01 percent is water. The streams of Dry Creek, Dry Creek, East Buffalo Creek, Spring Creek and West Buffalo Creek run through this township.

=== Communities ===
- Randall

=== Adjacent townships ===
- Buffalo Township (north)
- Vicksburg Township (northeast)
- Allen Township (east)
- Plum Creek Township, Mitchell County (south)
- Solomon Rapids Township, Mitchell County (southwest)
- Browns Creek Township (west)

=== Cemeteries ===
The township contains two cemeteries: Pleasant Prairie and Star.

=== Major highways ===
- K-14
- K-28
