= Salt Creek Township, Lincoln County, Kansas =

Township in Lincoln County, Kansas, U.S.

Salt Creek Township
- Township
- Location in Lincoln County
- Coordinates: 39.182453°N 97.983894°W
- Country: United States
- State: Kansas
- County: Lincoln

Area
  - Total: 36.05 sq mi (93.4 km^{2})
  - Land: 36.036 sq mi (93.33 km^{2})
  - Water: 0.014 sq mi (0.036 km^{2}) 0.04%

Population (2020)
  - Total: 47
  - Density: 1.3/sq mi (0.50/km^{2})
- Time zone: UTC-6 (CST)
  - Summer (DST): UTC-5 (CDT)
- Area code: 785

Salt Creek Township is a township in Lincoln County, Kansas, United States. As of the 2020 census, its population was 47.

== Geography ==
Salt Creek Township covers an area of 36.05 square miles (93.4 square kilometers).

=== Communities ===
- part of Barnard

=== Adjacent townships ===
- Eureka Township, Mitchell County (north)
- Stanton Township, Ottawa County (northeast)
- Fountain Township, Ottawa County (east)
- Logan Township, Lincoln County (south)
- Beaver Township, Lincoln County (southwest)
- Scott Township, Lincoln County (west)
- Salt Creek Township, Mitchell County (northwest)

=== Major highways ===
- K-284
