= Cedron Township, Kansas =

Township in Lincoln County, Kansas, U.S.

Cedron Township
- Township
- Location in Lincoln County
- Coordinates: 39.175615°N 98.433602°W
- Country: United States
- State: Kansas
- County: Lincoln

Area
  - Total: 36.301 sq mi (94.02 km^{2})
  - Land: 36.273 sq mi (93.95 km^{2})
  - Water: 0.028 sq mi (0.073 km^{2}) 0.08%

Population (2020)
  - Total: 41
  - Density: 1.1/sq mi (0.44/km^{2})
- Time zone: UTC-6 (CST)
  - Summer (DST): UTC-5 (CDT)
- Area code: 785

Cedron Township is a township in Lincoln County, Kansas, United States. As of the 2020 census, its population was 41.

== Geography ==
Cedron Township covers an area of 36.301 square miles (94.02 square kilometers).

=== Adjacent townships ===
- Custer Township, Mitchell County (north)
- Blue Hill Township, Mitchell County (northeast)
- Orange Township, Lincoln County (east)
- Hanover Township, Lincoln County (south)
- Fairview Township, Russell County (southwest)
- Delhi Township, Osborne County (west)

=== Major highways ===
- K-181
