= Turkey Creek Township, Mitchell County, Kansas =

Township in Mitchell County, Kansas, U.S.

Turkey Creek Township
- Township
- Location within Mitchell County
- Coordinates: 39.429944°N 98.200252°W
- Country: United States
- State: Kansas
- County: Mitchell

Area
  - Total: 35.702 sq mi (92.47 km^{2})
  - Land: 35.648 sq mi (92.33 km^{2})
  - Water: 0.054 sq mi (0.14 km^{2}) 0.15%

Population (2020)
  - Total: 118
  - Density: 3.31/sq mi (1.28/km^{2})
- Time zone: UTC-6 (CST)
  - Summer (DST): UTC-5 (CDT)
- Area code: 785

Turkey Creek Township is a township in Mitchell County, Kansas, United States. As of the 2020 census, its population was 118.

== Geography ==
Turkey Creek Township covers an area of 35.702 square miles (92.47 square kilometers). The Solomon River flows through it.

=== Communities ===
- Solomon Rapids

=== Adjacent townships ===
- Solomon Rapids Township, Mitchell County (north)
- Plum Creek Township, Mitchell County (northeast)
- Beloit Township, Mitchell County (east)
- Bloomfield Township, Mitchell County (southeast)
- Center Township, Mitchell County (south)
- Hayes Township, Mitchell County (southwest)
- Walnut Creek Township, Mitchell County (west)
- Glen Elder Township, Mitchell County (northwest)

=== Major highways ===
- US-24
- K-9
