= Cloud County, Kansas =

County in Kansas, United States

- County
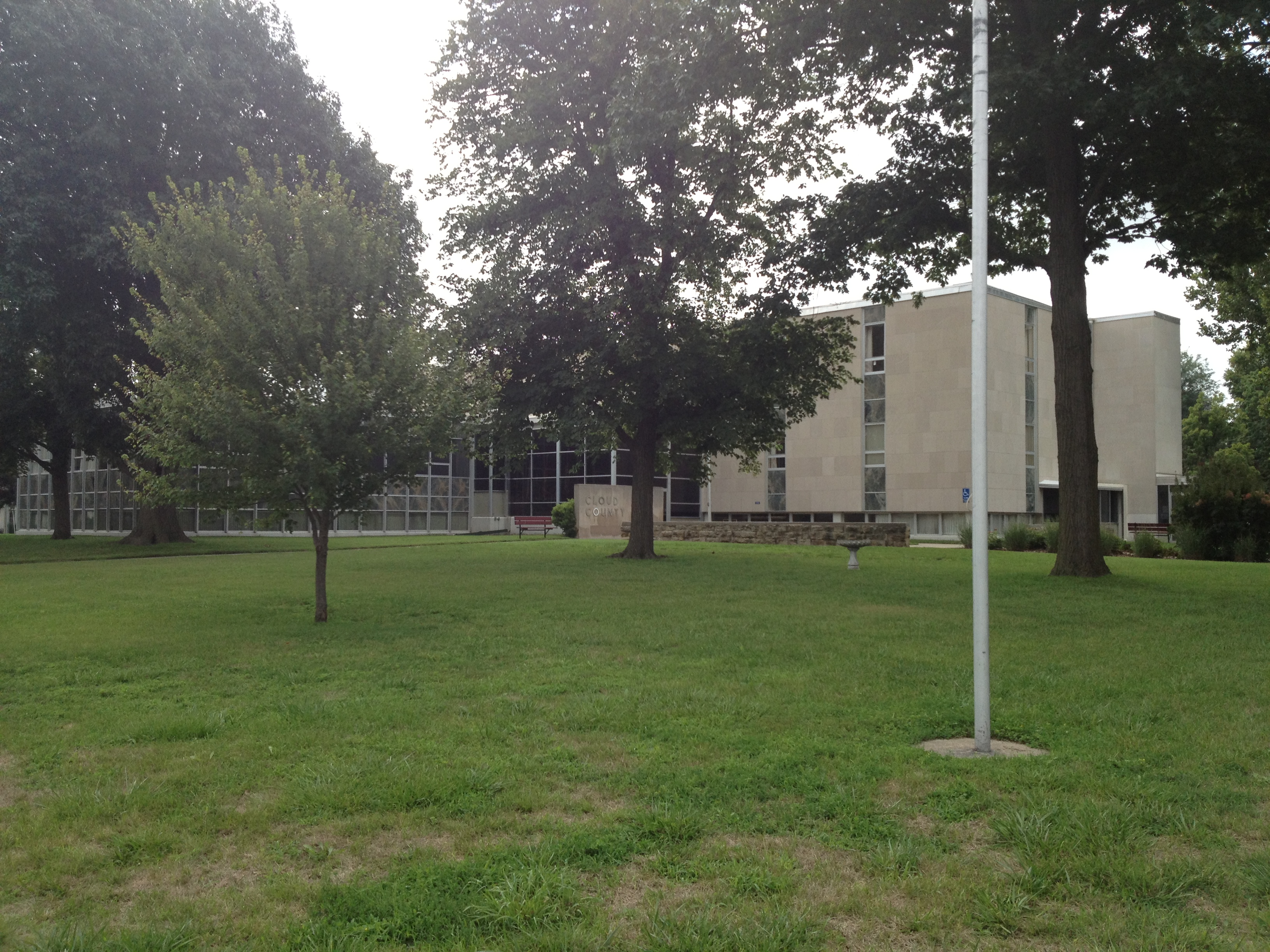
- Cloud County Courthouse in Concordia (2013)

- Location within the U.S. state of Kansas
- Country: United States
- State: Kansas
- Founded: March 27, 1867
- Named for: William F. Cloud
- Seat: Concordia
- Largest city: Concordia

Area
  - Total: 718 sq mi (1,860 km^{2})
  - Land: 715 sq mi (1,850 km^{2})
  - Water: 2.6 sq mi (6.7 km^{2}) 0.4%

Population (2020)
  - Total: 9,032
  - Estimate (2025): 8,833 ▼
  - Density: 12.6/sq mi (4.9/km^{2})
- Time zone: UTC−6 (Central)
  - Summer (DST): UTC−5 (CDT)
- Area code: 785
- Congressional district: 1st
- Website: cloudcountyks.org

Cloud County is a county located in the U.S. state of Kansas. Its county seat and most populous city is Concordia. As of the 2020 census, the county population was 9,032. The county was named after William Cloud, an officer in the American Civil War.

== History ==
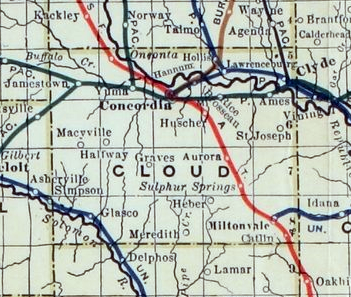
1915 Railroad Map of Cloud County

=== Early history ===
For many millennia, the Great Plains of North America was inhabited by nomadic Native Americans. From the 16th century to 18th century, the Kingdom of France claimed ownership of large parts of North America. In 1762, after the French and Indian War, France secretly ceded New France to Spain, per the Treaty of Fontainebleau.

=== 19th century ===
In 1802, Spain returned most of the land to France, while retaining title to approximately 7,500 square miles. In 1803, most of the land for modern day Kansas was acquired by the United States from France as part of the 828,000 square mile Louisiana Purchase for 2.83 cents per acre.

In 1854, the Kansas Territory was organized, then in 1861 Kansas became the 34th U.S. state. In 1867, Cloud County was established.

Cloud County was originally named Shirley County, but civic leaders feared that sounded too much like the name of a prostitute. It was then renamed "Cloud" county in honor of Colonel William F. Cloud.

Cloud County was formed from the existing Washington County, Kansas in a joint convention with Republic and Cloud counties. The county was legally organized on September 6, 1866, with Elk Creek designated as the temporary county seat.

In 1887, Atchison, Topeka and Santa Fe Railway built a branch line from Neva (3 miles west of Strong City) to Superior, Nebraska. This branch line connected Strong City, Neva, Rockland, Diamond Springs, Burdick, Lost Springs, Jacobs, Hope, Navarre, Enterprise, Abilene, Talmage, Manchester, Longford, Oak Hill, Miltonvale, Aurora, Huscher, Concordia, Kackley, Courtland, Webber, Superior. At some point, the line from Neva to Lost Springs was pulled but the right of way has not been abandoned. This branch line was originally called "Strong City and Superior line" but later the name was shortened to the "Strong City line". In 1996, the Atchison, Topeka and Santa Fe Railway merged with Burlington Northern Railroad and renamed to the current BNSF Railway. Most locals still refer to this railroad as the "Santa Fe".

== Geography ==
According to the U.S. Census Bureau, the county has a total area of 718 square miles (1,860 km^{2}), of which 715 square miles (1,850 km^{2}) is land and 2.6 square miles (6.7 km^{2}) (0.4%) is water.

=== Geographic features ===
The Republican River passes through the county, entering from Republic County to the north and exiting to Clay County to the east. The Solomon River traverses the southwestern portion of the county, going from Mitchell County to Ottawa County. Jamestown Lake lies partially in the northwestern part of the county and partially in southwestern Republic County.

=== Major highways ===
Cloud County is bisected from north to south by U.S. Route 81, which runs through the town of Concordia and connects north to Belleville, Kansas or south to Salina, Kansas. The southern part of the county also has U.S. Route 24, connecting Clay Center, Kansas from the east and Beloit, Kansas to the west.

There are four other state highways in the county: K-9, K-28, K-189, and K-194.

=== Adjacent counties ===
- Republic County (north)
- Washington County (northeast)
- Clay County (east)
- Ottawa County (south)
- Mitchell County (west)
- Jewell County (northwest)

== Demographics ==
Historical population
Census	Pop.	Note	%±
1870	2,323		—
1880	15,343		560.5%
1890	19,295		25.8%
1900	18,071		−6.3%
1910	18,388		1.8%
1920	17,714		−3.7%
1930	18,006		1.6%
1940	17,247		−4.2%
1950	16,104		−6.6%
1960	14,407		−10.5%
1970	13,466		−6.5%
1980	12,494		−7.2%
1990	11,023		−11.8%
2000	10,268		−6.8%
2010	9,533		−7.2%
2020	9,032		−5.3%
2025 (est.)	8,833	▼	−2.2%
U.S. Decennial Census; 1790–1960 1900–1990; 1990–2000 2010–2020

=== Racial and ethnic composition ===
Cloud County, Kansas – Racial and ethnic composition Note: the US Census treats Hispanic/Latino as an ethnic category. This table excludes Latinos from the racial categories and assigns them to a separate category. Hispanics/Latinos may be of any race.
Race / Ethnicity (NH = Non-Hispanic)	Pop 1980	Pop 1990	Pop 2000	Pop 2010	Pop 2020	% 1980	% 1990	% 2000	% 2010	% 2020
White alone (NH)	12,399	10,888	10,058	9,035	8,235	99.24%	98.78%	97.95%	94.78%	91.18%
Black or African American alone (NH)	18	36	34	49	123	0.14%	0.33%	0.33%	0.51%	1.36%
Native American or Alaska Native alone (NH)	6	15	23	24	40	0.05%	0.14%	0.22%	0.25%	0.44%
Asian alone (NH)	15	5	26	20	40	0.12%	0.05%	0.25%	0.21%	0.44%
Native Hawaiian or Pacific Islander alone (NH)	x	x	0	1	4	x	x	0.00%	0.01%	0.04%
Other race alone (NH)	6	3	2	14	11	0.05%	0.03%	0.02%	0.15%	0.12%
Mixed race or Multiracial (NH)	x	x	63	107	260	x	x	0.61%	1.12%	2.88%
Hispanic or Latino (any race)	50	76	62	283	319	0.40%	0.69%	0.60%	2.97%	3.53%
Total	12,494	11,023	10,268	9,533	9,032	100.00%	100.00%	100.00%	100.00%	100.00%

=== 2020 census ===
As of the 2020 census, the county had a population of 9,032. The median age was 40.8 years. 22.6% of residents were under the age of 18 and 22.3% of residents were 65 years of age or older. For every 100 females there were 101.5 males, and for every 100 females age 18 and over there were 99.1 males age 18 and over. 55.7% of residents lived in urban areas, while 44.3% lived in rural areas.

The racial makeup of the county was 92.3% White, 1.4% Black or African American, 0.5% American Indian and Alaska Native, 0.4% Asian, 0.1% Native Hawaiian and Pacific Islander, 0.9% from some other race, and 4.4% from two or more races. Hispanic or Latino residents of any race comprised 3.5% of the population.

There were 3,665 households in the county, of which 27.7% had children under the age of 18 living with them and 23.6% had a female householder with no spouse or partner present. About 31.6% of all households were made up of individuals and 15.3% had someone living alone who was 65 years of age or older.

There were 4,503 housing units, of which 18.6% were vacant. Among occupied housing units, 72.3% were owner-occupied and 27.7% were renter-occupied. The homeowner vacancy rate was 4.6% and the rental vacancy rate was 17.7%.

=== 2000 census ===
As of the 2000 census, there were 10,268 people, 4,163 households, and 2,697 families residing in the county. The population density was 14 people per square mile (5.4 people/km^{2}). There were 4,838 housing units at an average density of 7 per square mile (2.7/km^{2}). The racial makeup of the county was 98.30% White, 0.34% Black or African American, 0.25% Native American, 0.25% Asian, 0.13% from other races, and 0.73% from two or more races. Hispanic or Latino of any race were 0.60% of the population.

There were 4,163 households, out of which 27.10% had children under the age of 18 living with them, 55.10% were married couples living together, 6.60% had a female householder with no husband present, and 35.20% were non-families. 30.80% of all households were made up of individuals, and 15.90% had someone living alone who was 65 years of age or older. The average household size was 2.31 and the average family size was 2.89.

In the county, the population was spread out, with 22.40% under the age of 18, 10.40% from 18 to 24, 21.90% from 25 to 44, 22.20% from 45 to 64, and 23.20% who were 65 years of age or older. The median age was 41 years. For every 100 females there were 90.60 males. For every 100 females age 18 and over, there were 86.60 males.

The median income for a household in the county was $31,758, and the median income for a family was $39,745. Males had a median income of $27,166 versus $20,114 for females. The per capita income for the county was $17,536. About 6.40% of families and 10.80% of the population were below the poverty line, including 12.10% of those under age 18 and 8.70% of those age 65 or over.

== Government ==
=== Presidential elections ===
Cloud County is a Republican stronghold. The last Democrat to carry the county was Jimmy Carter in 1976.

Presidential election results

United States presidential election results for Cloud County, Kansas
Year	Republican		Democratic		Third party(ies)	
Year	No.	%	No.	%	No.	%
1888	2,542	59.55%	1,052	24.64%	675	15.81%
1892	1,915	44.98%	0	0.00%	2,342	55.02%
1896	1,718	44.13%	2,129	54.69%	46	1.18%
1900	2,315	51.87%	2,045	45.82%	103	2.31%
1904	2,470	67.56%	626	17.12%	560	15.32%
1908	2,170	52.24%	1,663	40.03%	321	7.73%
1912	899	21.79%	1,658	40.18%	1,569	38.03%
1916	2,870	39.92%	3,837	53.37%	483	6.72%
1920	4,090	69.82%	1,534	26.19%	234	3.99%
1924	4,342	62.57%	1,238	17.84%	1,359	19.58%
1928	5,286	68.25%	2,376	30.68%	83	1.07%
1932	3,120	39.94%	4,457	57.05%	235	3.01%
1936	4,208	47.90%	4,546	51.75%	31	0.35%
1940	5,275	60.44%	3,327	38.12%	126	1.44%
1944	4,377	63.67%	2,391	34.78%	107	1.56%
1948	4,018	56.16%	2,891	40.41%	246	3.44%
1952	5,580	75.23%	1,793	24.17%	44	0.59%
1956	4,466	68.61%	2,008	30.85%	35	0.54%
1960	4,045	60.58%	2,607	39.04%	25	0.37%
1964	2,680	44.35%	3,314	54.84%	49	0.81%
1968	3,282	56.17%	2,132	36.49%	429	7.34%
1972	3,832	66.38%	1,806	31.28%	135	2.34%
1976	2,954	48.74%	2,976	49.10%	131	2.16%
1980	3,581	61.56%	1,793	30.82%	443	7.62%
1984	3,860	66.43%	1,880	32.35%	71	1.22%
1988	3,043	59.34%	2,022	39.43%	63	1.23%
1992	2,131	39.12%	1,720	31.57%	1,597	29.31%
1996	2,743	54.66%	1,615	32.18%	660	13.15%
2000	2,918	64.80%	1,314	29.18%	271	6.02%
2004	3,221	71.53%	1,210	26.87%	72	1.60%
2008	3,121	70.12%	1,233	27.70%	97	2.18%
2012	2,954	72.79%	974	24.00%	130	3.20%
2016	2,919	74.27%	761	19.36%	250	6.36%
2020	3,242	76.05%	920	21.58%	101	2.37%
2024	3,218	79.52%	767	18.95%	62	1.53%

=== Laws ===
Following amendment to the Kansas Constitution in 1986, Cloud County remained a prohibition, or "dry", county until 1998, when voters approved the sale of alcoholic liquor by the individual drink with a 30 percent food sales requirement.

== Education ==
=== Colleges ===
- Cloud County Community College in Concordia

Historic

- Miltonvale Wesleyan College (closed 1972)
- Concordia Normal School (closed 1876)
- Concordia Business College (closed sometime after 1930)

=== Unified school districts ===
- Clifton-Clyde USD 224
- Concordia USD 333
- Southern Cloud USD 334 (dissolving in 2026)

== Communities ==
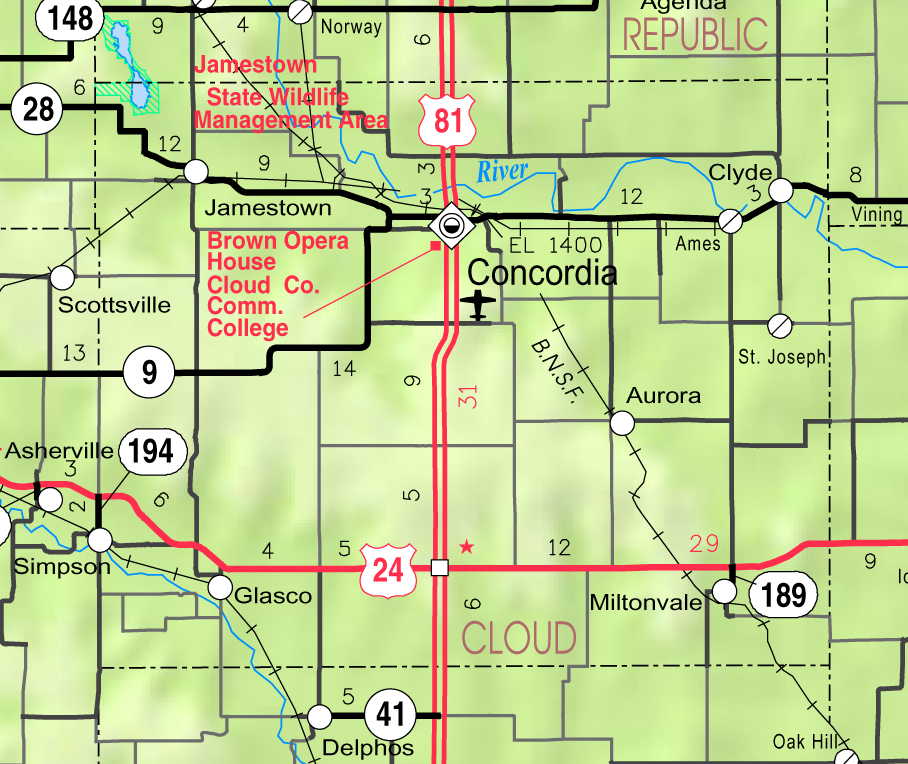
2005 map of Cloud County (map legend)

List of townships / incorporated cities / unincorporated communities / extinct former communities within Cloud County.

=== Cities ===
‡ means a community has portions in an adjacent county or counties.

- Aurora
- Clyde
- Concordia (county seat)
- Glasco
- Jamestown
- Miltonvale
- Simpson‡

=== Unincorporated communities ===
† means a community is designated a Census-Designated Place (CDP) by the United States Census Bureau.

- Ames†
- Hollis
- Huscher
- Rice
- St. Joseph

=== Ghost towns ===
- Macyville
- Sibley
- Yuma

=== Townships ===
Cloud County is divided into eighteen townships. The city of Concordia is considered governmentally independent and is excluded from the census figures for the townships. In the following table, the population center is the largest city (or cities) included in that township's population total, if it is of a significant size.

Township	FIPS	Population center	Population	Population density /km^{2} (/sq mi)	Land area km^{2} (sq mi)	Water area km^{2} (sq mi)	Water %	Geographic coordinates
Arion	02275		105	1 (3)	94 (36)	0 (0)	0.06%	39°28′28″N 97°44′42″W
Aurora	03450		169	2 (5)	94 (36)	0 (0)	0.03%	39°26′27″N 97°32′2″W
Buffalo	09100		119	1 (3)	112 (43)	1 (0)	0.46%	39°35′12″N 97°45′13″W
Center	11625		172	1 (3)	141 (54)	0 (0)	0%	39°26′51″N 97°38′45″W
Colfax	14775		49	1 (1)	93 (36)	0 (0)	0.05%	39°26′6″N 97°25′19″W
Elk	20150		845	12 (30)	72 (28)	1 (0)	1.08%	39°35′51″N 97°24′16″W
Grant	27525		479	5 (14)	92 (35)	2 (1)	1.75%	39°36′6″N 97°52′7″W
Lawrence	38875		146	2 (4)	93 (36)	1 (0)	1.22%	39°36′18″N 97°32′41″W
Lincoln	40525		378	6 (16)	61 (24)	1 (0)	1.21%	39°33′20″N 97°39′5″W
Lyon	43425		103	1 (2)	142 (55)	0 (0)	0.02%	39°22′2″N 97°46′20″W
Meredith	45925		77	1 (2)	94 (36)	0 (0)	0.03%	39°21′1″N 97°38′53″W
Nelson	49600		137	2 (4)	91 (35)	0 (0)	0%	39°30′55″N 97°31′36″W
Oakland	51750		52	1 (1)	93 (36)	0 (0)	0.15%	39°21′44″N 97°31′44″W
Shirley	65375		178	2 (4)	110 (42)	1 (0)	0.60%	39°32′47″N 97°26′5″W
Sibley	65425		178	2 (5)	92 (35)	1 (1)	1.45%	39°36′54″N 97°42′5″W
Solomon	66250		664	5 (12)	141 (54)	0 (0)	0%	39°21′49″N 97°51′34″W
Starr	68050		653	7 (18)	92 (36)	0 (0)	0.21%	39°20′52″N 97°26′42″W
Summit	69050		50	0 (1)	139 (54)	0 (0)	0%	39°30′11″N 97°51′59″W
Sources: "Census 2000 U.S. Gazetteer Files". U.S. Census Bureau, Geography Division. Archived from the original on August 2, 2002.

== Notable people ==
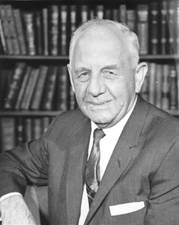
Frank Carlson was the 30th governor of Kansas. He called Concordia his home, and the Frank Carlson Library is named in his honor.

See List of people from Cloud County, Kansas

Charles H. Blosser was an aviator who was awarded the Kansas Governor's Aviation Honors Award and was inducted into the Kansas Aviation Hall of Fame in 1990. At one time, he was the oldest living licensed pilot in the United States.

Napoleon Bonaparte Brown was a soldier, businessman, politician, and resident of Kansas and Missouri in the late 19th and early 20th centuries. He is most known as the namesake and builder of the Brown Grand Theatre in Concordia, Kansas, a majestic opera house completed in 1907 and listed on the National Register of Historic Places. The theater has been called "the most elegant theater between Kansas City and Denver."

Frank Carlson was an American politician who served as the 30th governor of Kansas and United States representative and United States senator from Kansas. He called Concordia his home.

Larry Hartshorn was a former NFL Offensive Guard who played for the Chicago Cardinals in 1955 and 1957. He later played in the Canadian Football League with the Calgary Stampeders in 1958. After his years in professional football, Hartshorn moved to Concordia to become a teacher and coach for 33 years at Concordia Junior-Senior High School, where he coached Keith Christensen. Hartshorn began the wrestling program in 1966, running it as head coach from 1966 to 1974. He continued to serve in various coaching and education capacities until his retirement.

Ernest C. Quigley was a basketball referee and as an umpire in Major League Baseball. He also worked as an American football coach and official. Quigley was raised in Concordia, Kansas where he was a prominent member of the high school football team in the 1890s. In 1944 he became the athletic director at the University of Kansas.

== Popular culture ==
Cloud County has also been listed as one of the locations for Smallville in the Superman story line.

== See also ==
- National Register of Historic Places listings in Cloud County, Kansas
- List of people from Cloud County, Kansas

Community information for Kansas

- Kansas locations by per capita income
- List of counties in Kansas
- List of townships in Kansas
- List of cities in Kansas
- List of unincorporated communities in Kansas
- List of ghost towns in Kansas
