= Sibley, Kansas =

Ghost town in Cloud County, Kansas

- Ghost Town
- Location within Kansas Location within the United States
- Coordinates: 39°36′54″N 97°42′5″W
- Country: United States
- State: Kansas
- County: Cloud
- Founded: 1869
- Named for: Lake Sibley

Population
  - Total: 0
- Time zone: UTC-6 (CST)
  - Summer (DST): UTC-5 (CDT)

Sibley is a ghost town in Cloud County, Kansas, United States. It is located northwest of Concordia, and northeast of the Republican River.

== History ==
Sibley was founded in 1869, and named for Lake Sibley. It was once in the running for the county seat but lost in an 1870 run-off election against Concordia. The area is now abandoned as a town and the land is privately owned and used for farming. It is considered a ghost town.

== Notable people ==
- May Louise Cowles, economist who studied clothing consumption and consumer behavior
