= Plum Creek Township, Kansas =

Township in Mitchell County, Kansas, U.S.

Plum Creek Township
- Township
- Location within Mitchell County
- Coordinates: 39.519746°N 98.094531°W
- Country: United States
- State: Kansas
- County: Mitchell

Area
  - Total: 35.666 sq mi (92.37 km^{2})
  - Land: 35.657 sq mi (92.35 km^{2})
  - Water: 0.009 sq mi (0.023 km^{2}) 0.03%

Population (2020)
  - Total: 108
  - Density: 3.03/sq mi (1.17/km^{2})
- Time zone: UTC-6 (CST)
  - Summer (DST): UTC-5 (CDT)
- Area code: 785

Plum Creek Township is a township in Mitchell County, Kansas, United States. As of the 2020 census, its population was 108.

== Geography ==
Plum Creek Township covers an area of 35.666 square miles (92.37 square kilometers).

=== Adjacent townships ===
- Prairie Township, Jewell County (north)
- Allen Township, Jewell County (northeast)
- Lulu Township, Mitchell County (east)
- Asherville Township, Mitchell County (southeast)
- Beloit Township, Mitchell County (south)
- Turkey Creek Township, Mitchell County (southwest)
- Solomon Rapids Township, Mitchell County (west)

=== Major highways ===
- US-24
- K-9
- K-14
