= Custer Township, Mitchell County, Kansas =

Township in Mitchell County, Kansas, U.S.

Custer Township
- Township
- Location within Mitchell County
- Coordinates: 39.275982°N 98.450304°W
- Country: United States
- State: Kansas
- County: Mitchell

Area
  - Total: 36.287 sq mi (93.98 km^{2})
  - Land: 36.277 sq mi (93.96 km^{2})
  - Water: 0.01 sq mi (0.026 km^{2}) 0.03%

Population (2020)
  - Total: 104
  - Density: 2.87/sq mi (1.11/km^{2})
- Time zone: UTC-6 (CST)
  - Summer (DST): UTC-5 (CDT)
- Area code: 785

Custer Township is a township in Mitchell County, Kansas, United States. As of the 2020 census, its population was 104.

== Geography ==
Custer Township covers an area of 36.287 square miles (93.98 square kilometers).

=== Communities ===
- Hunter

=== Adjacent townships ===
- Pittsburg Township, Mitchell County (north)
- Hayes Township, Mitchell County (northeast)
- Blue Hill Township, Mitchell County (east)
- Orange Township, Lincoln County (southeast)
- Cedron Township, Lincoln County (south)
- Delhi Township, Osborne County (southwest)
- Bloom Township, Osborne County (northwest)

=== Major highways ===
- K-181
