= Starr Township, Kansas =

Starr Township
- Township
- Location in Cloud County
- Coordinates: 39°21′30″N 097°25′31″W
- Country: United States
- State: Kansas
- County: Cloud

Area
  - Total: 35.61 sq mi (92.24 km^{2})
  - Land: 35.54 sq mi (92.05 km^{2})
  - Water: 0.073 sq mi (0.19 km^{2}) 0.21%
- Elevation: 1,424 ft (434 m)

Population (2020)
  - Total: 550
  - Density: 15/sq mi (6.0/km^{2})
- GNIS feature ID: 0476009

Starr Township is a township in Cloud County, Kansas, United States. As of the 2020 census, its population was 550.

== Geography ==
Starr Township covers an area of 35.62 square miles (92.3 km^{2}) and contains one incorporated settlement, Miltonvale. According to the USGS, it contains one cemetery, Miltonvale.
