= Shirley Township, Kansas =

Shirley Township
- Township
- Location in Cloud County
- Coordinates: 39°31′30″N 098°25′21″W
- Country: United States
- State: Kansas
- County: Cloud

Area
  - Total: 42.75 sq mi (110.72 km^{2})
  - Land: 42.49 sq mi (110.06 km^{2})
  - Water: 0.25 sq mi (0.66 km^{2}) 0.6%
- Elevation: 1,540 ft (470 m)

Population (2020)
  - Total: 150
  - Density: 3.5/sq mi (1.4/km^{2})
- GNIS feature ID: 0473353

Shirley Township is a township in Cloud County, Kansas, United States. As of the 2020 census, its population was 150.

== Demographics ==
Shirley is a historically French American community, most of whom are of French Canadian ancestry.

== History ==
Shirley Township was organized in 1866.

== Geography ==
Shirley Township covers an area of 42.75 square miles (110.7 km^{2}) and contains no incorporated settlements. According to the USGS, it contains two cemeteries: Cedar Hill and Pleasant View.

The stream of Beaver Creek runs through this township.
