= Aurora, Kansas =

City in Cloud County, Kansas

- City
- Location within Cloud County and Kansas

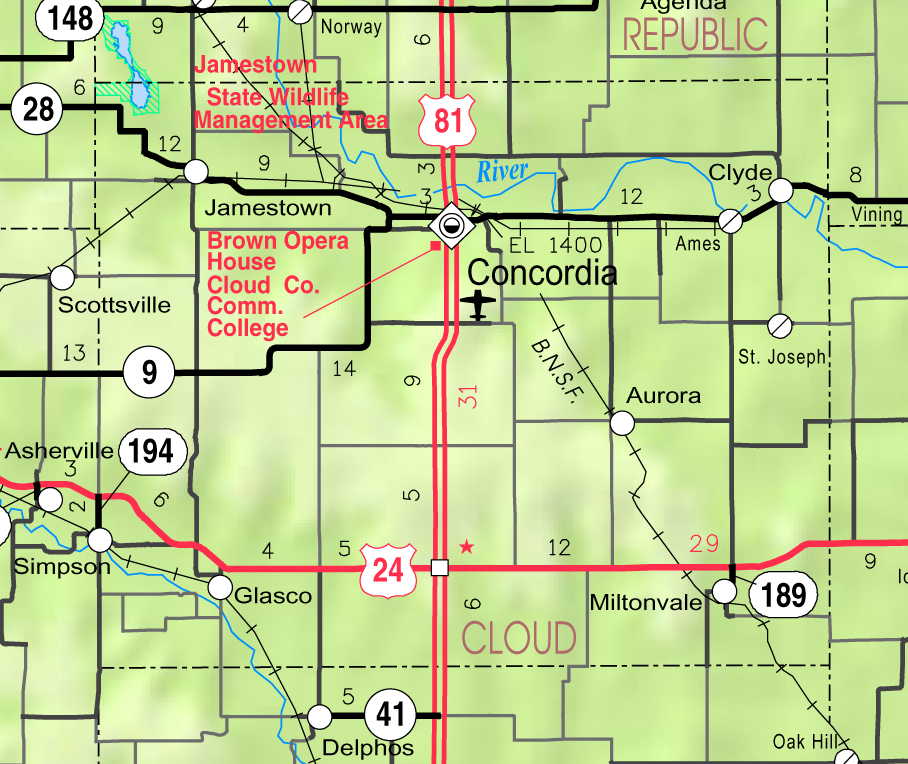
- KDOT map of Cloud County (legend)
- Coordinates: 39°27′07″N 97°31′47″W
- Country: United States
- State: Kansas
- County: Cloud
- Founded: 1880s
- Incorporated: 1910
- Named for: Aurora, Illinois

Area
  - Total: 0.10 sq mi (0.26 km^{2})
  - Land: 0.10 sq mi (0.26 km^{2})
  - Water: 0 sq mi (0.00 km^{2})
- Elevation: 1,499 ft (457 m)

Population (2020)
  - Total: 56
  - Density: 560/sq mi (220/km^{2})
- Time zone: UTC-6 (CST)
  - Summer (DST): UTC-5 (CDT)
- ZIP Code: 67417
- Area code: 785
- FIPS code: 20-03425
- GNIS ID: 2394035

Aurora is a city in Cloud County, Kansas, United States. As of the 2020 census, the population of the city was 56.

== History ==
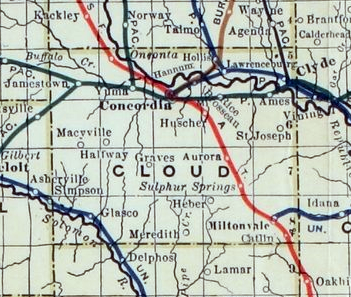
1915 railroad map of Cloud County

In 1887, Atchison, Topeka and Santa Fe Railway built a branch line from Neva (three miles west of Strong City) through Aurora to Superior, Nebraska. In 1996, the Atchison, Topeka and Santa Fe Railway merged with Burlington Northern Railroad and renamed to the current BNSF Railway. Most locals still refer to this railroad as the "Santa Fe".

Aurora was named by settlers who came from Aurora, Illinois.

The first post office was established in Aurora in 1886, but from 1886 until 1888, the post office was called St. Peter.

== Geography ==
According to the United States Census Bureau, the city has a total area of 0.10 square miles (0.26 km^{2}), all land.

== Demographics ==
Historical population
Census	Pop.	Note	%±
1910	269		—
1920	275		2.2%
1930	256		−6.9%
1940	274		7.0%
1950	221		−19.3%
1960	150		−32.1%
1970	120		−20.0%
1980	130		8.3%
1990	101		−22.3%
2000	79		−21.8%
2010	60		−24.1%
2020	56		−6.7%
U.S. Decennial Census

=== 2020 census ===
The 2020 United States census counted 56 people, 13 households, and 7 families in Aurora. The population density was 554.5 per square mile (214.1/km^{2}). There were 27 housing units at an average density of 267.3 per square mile (103.2/km^{2}). The racial makeup was 98.21% (55) white or European American (98.21% non-Hispanic white), 0.0% (0) black or African-American, 0.0% (0) Native American or Alaska Native, 0.0% (0) Asian, 0.0% (0) Pacific Islander or Native Hawaiian, 0.0% (0) from other races, and 1.79% (1) from two or more races. Hispanic or Latino of any race was 0.0% (0) of the population.

Of the 13 households, 30.8% had children under the age of 18; 53.8% were married couples living together; 7.7% had a female householder with no spouse or partner present. 38.5% of households consisted of individuals and 23.1% had someone living alone who was 65 years of age or older. The average household size was 2.0 and the average family size was 3.1. The percent of those with a bachelor's degree or higher was estimated to be 1.8% of the population.

35.7% of the population was under the age of 18, 5.4% from 18 to 24, 26.8% from 25 to 44, 17.9% from 45 to 64, and 14.3% who were 65 years of age or older. The median age was 30.5 years. For every 100 females, there were 69.7 males. For every 100 females ages 18 and older, there were 71.4 males.

The 2016–2020 5-year American Community Survey estimates show that the median household income was $46,406 (with a margin of error of +/- $15,042) and the median family income was $46,250 (+/- $8,929). The median income for those above 16 years old was $40,469 (+/- $5,801). Approximately, 6.3% of families and 5.3% of the population were below the poverty line, including 0.0% of those under the age of 18 and 33.3% of those ages 65 or over.

=== 2010 census ===
As of the census of 2010, there were 60 people, 24 households, and 17 families living in the city. The population density was 600.0 inhabitants per square mile (231.7/km^{2}). There were 36 housing units at an average density of 360.0 per square mile (139.0/km^{2}). The racial makeup of the city was 96.7% White and 3.3% Native American.

There were 24 households, of which 37.5% had children under the age of 18 living with them, 54.2% were married couples living together, 8.3% had a female householder with no husband present, 8.3% had a male householder with no wife present, and 29.2% were non-families. 29.2% of all households were made up of individuals, and 12.5% had someone living alone who was 65 years of age or older. The average household size was 2.50 and the average family size was 2.82.

The median age in the city was 38 years. 33.3% of residents were under the age of 18; 3.5% were between the ages of 18 and 24; 25% were from 25 to 44; 26.7% were from 45 to 64; and 11.7% were 65 years of age or older. The gender makeup of the city was 53.3% male and 46.7% female.

== Education ==
The community is served by Concordia USD 333 public school district. The Concordia High School mascot is Panthers.
