= Pittsburg Township, Kansas =

Civil township in Mitchell County, Kansas

Pittsburg Township
- Township
- Location within Mitchell County
- Coordinates: 39°21′00″N 98°26′01″W
- Country: United States
- State: Kansas
- County: Mitchell
- Established: 1871

Area
  - Total: 36.11 sq mi (93.5 km^{2})
  - Land: 36.107 sq mi (93.52 km^{2})
  - Water: 0.003 sq mi (0.0078 km^{2}) 0.01%

Population (2020)
  - Total: 258
  - Density: 7.15/sq mi (2.76/km^{2})
- Time zone: UTC-6 (CST)
  - Summer (DST): UTC-5 (CDT)
- Area code: 785

Pittsburg Township is a civil township in Mitchell County, Kansas, United States. Its area includes the point at the intersection of Latitude 39.35 and Longitude -98.43333.

== History ==
The township's name is derived from William Augustus Pitt, one of the founders of the central town of the township, Tipton. Through about 1901, the township name was spelled "Pittsburgh," and it surrounded a town that had the same name. From 1902 on, the township name dropped the final H.

The first white settlers came to this Pittsburg in 1871. We know from official records that Mr. W. A. Pitt lived here in 1872, one-half mile east of the present town site, on a farm he owned. Mr. Pitt's house served as the local post office. Hence it was hardly surprising that the scattered settlers in and around this territory began to call it Pitt's-burg.

At the request of the United States Postal Service, the town was renamed to avoid confusion with the larger town of Pittsburg, Kansas in Crawford County. Because some early settlers of the area had also resided for a time in the industrial city of Pittsburgh, Pennsylvania, it is often popularly thought the township name derives from that city, but that is mere speculation.

== Geography ==
Pittsburg Township covers an area of 36.11 square miles (93.5 square kilometers).

=== Communities ===
- Tipton

=== Adjacent townships ===
- Carr Creek Township, Mitchell County (north)
- Walnut Creek Township, Mitchell County (northeast)
- Hayes Township, Mitchell County (east)
- Blue Hill Township, Mitchell County (southeast)
- Custer Township, Mitchell County (south)
- Bloom Township, Osborne County (west)
- Corinth Township, Osborne County (northwest)

=== Major highways ===
- K-181
