= Shirley Township, Ripley County, Missouri =

Township in Ripley County, Missouri, U.S.

Coordinates: 36.6433°N 90.9478°W

Shirley Township is an inactive township in Ripley County, in the U.S. state of Missouri.

A variant spelling was "Sherley Township". The township was erected in 1892, taking its name from Frank M. Sherley, an early settler.
