= Center Township, Hickory County, Missouri =

Township in Hickory County, Missouri, USA

Coordinates: 37.9311°N 93.2906°W

Center Township is an inactive township in Hickory County, in the U.S. state of Missouri.

Center Township was established in 1845, and named for its location near the county's geographical center.
