= Center Township, St. Clair County, Missouri =

Inactive township in the American state of Missouri

Coordinates: 38.0442°N 93.8086°W

Center Township is an inactive township in St. Clair County, in the U.S. state of Missouri.

Center Township was erected in ca. 1890, and named for the fact the geographical center of St. Clair County lies within its borders.
