= Center Township, Chautauqua County, Kansas =

Center Township
- Township
- Location in Chautauqua County
- Coordinates: 37°15′10″N 096°18′01″W
- Country: United States
- State: Kansas
- County: Chautauqua

Area
  - Total: 55.99 sq mi (145.02 km^{2})
  - Land: 55.54 sq mi (143.86 km^{2})
  - Water: 0.45 sq mi (1.17 km^{2}) 0.81%
- Elevation: 1,066 ft (325 m)

Population (2020)
  - Total: 81
  - Density: 1.6/sq mi (0.6/km^{2})
- GNIS feature ID: 0469516

Center Township is a township in Chautauqua County, Kansas, United States. As of the 2020 census, its population was 81.

== Geography ==
Center Township covers an area of 55.99 square miles (145.0 km^{2}) and contains no incorporated settlements. According to the USGS, it contains one cemetery, Belknap.

The stream of Bakers Branch runs through this township.
