= Center Township, Cloud County, Kansas =

Center Township
- Township
- Location in Cloud County
- Coordinates: 39°27′30″N 097°38′31″W
- Country: United States
- State: Kansas
- County: Cloud

Area
  - Total: 54.26 sq mi (140.52 km^{2})
  - Land: 54.26 sq mi (140.52 km^{2})
  - Water: 0 sq mi (0 km^{2}) 0%
- Elevation: 1,624 ft (495 m)

Population (2020 census)
  - Total: 182
  - Density: 3.35/sq mi (1.30/km^{2})
- Time zone: UTC-6 (CST)
  - Summer (DST): UTC-5 (CDT)
- GNIS ID: 473326

Center Township is a township in Cloud County, Kansas, United States. As of the 2020 census, its population was 182.

== History ==
Center Township was organized in 1873 and was named due to its position at the geographical center of Cloud County.

== Geography ==
Center Township covers an area of 54.26 square miles (140.5 km^{2}) and contains no incorporated settlements. According to the USGS, it contains four cemeteries: Enterprise, Hall, Kindel and Pleasant Hill.

The stream of East Branch Oak Creek runs through this township.
