= Center Township, Vernon County, Missouri =

Township in the US state of Missouri

Coordinates: 37.8072°N 94.3461°W

Center Township is a township in Vernon County, in the U.S. state of Missouri.

Center Township was erected in 1855, and named for the fact the geographical center point of Vernon County lies within its borders.
