= Center Township, Dickinson County, Kansas =

Center Township
- Township
- Location in Dickinson County
- Coordinates: 38°54′55″N 097°05′36″W
- Country: United States
- State: Kansas
- County: Dickinson

Area
  - Total: 36.17 sq mi (93.69 km^{2})
  - Land: 35.39 sq mi (91.67 km^{2})
  - Water: 0.78 sq mi (2.02 km^{2}) 2.16%
- Elevation: 1,120 ft (340 m)

Population (2020)
  - Total: 1,059
  - Density: 29.92/sq mi (11.55/km^{2})
- GNIS feature ID: 0476679

Center Township is a township in Dickinson County, Kansas, United States. As of the 2020 census, its population was 1,059.

== Geography ==
Center Township covers an area of 36.17 square miles (93.7 km^{2}) and contains one incorporated settlement, Enterprise. According to the USGS, it contains one cemetery, Mount Hope.

Terrapin Lake is within this township. The stream of Lone Tree Creek runs through this township.

== Transportation ==
Center Township contains two airports or landing strips: Academy Airport and Prichard Airstrip.
