= Center Township, Mitchell County, Kansas =

Township in Mitchell County, Kansas, U.S.

Center Township
- Township
- Location within Mitchell County
- Coordinates: 39.357249°N 98.200712°W
- Country: United States
- State: Kansas
- County: Mitchell

Area
  - Total: 35.873 sq mi (92.91 km^{2})
  - Land: 35.872 sq mi (92.91 km^{2})
  - Water: 0.001 sq mi (0.0026 km^{2}) 0%

Population (2020)
  - Total: 36
  - Density: 1.0/sq mi (0.39/km^{2})
- Time zone: UTC-6 (CST)
  - Summer (DST): UTC-5 (CDT)
- Area code: 785

Center Township is a township in Mitchell County, Kansas, United States. As of the 2020 census, its population was 36.

== Geography ==
Center Township covers an area of 35.873 square miles (92.91 square kilometers).

=== Adjacent townships ===
- Turkey Creek Township, Mitchell County (north)
- Beloit Township, Mitchell County (northeast)
- Bloomfield Township, Mitchell County (east)
- Salt Creek Township, Mitchell County (southeast)
- Round Springs Township, Mitchell County (south)
- Blue Hill Township, Mitchell County (southwest)
- Hayes Township, Mitchell County (west)
- Walnut Creek Township, Mitchell County (northwest)
