= Center Township, Hodgeman County, Kansas =

Center Township Hodgeman County, Kansas
- Township
- Location within Hodgeman County

- Location within Kansas
- Coordinates: 38°05′18″N 099°53′54″W
- Country: United States
- State: Kansas
- County: Hodgeman

Area
  - Total: 144.34 sq mi (373.83 km^{2})
  - Land: 144.27 sq mi (373.65 km^{2})
  - Water: 0.069 sq mi (0.18 km^{2}) 0.05%
- Elevation: 2,320 ft (710 m)

Population (2020)
  - Total: 963
  - Density: 6.68/sq mi (2.58/km^{2})
- Time zone: UTC-6 (CST)
  - Summer (DST): UTC-5 (CDT)
- FIPS code: 20-11725
- GNIS ID: 471562

Center Township is a township in Hodgeman County, Kansas, United States. As of the 2020 census, its population was 963.

== Geography ==
Center Township covers an area of 144.34 square miles (373.8 km^{2}) and contains one incorporated settlement, Jetmore (the county seat). According to the USGS, it contains two cemeteries: Fairmount and Saint Lawrence.

The stream of Spring Creek runs through this township.
