= Center Township, McDonald County, Missouri =

Township in the US state of Missouri

Coordinates: 36.6122°N 94.1642°W

Center Township is a township in McDonald County, in the U.S. state of Missouri.

Center Township was named for its central location on the eastern border of the county.
