= Little Cheyenne Creek =

Stream in South Dakota, U.S.

Coordinates: 45°03′46″N 100°13′43″W

Little Cheyenne Creek is a stream in the U.S. state of South Dakota.

Little Cheyenne Creek was used as a stopping place of the Cheyenne Indians, hence the name.

== See also ==
- List of rivers of South Dakota
