= Grant Township, Cloud County, Kansas =

Grant Township
- Township
- Location in Cloud County
- Coordinates: 39°36′03″N 097°54′01″W
- Country: United States
- State: Kansas
- County: Cloud

Area
  - Total: 36.01 sq mi (93.27 km^{2})
  - Land: 35.38 sq mi (91.64 km^{2})
  - Water: 0.63 sq mi (1.63 km^{2}) 1.75%
- Elevation: 1,460 ft (445 m)

Population (2020)
  - Total: 324
  - Density: 9.16/sq mi (3.54/km^{2})
- GNIS feature ID: 0473072

Grant Township is an agricultural township in Cloud County, Kansas, United States. As of the 2020 census, its population was 324.

== History ==
Grant Township was organized in 1872 and was named after President Ulysses S. Grant.

== Geography ==
Grant Township covers an area of 36.01 square miles (93.3 km^{2}) and contains one incorporated settlement, Jamestown. According to the USGS, it contains two cemeteries: Jamestown and Saint Marys.

The streams of Cheyenne Creek, Little Cheyenne Creek, Marsh Creek and Skunk Creek run through this township.
