= Center Township, Wilson County, Kansas =

Township in Wilson County, Kansas, U.S.

Coordinates: 37.5144°N 95.8056°W

Center Township is a township in Wilson County, Kansas, United States.

== History ==
Center Township was named from its position at the geographical center of Wilson County.
