= Center Township, Pope County, Arkansas =

Center Township
- Township
- Location in Arkansas
- Coordinates: 35°24′20″N 92°57′16″W
- Country: United States
- State: Arkansas
- County: Pope

Area
  - Total: 14.03 sq mi (36.3 km^{2})
  - Land: 14.0 sq mi (36 km^{2})
  - Water: 0.03 sq mi (0.078 km^{2})
- Elevation: 620 ft (190 m)

Population (2000)
  - Total: 523
  - Density: 37.4/sq mi (14.4/km^{2})
- Time zone: UTC-6 (CST)
  - Summer (DST): UTC-5 (CDT)
- GNIS feature ID: 69699

Center Township is one of nineteen current townships in Pope County, Arkansas, USA. As of the 2010 census, its unincorporated population was 523.

== Geography ==
According to the United States Census Bureau, Center Township covers an area of 14.03 square miles (36.3 km^{2}); 14 square miles (36 km^{2}) of land and 0.03 square miles (0.078 km^{2}) of water.
