= Center Township, Atchison County, Kansas =

Center Township
- Township
- Location in Atchison County
- Coordinates: 39°27′55″N 095°17′31″W
- Country: United States
- State: Kansas
- County: Atchison

Area
  - Total: 53.6 sq mi (138.8 km^{2})
  - Land: 53.5 sq mi (138.6 km^{2})
  - Water: 0.077 sq mi (0.2 km^{2}) 0.12%
- Elevation: 1,122 ft (342 m)

Population (2010)
  - Total: 625
  - Density: 12/sq mi (4.5/km^{2})
- GNIS feature ID: 0473488

Center Township is a township in Atchison County, Kansas, United States. As of the 2010 census, its population was 625.

== Geography ==
Center Township covers an area of 53.6 square miles (138.8 km^{2}) and contains no incorporated settlements.

The streams of Little Stranger Creek and Mooney Creek run through this township.
