= Center Township, Ralls County, Missouri =

Inactive township in the American state of Missouri

Coordinates: 39.5186°N 91.5589°W

Center Township is an inactive township in Ralls County, in the U.S. state of Missouri.

Center Township is at the geographical center of Ralls County, hence the name.
