= Center Township, Knox County, Missouri =

Inactive township in the American state of Missouri

Coordinates: 40.1681°N 92.1731°W

Center Township is an inactive township in Knox County, in the U.S. state of Missouri.

Center Township most likely derives its name from "Centerville", an old variant name of Colony, Missouri.
