= Center Township, Decatur County, Kansas =

Center Township
- Township
- Location in Decatur County
- Coordinates: 39°46′54″N 100°27′32″W
- Country: United States
- State: Kansas
- County: Decatur

Area
  - Total: 35.77 sq mi (92.65 km^{2})
  - Land: 35.76 sq mi (92.62 km^{2})
  - Water: 0.012 sq mi (0.03 km^{2}) 0.03%
- Elevation: 2,717 ft (828 m)

Population (2020)
  - Total: 52
  - Density: 1.5/sq mi (0.56/km^{2})
- GNIS feature ID: 0471009

Center Township is a township in Decatur County, Kansas, United States. As of the 2020 census, its population was 52.

== Geography ==
Center Township covers an area of 35.77 square miles (92.6 km^{2}) and contains no incorporated settlements.
