= Center Township, Dade County, Missouri =

Township in the American state of Missouri

Coordinates: 37.4305849°N 93.8402581°W

Center Township is a township in Dade County, in the U.S. state of Missouri.

Center Township is located near the Dade County's geographical center, hence the name.
