= Summit Township, Cloud County, Kansas =

Summit Township
- Township
- Location in Cloud County
- Coordinates: 39°30′15″N 097°52′21″W
- Country: United States
- State: Kansas
- County: Cloud

Area
  - Total: 53.72 sq mi (139.13 km^{2})
  - Land: 53.72 sq mi (139.13 km^{2})
  - Water: 0 sq mi (0 km^{2}) 0%
- Elevation: 1,558 ft (475 m)

Population (2020)
  - Total: 51
  - Density: 0.95/sq mi (0.37/km^{2})
- GNIS feature ID: 0473295

Summit Township is a township in Cloud County, Kansas, United States. As of the 2020 census, its population was 51.

== Geography ==
Summit Township covers an area of 53.72 square miles (139.1 km^{2}) and contains no incorporated settlements. According to the USGS, it contains one cemetery, West Summit.
