= Delphos, Kansas =

City in Ottawa County, Kansas

- City
- Location within Ottawa County and Kansas

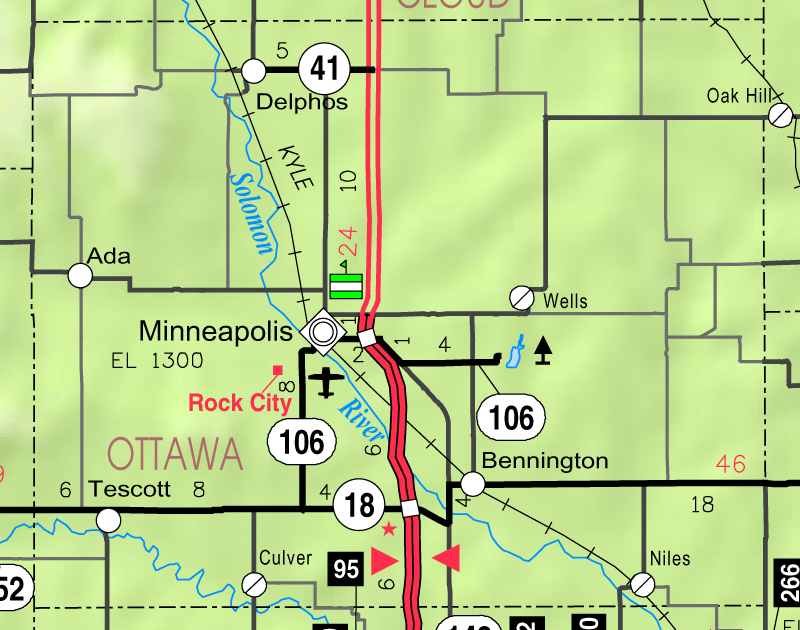
- KDOT map of Ottawa County (legend)
- Coordinates: 39°16′28″N 97°45′55″W
- Country: United States
- State: Kansas
- County: Ottawa
- Founded: 1867
- Incorporated: 1884
- Named for: Delphos, Ohio

Area
  - Total: 0.62 sq mi (1.60 km^{2})
  - Land: 0.59 sq mi (1.53 km^{2})
  - Water: 0.027 sq mi (0.07 km^{2})
- Elevation: 1,309 ft (399 m)

Population (2020)
  - Total: 302
  - Density: 511/sq mi (197/km^{2})
- Time zone: UTC-6 (CST)
  - Summer (DST): UTC-5 (CDT)
- ZIP Code: 67436
- Area code: 785
- FIPS code: 20-17600
- GNIS ID: 2394510

Delphos is a city in Ottawa County, Kansas, United States. As of the 2020 census, the population of the city was 302. The community was named after Delphos, Ohio.

== History ==
Delphos was founded in 1867 by Levi and Dan Yockey. The two brothers moved to the area from Delphos, Ohio and named the new community for their hometown. Many settlers came to the area looking for a fresh start after the Civil War.

== Geography ==
According to the United States Census Bureau, the city has a total area of 0.64 square miles (1.66 km^{2}), of which 0.62 square miles (1.61 km^{2}) is land and 0.02 square miles (0.05 km^{2}) is water.

The city is located on the Solomon River and is five miles west of U.S. Route 81.

== Demographics ==
Historical population
Census	Pop.	Note	%±
1880	256		—
1890	561		119.1%
1900	648		15.5%
1910	767		18.4%
1920	870		13.4%
1930	678		−22.1%
1940	714		5.3%
1950	676		−5.3%
1960	619		−8.4%
1970	599		−3.2%
1980	570		−4.8%
1990	494		−13.3%
2000	469		−5.1%
2010	359		−23.5%
2020	302		−15.9%
U.S. Decennial Census

Delphos is part of the Salina Micropolitan Statistical Area.

=== 2020 census ===
The 2020 United States census counted 302 people, 131 households, and 86 families in Delphos. The population density was 509.3 per square mile (196.6/km^{2}). There were 182 housing units at an average density of 306.9 per square mile (118.5/km^{2}). The racial makeup was 95.03% (287) white or European American (94.04% non-Hispanic white), 0.33% (1) black or African-American, 0.66% (2) Native American or Alaska Native, 0.0% (0) Asian, 0.0% (0) Pacific Islander or Native Hawaiian, 0.33% (1) from other races, and 3.64% (11) from two or more races. Hispanic or Latino of any race was 1.32% (4) of the population.

Of the 131 households, 21.4% had children under the age of 18; 51.9% were married couples living together; 26.7% had a female householder with no spouse or partner present. 32.1% of households consisted of individuals and 19.1% had someone living alone who was 65 years of age or older. The average household size was 2.2 and the average family size was 3.1. The percent of those with a bachelor's degree or higher was estimated to be 9.6% of the population.

22.8% of the population was under the age of 18, 5.3% from 18 to 24, 17.9% from 25 to 44, 31.1% from 45 to 64, and 22.8% who were 65 years of age or older. The median age was 49.2 years. For every 100 females, there were 102.7 males. For every 100 females ages 18 and older, there were 100.9 males.

The 2016–2020 5-year American Community Survey estimates show that the median household income was $46,118 (with a margin of error of +/- $8,989) and the median family income was $61,667 (+/- $13,961). Males had a median income of $31,146 (+/- $13,570) versus $29,063 (+/- $9,495) for females. The median income for those above 16 years old was $30,526 (+/- $5,767). Approximately, 9.4% of families and 15.9% of the population were below the poverty line, including 20.3% of those under the age of 18 and 20.6% of those ages 65 or over.

=== 2010 census ===
As of the census of 2010, there were 359 people, 161 households, and 104 families residing in the city. The population density was 579.0 inhabitants per square mile (223.6/km^{2}). There were 222 housing units at an average density of 358.1 per square mile (138.3/km^{2}). The racial makeup of the city was 96.4% White, 0.8% African American, 0.3% Native American, 0.8% from other races, and 1.7% from two or more races. Hispanic or Latino of any race were 2.2% of the population.

There were 161 households, of which 22.4% had children under the age of 18 living with them, 55.9% were married couples living together, 6.8% had a female householder with no husband present, 1.9% had a male householder with no wife present, and 35.4% were non-families. 32.3% of all households were made up of individuals, and 14.3% had someone living alone who was 65 years of age or older. The average household size was 2.23 and the average family size was 2.72.

The median age in the city was 48.7 years. 21.2% of residents were under the age of 18; 6.6% were between the ages of 18 and 24; 19% were from 25 to 44; 27.5% were from 45 to 64; and 25.6% were 65 years of age or older. The gender makeup of the city was 46.8% male and 53.2% female.

== Education ==
The community is served by North Ottawa County USD 239 public school district.

Delphos schools were closed through school unification. The Delphos High School mascot was Delphos Maroons.

== Notable people ==
- Grace Bedell, credited with influencing Abraham Lincoln to grow his beard.
- L. E. Katterfield, graduated in Delphos 1898, became noted socialist and communist leader.
- Archie McKain, Major League baseball pitcher
