= Lyon Township, Cloud County, Kansas =

Lyon Township
- Township
- Location in Cloud County
- Coordinates: 39°22′20″N 097°45′31″W
- Country: United States
- State: Kansas
- County: Cloud

Area
  - Total: 54.73 sq mi (141.76 km^{2})
  - Land: 54.72 sq mi (141.73 km^{2})
  - Water: 0.0077 sq mi (0.02 km^{2}) 0.01%
- Elevation: 1,401 ft (427 m)

Population (2020)
  - Total: 84
  - Density: 1.5/sq mi (0.59/km^{2})
- GNIS feature ID: 0475982

Lyon Township is a township in Cloud County, Kansas, United States. As of the 2020 census, its population was 84.

== History ==
Lyon Township was originally called Fowler Township (in honor of a pioneer settler), and under the latter name was organized in April, 1872. About a month later it was renamed for General Nathaniel Lyon.

== Geography ==
Lyon Township covers an area of 54.73 square miles (141.8 km^{2}) and contains no incorporated settlements.
