= Meredith Township, Kansas =

Meredith Township
- Township
- Location in Cloud County
- Coordinates: 39°22′20″N 097°38′46″W
- Country: United States
- State: Kansas
- County: Cloud

Area
  - Total: 36.20 sq mi (93.76 km^{2})
  - Land: 36.19 sq mi (93.73 km^{2})
  - Water: 0.012 sq mi (0.03 km^{2}) 0.03%
- Elevation: 1,490 ft (450 m)

Population (2020)
  - Total: 73
  - Density: 2.0/sq mi (0.78/km^{2})
- GNIS ID: 475991

Meredith Township is a township in Cloud County, Kansas, United States. As of the 2020 census, its population was 73.

== History ==
Meredith Township was created in 1872.

== Geography ==
Meredith Township covers an area of 36.2 square miles (94 km^{2}) and contains no incorporated settlements.
