= Solomon Township, Cloud County, Kansas =

Solomon Township
- Township
- Location in Cloud County
- Coordinates: 39°22′20″N 097°52′21″W
- Country: United States
- State: Kansas
- County: Cloud

Area
  - Total: 54.4 sq mi (140.8 km^{2})
  - Land: 54.4 sq mi (140.8 km^{2})
  - Water: 0 sq mi (0 km^{2}) 0%
- Elevation: 1,329 ft (405 m)

Population (2020)
  - Total: 547
  - Density: 10.1/sq mi (3.88/km^{2})
- GNIS feature ID: 0475979

Solomon Township is a township in Cloud County, Kansas, United States. As of the 2020 census, its population was 547.

== Geography ==
Solomon Township covers an area of 54.36 square miles (140.8 km^{2}) and contains one incorporated settlement, Glasco.

The streams of Cris Creek, First Creek, Fisher Creek, Lost Creek, Second Creek and Third Creek run through this township.
