= Lovewell =

Lovewell may refer to:

People:

- Howard Lovewell Cheney (1889–1969), American architect and engineer
- John Lovewell (1691–1725), militia captain, fought during Father Rale's War (also known as Lovewell's War)
- Thomas Lovewell, early settler of Republic and Jewell counties in the Kansas Territory

Places:

- Lovewell, Kansas, unincorporated community in Jewell County, Kansas, US
- Lovewell Mountain, associated with the Sunapee Ridge in southwest New Hampshire, US
- Lovewell State Park, in Jewell County, Kansas, US
- Lovewell Pond, in southeastern Fryeburg, Maine, US
- Lovewell Reservoir, in Jewell County, Kansas, US

Organizations:

- Lovewell Institute for the Creative Arts, also known as Lovewell or Lovewell Institute, in Kansas, US

== See also ==
- The Generous Mr. Lovewell, the sixth studio album by Christian rock band MercyMe
- Livewell
- Lovell (disambiguation)
- Lowell (disambiguation)
