= Washington Township, Jewell County, Kansas =

Washington Township
- Township
- Location in Jewell County
- Coordinates: 39°46′50″N 98°05′21″W
- Country: United States
- State: Kansas
- County: Jewell

Area
  - Total: 35.8 sq mi (92.6 km^{2})
  - Land: 35.8 sq mi (92.6 km^{2})
  - Water: 0 sq mi (0 km^{2}) 0%
- Elevation: 1,631 ft (497 m)

Population (2020)
  - Total: 52
  - Density: 1.5/sq mi (0.56/km^{2})
- GNIS feature ID: 0471991

Washington Township is a township in Jewell County, Kansas, United States. As of the 2020 census, its population was 52.

== Geography ==
Washington Township covers an area of 35.75 square miles (92.6 square kilometers).

=== Unincorporated town ===
- Montrose

(This list is based on USGS data and may include former settlements.)

=== Adjacent townships ===
- Richland Township (north)
- Sinclair Township (northeast)
- Grant Township (east)
- Vicksburg Township (southeast)
- Buffalo Township (south)
- Calvin Township (southwest)
- Center Township (west)
- Holmwood Township (northwest)

=== Cemeteries ===
The township contains three cemeteries: Delta, East Buffalo and Pleasant View.

=== Major highways ===
- U.S. Route 36
- K-14
