= Grant Township, Jewell County, Kansas =

Grant Township
- Township
- Location in Jewell County
- Coordinates: 39°46′52″N 97°58′19″W
- Country: United States
- State: Kansas
- County: Jewell

Area
  - Total: 35.72 sq mi (92.51 km^{2})
  - Land: 35.72 sq mi (92.51 km^{2})
  - Water: 0 sq mi (0 km^{2}) 0%
- Elevation: 1,463 ft (446 m)

Population (2020)
  - Total: 159
  - Density: 4.45/sq mi (1.72/km^{2})
- GNIS feature ID: 0472007

Grant Township is a township in Jewell County, Kansas, United States. As of the 2020 census, its population was 159.

== Geography ==
Grant Township covers an area of 35.72 square miles (92.51 square kilometers).

=== Communities ===
- Formoso

=== Adjacent townships ===
- Sinclair Township (north)
- White Rock Township, Republic County (northeast)
- Courtland Township, Republic County (east)
- Beaver Township, Republic County (southeast)
- Vicksburg Township (south)
- Buffalo Township (southwest)
- Washington Township (west)
- Richland Township (northwest)

=== Cemeteries ===
The township contains one cemetery, Balch.

=== Major highways ===
- U.S. Route 36
