= Burr Oak Township, Jewell County, Kansas =

- Township
- Location in Jewell County
- Coordinates: 39°51′30″N 98°19′41″W
- Country: United States
- State: Kansas
- County: Jewell

Area
  - Total: 39.41 sq mi (102.06 km^{2})
  - Land: 39.41 sq mi (102.06 km^{2})
  - Water: 0 sq mi (0 km^{2}) 0%
- Elevation: 1,673 ft (510 m)

Population (2020)
  - Total: 197
  - Density: 5.00/sq mi (1.93/km^{2})
- GNIS feature ID: 0471851

Burr Oak Township is a township in Jewell County, Kansas, United States. At the 2020 census, its population was 197.

== Geography ==
Burr Oak Township covers an area of 39.41 square miles (102.06 square kilometers). The streams of Burr Oak Creek, Crooked Auger Creek, Walnut Creek and Wolf Creek run through the township.

=== Communities ===
- Burr Oak

=== Adjacent townships ===
- Walnut Township (north)
- Harrison Township (northeast)
- Holmwood Township (east)
- Center Township (southeast)
- Limestone Township (south)
- Esbon Township (southwest)
- White Mound Township (west)
- Highland Township (northwest)

=== Cemeteries ===
The township contains two cemeteries: Baker and Burr Oak.

=== Major highways ===
- K-28
