= Limestone Township, Kansas =

Limestone Township
- Township
- Location in Jewell County
- Coordinates: 39°46′55″N 98°19′51″W
- Country: United States
- State: Kansas
- County: Jewell

Area
  - Total: 39.44 sq mi (102.14 km^{2})
  - Land: 39.43 sq mi (102.13 km^{2})
  - Water: 0.0077 sq mi (0.02 km^{2}) 0.02%
- Elevation: 1,709 ft (521 m)

Population (2020)
  - Total: 37
  - Density: 0.94/sq mi (0.36/km^{2})
- GNIS feature ID: 0471975

Limestone Township is a township in Jewell County, Kansas, United States. As of the 2020 census, its population was 37.

== Geography ==
Limestone Township covers an area of 39.44 square miles (102.14 square kilometers); of this, 0.01 square miles (0.02 square kilometers) or 0.02 percent is water.

=== Communities ===
- Otego

(This list is based on USGS data and may include former settlements.)

=== Adjacent townships ===
- Burr Oak Township (north)
- Holmwood Township (northeast)
- Center Township (east)
- Calvin Township (southeast)
- Ionia Township (south)
- Odessa Township (southwest)
- Esbon Township (west)
- White Mound Township (northwest)

=== Cemeteries ===
The township contains two cemeteries: Lutheran and Zion.

=== Major highways ===
- U.S. Route 36
- K-28
- K-128
