= Center Township, Jewell County, Kansas =

Center Township
- Township
- Location in Jewell County
- Coordinates: 39°47′24″N 98°12′31″W
- Country: United States
- State: Kansas
- County: Jewell

Area
  - Total: 35.8 sq mi (92.8 km^{2})
  - Land: 35.81 sq mi (92.74 km^{2})
  - Water: 0.023 sq mi (0.06 km^{2}) 0.06%
- Elevation: 1,768 ft (539 m)

Population (2020)
  - Total: 956
  - Density: 26.7/sq mi (10.3/km^{2})
- GNIS feature ID: 0471985

Center Township is a township in Jewell County, Kansas, United States. As of the 2020 census, its population was 956.

== History ==
Center Township was organized in 1872. It was named for its location in the geographical center of Jewell County.

== Geography ==
Center Township covers an area of 35.83 square miles (92.8 square kilometers); of this, 0.02 square miles (0.06 square kilometers) or 0.06 percent is water.

=== Communities ===
- Mankato (the county seat)

=== Adjacent townships ===
- Holmwood Township (north)
- Richland Township (northeast)
- Washington Township (east)
- Buffalo Township (southeast)
- Calvin Township (south)
- Ionia Township (southwest)
- Limestone Township (west)
- Burr Oak Township (northwest)

=== Cemeteries ===
The township contains three cemeteries: Lutheran, Mount Hope and Saint Teresa.

=== Major highways ===
- U.S. Route 36
- K-14
- K-28

=== Airports and landing strips ===
- Mankato Airport
