= Jackson Township, Jewell County, Kansas =

Jackson Township
- Township
- Location in Jewell County
- Coordinates: 39°57′35″N 97°58′16″W
- Country: United States
- State: Kansas
- County: Jewell

Area
  - Total: 35.74 sq mi (92.57 km^{2})
  - Land: 35.42 sq mi (91.73 km^{2})
  - Water: 0.32 sq mi (0.84 km^{2}) 0.91%
- Elevation: 1,624 ft (495 m)

Population (2020)
  - Total: 110
  - Density: 3.1/sq mi (1.2/km^{2})
- GNIS feature ID: 0471896

Jackson Township is a township in Jewell County, Kansas, United States. As of the 2020 census, its population was 110.

== Geography ==
Jackson Township covers an area of 35.74 square miles (92.57 square kilometers); of this, 0.32 square miles (0.84 square kilometers) or 0.91 percent is water. The stream of Crosby Creek runs through this township.

=== Communities ===
- Webber

=== Adjacent townships ===
- Big Bend Township, Republic County (east)
- White Rock Township, Republic County (southeast)
- Sinclair Township (south)
- Richland Township (southwest)
- Montana Township (west)

=== Cemeteries ===
The township contains one cemetery, Spring Grove Elementary School.
