= Esbon Township, Kansas =

Esbon Township
- Township
- Location in Jewell County
- Coordinates: 39°46′55″N 98°27′31″W
- Country: United States
- State: Kansas
- County: Jewell

Area
  - Total: 35.84 sq mi (92.83 km^{2})
  - Land: 35.81 sq mi (92.75 km^{2})
  - Water: 0.031 sq mi (0.08 km^{2}) 0.09%
- Elevation: 1,778 ft (542 m)

Population (2020)
  - Total: 141
  - Density: 3.94/sq mi (1.52/km^{2})
- GNIS feature ID: 0485523

Esbon Township is a township in Jewell County, Kansas, United States. As of the 2020 census, its population was 141.

== Geography ==
Esbon Township covers an area of 35.84 square miles (92.83 square kilometers); of this, 0.03 square miles (0.08 square kilometers) or 0.09 percent is water.

=== Communities ===
- Esbon

=== Adjacent townships ===
- White Mound Township (north)
- Burr Oak Township (northeast)
- Limestone Township (east)
- Ionia Township (southeast)
- Odessa Township (south)
- Webster Township, Smith County (southwest)
- Oak Township, Smith County (west)
- White Rock Township, Smith County (northwest)

=== Cemeteries ===
The township contains three cemeteries: Esbon, Prairie Home and Saint Elizabeth.

=== Major highways ===
- U.S. Route 36
