= Calvin Township =

Calvin Township may refer to:

- Calvin Township, Jewell County, Kansas
- Calvin Township, Michigan
- Calvin, Ontario, Canada, a township
