= Walnut Township, Jewell County, Kansas =

Walnut Township
- Township
- Location in Jewell County
- Coordinates: 39°57′28″N 98°19′51″W
- Country: United States
- State: Kansas
- County: Jewell

Area
  - Total: 39.46 sq mi (102.21 km^{2})
  - Land: 39.44 sq mi (102.14 km^{2})
  - Water: 0.027 sq mi (0.07 km^{2}) 0.07%
- Elevation: 1,818 ft (554 m)

Population (2020)
  - Total: 56
  - Density: 1.4/sq mi (0.55/km^{2})
- GNIS feature ID: 0471850

Walnut Township is a township in Jewell County, Kansas, United States. As of the 2020 census, its population was 56.

== Geography ==
Walnut Township covers an area of 39.46 square miles (102.21 square kilometers); of this, 0.03 square miles (0.07 square kilometers) or 0.07 percent is water.

=== Unincorporated communities ===
- North Branch

=== Adjacent townships ===
- Harrison Township (east)
- Holmwood Township (southeast)
- Burr Oak Township (south)
- White Mound Township (southwest)
- Highland Township (west)

=== Major highways ===
- K-128
