= Ionia Township, Kansas =

Ionia Township
- Township
- Location in Jewell County
- Coordinates: 39°41′58″N 98°19′56″W
- Country: United States
- State: Kansas
- County: Jewell

Area
  - Total: 39.52 sq mi (102.35 km^{2})
  - Land: 39.48 sq mi (102.24 km^{2})
  - Water: 0.042 sq mi (0.11 km^{2}) 0.11%
- Elevation: 1,581 ft (482 m)

Population (2020)
  - Total: 67
  - Density: 1.7/sq mi (0.66/km^{2})
- GNIS feature ID: 0472090

Ionia Township is a township in Jewell County, Kansas, United States. As of the 2020 census, its population was 67.

== Geography ==
Ionia Township covers an area of 39.52 square miles (102.35 square kilometers); of this, 0.04 square miles (0.11 square kilometers), or 0.11 percent, is water. The streams of Elm Creek and Gimlet Creek run through the township.

=== Communities ===
- Ionia

(This list is based on USGS data and may include former settlements.)

=== Adjacent townships ===
- Limestone Township (north)
- Center Township (northeast)
- Calvin Township (east)
- Browns Creek Township (southeast)
- Athens Township (south)
- Erving Township (southwest)
- Odessa Township (west)
- Esbon Township (northwest)

=== Cemeteries ===
The township contains one cemetery, Ionia.

=== Major highways ===
- K-128
