= Montana Township, Jewell County, Kansas =

Montana Township
- Township
- Location in Jewell County
- Coordinates: 39°57′35″N 98°05′16″W
- Country: United States
- State: Kansas
- County: Jewell

Area
  - Total: 36.43 sq mi (94.35 km^{2})
  - Land: 36.38 sq mi (94.22 km^{2})
  - Water: 0.050 sq mi (0.13 km^{2}) 0.14%
- Elevation: 1,719 ft (524 m)

Population (2020)
  - Total: 64
  - Density: 1.8/sq mi (0.68/km^{2})
- GNIS feature ID: 0471873

Montana Township is a township in Jewell County, Kansas, United States. As of the 2020 census, its population was 64.

== Geography ==
Montana Township covers an area of 36.43 square miles (94.35 square kilometers); of this, 0.05 square miles (0.13 square kilometers) or 0.14 percent is water.

=== Adjacent townships ===
- Jackson Township (east)
- Sinclair Township (southeast)
- Richland Township (south)
- Holmwood Township (southwest)
- Harrison Township (west)

=== Cemeteries ===
The township contains one cemetery, Montana.

=== Major highways ===
- K-14
