= Thomas Lovewell =

Thomas Lovewell was an early settler of Republic and Jewell counties in the Kansas Territory. Lovewell Reservoir was named in his honor. In 1866, Lovewell settled the town of White Rock and also founded the town of Lovewell. He was an abolitionist in Marshall County, Kansas before journeying on to Pike's Peak.
