= Dentonia, Kansas =

Ghost town in Jewell County, Kansas

- Former town
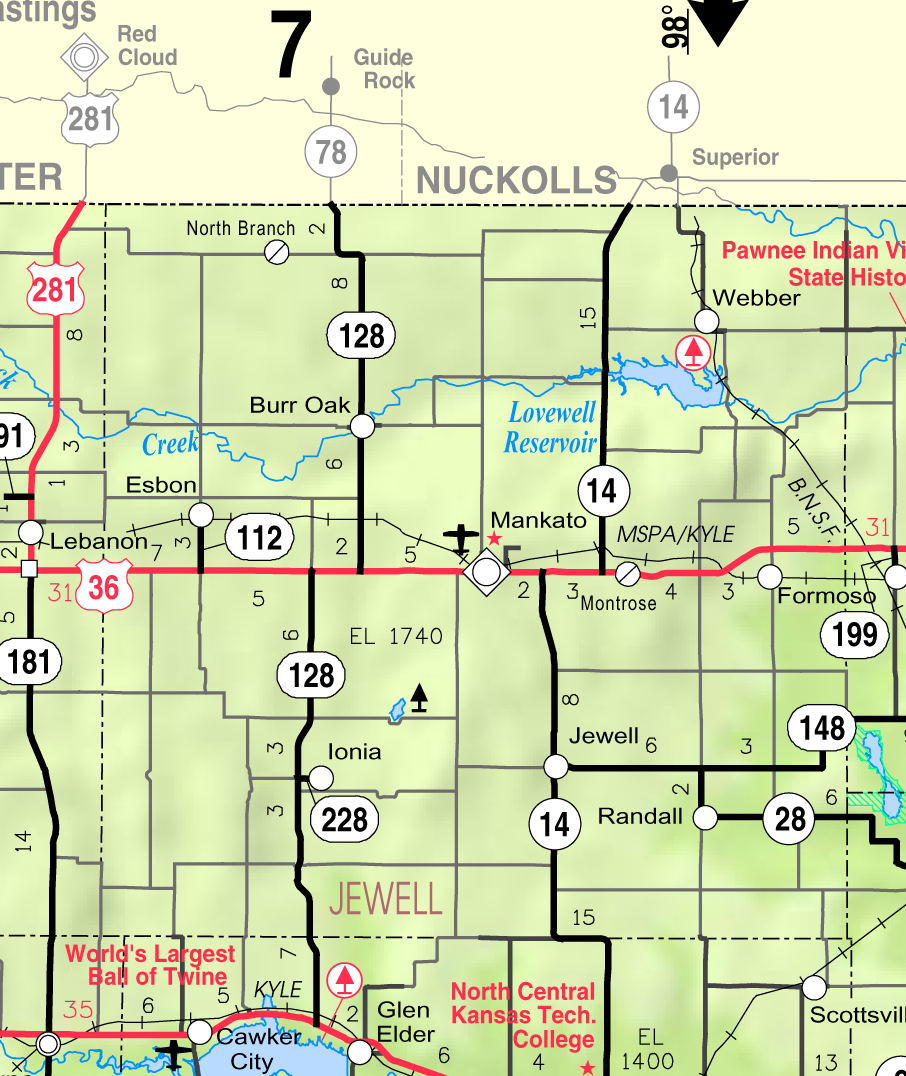
- KDOT map of Jewell County (legend)

- Location within Kansas Location within the United States
- Coordinates: 39°41′02″N 98°28′03″W
- Country: United States
- State: Kansas
- County: Jewell
- Elevation: 1,736 ft (529 m)

Population
  - Total: 0
- Time zone: UTC-6 (CST)
  - Summer (DST): UTC-5 (CDT)
- Area code: 785
- FIPS code: 20-17760
- GNIS ID: 484589

Dentonia is a former town in Jewell County, Kansas, United States.

== History ==
First settled in 1882 with the establishment of a post office, the population of this small farming village peaked in 1910 at 60 residents, at which point it boasted a blacksmith's shop, doctor's office, dance hall, store, church and school. The post office was discontinued in 1903.

Dentonia's population was 34 in 1920, and was just 3 in 1940.

The Dentonia School District was numbered 109. Dentonia's store was the location of the Independent Order of Odd Fellows and Rebekah Lodge. The store closed and was torn down circa 1959.

The town lost its last residents at some point after the closure of the school in 1964, but the church continued to hold services until 1998 and was destroyed by a fire in 2002.
