= Richland Township, Jewell County, Kansas =

Richland Township
- Township
- Location in Jewell County
- Coordinates: 39°51′21″N 98°05′21″W
- Country: United States
- State: Kansas
- County: Jewell

Area
  - Total: 35.81 sq mi (92.75 km^{2})
  - Land: 32.18 sq mi (83.35 km^{2})
  - Water: 3.6 sq mi (9.4 km^{2}) 10.13%
- Elevation: 1,768 ft (539 m)

Population (2020)
  - Total: 32
  - Density: 0.99/sq mi (0.38/km^{2})
- GNIS ID: 471874

Richland Township is a township in Jewell County, Kansas, United States. As of the 2020 census, its population was 32.

== Geography ==
Richland Township covers an area of 35.81 square miles (92.75 square kilometers); of this, 3.63 square miles (9.4 square kilometers) or 10.13 percent is water. The streams of Johns Creek, Montana Creek and Taylor Creek run through this township.

=== Adjacent townships ===
- Montana Township (north)
- Jackson Township (northeast)
- Sinclair Township (east)
- Grant Township (southeast)
- Washington Township (south)
- Center Township (southwest)
- Holmwood Township (west)
- Harrison Township (northwest)

=== Cemeteries ===
The township contains one cemetery, Dahl.

=== Major highways ===
- K-14
