= Highland Township, Jewell County, Kansas =

Highland Township
- Township
- Location in Jewell County
- Coordinates: 39°57′35″N 98°27′11″W
- Country: United States
- State: Kansas
- County: Jewell

Area
  - Total: 35.91 sq mi (93.01 km^{2})
  - Land: 35.90 sq mi (92.98 km^{2})
  - Water: 0.0077 sq mi (0.02 km^{2}) 0.02%
- Elevation: 1,900 ft (580 m)

Population (2020)
  - Total: 35
  - Density: 0.97/sq mi (0.38/km^{2})
- GNIS feature ID: 0471848

Highland Township is a township in Jewell County, Kansas, United States. As of the 2020 census, its population was 35.

== Geography ==
Highland Township covers an area of 35.91 square miles (93.01 square kilometers); of this, 0.01 square miles (0.02 square kilometers) or 0.02 percent is water.

=== Adjacent townships ===
- Walnut Township (east)
- Burr Oak Township (southeast)
- White Mound Township (south)
- White Rock Township, Smith County (southwest)
- Logan Township, Smith County (west)

=== Cemeteries ===
The township contains one cemetery, Highland.
