= White Rock, Kansas =

Ghost town in Kansas, United States

Coordinates: 39°53′10″N 97°55′56″W

White Rock is a ghost town in Republic County, Kansas, United States. It is located 6 miles (9.7 km) north of Courtland.

== History ==
Several attempts were made to settle the area, but it was only in 1866 that Thomas Lovewell settled the town permanently. White Rock was formally laid out in 1871 and school began to be taught that same year. It was considered a desirable location because of its land qualities.

The town was located on the west side of the Republican River in the White Rock township, approximately 14 miles northwest of Belleville. It was the first settlement in the county west of the Republican River. In 1873 there were three general stores, a sawmill, a corn mill and a hotel.

In 1878, Republic County voters had the chance to approve $130,000 worth of bonds for the Kansas Pacific railway company to build a railroad line that would have extended from Clifton to the then-thriving towns of Seapo, Belleville and White Rock. County voters defeated the bond issue 1,126 to 850. In White Rock township, only two people voted in favor and 95 against. The last residents of White Rock related that city leaders believed their town was so prosperous that the railroad would build through their town whether or not they approved the bonds to help fund the connection.

As of 1912, there were no businesses and only about 30 people who resided in the location.
