= Sinclair Township, Kansas =

Sinclair Township
- Township
- Location in Jewell County
- Coordinates: 39°51′19″N 97°58′06″W
- Country: United States
- State: Kansas
- County: Jewell

Area
  - Total: 35.34 sq mi (91.52 km^{2})
  - Land: 34.34 sq mi (88.95 km^{2})
  - Water: 0.99 sq mi (2.57 km^{2}) 2.81%
- Elevation: 1,562 ft (476 m)

Population (2020)
  - Total: 59
  - Density: 1.7/sq mi (0.66/km^{2})
- GNIS ID: 471897

Sinclair Township is a township in Jewell County, Kansas, United States. As of the 2020 census, its population was 59.

== Geography ==
Sinclair Township covers an area of 35.34 square miles (91.52 square kilometers); of this, 0.99 square miles (2.57 square kilometers) or 2.81 percent is water.

=== Unincorporated communities ===
- Lovewell

(This list is based on USGS data and may include former settlements.)

=== Adjacent townships ===
- Jackson Township (north)
- Big Bend Township, Republic County (northeast)
- White Rock Township, Republic County (east)
- Courtland Township, Republic County (southeast)
- Grant Township (south)
- Washington Township (southwest)
- Richland Township (west)
- Montana Township (northwest)

=== Cemeteries ===
The township contains three cemeteries: Fairview, Laurel Hill and Switzers Gap.
