= Buffalo Township, Jewell County, Kansas =

Buffalo Township
- Township
- Location in Jewell County
- Coordinates: 39°41′55″N 98°05′29″W
- Country: United States
- State: Kansas
- County: Jewell

Area
  - Total: 40.61 sq mi (105.18 km^{2})
  - Land: 40.58 sq mi (105.11 km^{2})
  - Water: 0.027 sq mi (0.07 km^{2}) 0.07%
- Elevation: 1,562 ft (476 m)

Population (2020)
  - Total: 458
  - Density: 11.3/sq mi (4.36/km^{2})
- GNIS feature ID: 0472109

Buffalo Township is a township in Jewell County, Kansas, United States. As of the 2020 census, its population was 458.

== Geography ==
Buffalo Township covers an area of 40.61 square miles (105.18 square kilometers); of this, 0.03 square miles (0.07 square kilometers) or 0.07 percent is water. The stream of Middle Buffalo Creek runs through this township.

=== Communities ===
- Jewell

=== Adjacent townships ===
- Washington Township (north)
- Grant Township (northeast)
- Vicksburg Township (east)
- Prairie Township (south)
- Browns Creek Township (southwest)
- Calvin Township (west)
- Center Township (northwest)

=== Cemeteries ===
The township contains two cemeteries: Jewell and Wallace.

=== Major highways ===
- K-14
- K-28
- K-148

=== Airports ===
- Willmeth Airport
