= Burr Oak, Kansas =

City in Jewell County, Kansas

- City
- Location within Jewell County and Kansas

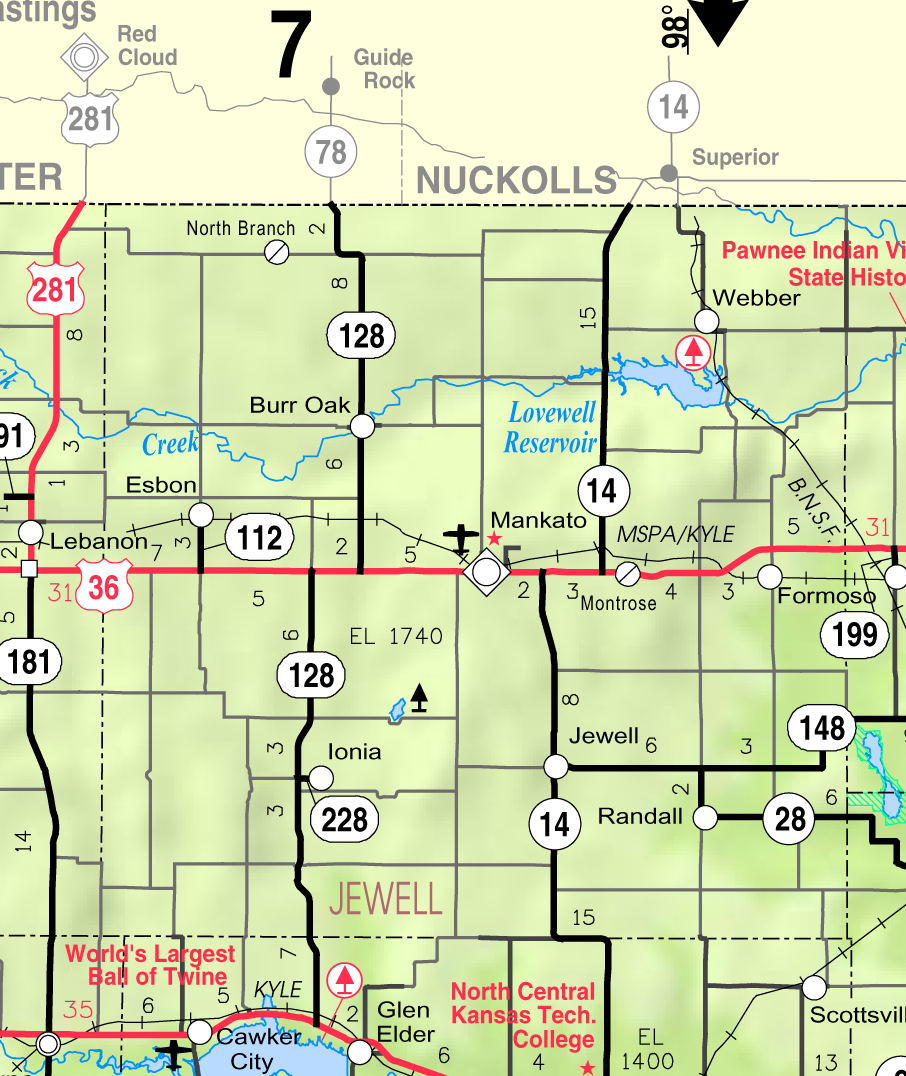
- KDOT map of Jewell County (legend)
- Coordinates: 39°52′12″N 98°18′20″W
- Country: United States
- State: Kansas
- County: Jewell
- Founded: 1870s
- Platted: 1871
- Incorporated: 1880
- Named for: Burr Oak Creek

Area
  - Total: 0.83 sq mi (2.14 km^{2})
  - Land: 0.82 sq mi (2.13 km^{2})
  - Water: 0.0039 sq mi (0.01 km^{2})
- Elevation: 1,657 ft (505 m)

Population (2020)
  - Total: 140
  - Density: 170/sq mi (66/km^{2})
- Time zone: UTC-6 (CST)
  - Summer (DST): UTC-5 (CDT)
- ZIP Code: 66936
- Area code: 785
- FIPS code: 20-09525
- GNIS ID: 2393473

Burr Oak is a city in Jewell County, Kansas, United States. As of the 2020 census, the population of the city was 140.

== History ==
Burr Oak was laid out in 1871, and it was incorporated as a city in 1880. It was named from the Burr Oak Creek.

The first post office in Burr Oak was established in June 1871.

== Geography ==
According to the United States Census Bureau, the city has a total area of 0.83 square miles (2.15 km^{2}), all land.

=== Climate ===
Climate data for Burr Oak 1 N, Kansas (1991–2020 normals, extremes 1900–present)
Month	Jan	Feb	Mar	Apr	May	Jun	Jul	Aug	Sep	Oct	Nov	Dec	Year
Record high °F (°C)	76 (24)	81 (27)	96 (36)	100 (38)	105 (41)	112 (44)	117 (47)	115 (46)	108 (42)	101 (38)	88 (31)	75 (24)	117 (47)
Mean daily maximum °F (°C)	37.9 (3.3)	42.2 (5.7)	53.6 (12.0)	63.8 (17.7)	72.4 (22.4)	83.7 (28.7)	88.2 (31.2)	85.8 (29.9)	78.3 (25.7)	65.7 (18.7)	51.9 (11.1)	40.0 (4.4)	63.6 (17.6)
Daily mean °F (°C)	26.0 (−3.3)	29.8 (−1.2)	40.1 (4.5)	50.0 (10.0)	60.4 (15.8)	71.8 (22.1)	76.4 (24.7)	73.7 (23.2)	65.4 (18.6)	52.3 (11.3)	38.9 (3.8)	28.7 (−1.8)	51.1 (10.6)
Mean daily minimum °F (°C)	14.2 (−9.9)	17.3 (−8.2)	26.5 (−3.1)	36.2 (2.3)	48.4 (9.1)	59.9 (15.5)	64.5 (18.1)	61.6 (16.4)	52.4 (11.3)	38.9 (3.8)	25.9 (−3.4)	17.4 (−8.1)	38.6 (3.7)
Record low °F (°C)	−30 (−34)	−29 (−34)	−21 (−29)	6 (−14)	21 (−6)	34 (1)	45 (7)	36 (2)	22 (−6)	9 (−13)	−19 (−28)	−23 (−31)	−30 (−34)
Average precipitation inches (mm)	0.67 (17)	0.77 (20)	1.47 (37)	2.35 (60)	4.06 (103)	3.77 (96)	4.28 (109)	3.33 (85)	2.39 (61)	2.10 (53)	1.33 (34)	0.96 (24)	27.48 (698)
Average snowfall inches (cm)	5.7 (14)	6.9 (18)	2.7 (6.9)	1.1 (2.8)	0.0 (0.0)	0.0 (0.0)	0.0 (0.0)	0.0 (0.0)	0.0 (0.0)	0.5 (1.3)	2.4 (6.1)	4.4 (11)	23.7 (60)
Average precipitation days (≥ 0.01 in)	5.1	5.2	7.5	8.6	11.3	9.9	9.3	9.0	6.3	6.9	5.6	4.9	89.6
Average snowy days (≥ 0.1 in)	4.4	4.1	2.4	1.0	0.0	0.0	0.0	0.0	0.0	0.3	1.9	3.4	17.5
Source: NOAA

== Demographics ==
Historical population
Census	Pop.	Note	%±
1880	425		—
1890	597		40.5%
1900	671		12.4%
1910	746		11.2%
1920	638		−14.5%
1930	595		−6.7%
1940	560		−5.9%
1950	505		−9.8%
1960	473		−6.3%
1970	426		−9.9%
1980	366		−14.1%
1990	278		−24.0%
2000	265		−4.7%
2010	174		−34.3%
2020	140		−19.5%
U.S. Decennial Census

=== 2020 census ===
The 2020 United States census counted 140 people, 69 households, and 35 families in Burr Oak. The population density was 170.1 per square mile (65.7/km^{2}). There were 119 housing units at an average density of 144.6 per square mile (55.8/km^{2}). The racial makeup was 95.0% (133) white or European American (95.0% non-Hispanic white), 0.0% (0) black or African-American, 0.0% (0) Native American or Alaska Native, 0.0% (0) Asian, 0.0% (0) Pacific Islander or Native Hawaiian, 0.0% (0) from other races, and 5.0% (7) from two or more races. Hispanic or Latino of any race was 2.86% (4) of the population.

Of the 69 households, 11.6% had children under the age of 18; 47.8% were married couples living together; 20.3% had a female householder with no spouse or partner present. 47.8% of households consisted of individuals and 24.6% had someone living alone who was 65 years of age or older. The average household size was 1.7 and the average family size was 1.9. The percent of those with a bachelor's degree or higher was estimated to be 10.7% of the population.

17.1% of the population was under the age of 18, 5.7% from 18 to 24, 18.6% from 25 to 44, 27.1% from 45 to 64, and 31.4% who were 65 years of age or older. The median age was 54.5 years. For every 100 females, there were 102.9 males. For every 100 females ages 18 and older, there were 100.0 males.

The 2016–2020 5-year American Community Survey estimates show that the median household income was $26,136 (with a margin of error of +/- $6,142) and the median family income was $28,125 (+/- $9,364). Males had a median income of $13,750 (+/- $10,339) versus $26,875 (+/- $12,644) for females The median income for those above 16 years old was $17,188 (+/- $13,710). Approximately, 11.8% of families and 25.8% of the population were below the poverty line, including 69.2% of those under the age of 18 and 17.9% of those ages 65 or over.

=== 2010 census ===
As of the census of 2010, there were 174 people, 93 households, and 50 families living in the city. The population density was 209.6 inhabitants per square mile (80.9/km^{2}). There were 144 housing units at an average density of 173.5 per square mile (67.0/km^{2}). The racial makeup of the city was 98.3% White, 0.6% Native American, and 1.1% from two or more races. Hispanic or Latino of any race were 1.7% of the population.

There were 93 households, of which 18.3% had children under the age of 18 living with them, 38.7% were married couples living together, 10.8% had a female householder with no husband present, 4.3% had a male householder with no wife present, and 46.2% were non-families. 44.1% of all households were made up of individuals, and 30.1% had someone living alone who was 65 years of age or older. The average household size was 1.87 and the average family size was 2.52.

The median age in the city was 55 years. 13.8% of residents were under the age of 18; 4.5% were between the ages of 18 and 24; 14.3% were from 25 to 44; 39.7% were from 45 to 64; and 27.6% were 65 years of age or older. The gender makeup of the city was 47.7% male and 52.3% female.

== Education ==
The community is served by Rock Hills USD 107 public school district. Burr Oak became a part of Rock Hills USD 107 located in Mankato in 2006. The Rock Hills High School mascot is Grizzlies.

School unification consolidated Burr Oak and Esbon schools forming White Rock schools in 1983. The White Rock elementary school and high school were located in Burr Oak. White Rock High School's mascot was Eagles. The Jewell-White Rock team was the Predators.

The Burr Oak High School mascot was Braves.
