= Lovewell State Park =

State park in Kansas, United States

- Location within Kansas Location within the United States
- Interactive map of Lovewell State Park
- Location: Jewell County, Kansas, United States
- Coordinates: 39°54′16″N 98°03′03″W
- Area: 1,160 acres (470 ha)
- Elevation: 1,581 ft (482 m)
- Established: 1965
- Administrator: Kansas Department of Wildlife and Parks
- Visitors: 286,389 (in 2022)
- Website: Official website
- Kansas State Parks

Lovewell State Park is a state park in Jewell County, Kansas, United States, located near the city of Webber. The 1,160-acre (470 ha) state park features utility camping, cabins and a beach. The park has access to Lovewell Reservoir.

== See also ==
- List of lakes, reservoirs, and dams in Kansas
- List of rivers of Kansas
