= Lovewell Reservoir =

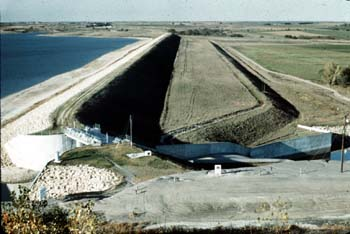
- Lovewell Dam

- Location within Kansas
- Location: Jewell County, Kansas
- Coordinates: 39°53′52″N 98°03′51″W
- Type: Reservoir
- Primary inflows: White Rock Creek
- Primary outflows: White Rock Creek
- Catchment area: 358 sq mi (930 km^{2})
- Basin countries: United States
- Managing agency: U.S. Bureau of Reclamation
- Built: January 27, 1955
- First flooded: October 1, 1957
- Max. length: 11 miles (18 km)
- Surface area: 2,987 acres (12.09 km^{2})
- Max. depth: 35 feet (11 m)
- Water volume: Full: 35,666 acre⋅ft (43,993,000 m^{3}); Current (Nov. 2015): 30,371 acre⋅ft (37,462,000 m^{3})
- Shore length^{1}: 44 miles (71 km)
- Surface elevation: Full: 1,583 ft (482 m); Current (Nov. 2015): 1,581 ft (482 m)
- Settlements: Webber
- ^{1} Shore length is not a well-defined measure.

Lovewell Reservoir is a reservoir in Jewell County, Kansas, United States. Built and managed by the U.S. Bureau of Reclamation, it is used for flood control, irrigation, and recreation. Lovewell State Park is located on its north shore.

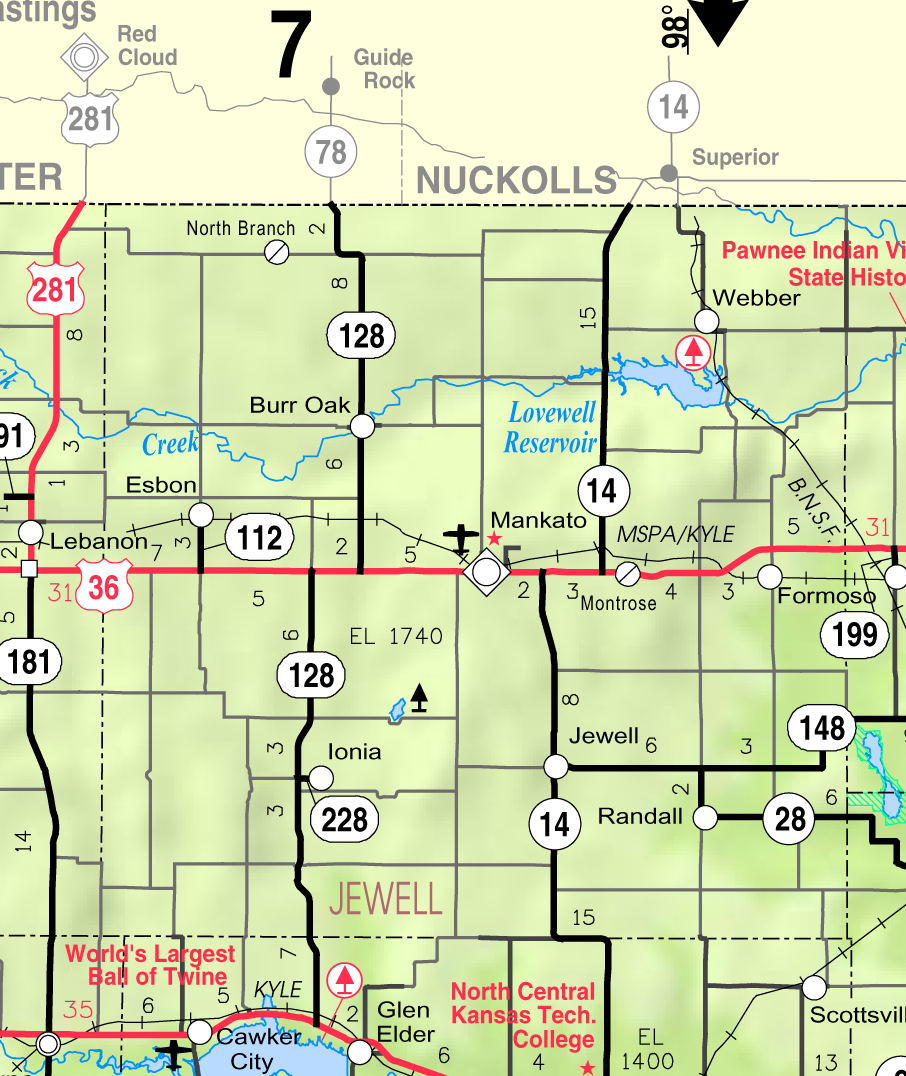
KDOT map of Jewell County

== History ==
A particularly destructive flood of the Republican River in 1935 drove congressmen and senators from Colorado, Kansas, and Nebraska to lobby for the development of a flood control and irrigation project in the river valley. Both the U.S. Army Corps of Engineers and U.S. Bureau of Reclamation produced reports on the viability of the project, ultimately leading to the authorization of the Bostwick Division by the Flood Control Act of 1944 as part of the Pick-Sloan Missouri Basin Program.

Development of the Division was to include construction of Lovewell Dam and Reservoir, named for early Jewell County, Kansas settler Thomas Lovewell, on White Rock Creek, a tributary of the Republican. Contractors started building the dam January 27, 1955. Construction finished in 1957 with filling of the reservoir beginning October 1. The reservoir became operational October 15, 1957.

== Geography ==
Lovewell Reservoir is located at 39°53′52″N 98°03′51″W (39.8977727, -98.0640461) at an elevation of 1,578 feet (481 m). It lies in extreme north-central Kansas in the Smoky Hills region of the Great Plains. The entirety of the reservoir lies within Jewell County.

The reservoir is impounded at its eastern end by Lovewell Dam. The dam is located at 39°53′25″N 98°01′36″W (39.8902899, -98.0267115) at an elevation of 1,617 feet (493 m). White Rock Creek, a tributary of the Republican River, is both the reservoir's primary inflow from the west and outflow to the east. Smaller tributaries include Montana Creek, which flows south into the reservoir's west end, and Johns Creek, which flows north into the reservoir's west end.

Kansas Highway 14 runs north–south immediately west of the reservoir. North Shore Road, a paved county road, runs east–west immediately north of the reservoir.

There is one settlement at Lovewell Reservoir: the small community of Webber, Kansas located roughly 2 miles (3.2 km) north of the reservoir's east end.

== Hydrography ==
The surface area, surface elevation, and water volume of the reservoir fluctuate based on inflow and local climatic conditions. In terms of capacity, the Bureau of Reclamation vertically divides the reservoir into a set of pools based on volume and water level, and it considers the reservoir full when filled to the capacity of its active conservation pool. When full, Lovewell Reservoir has a surface area of 2,987 acres (12.09 km^{2}), a surface elevation of 1,583 feet (482 m), and a volume of 35,666 acre-feet (43,993,000 m^{3}). When filled to maximum capacity, it has a surface area of 7,635 acres (30.90 km^{2}), a surface elevation of 1,610 feet (490 m), and a volume of 180,276 acre-feet (222,367,000 m^{3}).

The streambed underlying the reservoir has an elevation of 1,550 feet (470 m). Since the reservoir's initial flooding, sedimentation has gradually accumulated on the reservoir bottom thus raising its elevation.

== Infrastructure ==
Lovewell Dam is an earth-fill embankment dam with a structural height of 93 feet (28 m) and a length of 8,500 feet (2,600 m). At its crest, the dam has an elevation of 1,616 feet (493 m). A 53-foot (16 m) concrete spillway controlled by two radial gates is located at the south end of the dam and empties into the creek. Just south of the spillway is a gated wasteway outlet controlled by one radial gate which empties into a short outlet canal and stilling basin. When the reservoir is filled to maximum capacity, the spillway has a discharge capacity of 35,000 cu ft/s (990 m^{3}/s), and the gated wasteway outlet has a capacity of 3,200 cu ft/s (91 m^{3}/s).

As part of the Bureau of Reclamation's Bostwick Division, Lovewell Reservoir is connected to a network of canals, reservoirs, and irrigation works that extend across north-central Kansas and south-central Nebraska. A gated outlet from the division's Courtland Canal, located at the north end of Lovewell Dam, provides a second inflow to the reservoir.

== Management ==
The U.S. Bureau of Reclamation operates and maintains Lovewell Dam and Reservoir. The Kansas Department of Wildlife, Parks and Tourism (KDWP) manages 2,215 acres (8.96 km^{2}) of land around the reservoir as the Lovewell Wildlife Area.

== Parks and recreation ==
The KDWP operates Lovewell State Park on the north shore of the reservoir's eastern end. The park includes boat ramps, camping facilities, hiking trails, an information center, a marina, sports facilities, and a swimming beach. It also hosts special events, holiday celebrations, and fishing tournaments throughout the year.

Lovewell Reservoir is open for sport fishing. Lovewell Wildlife Area is open for hunting although it is restricted in some areas.

== Wildlife ==
Fish species resident in the reservoir include channel catfish, crappie, walleye, and wiper. Game animals living around the reservoir include deer, pheasants, quail, rabbits, and turkeys.

== See also ==
- Lovewell State Park
- List of Kansas state parks
- List of lakes, reservoirs, and dams in Kansas
- List of rivers of Kansas
