= Holmwood Township, Kansas =

Holmwood Township
- Township
- Location in Jewell County
- Coordinates: 39°51′18″N 98°12′41″W
- Country: United States
- State: Kansas
- County: Jewell

Area
  - Total: 35.69 sq mi (92.44 km^{2})
  - Land: 35.67 sq mi (92.39 km^{2})
  - Water: 0.019 sq mi (0.05 km^{2}) 0.05%
- Elevation: 1,781 ft (543 m)

Population (2020)
  - Total: 42
  - Density: 1.2/sq mi (0.45/km^{2})
- GNIS feature ID: 0471869

Holmwood Township is a township in Jewell County, Kansas, United States. As of the 2020 census, its population was 42.

== Geography ==
Holmwood Township covers an area of 35.69 square miles (92.44 square kilometers); of this, 0.02 square miles (0.05 square kilometers) or 0.05 percent is water. The streams of Antelope Creek, Big Timber Creek, East Fork Big Timber Creek, Korb Creek, Long Branch, Lost Creek, Norway Creek, Oak Creek, Oak Creek, Porcupine Creek, Spring Creek and Troublesome Creek run through this township.

=== Adjacent townships ===
- Harrison Township (north)
- Montana Township (northeast)
- Richland Township (east)
- Washington Township (southeast)
- Center Township (south)
- Limestone Township (southwest)
- Burr Oak Township (west)
- Walnut Township (northwest)
