= Ionia, Kansas =

Unincorporated community in Jewell County, Kansas

- Unincorporated community and CDP
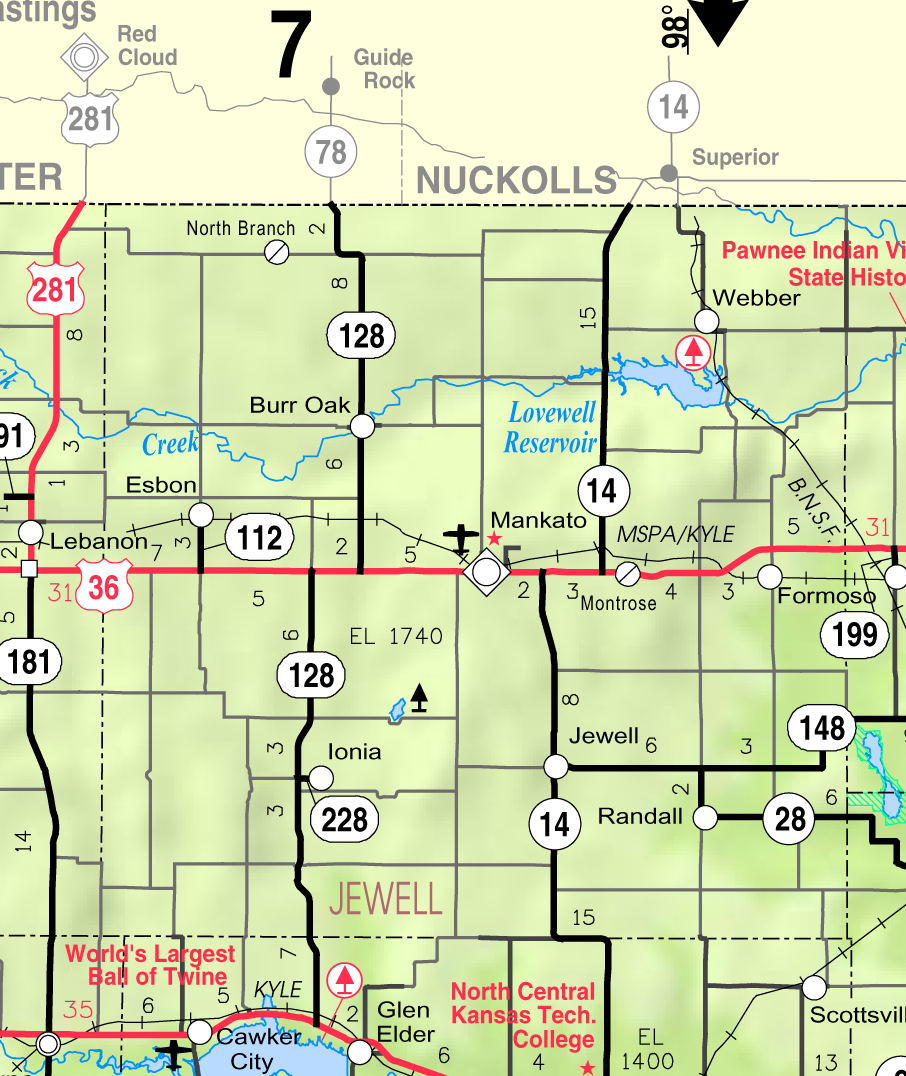
- KDOT map of Jewell County (legend)

- Location within Kansas Location within the United States
- Coordinates: 39°39′50″N 98°20′51″W
- Country: United States
- State: Kansas
- County: Jewell
- Elevation: 1,539 ft (469 m)

Population (2020)
  - Total: 17
- Time zone: UTC−6 (CST)
  - Summer (DST): UTC−5 (CDT)
- ZIP Code: 66949
- Area code: 785
- FIPS code: 20-34350
- GNIS ID: 472094

Ionia is an unincorporated community and census-designated place (CDP) in Ionia Township, Jewell County, Kansas, United States. As of the 2020 census, the population was 17.

== History ==
Ionia was homesteaded in 1869 and settled in 1870.

In 1871, a post office opened in Ionia, which was discontinued in 1982.

== Demographics ==
Historical population
Census	Pop.	Note	%±
2020	17		—
U.S. Decennial Census

The 2020 United States census counted 17 people, 9 households, and 5 families in Ionia. The population density was 17.5 per square mile (6.7/km^{2}). There were 19 housing units at an average density of 19.5 per square mile (7.5/km^{2}). The racial makeup was 100.0% (17) white or European American (100.0% non-Hispanic white), 0.0% (0) black or African-American, 0.0% (0) Native American or Alaska Native, 0.0% (0) Asian, 0.0% (0) Pacific Islander or Native Hawaiian, 0.0% (0) from other races, and 0.0% (0) from two or more races. Hispanic or Latino of any race was 0.0% (0) of the population.

Of the 9 households, 22.2% had children under the age of 18; 33.3% were married couples living together; 33.3% had a female householder with no spouse or partner present. 33.3% of households consisted of individuals and 11.1% had someone living alone who was 65 years of age or older. The percent of those with a bachelor's degree or higher was estimated to be 0.0% of the population.

0.0% of the population was under the age of 18, 5.9% from 18 to 24, 17.6% from 25 to 44, 17.6% from 45 to 64, and 58.8% who were 65 years of age or older. The median age was 67.5 years. For every 100 females, there were 41.7 males. For every 100 females ages 18 and older, there were 41.7 males.

== Education ==
The community is served by Rock Hills USD 107 public school district.

== See also ==
- Waconda Lake and Glen Elder State Park.
