= Esbon, Kansas =

City in Jewell County, Kansas

- City
- Location within Jewell County and Kansas

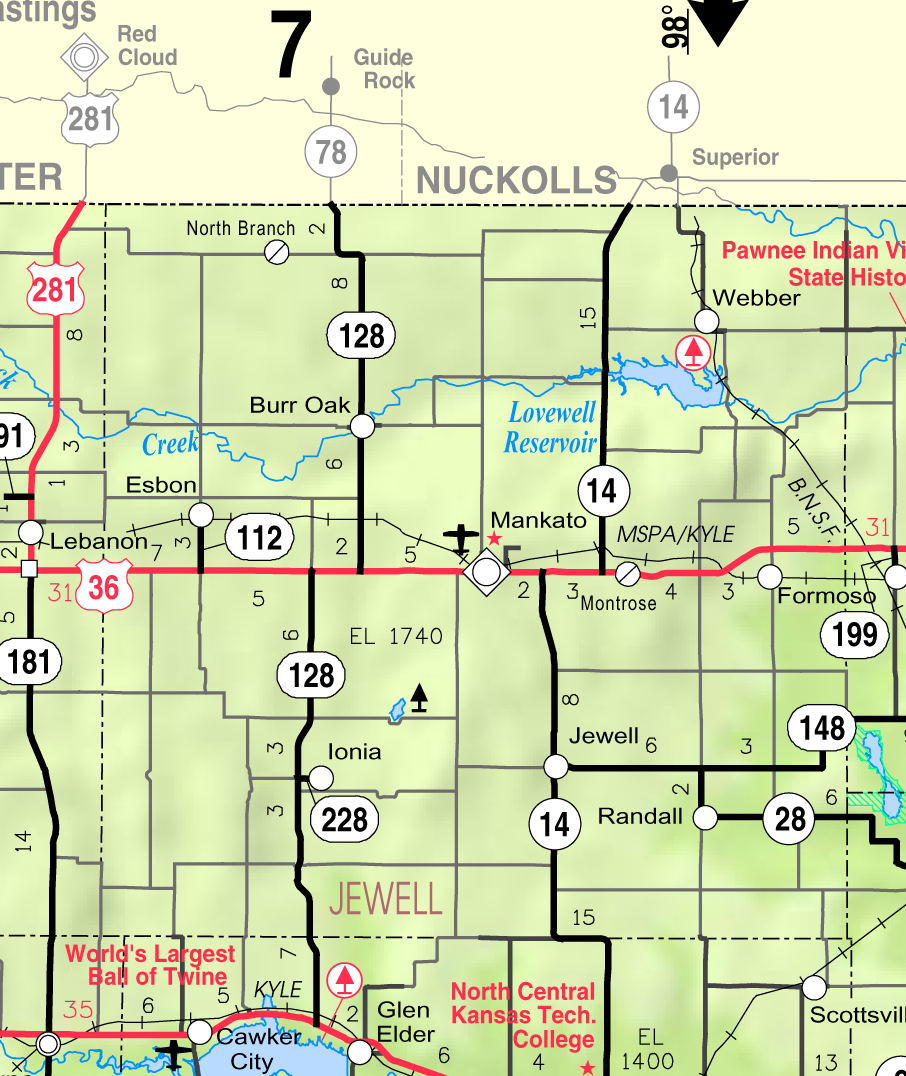
- KDOT map of Jewell County (legend)
- Coordinates: 39°49′19″N 98°26′01″W
- Country: United States
- State: Kansas
- County: Jewell
- Founded: 1870s
- Platted: 1873
- Incorporated: 1904

Area
  - Total: 0.28 sq mi (0.73 km^{2})
  - Land: 0.28 sq mi (0.73 km^{2})
  - Water: 0 sq mi (0.00 km^{2})
- Elevation: 1,834 ft (559 m)

Population (2020)
  - Total: 69
  - Density: 240/sq mi (95/km^{2})
- Time zone: UTC-6 (CST)
  - Summer (DST): UTC-5 (CDT)
- ZIP Code: 66941
- Area code: 785
- FIPS code: 20-21600
- GNIS ID: 2394700

Esbon is a city in Jewell County, Kansas, United States. As of the 2020 census, the population of the city was 69.

== History ==
Esbon was laid out in 1873. It was incorporated as a city in 1904.

The first post office in Esbon was established in January 1874.

Esbon was a shipping point on the Chicago, Rock Island and Pacific Railroad.

== Geography ==
According to the United States Census Bureau, the city has a total area of 0.31 square miles (0.80 km^{2}), all land.

The town lies 2.5 miles north of U.S. Route 36 and 13 miles west of Mankato, the county seat of Jewell County.

== Demographics ==
Historical population
Census	Pop.	Note	%±
1910	347		—
1920	375		8.1%
1930	319		−14.9%
1940	292		−8.5%
1950	278		−4.8%
1960	237		−14.7%
1970	206		−13.1%
1980	234		13.6%
1990	167		−28.6%
2000	148		−11.4%
2010	99		−33.1%
2020	69		−30.3%
U.S. Decennial Census

=== 2020 census ===
The 2020 United States census counted 69 people, 44 households, and 25 families in Esbon. The population density was 245.6 per square mile (94.8/km^{2}). There were 70 housing units at an average density of 249.1 per square mile (96.2/km^{2}). The racial makeup was 92.75% (64) white or European American (92.75% non-Hispanic white), 0.0% (0) black or African-American, 1.45% (1) Native American or Alaska Native, 1.45% (1) Asian, 0.0% (0) Pacific Islander or Native Hawaiian, 0.0% (0) from other races, and 4.35% (3) from two or more races. Hispanic or Latino of any race was 0.0% (0) of the population.

Of the 44 households, 15.9% had children under the age of 18; 45.5% were married couples living together; 18.2% had a female householder with no spouse or partner present. 40.9% of households consisted of individuals and 15.9% had someone living alone who was 65 years of age or older. The average household size was 1.3 and the average family size was 2.1. The percent of those with a bachelor's degree or higher was estimated to be 10.1% of the population.

10.1% of the population was under the age of 18, 2.9% from 18 to 24, 15.9% from 25 to 44, 36.2% from 45 to 64, and 34.8% who were 65 years of age or older. The median age was 58.5 years. For every 100 females, there were 109.1 males. For every 100 females ages 18 and older, there were 121.4 males.

The 2016–2020 5-year American Community Survey estimates show that the median household income was $19,583 (with a margin of error of +/- $19,320) and the median family income was $51,250 (+/- $17,899). Approximately, 14.3% of families and 31.1% of the population were below the poverty line, including 50.0% of those under the age of 18 and 26.1% of those ages 65 or over.

=== 2010 census ===
As of the census of 2010, there were 99 people, 52 households, and 24 families living in the city. The population density was 319.4 inhabitants per square mile (123.3/km^{2}). There were 84 housing units at an average density of 271.0 per square mile (104.6/km^{2}). The racial makeup of the city was 91.9% White, 1.0% African American, 3.0% Native American, and 4.0% from two or more races. Hispanic or Latino of any race were 1.0% of the population.

There were 52 households, of which 19.2% had children under the age of 18 living with them, 38.5% were married couples living together, 1.9% had a female householder with no husband present, 5.8% had a male householder with no wife present, and 53.8% were non-families. 48.1% of all households were made up of individuals, and 21.2% had someone living alone who was 65 years of age or older. The average household size was 1.90 and the average family size was 2.67.

The median age in the city was 52.3 years. 19.2% of residents were under the age of 18; 4.1% were between the ages of 18 and 24; 18.2% were from 25 to 44; 28.4% were from 45 to 64; and 30.3% were 65 years of age or older. The gender makeup of the city was 54.5% male and 45.5% female.

=== Religion ===
The community has a Roman Catholic church (Sacred Heart), a United Methodist Church, and a Church of Christ.

== Economy ==
The primary business enterprise of the town is a grain elevator at the north end of Grand Avenue. Farming is the principal occupation in the area around Esbon.

== Education ==
The community is served by Rock Hills USD 107 public school district. Esbon became a part of Rock Hills USD 107 located in Mankato in 2006 as the district was formed that year by the consolidation of White Rock USD 104 and Mankato USD 278. The Rock Hills High School mascot is Grizzlies. Esbon had an elementary school and high school until 1983. The Esbon High School mascot was Esbon Tigers.

The Esbon Tigers won the Kansas State High School boys class B Track & Field championship in 1947.

School unification consolidated Esbon and Burr Oak schools forming White Rock schools in 1983. Esbon was home of White Rock Middle school located at 203 Grand Ave. The White Rock elementary school and high school were located in Burr Oak. White Rock High School's mascot was the Eagles.
