= White Mound Township, Kansas =

White Mound Township
- Township
- Location in Jewell County
- Coordinates: 39°53′31″N 98°27′16″W
- Country: United States
- State: Kansas
- County: Jewell

Area
  - Total: 35.78 sq mi (92.66 km^{2})
  - Land: 35.73 sq mi (92.55 km^{2})
  - Water: 0.042 sq mi (0.11 km^{2}) 0.12%
- Elevation: 1,781 ft (543 m)

Population (2020)
  - Total: 52
  - Density: 1.5/sq mi (0.56/km^{2})
- GNIS feature ID: 0471849

White Mound Township is a township in Jewell County, Kansas, United States. As of the 2020 census, its population was 52.

== Geography ==
White Mound Township covers an area of 35.78 square miles (92.66 square kilometers); of this, 0.04 square miles (0.11 square kilometers) or 0.12 percent is water. The streams of Ash Creek, Ayres Creek, North Branch White Rock Creek and Smith Creek run through this township.

=== Adjacent townships ===
- Highland Township (north)
- Walnut Township (northeast)
- Burr Oak Township (east)
- Limestone Township (southeast)
- Esbon Township (south)
- Oak Township, Smith County (southwest)
- White Rock Township, Smith County (west)
- Logan Township, Smith County (northwest)

=== Cemeteries ===
The township contains three cemeteries: Oak Creek, Providence and Salem.
