= Harrison Township, Jewell County, Kansas =

Harrison Township
- Township
- Location in Jewell County
- Coordinates: 39°58′02″N 98°12′31″W
- Country: United States
- State: Kansas
- County: Jewell

Area
  - Total: 35.78 sq mi (92.67 km^{2})
  - Land: 35.78 sq mi (92.67 km^{2})
  - Water: 0 sq mi (0 km^{2}) 0%
- Elevation: 1,795 ft (547 m)

Population (2020)
  - Total: 46
  - Density: 1.3/sq mi (0.50/km^{2})
- GNIS feature ID: 0471863

Harrison Township is a township in Jewell County, Kansas, USA. As of the 2020 census, its population was 46.

== Geography ==
Harrison Township covers an area of 35.78 square miles (92.67 square kilometers).

=== Adjacent townships ===
- Montana Township (east)
- Richland Township (southeast)
- Holmwood Township (south)
- Burr Oak Township (southwest)
- Walnut Township (west)

=== Cemeteries ===
The township contains three cemeteries: Cleveland, Olive Hill and Shaffer.
