= Montrose, Kansas =

Unincorporated community in Jewell County, Kansas

- Unincorporated community
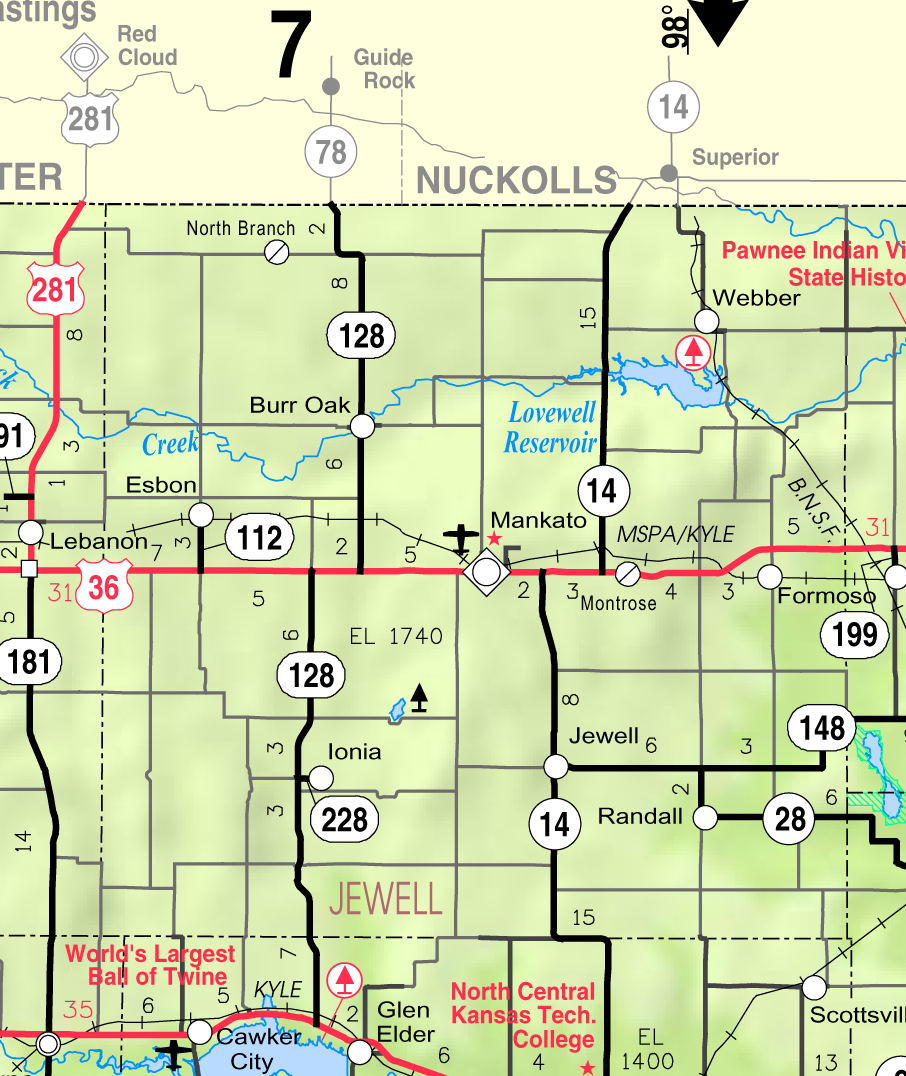
- KDOT map of Jewell County (legend)

- Location within Kansas Location within the United States
- Coordinates: 39°47′4″N 98°5′16″W
- Country: United States
- State: Kansas
- County: Jewell
- Elevation: 1,644 ft (501 m)
- Time zone: UTC-6 (CST)
  - Summer (DST): UTC-5 (CDT)
- Area code: 785
- FIPS code: 20-48000
- GNIS ID: 472005

Montrose is an unincorporated community in Jewell County, Kansas, United States.

== History ==
A post office was first established as Delta in 1880, and the settlement was moved to the current site with the arrival of the Rock Island Railroad, and it was renamed Montrose in 1888. The origin of the name Montrose is obscure.

== Education ==
The community is served by Rock Hills USD 107 public school district.
