= North Branch, Kansas =

Unincorporated community in Jewell County, Kansas

- Unincorporated community
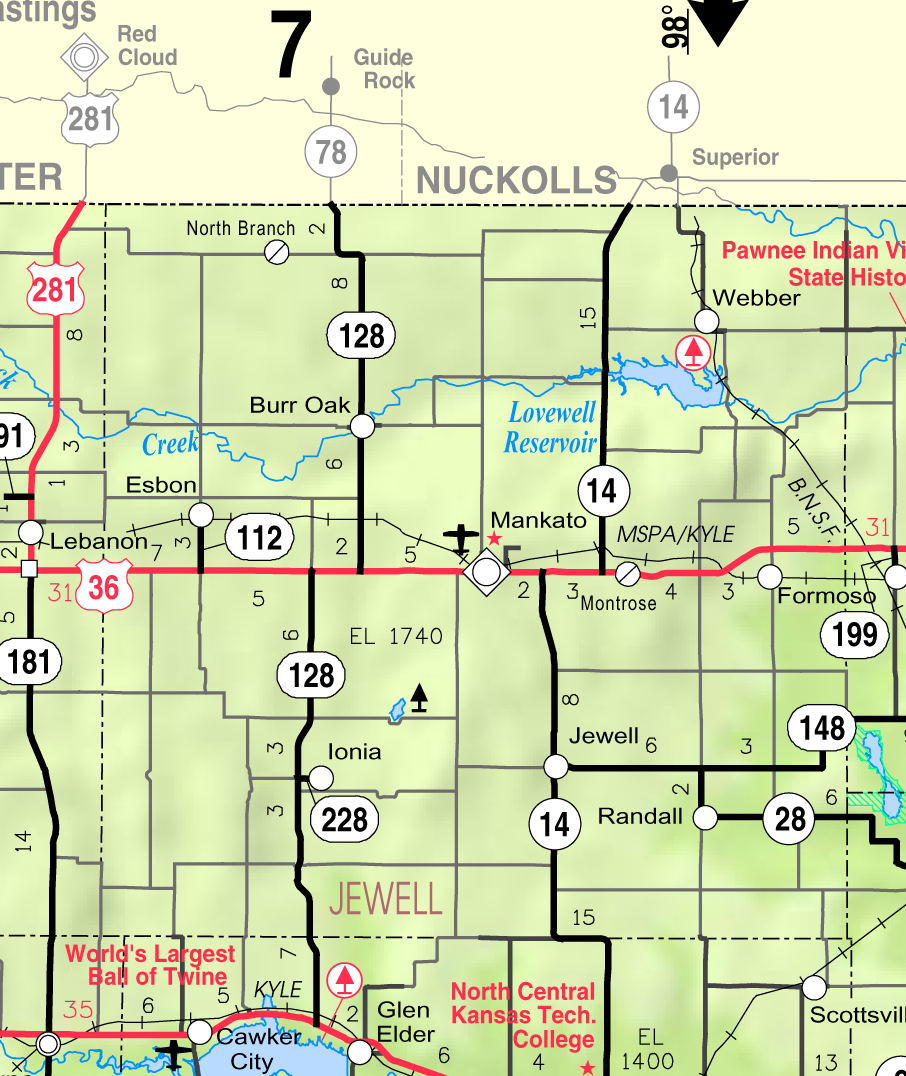
- KDOT map of Jewell County (legend)

- Location within Kansas Location within the United States
- Coordinates: 39°58′22″N 98°22′18″W
- Country: United States
- State: Kansas
- County: Jewell
- Elevation: 1,870 ft (570 m)
- Time zone: UTC-6 (CST)
  - Summer (DST): UTC-5 (CDT)
- Area code: 785
- FIPS code: 20-51075
- GNIS ID: 482708

North Branch is an unincorporated community in Jewell County, Kansas, United States. It is located two miles south of the Nebraska/Kansas state line at the intersection of Cedar Rd and 78 Rd.

== History ==
Also known as Northbranch. North Branch had a post office from the 1870s until 1959.

== Education ==
The community is served by Rock Hills USD 107 public school district.
