= Otego, Kansas =

Unincorporated community in Jewell County, Kansas

- Unincorporated community
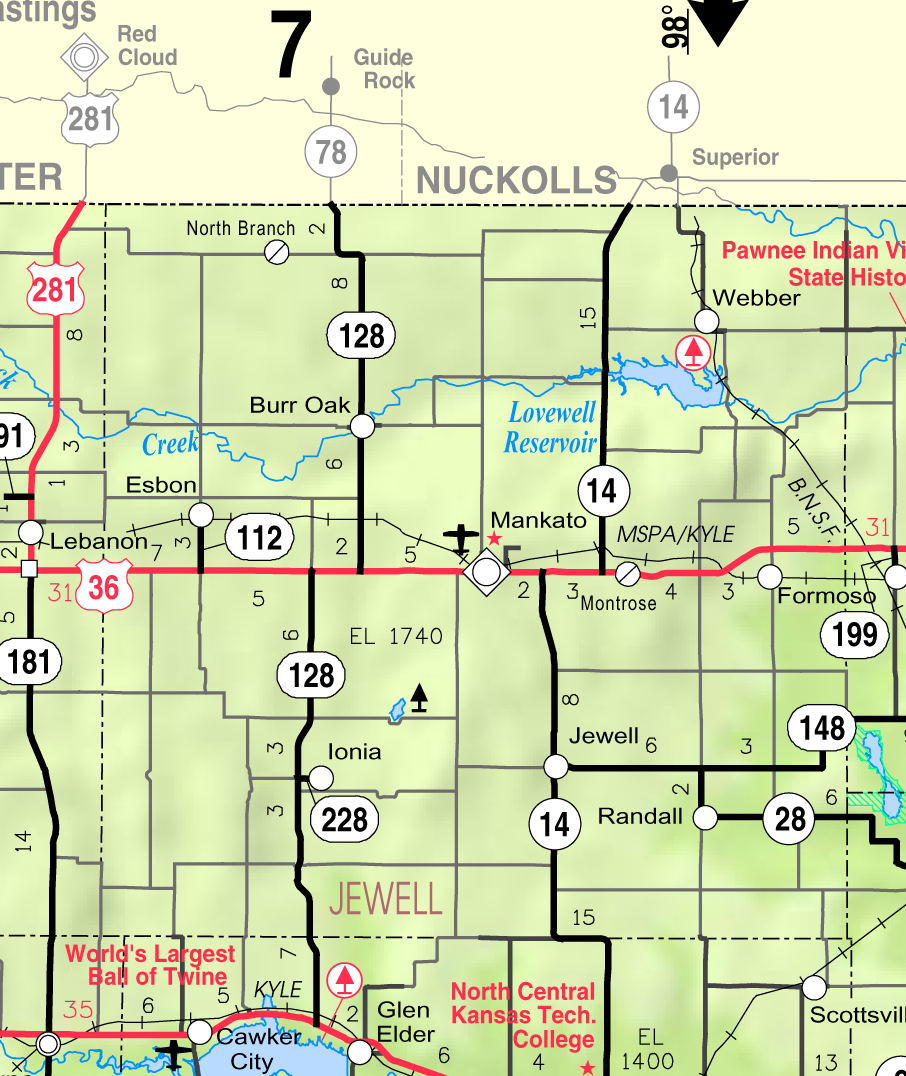
- KDOT map of Jewell County (legend)

- Location within Kansas Location within the United States
- Coordinates: 39°49′38″N 98°20′50″W
- Country: United States
- State: Kansas
- County: Jewell
- Elevation: 1,795 ft (547 m)
- Time zone: UTC-6 (CST)
  - Summer (DST): UTC-5 (CDT)
- Area code: 785
- FIPS code: 20-53500
- GNIS ID: 484588

Otego is an unincorporated community in Jewell County, Kansas, United States.

== History ==
A post office was opened in Otego in 1887, and remained in operation until it was discontinued in 1954.

== Education ==
The community is served by Rock Hills USD 107 public school district.
