= Rock Hills USD 107 =

Public school district in Mankato, Kansas

Address
- 109 E. Main St. Mankato, Kansas, 66956; United States
- Coordinates: 39°47′8″N 98°12′33″W

District information
- Type: Public
- Grades: K to 12
- Schools: 4

Other information
- Website: usd107.org

Rock Hills USD 107 is a public unified school district headquartered in Mankato, Kansas, United States. The district includes the communities of Mankato, Burr Oak, Esbon, Formoso, Jewell, Webber, Ionia, Lovewell, Montrose, North Branch, Otego, and nearby rural areas.

== Schools ==
The school district operates the following schools:

- Rock Hills High School
- Jewell Junior High School
- Rock Hills Middle School
- Rock Hills Elementary School

== History ==
In 1945 (after World War II), the School Reorganization Act in Kansas caused the consolidation of thousands of rural school districts in Kansas.

In 1963, the School Unification Act in Kansas caused the further consolidatation of thousands of tiny school districts into hundreds of larger Unified School Districts.

USD 107 was formed in 2006 by the consolidation of White Rock USD 104 and Mankato USD 278.

In 2009, it had absorbed some territory from Jewell USD 279 due to that district's dissolution.

== See also ==
- Kansas State Department of Education
- Kansas State High School Activities Association
- List of high schools in Kansas
- List of unified school districts in Kansas
