= Webber, Kansas =

City in Jewell County, Kansas

- City
- Location within Jewell County and Kansas

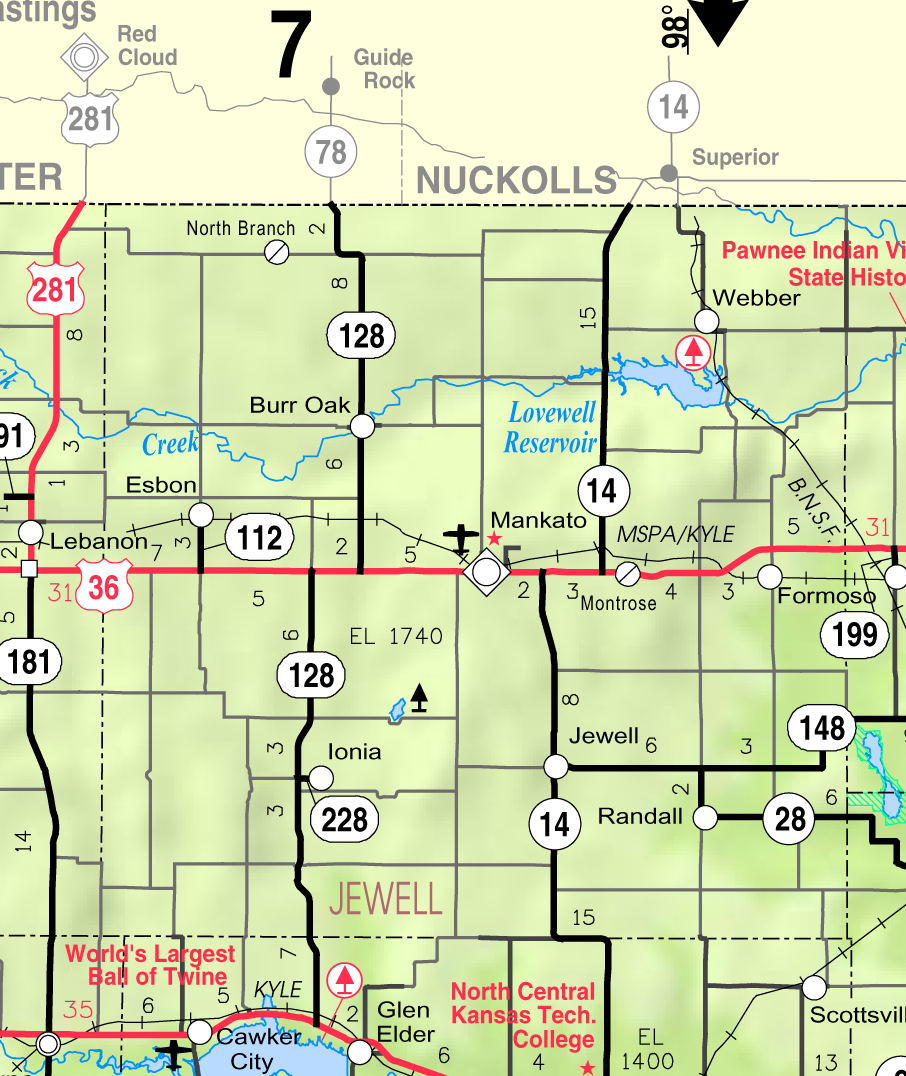
- KDOT map of Jewell County (legend)
- Coordinates: 39°56′04″N 98°02′06″W
- Country: United States
- State: Kansas
- County: Jewell
- Founded: 1880s
- Incorporated: 1925
- Named for: Dan Webber

Area
  - Total: 0.12 sq mi (0.30 km^{2})
  - Land: 0.12 sq mi (0.30 km^{2})
  - Water: 0 sq mi (0.00 km^{2})
- Elevation: 1,667 ft (508 m)

Population (2020)
  - Total: 30
  - Density: 260/sq mi (100/km^{2})
- Time zone: UTC-6 (CST)
  - Summer (DST): UTC-5 (CDT)
- ZIP Code: 66970
- Area code: 785
- FIPS code: 20-76250
- GNIS ID: 2397240

Webber is a city in Jewell County, Kansas, United States. As of the 2020 census, the population of the city was 30.

== History ==
In 1887, Atchison, Topeka and Santa Fe Railway built a branch line from Neva (three miles west of Strong City) through Webber to Superior, Nebraska. In 1996, the Atchison, Topeka and Santa Fe Railway merged with Burlington Northern Railroad and renamed to the current BNSF Railway. Most locals still refer to this railroad as the "Santa Fe".

The first post office in Webber was established in November 1889. The community was named for Dan Webber, an original landowner.

== Geography ==
According to the United States Census Bureau, the city has a total area of 0.11 square miles (0.28 km^{2}), all land.

== Demographics ==
Historical population
Census	Pop.	Note	%±
1930	126		—
1940	104		−17.5%
1950	96		−7.7%
1960	58		−39.6%
1970	49		−15.5%
1980	53		8.2%
1990	39		−26.4%
2000	37		−5.1%
2010	25		−32.4%
2020	30		20.0%
U.S. Decennial Census

=== 2010 census ===
As of the census of 2010, there were 25 people, 13 households, and 8 families living in the city. The population density was 227.3 inhabitants per square mile (87.8/km^{2}). There were 27 housing units at an average density of 245.5 per square mile (94.8/km^{2}). The racial makeup of the city was 100.0% White.

There were 13 households, of which 7.7% had children under the age of 18 living with them, 61.5% were married couples living together, and 38.5% were non-families. 38.5% of all households were made up of individuals, and 7.7% had someone living alone who was 65 years of age or older. The average household size was 1.92 and the average family size was 2.50.

The median age in the city was 58.8 years. 4% of residents were under the age of 18; 0.0% were between the ages of 18 and 24; 8% were from 25 to 44; 52% were from 45 to 64; and 36% were 65 years of age or older. The gender makeup of the city was 68.0% male and 32.0% female.

=== 2000 census ===
As of the census of 2000, there were 37 people, 20 households, and 14 families living in the city. The population density was 333.8 inhabitants per square mile (128.9/km^{2}). There were 25 housing units at an average density of 225.6 per square mile (87.1/km^{2}). The racial makeup of the city was 100.00% White.

There were 20 households, out of which 10.0% had children under the age of 18 living with them, 60.0% were married couples living together, 5.0% had a female householder with no husband present, and 30.0% were non-families. 30.0% of all households were made up of individuals, and 20.0% had someone living alone who was 65 years of age or older. The average household size was 1.85 and the average family size was 2.21.

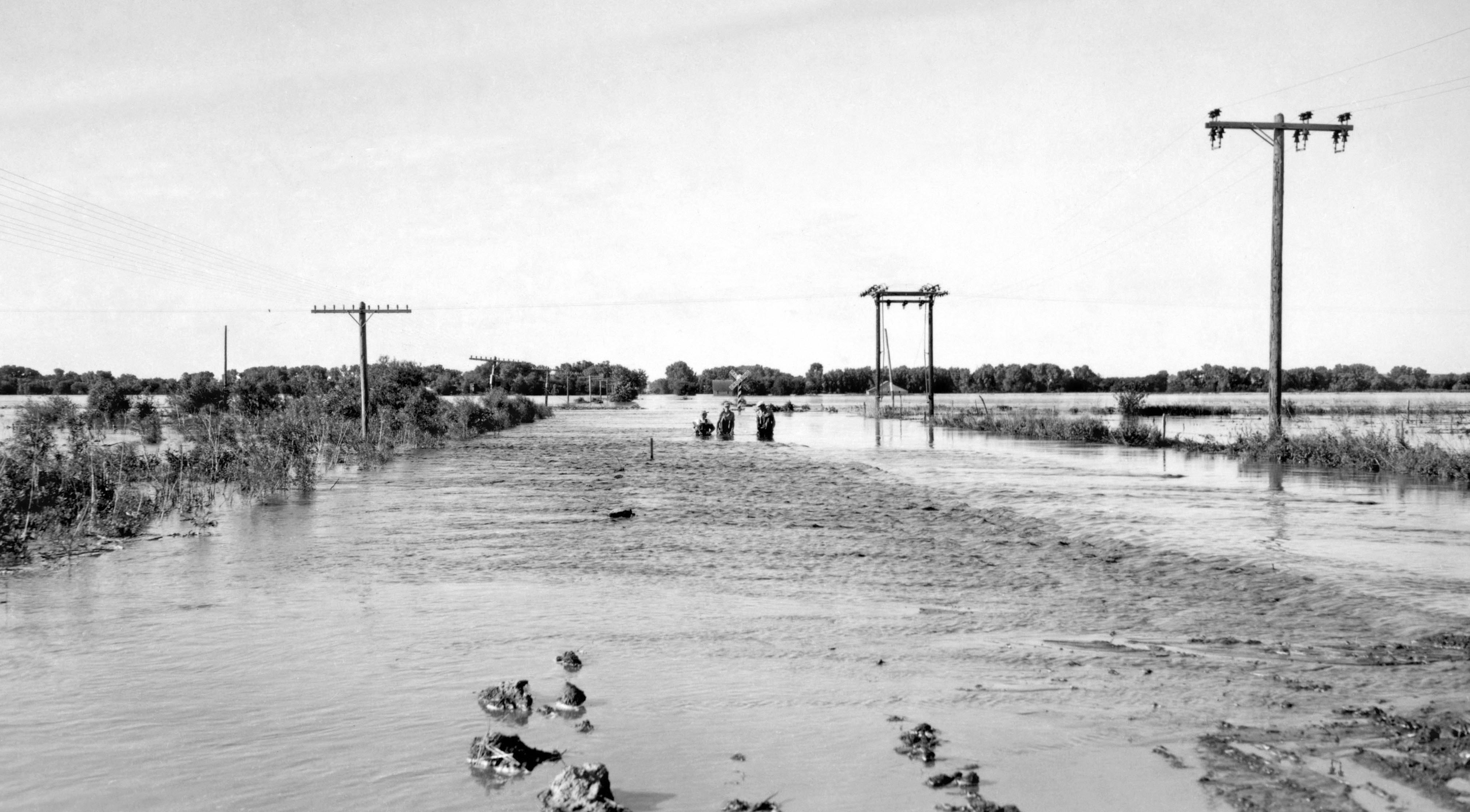
June 24, 1947 flood of the Republican River on the border of Jewell County, Kansas and Republic County, Kansas near Hardy, Nebraska and Webber, Kansas, just south of Nebraska NE-8 on Kansas 1 Rd/CR-1 bridge over the Republican River. The normal flood stage for the river is at the tree line in the foreground.

In the city, the population was spread out, with 10.8% under the age of 18, 16.2% from 25 to 44, 24.3% from 45 to 64, and 48.6% who were 65 years of age or older. The median age was 65 years. For every 100 females, there were 131.3 males. For every 100 females age 18 and over, there were 120.0 males.

The median income for a household in the city was $25,417, and the median income for a family was $26,250. Males had a median income of $16,250 versus $23,750 for females. The per capita income for the city was $11,769. None of the population and none of the families were below the poverty line.

== Education ==
The community is served by Rock Hills USD 107 public school district. It was formed in 2006 by the consolidation of White Rock USD 104 and Mankato USD 278.

== See also ==
- Lovewell Reservoir and Lovewell State Park
