= Formoso, Kansas =

City in Jewell County, Kansas

- City
- Location within Jewell County and Kansas

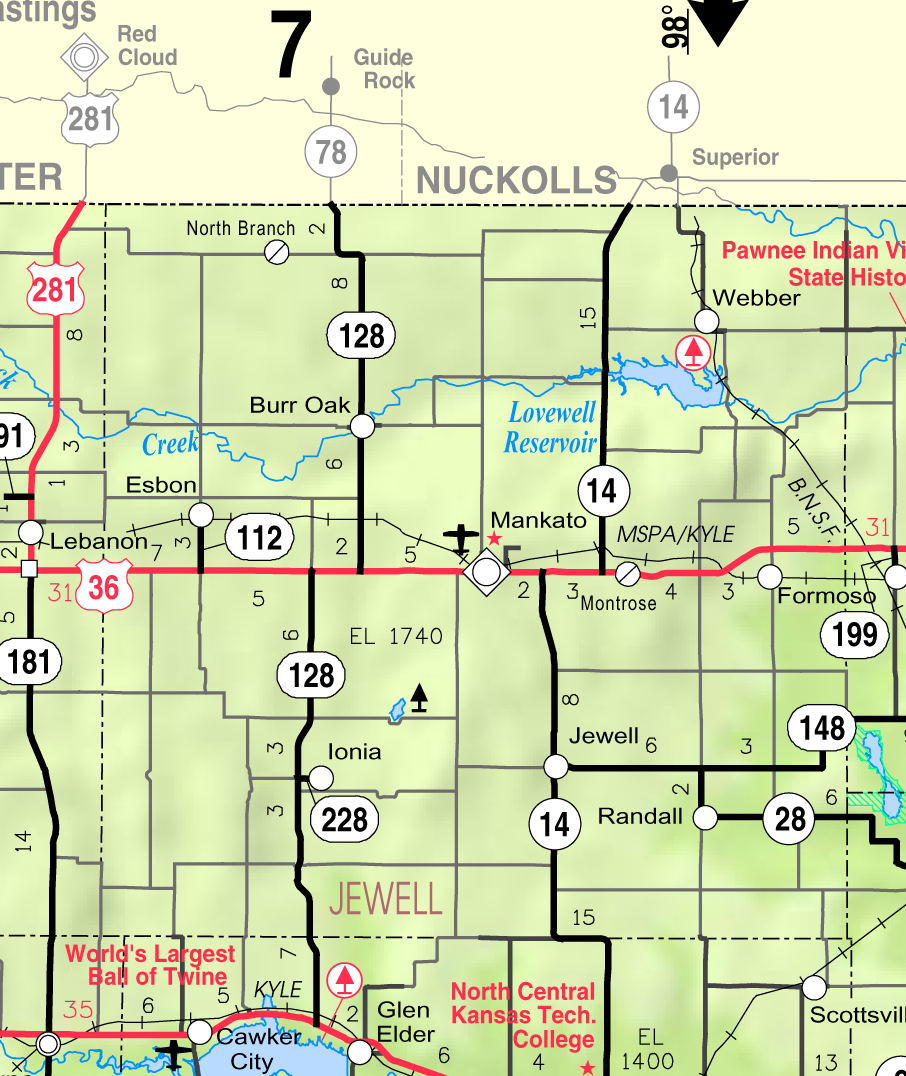
- KDOT map of Jewell County (legend)
- Coordinates: 39°46′43″N 97°59′34″W
- Country: United States
- State: Kansas
- County: Jewell
- Founded: 1880s
- Incorporated: 1882

Area
  - Total: 0.25 sq mi (0.64 km^{2})
  - Land: 0.25 sq mi (0.64 km^{2})
  - Water: 0 sq mi (0.00 km^{2})
- Elevation: 1,526 ft (465 m)

Population (2020)
  - Total: 94
  - Density: 380/sq mi (150/km^{2})
- Time zone: UTC-6 (CST)
  - Summer (DST): UTC-5 (CDT)
- ZIP Code: 66942
- Area code: 785
- FIPS code: 20-23825
- GNIS ID: 2394792

Formoso is a city in Jewell County, Kansas, United States. As of the 2020 census, the population of the city was 94.

== History ==
The first post office at Formoso was established in December 1887.

Formoso was founded circa 1889.

== Geography ==
According to the United States Census Bureau, the city has a total area of 0.28 square miles (0.73 km^{2}), all land.

== Demographics ==
Historical population
Census	Pop.	Note	%±
1910	453		—
1920	374		−17.4%
1930	381		1.9%
1940	293		−23.1%
1950	271		−7.5%
1960	192		−29.2%
1970	180		−6.2%
1980	166		−7.8%
1990	128		−22.9%
2000	129		0.8%
2010	93		−27.9%
2020	94		1.1%
U.S. Decennial Census

=== 2020 census ===
The 2020 United States census counted 94 people, 43 households, and 22 families in Formoso. The population density was 380.6 per square mile (146.9/km^{2}). There were 52 housing units at an average density of 210.5 per square mile (81.3/km^{2}). The racial makeup was 87.23% (82) white or European American (86.17% non-Hispanic white), 0.0% (0) black or African-American, 0.0% (0) Native American or Alaska Native, 0.0% (0) Asian, 0.0% (0) Pacific Islander or Native Hawaiian, 3.19% (3) from other races, and 9.57% (9) from two or more races. Hispanic or Latino of any race was 9.57% (9) of the population.

Of the 43 households, 27.9% had children under the age of 18; 41.9% were married couples living together; 32.6% had a female householder with no spouse or partner present. 41.9% of households consisted of individuals and 25.6% had someone living alone who was 65 years of age or older. The average household size was 1.9 and the average family size was 2.4. The percent of those with a bachelor's degree or higher was estimated to be 9.6% of the population.

33.0% of the population was under the age of 18, 0.0% from 18 to 24, 25.5% from 25 to 44, 17.0% from 45 to 64, and 24.5% who were 65 years of age or older. The median age was 37.5 years. For every 100 females, there were 91.8 males. For every 100 females ages 18 and older, there were 117.2 males.

The 2016–2020 5-year American Community Survey estimates show that the median household income was $28,295 (with a margin of error of +/- $9,417) and the median family income was $29,432 (+/- $14,837). Males had a median income of $26,250 (+/- $7,200). Approximately, 17.1% of families and 18.6% of the population were below the poverty line, including 5.6% of those under the age of 18 and 31.0% of those ages 65 or over.

=== 2010 census ===
As of the census of 2010, there were 93 people, 48 households, and 26 families living in the city. The population density was 332.1 inhabitants per square mile (128.2/km^{2}). There were 65 housing units at an average density of 232.1 per square mile (89.6/km^{2}). The racial makeup of the city was 98.9% White and 1.1% from two or more races. Hispanic or Latino of any race were 1.1% of the population.

There were 48 households, of which 14.6% had children under the age of 18 living with them, 39.6% were married couples living together, 8.3% had a female householder with no husband present, 6.3% had a male householder with no wife present, and 45.8% were non-families. 41.7% of all households were made up of individuals, and 20.8% had someone living alone who was 65 years of age or older. The average household size was 1.94 and the average family size was 2.54.

The median age in the city was 56.5 years. 18.3% of residents were under the age of 18; 2.3% were between the ages of 18 and 24; 14% were from 25 to 44; 28% were from 45 to 64; and 37.6% were 65 years of age or older. The gender makeup of the city was 55.9% male and 44.1% female.

== Education ==
The community is served by Rock Hills USD 107 public school district. It was formed in 2006 by the consolidation of White Rock USD 104 and Mankato USD 278. The Rock Hills High School mascot is Rock Hills Grizzlies.

Formoso schools closed through school unification. The Formoso High School mascot was Formoso Falcons.

== Notable people ==
- John Mills Houston, politician
