= Calvin Township, Kansas =

Calvin Township
- Township
- Location in Jewell County
- Coordinates: 39°41′58″N 98°12′36″W
- Country: United States
- State: Kansas
- County: Jewell

Area
  - Total: 31.4 sq mi (81.4 km^{2})
  - Land: 31.42 sq mi (81.37 km^{2})
  - Water: 0.015 sq mi (0.04 km^{2}) 0.05%
- Elevation: 1,749 ft (533 m)

Population (2020)
  - Total: 36
  - Density: 1.1/sq mi (0.44/km^{2})
- GNIS feature ID: 0472100

Calvin Township is a township in Jewell County, Kansas, USA. As of the 2020 census, its population was 36.

== Geography ==
Calvin Township covers an area of 31.43 square miles (81.4 square kilometers); of this, 0.01 square miles (0.04 square kilometers) or 0.05 percent is water.

=== Adjacent townships ===
- Center Township (north)
- Washington Township (northeast)
- Buffalo Township (east)
- Browns Creek Township (south)
- Athens Township (southwest)
- Ionia Township (west)
- Limestone Township (northwest)

=== Cemeteries ===
The township contains one cemetery, McGehee.

=== Major highways ===
- K-14
- K-28
