= Jewell County, Kansas =

County in Kansas, United States

- County
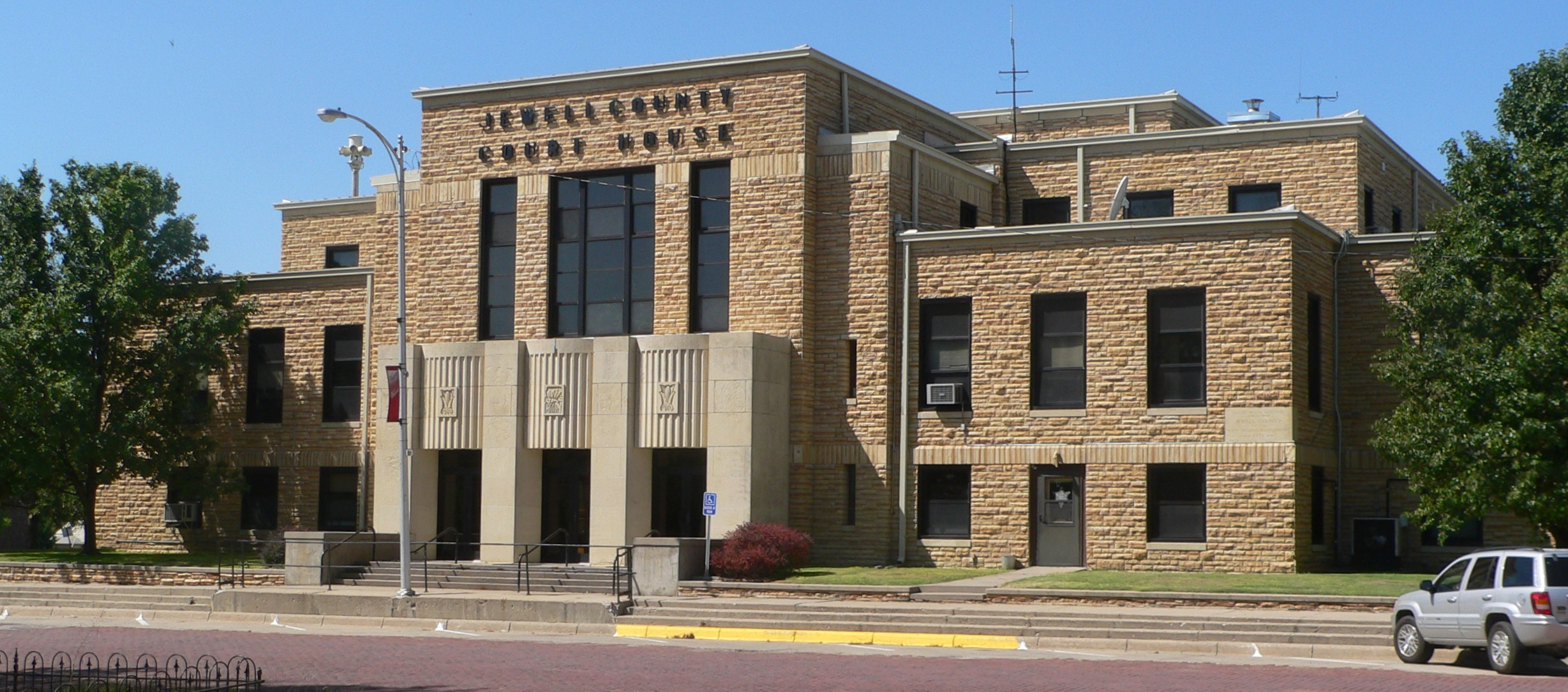
- Jewell County Courthouse in Mankato (2014)

- Location within the U.S. state of Kansas
- Coordinates: 39°48′N 98°14′W
- Country: United States
- State: Kansas
- Founded: February 26, 1887
- Named for: Lewis R. Jewell
- Seat: Mankato
- Largest city: Mankato

Area
  - Total: 914 sq mi (2,370 km^{2})
  - Land: 910 sq mi (2,400 km^{2})
  - Water: 4.6 sq mi (12 km^{2}) 0.5%

Population (2020)
  - Total: 2,932
  - Estimate (2025): 2,830 ▼
  - Density: 3.2/sq mi (1.2/km^{2})
- Time zone: UTC−6 (Central)
  - Summer (DST): UTC−5 (CDT)
- Area code: 785
- Congressional district: 1st
- Website: jewellcountykansas.net

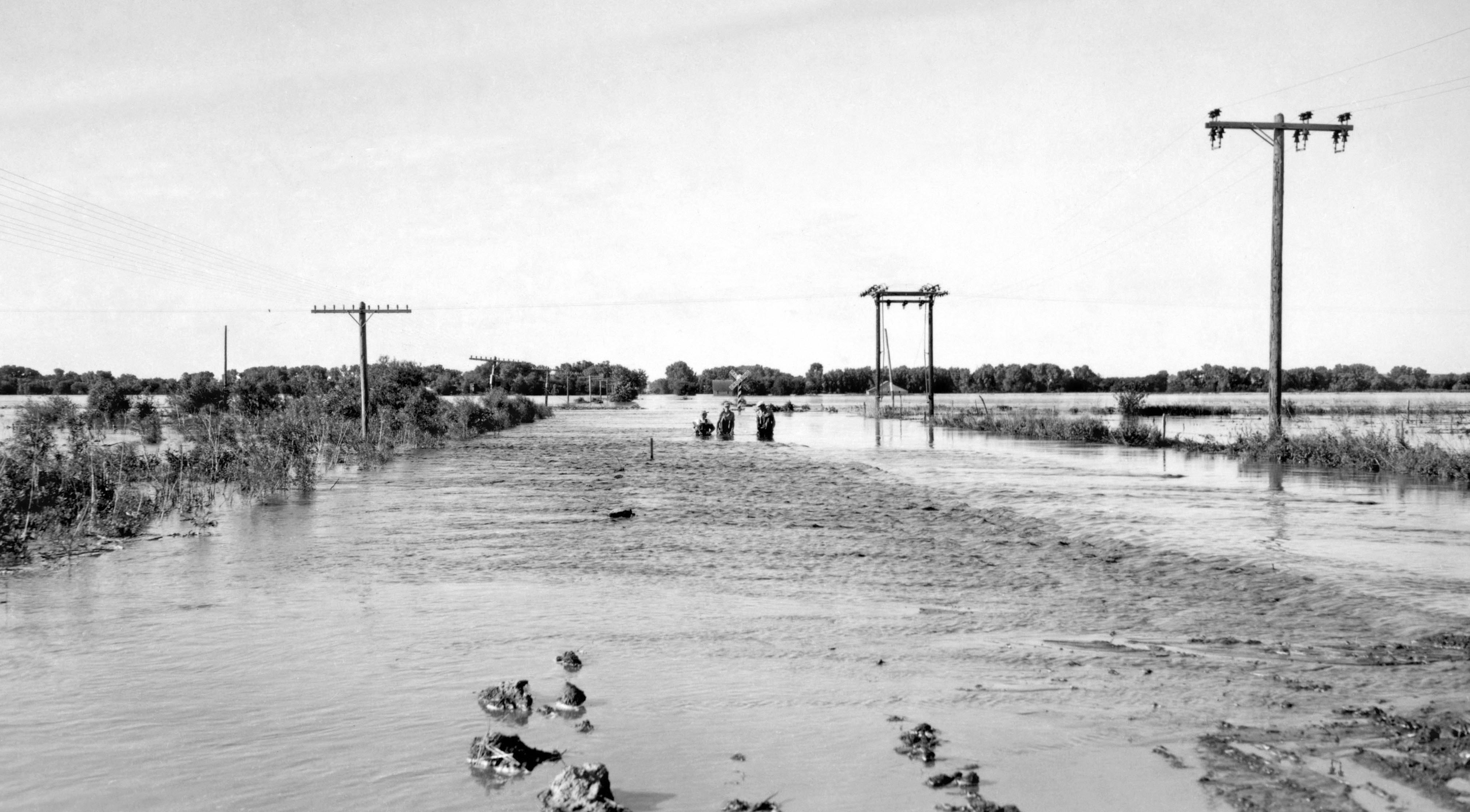
June 24, 1947, flood of the Republican River on the border of Jewell County, Kansas and Republic County, Kansas, near Hardy, Nebraska, and Webber, Kansas, just south of Nebraska NE-8 on Kansas 1 Rd/CR-1 bridge over the Republican River. The normal flood stage for the river is at the tree line in the foreground.

Jewell County is a county located in the U.S. state of Kansas. Its county seat and most populous city is Mankato. As of the 2020 census, the county population was 2,932. The county was named for Lewis Jewell, a lieutenant colonel of the 6th Regiment Kansas Volunteer Cavalry.

== History ==
=== Early history ===
For many millennia, the Great Plains of North America was inhabited by nomadic Native Americans. From the 16th century to 18th century, the Kingdom of France claimed ownership of large parts of North America. In 1762, after the French and Indian War, France secretly ceded New France to Spain, per the Treaty of Fontainebleau.

=== 19th century ===
In 1802, Spain returned most of the land to France, but keeping title to about 7,500 square miles. In 1803, most of the land for modern day Kansas was acquired by the United States from France as part of the 828,000 square mile Louisiana Purchase for 2.83 cents per acre.

In 1854, the Kansas Territory was organized, then in 1861 Kansas became the 34th U.S. state. In 1887, Jewell County was established and named for Lieutenant Colonel Lewis R. Jewell of the 6th Regiment Kansas Volunteer Cavalry who died from wounds received in the Battle of Cane Hill. The county lies on the historic Pawnee road, which was crossed by the Pike Expedition in 1806. The first attempt at settlement was made by William Harshberger and his wife on White Rock Creek in 1862, but they were soon driven out by hostile Indian tribes. Subsequent settlement efforts along White Rock Creek in 1866 and 1867 were again subjected to Cheyenne raids in which many settlers were killed, after which the survivors evacuated the county. The Excelsior colony from New York attempted to settle in 1869 but was driven out by June. Despite these dangers, more settlers arrived later that year and into 1870. The first marriage was recorded in the county in 1871.

In response to the persistent threat of Indian raids, settlers formed the "Buffalo Militia" in May 1870 to protect against an anticipated Cheyenne attack. They constructed a fort at what is now Jewell City, which they held until relieved by the Third U.S. Mounted Artillery the following month. After this, there were no further attacks from hostile tribes. The county's formal organization began with the appointment of county commissioners in July 1870, followed by an election in September to establish county officials and choose Jewell City as the county seat.

In 1887, Atchison, Topeka and Santa Fe Railway built a branch line from Neva (3 miles west of Strong City) to Superior, Nebraska. This branch line connected Strong City, Neva, Rockland, Diamond Springs, Burdick, Lost Springs, Jacobs, Hope, Navarre, Enterprise, Abilene, Talmage, Manchester, Longford, Oak Hill, Miltonvale, Aurora, Huscher, Concordia, Kackley, Courtland, Webber, Superior. At some point, the line from Neva to Lost Springs was pulled but the right of way has not been abandoned. This branch line was originally called "Strong City and Superior line" but later the name was shortened to the "Strong City line". In 1996, the Atchison, Topeka and Santa Fe Railway merged with Burlington Northern Railroad and renamed to the current BNSF Railway. Most locals still refer to this railroad as the "Santa Fe".

== Geography ==
According to the U.S. Census Bureau, the county has a total area of 914 square miles (2,370 km^{2}), of which 910 square miles (2,400 km^{2}) is land and 4.6 square miles (12 km^{2}) (0.5%) is water.

=== Adjacent counties ===
- Nuckolls County, Nebraska (northeast)
- Republic County (east)
- Cloud County (southeast)
- Mitchell County (south)
- Osborne County (southwest)
- Smith County (west)
- Webster County, Nebraska (northwest)

== Demographics ==
Historical population
Census	Pop.	Note	%±
1870	207		—
1880	17,475		8,342.0%
1890	19,349		10.7%
1900	19,420		0.4%
1910	18,148		−6.5%
1920	16,240		−10.5%
1930	14,462		−10.9%
1940	11,970		−17.2%
1950	9,698		−19.0%
1960	7,217		−25.6%
1970	6,099		−15.5%
1980	5,241		−14.1%
1990	4,251		−18.9%
2000	3,791		−10.8%
2010	3,077		−18.8%
2020	2,932		−4.7%
2025 (est.)	2,830	▼	−3.5%
U.S. Decennial Census; 1790-1960 1900-1990; 1990-2000 2010-2020

=== Racial and ethnic composition ===
Jewell County, Kansas – Racial and ethnic composition Note: the US Census treats Hispanic/Latino as an ethnic category. This table excludes Latinos from the racial categories and assigns them to a separate category. Hispanics/Latinos may be of any race.
Race / Ethnicity (NH = Non-Hispanic)	Pop 1980	Pop 1990	Pop 2000	Pop 2010	Pop 2020	% 1980	% 1990	% 2000	% 2010	% 2020
White alone (NH)	5,215	4,227	3,723	2,959	2,743	99.50%	99.44%	98.21%	96.17%	93.55%
Black or African American alone (NH)	4	0	1	4	4	0.08%	0.00%	0.03%	0.13%	0.14%
Native American or Alaska Native alone (NH)	11	12	13	17	10	0.21%	0.28%	0.34%	0.55%	0.34%
Asian alone (NH)	4	4	2	6	10	0.08%	0.09%	0.05%	0.19%	0.34%
Native Hawaiian or Pacific Islander alone (NH)	x	x	1	0	0	x	x	0.03%	0.00%	0.00%
Other race alone (NH)	4	0	0	2	8	0.08%	0.00%	0.00%	0.06%	0.27%
Mixed race or Multiracial (NH)	x	x	24	26	95	x	x	0.63%	0.84%	3.24%
Hispanic or Latino (any race)	3	8	27	63	62	0.06%	0.19%	0.71%	2.05%	2.11%
Total	5,241	4,251	3,791	3,077	2,932	100.00%	100.00%	100.00%	100.00%	100.00%

=== 2020 census ===
As of the 2020 census, the county had a population of 2,932. The median age was 49.9 years, 21.3% of residents were under the age of 18, and 28.4% were 65 years of age or older. For every 100 females there were 106.6 males, and for every 100 females age 18 and over there were 106.2 males age 18 and over. All residents lived in rural areas while 0.0% resided in urban areas.

The racial makeup of the county was 94.0% White, 0.2% Black or African American, 0.4% American Indian and Alaska Native, 0.3% Asian, 0.0% Native Hawaiian and Pacific Islander, 0.6% from some other race, and 4.4% from two or more races. Hispanic or Latino residents of any race comprised 2.1% of the population.

There were 1,346 households in the county, of which 22.7% had children under the age of 18 living with them and 20.2% had a female householder with no spouse or partner present. About 35.2% of all households were made up of individuals and 20.1% had someone living alone who was 65 years of age or older.

There were 1,763 housing units, of which 23.7% were vacant. Among occupied housing units, 79.9% were owner-occupied and 20.1% were renter-occupied. The homeowner vacancy rate was 2.2% and the rental vacancy rate was 12.8%.

=== 2000 census ===
As of the 2000 census, there were 3,791 people, 1,695 households, and 1,098 families residing in the county. The population density was 4 people per square mile (1.5 people/km^{2}). There were 2,103 housing units at an average density of 2 per square mile (0.77/km^{2}). The racial makeup of the county was 98.79% White, 0.34% Native American, 0.05% Asian, 0.03% Black or African American, 0.03% Pacific Islander, 0.05% from other races, and 0.71% from two or more races. Hispanic or Latino of any race were 0.71% of the population.

There were 1,695 households, out of which 23.70% had children under the age of 18 living with them, 58.10% were married couples living together, 4.80% had a female householder with no husband present, and 35.20% were non-families. 32.40% of all households were made up of individuals, and 18.10% had someone living alone who was 65 years of age or older. The average household size was 2.21 and the average family size was 2.80.

In the county, the population was spread out, with 21.90% under the age of 18, 4.40% from 18 to 24, 21.50% from 25 to 44, 26.20% from 45 to 64, and 25.90% who were 65 years of age or older. The median age was 46 years. For every 100 females there were 97.90 males. For every 100 females age 18 and over, there were 96.00 males.

The median income for a household in the county was $30,538, and the median income for a family was $36,953. Males had a median income of $24,821 versus $18,170 for females. The per capita income for the county was $16,644. About 8.40% of families and 11.60% of the population were below the poverty line, including 12.80% of those under age 18 and 10.90% of those age 65 or over.

== Government ==
=== Presidential elections ===
Presidential election results

United States presidential election results for Jewell County, Kansas
Year	Republican		Democratic		Third party(ies)	
Year	No.	%	No.	%	No.	%
1888	2,285	54.81%	999	23.96%	885	21.23%
1892	1,963	45.59%	0	0.00%	2,343	54.41%
1896	1,902	44.41%	2,342	54.68%	39	0.91%
1900	2,448	51.96%	2,192	46.53%	71	1.51%
1904	2,720	68.09%	927	23.20%	348	8.71%
1908	2,410	53.48%	1,932	42.88%	164	3.64%
1912	906	20.51%	1,871	42.36%	1,640	37.13%
1916	3,022	39.84%	4,180	55.11%	383	5.05%
1920	3,925	65.97%	1,899	31.92%	126	2.12%
1924	4,342	64.83%	1,861	27.78%	495	7.39%
1928	4,583	76.90%	1,289	21.63%	88	1.48%
1932	3,324	48.20%	3,367	48.83%	205	2.97%
1936	3,849	57.76%	2,780	41.72%	35	0.53%
1940	4,591	71.57%	1,719	26.80%	105	1.64%
1944	3,754	74.20%	1,216	24.04%	89	1.76%
1948	3,143	63.18%	1,574	31.64%	258	5.19%
1952	4,162	80.86%	885	17.19%	100	1.94%
1956	3,395	75.51%	1,034	23.00%	67	1.49%
1960	2,914	72.25%	1,095	27.15%	24	0.60%
1964	1,895	53.61%	1,601	45.29%	39	1.10%
1968	2,172	66.18%	842	25.66%	268	8.17%
1972	2,242	74.04%	716	23.65%	70	2.31%
1976	1,592	57.47%	1,111	40.11%	67	2.42%
1980	2,074	72.80%	578	20.29%	197	6.91%
1984	1,992	76.50%	583	22.39%	29	1.11%
1988	1,546	67.99%	684	30.08%	44	1.93%
1992	1,050	45.65%	546	23.74%	704	30.61%
1996	1,374	69.01%	417	20.94%	200	10.05%
2000	1,400	74.59%	380	20.25%	97	5.17%
2004	1,495	78.07%	385	20.10%	35	1.83%
2008	1,231	77.71%	313	19.76%	40	2.53%
2012	1,235	82.50%	229	15.30%	33	2.20%
2016	1,223	81.86%	180	12.05%	91	6.09%
2020	1,387	85.20%	212	13.02%	29	1.78%
2024	1,370	87.04%	176	11.18%	28	1.78%

Like all of Kansas outside the eastern cities, Jewell County is overwhelmingly Republican. The only Democratic presidential candidates to win a majority in the county have been Woodrow Wilson in 1916 and William Jennings Bryan in 1896, and the last Democrat to win a plurality was Franklin D. Roosevelt in 1932. Since 1940 only Lyndon Johnson in 1964 and Jimmy Carter in 1976 have exceeded 31 percent of the county's vote, a devotion to the GOP comparable to famous Appalachia Unionist strongholds like Avery County, North Carolina, or Grant County, West Virginia.

=== Laws ===
Although the Kansas Constitution was amended in 1986 to allow the sale of alcoholic liquor by the individual drink with the approval of voters, Jewell County restaurants serve only 3.2 beer and no hard alcohol.

== Education ==
=== Unified school districts ===
- Rock Hills USD 107

== Communities ==
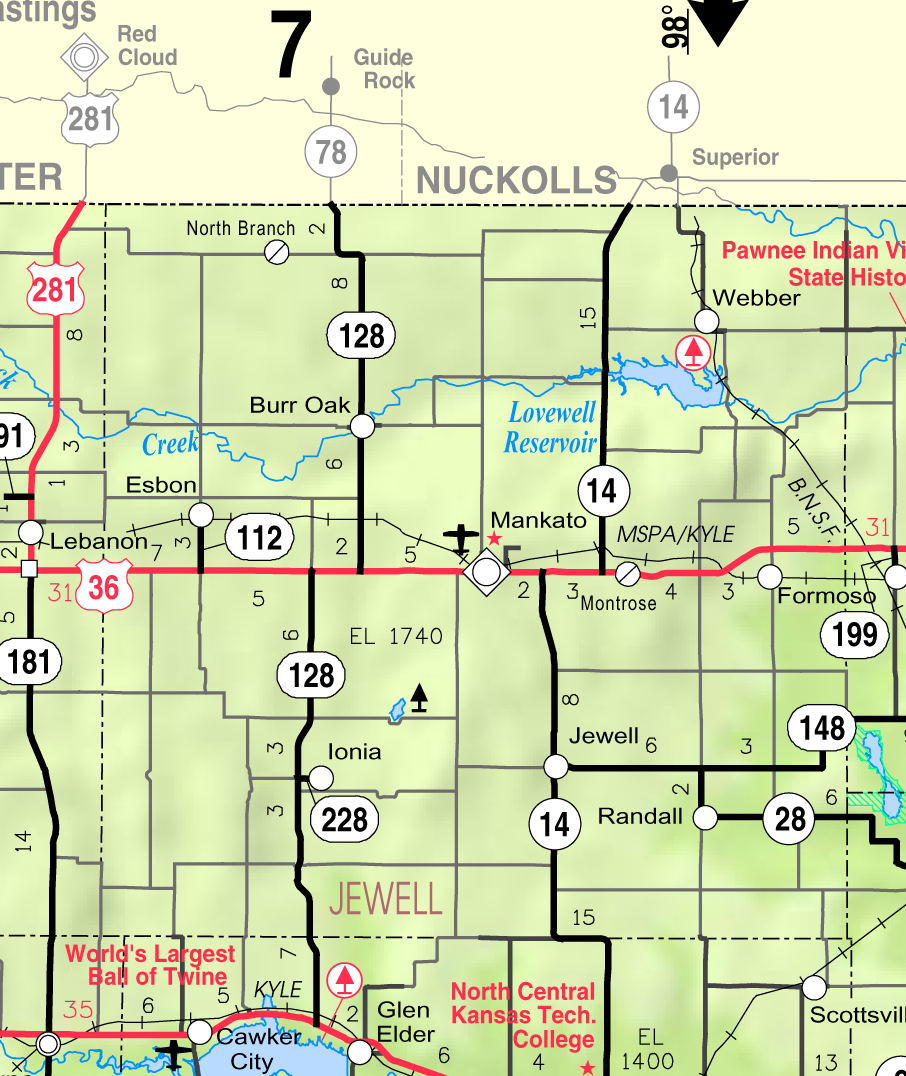
2005 map of Jewell County (map legend)

List of townships / incorporated cities / unincorporated communities / extinct former communities within Jewell County.

=== Cities ===
- Burr Oak
- Esbon
- Formoso
- Jewell
- Mankato (county seat)
- Randall
- Webber

=== Unincorporated communities ===
† means a community is designated a Census-Designated Place (CDP) by the United States Census Bureau.

- Ionia†
- Lovewell
- Montrose
- North Branch
- Otego

=== Ghost towns ===
- Dentonia
- Salem

=== Townships ===
Jewell County is divided into twenty-five townships. None of the cities within the county are considered governmentally independent, and all figures for the townships include those of the cities. In the following table, the population center is the largest city (or cities) included in that township's population total, if it is of a significant size.

Township	FIPS	Population center	Population	Population density /km^{2} (/sq mi)	Land area km^{2} (sq mi)	Water area km^{2} (sq mi)	Water %	Geographic coordinates
Allen	01225		43	0 (1)	90 (35)	0 (0)	0.02%	39°36′46″N 97°59′49″W
Athens	02975		74	1 (2)	102 (39)	0 (0)	0%	39°36′13″N 98°20′7″W
Browns Creek	08725		64	1 (2)	93 (36)	0 (0)	0.02%	39°36′13″N 98°13′33″W
Buffalo	09125		574	5 (14)	105 (41)	0 (0)	0.07%	39°40′23″N 98°8′38″W
Burr Oak	09550		338	3 (9)	102 (39)	0 (0)	0%	39°52′9″N 98°18′36″W
Calvin	10075		65	1 (2)	81 (31)	0 (0)	0.04%	39°42′19″N 98°12′51″W
Center	11750		1,100	12 (31)	93 (36)	0 (0)	0.07%	39°47′15″N 98°12′38″W
Erving	21575		60	1 (2)	93 (36)	0 (0)	0.08%	39°36′13″N 98°26′21″W
Esbon	21625		222	2 (6)	93 (36)	0 (0)	0.08%	39°48′15″N 98°26′41″W
Grant	27725		220	2 (6)	93 (36)	0 (0)	0%	39°46′58″N 97°59′28″W
Harrison	30350		52	1 (1)	93 (36)	0 (0)	0%	39°57′58″N 98°13′19″W
Highland	31900		49	1 (1)	93 (36)	0 (0)	0.03%	39°57′49″N 98°26′42″W
Holmwood	32800		49	1 (1)	92 (36)	0 (0)	0.05%	39°51′43″N 98°12′24″W
Ionia	34375		100	1 (3)	102 (39)	0 (0)	0.11%	39°40′55″N 98°19′55″W
Jackson	34800		123	1 (3)	92 (35)	1 (0)	0.90%	39°56′52″N 97°59′53″W
Limestone	40450		49	0 (1)	102 (39)	0 (0)	0.02%	39°47′38″N 98°18′45″W
Montana	47800		93	1 (3)	94 (36)	0 (0)	0.14%	39°57′55″N 98°5′21″W
Odessa	52125		34	0 (1)	93 (36)	0 (0)	0.02%	39°41′52″N 98°27′29″W
Prairie	57400		172	2 (5)	96 (37)	0 (0)	0.02%	39°37′40″N 98°4′12″W
Richland	59375		36	0 (1)	83 (32)	9 (4)	10.13%	39°53′41″N 98°5′40″W
Sinclair	65675		67	1 (2)	89 (34)	3 (1)	2.81%	39°52′41″N 97°59′52″W
Vicksburg	73725		28	0 (1)	93 (36)	0 (0)	0%	39°42′4″N 97°58′45″W
Walnut	75000		80	1 (2)	102 (39)	0 (0)	0.07%	39°57′58″N 98°20′12″W
Washington	75650		50	1 (1)	93 (36)	0 (0)	0%	39°47′3″N 98°5′36″W
White Mound	77925		49	1 (1)	93 (36)	0 (0)	0.12%	39°51′53″N 98°26′21″W
Sources: "Census 2000 U.S. Gazetteer Files". U.S. Census Bureau, Geography Division. Archived from the original on August 2, 2002.

== See also ==
- Dry counties

Community information for Kansas

- Kansas locations by per capita income
- List of counties in Kansas
- List of townships in Kansas
- List of cities in Kansas
- List of unincorporated communities in Kansas
- List of ghost towns in Kansas
