= Mankato, Kansas =

City in Jewell County, Kansas

- City and County seat
- Location within Jewell County and Kansas

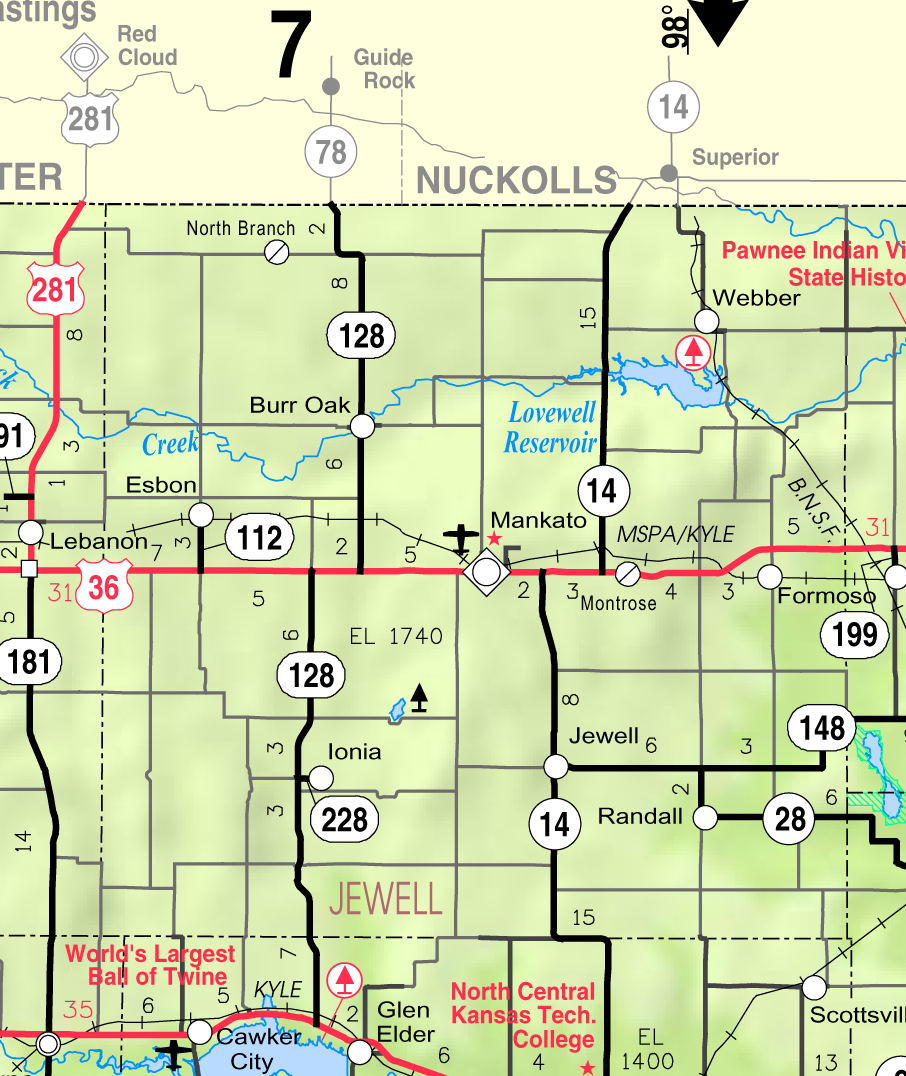
- KDOT map of Jewell County (legend)
- Coordinates: 39°47′13″N 98°12′30″W
- Country: United States
- State: Kansas
- County: Jewell
- Founded: 1870s
- Platted: 1872
- Incorporated: 1880
- Named for: Mankato, Minnesota

Area
  - Total: 0.98 sq mi (2.53 km^{2})
  - Land: 0.98 sq mi (2.53 km^{2})
  - Water: 0 sq mi (0.00 km^{2})
- Elevation: 1,765 ft (538 m)

Population (2020)
  - Total: 836
  - Density: 856/sq mi (330/km^{2})
- Time zone: UTC-6 (CST)
  - Summer (DST): UTC-5 (CDT)
- ZIP Code: 66956
- Area code: 785
- FIPS code: 20-44300
- GNIS ID: 2395832
- Website: City website

Mankato is a city in and the county seat of Jewell County, Kansas, United States. As of the 2020 census, the population of the city was 836.

== History ==
Mankato was originally called Jewell Center, and under the latter name laid out in 1872. It was renamed Mankato in 1880 after Mankato, Minnesota. Mankato was incorporated as a city in 1880.

The first post office in the town was established as Jewell Center in August 1872. The post office was renamed Mankato in April 1880.

== Geography ==
According to the United States Census Bureau, the city has a total area of 1.01 square miles (2.62 km^{2}), all land.

=== Climate ===
According to the Köppen Climate Classification system, Mankato has a hot-summer humid continental climate, abbreviated "Dfa" on climate maps. The hottest temperature recorded in Mankato was 111 °F (43.9 °C) on July 5, 1964, while the coldest temperature recorded was −25 °F (−31.7 °C) on January 10, 1982.

Climate data for Mankato, Kansas, 1991–2020 normals, extremes 1893–2005
Month	Jan	Feb	Mar	Apr	May	Jun	Jul	Aug	Sep	Oct	Nov	Dec	Year
Record high °F (°C)	77 (25)	80 (27)	89 (32)	99 (37)	100 (38)	108 (42)	111 (44)	110 (43)	108 (42)	96 (36)	84 (29)	78 (26)	111 (44)
Mean daily maximum °F (°C)	37.1 (2.8)	41.8 (5.4)	53.0 (11.7)	63.3 (17.4)	73.4 (23.0)	84.7 (29.3)	90.5 (32.5)	87.8 (31.0)	79.3 (26.3)	67.2 (19.6)	52.7 (11.5)	39.9 (4.4)	64.2 (17.9)
Daily mean °F (°C)	25.7 (−3.5)	29.6 (−1.3)	39.8 (4.3)	50.0 (10.0)	60.7 (15.9)	72.4 (22.4)	78.2 (25.7)	75.3 (24.1)	66.0 (18.9)	53.8 (12.1)	39.9 (4.4)	29.1 (−1.6)	51.7 (11.0)
Mean daily minimum °F (°C)	14.2 (−9.9)	17.5 (−8.1)	26.7 (−2.9)	36.7 (2.6)	48.0 (8.9)	60.0 (15.6)	65.9 (18.8)	62.7 (17.1)	52.7 (11.5)	40.5 (4.7)	27.0 (−2.8)	18.3 (−7.6)	39.2 (4.0)
Record low °F (°C)	−25 (−32)	−19 (−28)	−13 (−25)	11 (−12)	19 (−7)	37 (3)	42 (6)	42 (6)	22 (−6)	10 (−12)	−5 (−21)	−23 (−31)	−25 (−32)
Average precipitation inches (mm)	0.78 (20)	0.91 (23)	1.63 (41)	2.60 (66)	4.24 (108)	3.78 (96)	4.17 (106)	3.55 (90)	2.38 (60)	1.98 (50)	1.30 (33)	0.96 (24)	28.28 (717)
Average snowfall inches (cm)	5.0 (13)	7.7 (20)	3.5 (8.9)	1.0 (2.5)	0.0 (0.0)	0.0 (0.0)	0.0 (0.0)	0.0 (0.0)	0.0 (0.0)	0.4 (1.0)	2.0 (5.1)	5.4 (14)	25.0 (64)
Average precipitation days (≥ 0.01 in)	3.6	3.5	5.7	7.4	9.8	8.3	7.8	7.6	6.3	5.3	4.1	3.8	73.2
Average snowy days (≥ 0.1 in)	2.4	2.4	1.4	0.4	0.0	0.0	0.0	0.0	0.0	0.1	0.8	2.2	9.7
Source 1: NOAA
Source 2: National Weather Service

== Demographics ==
Historical population
Census	Pop.	Note	%±
1880	506		—
1890	800		58.1%
1900	890		11.3%
1910	1,155		29.8%
1920	1,326		14.8%
1930	1,404		5.9%
1940	1,426		1.6%
1950	1,462		2.5%
1960	1,231		−15.8%
1970	1,287		4.5%
1980	1,205		−6.4%
1990	1,037		−13.9%
2000	976		−5.9%
2010	869		−11.0%
2020	836		−3.8%
U.S. Decennial Census

=== 2020 census ===
The 2020 United States census counted 836 people, 404 households, and 217 families in Mankato. The population density was 857.4 per square mile (331.1/km^{2}). There were 479 housing units at an average density of 491.3 per square mile (189.7/km^{2}). The racial makeup was 92.22% (771) white or European American (91.51% non-Hispanic white), 0.24% (2) black or African-American, 0.84% (7) Native American or Alaska Native, 0.72% (6) Asian, 0.0% (0) Pacific Islander or Native Hawaiian, 0.84% (7) from other races, and 5.14% (43) from two or more races. Hispanic or Latino of any race was 2.63% (22) of the population.

Of the 404 households, 22.0% had children under the age of 18; 43.1% were married couples living together; 27.0% had a female householder with no spouse or partner present. 41.8% of households consisted of individuals and 24.8% had someone living alone who was 65 years of age or older. The average household size was 2.1 and the average family size was 2.8. The percent of those with a bachelor's degree or higher was estimated to be 18.1% of the population.

20.5% of the population was under the age of 18, 5.5% from 18 to 24, 18.5% from 25 to 44, 27.4% from 45 to 64, and 28.1% who were 65 years of age or older. The median age was 50.0 years. For every 100 females, there were 100.5 males. For every 100 females ages 18 and older, there were 105.2 males.

The 2016–2020 5-year American Community Survey estimates show that the median household income was $35,455 (with a margin of error of +/- $13,171) and the median family income was $63,594 (+/- $16,067). Males had a median income of $29,375 (+/- $6,498) versus $16,339 (+/- $4,210) for females. The median income for those above 16 years old was $22,111 (+/- $3,473). Approximately, 4.2% of families and 6.9% of the population were below the poverty line, including 3.5% of those under the age of 18 and 8.4% of those ages 65 or over.

=== 2010 census ===
At the 2010 census there were 869 people in 405 households, including 242 families, in the city. The population density was 860.4 inhabitants per square mile (332.2/km^{2}). There were 486 housing units at an average density of 481.2 per square mile (185.8/km^{2}). The racial makeup of the city was 97.0% White, 0.3% African American, 0.3% Native American, 0.5% Asian, 0.5% from other races, and 1.4% from two or more races. Hispanic or Latino of any race were 1.0%.

Of the 405 households 22.0% had children under the age of 18 living with them, 50.9% were married couples living together, 6.4% had a female householder with no husband present, 2.5% had a male householder with no wife present, and 40.2% were non-families. 37.5% of households were one person and 18.8% were one person aged 65 or older. The average household size was 2.08 and the average family size was 2.71.

The median age was 51.5 years. 19.2% of residents were under the age of 18; 5% were between the ages of 18 and 24; 17.1% were from 25 to 44; 30.4% were from 45 to 64; and 28.3% were 65 or older. The gender makeup of the city was 48.2% male and 51.8% female.

== Education ==
The community is served by Rock Hills USD 107 public school district. The Rock Hills High School mascot is Grizzlies.

Prior to school unification, Mankato was home to Mankato High School with the mascot Cougars. The Mankato Cougars won the Kansas State High School boys class B basketball championship in 1943.

== Notable people ==
- Gregg Doud, Chief Agricultural Negotiator, Rank of Ambassador, in the Office of the United States Trade Representative, being confirmed March 1, 2018.
- Wint Smith (1892–1976) Congressman, represented Kansas from 1947 to 1961.
- Ernest Tippin (1890–1958) Olympic sharpshooter.
