= Highland Township, Lincoln County, Kansas =

Township in Lincoln County, Kansas, U.S.

Highland Township
- Township
- Location in Lincoln County
- Coordinates: 38.907481°N 98.420424°W
- Country: United States
- State: Kansas
- County: Lincoln

Area
  - Total: 35.749 sq mi (92.59 km^{2})
  - Land: 35.528 sq mi (92.02 km^{2})
  - Water: 0.221 sq mi (0.57 km^{2}) 0.62%

Population (2020)
  - Total: 60
  - Density: 1.7/sq mi (0.65/km^{2})
- Time zone: UTC-6 (CST)
  - Summer (DST): UTC-5 (CDT)
- Area code: 785

Highland Township is a township in Lincoln County, Kansas, United States. As of the 2020 census, its population was 60.

== Geography ==
Highland Township covers an area of 35.749 square miles (92.59 square kilometers). Part of Wilson Lake is located within the township.

=== Adjacent townships ===
- Pleasant Township, Lincoln County (north)
- Vesper Township, Lincoln County (northeast)
- Golden Belt Township, Lincoln County (east)
- Columbia Township, Ellsworth County (southeast)
- Wilson Township, Ellsworth County (south)
- Plymouth Township, Russell County (west)
- Fairview Township, Russell County (northwest)

=== Major highways ===
- K-181
- K-232
