= Plymouth Township, Kansas =

Township in Russell County, Kansas, U.S.

Plymouth Township
- Township
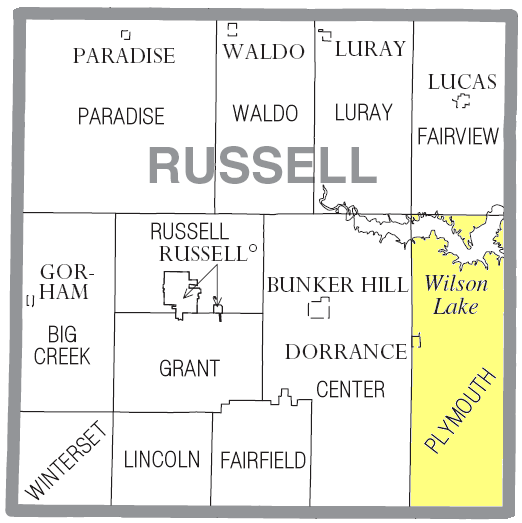
- Location of Plymouth Township in Russell County
- Coordinates: 38°49′38″N 98°32′22″W
- Country: United States
- State: Kansas
- County: Russell

Government
  - District 5 County Commissioner: Alan Kuntzsch

Area
  - Total: 107.44 sq mi (278.3 km^{2})
  - Land: 98.30 sq mi (254.6 km^{2})
  - Water: 9.14 sq mi (23.7 km^{2}) 8.5%
- Elevation: 1,683 ft (513 m)

Population (2020)
  - Total: 214
  - Density: 2.18/sq mi (0.841/km^{2})
- Time zone: UTC-6 (Central (CST))
  - Summer (DST): UTC-5 (CDT)
- ZIP Code: 67490, 67525, 67634, 67648
- Area code: 785
- GNIS feature ID: 475235

Plymouth Township is a township in Russell County, Kansas, United States. As of the 2020 United States census, it had a population of 214.

== Geography ==
The center of Plymouth Township is located at 38°49′38″N 98°32′22″W (39.8272331, −98.5395133) at an elevation of 1,683 feet (513 m). The township lies in the Smoky Hills region of the Great Plains. The eastern two-thirds of Wilson Lake lies in the northern part of the township. The Smoky Hill River flows windingly east through the township's center, fed by Coal Creek, one of its tributaries, which runs north-northeast through the southern half of the township. Another of the river's tributaries, Blood Creek, flows northeast through the extreme southeastern corner of the township.

According to the United States Census Bureau, Plymouth Township occupies an area of 107.44 square miles (278.3 km^{2}) of which 98.30 square miles (254.6 km^{2}) is land and 9.14 square miles (23.7 km^{2}) is water. Comprising east-central and southeastern Russell County, it includes the city of Dorrance, which is located in the west-central part of the township, and it borders Fairview Township to the north, Lincoln County's Pleasant Township to the northeast, Lincoln County's Highland Township and Ellsworth County's Wilson and Noble Townships to the east, Barton County's Cleveland and Beaver Townships to the south, Center Township to the west, and Luray Township to the northwest.

== Demographics ==
Historical population
| Census | Pop. | Note | %± |
|---|---|---|---|
| 1880 | 1,073 | | — |
| 1890 | 1,096 | | 2.1% |
| 1900 | 1,134 | | 3.5% |
| 1910 | 1,116 | | −1.6% |
| 1920 | 1,131 | | 1.3% |
| 1930 | 1,016 | | −10.2% |
| 1940 | 1,000 | | −1.6% |
| 1950 | 795 | | −20.5% |
| 1960 | 604 | | −24.0% |
| 1970 | 430 | | −28.8% |
| 1980 | 373 | | −13.3% |
| 1990 | 316 | | −15.3% |
| 2000 | 319 | | 0.9% |
| 2010 | 280 | | −12.2% |
| 2020 | 214 | | −23.6% |
U.S. Decennial Census

As of the 2020 census, there were 214 people and 109 households residing in the township. The population density was 0.814 people per square mile (0.314 people/km^{2}). There were 183 housing units. The racial makeup of the township was 93.0% White, 0.9% Asian, 1.4% from some other race, and 4.7% from two or more races. Hispanics or Latinos of any race were 0.5% of the population.

There were 109 households: 67.9% were married couples living together, 17.4% had a male householder with no wife present, and 11.0% had a female householder with no husband present. The average family size was 2.05.

In the township, the population was spread out, with 6.1% under the age of 19, 2.3% from 20 to 24, 10.7% from 25 to 44, 25.7% from 45 to 64, and 48.6% who were 65 years of age or older. The median age was 65.8 years. For every 100 females, there were 141.0 males. For every 100 females age 18 and over, there were 149.3 males age 18 and over.

== Education ==
Plymouth Township lies within Central Plains USD 112, based in Lorraine. Local public school students attend school in nearby Wilson.

== Transportation ==
Interstate 70 and U.S. Route 40 run concurrently east–west through the central part of the township. The former alignment of U.S. 40, now a paved county road, runs southeast–northwest through the township, south of I-70/U.S. 40. K-232, a north–south route, enters the northeastern part of the township from the north and runs south along the eastern shore of Wilson Lake before turning slightly southeastward and exiting the county. A network of mostly unpaved county roads is laid out in a rough grid pattern across the township. Shoreline Road, a paved county road, runs roughly parallel to the southern shoreline of Wilson Lake, terminating at its junction with K-232. Another paved road, 200th Boulevard, enters the township from the west 3.5 miles south of Dorrance, turns north, and runs north through Dorrance before finally terminating at the southern shore of Wilson Lake.

The Kansas Pacific (KP) line of the Union Pacific Railroad runs southeast–northwest through the township, parallel to the old alignment of U.S. 40.
