= Franklin Township, Lincoln County, Kansas =

Township in Lincoln County, Kansas, U.S.

Franklin Township
- Township
- Location in Lincoln County
- Coordinates: 38.893346°N 98.09131°W
- Country: United States
- State: Kansas
- County: Lincoln

Area
  - Total: 36.043 sq mi (93.35 km^{2})
  - Land: 35.98 sq mi (93.2 km^{2})
  - Water: 0.063 sq mi (0.16 km^{2}) 0.17%

Population (2020)
  - Total: 70
  - Density: 1.9/sq mi (0.75/km^{2})
- Time zone: UTC-6 (CST)
  - Summer (DST): UTC-5 (CDT)
- Area code: 785

Franklin Township is a township in Lincoln County, Kansas, United States. As of the 2020 census, its population was 70.

== Geography ==
Franklin Township covers an area of 36.043 square miles (93.35 square kilometers).

=== Adjacent townships ===
- Elkhorn Township, Lincoln County (north)
- Colorado Township, Lincoln County (northeast)
- Madison Township, Lincoln County (east)
- Mulberry Township, Ellsworth County (southeast)
- Garfield Township, Ellsworth County (south)
- Sherman Township, Ellsworth County (southwest)
- Valley Township, Lincoln County (west)
- Indiana Township, Lincoln County (northwest)

=== Major highways ===
- I-70
- K-14
