= Valley Township, Lincoln County, Kansas =

Township in Lincoln County, Kansas, U.S.

Valley Township
- Township
- Location in Lincoln County
- Coordinates: 38.908208°N 98.214947°W
- Country: United States
- State: Kansas
- County: Lincoln

Area
  - Total: 35.947 sq mi (93.10 km^{2})
  - Land: 35.854 sq mi (92.86 km^{2})
  - Water: 0.093 sq mi (0.24 km^{2}) 0.26%

Population (2020)
  - Total: 43
  - Density: 1.2/sq mi (0.46/km^{2})
- Time zone: UTC-6 (CST)
  - Summer (DST): UTC-5 (CDT)
- Area code: 785

Valley Township is a township in Lincoln County, Kansas, United States. As of the 2020 census, its population was 43.

== Geography ==
Valley Township covers an area of 35.947 square miles (93.10 square kilometers).

=== Adjacent townships ===
- Indiana Township, Lincoln County (north)
- Elkhorn Township, Lincoln County (northeast)
- Franklin Township, Lincoln County (east)
- Garfield Township, Ellsworth County (southeast)
- Sherman Township, Ellsworth County (south)
- Columbia Township, Ellsworth County (southwest)
- Golden Belt Township, Lincoln County (west)
- Vesper Township, Lincoln County (northwest)

=== Major highways ===
- K-14
