= Golden Belt Township, Kansas =

Township in Lincoln County, Kansas, U.S.

Golden Belt Township
- Township
- Location in Lincoln County
- Coordinates: 38.922488°N 98.30564°W
- Country: United States
- State: Kansas
- County: Lincoln

Area
  - Total: 36.157 sq mi (93.65 km^{2})
  - Land: 36.13 sq mi (93.6 km^{2})
  - Water: 0.027 sq mi (0.070 km^{2}) 0.07%

Population (2020)
  - Total: 67
  - Density: 1.9/sq mi (0.72/km^{2})
- Time zone: UTC-6 (CST)
  - Summer (DST): UTC-5 (CDT)
- Area code: 785

Golden Belt Township is a township in Lincoln County, Kansas, United States. As of the 2020 census, its population was 67.

== Geography ==
Golden Belt Township covers an area of 36.157 square miles (93.65 square kilometers).

=== Adjacent townships ===
- Vesper Township, Lincoln County (north)
- Indiana Township, Lincoln County (northeast)
- Valley Township, Lincoln County (east)
- Sherman Township, Ellsworth County (southeast)
- Columbia Township, Ellsworth County (south)
- Wilson Township, Ellsworth County (southwest)
- Highland Township, Lincoln County (west)
- Pleasant Township, Lincoln County (northwest)
