= Madison Township, Lincoln County, Kansas =

Township in Lincoln County, Kansas, U.S.

Madison Township
- Township
- Location in Lincoln County
- Coordinates: 38.919692°N 97.97547°W
- Country: United States
- State: Kansas
- County: Lincoln

Area
  - Total: 36.007 sq mi (93.26 km^{2})
  - Land: 35.882 sq mi (92.93 km^{2})
  - Water: 0.125 sq mi (0.32 km^{2}) 0.35%

Population (2020)
  - Total: 81
  - Density: 2.3/sq mi (0.87/km^{2})
- Time zone: UTC-6 (CST)
  - Summer (DST): UTC-5 (CDT)
- Area code: 785

Madison Township is a township in Lincoln County, Kansas, United States. As of the 2020 census, its population was 81.

== Geography ==
Madison Township covers an area of 36.007 square miles (93.26 square kilometers).

=== Communities ===
- Westfall

=== Adjacent townships ===
- Colorado Township, Lincoln County (north)
- Morton Township, Ottawa County (northeast)
- Glendale Township, Saline County (east)
- Spring Creek Township, Saline County (southeast)
- Mulberry Township, Ellsworth County (south)
- Garfield Township, Ellsworth County (southwest)
- Franklin Township, Lincoln County (west)
- Elkhorn Township, Lincoln County (northwest)

=== Major highways ===
- I-70
