= Midland Hotel (Wilson, Kansas) =

- U.S. National Register of Historic Places
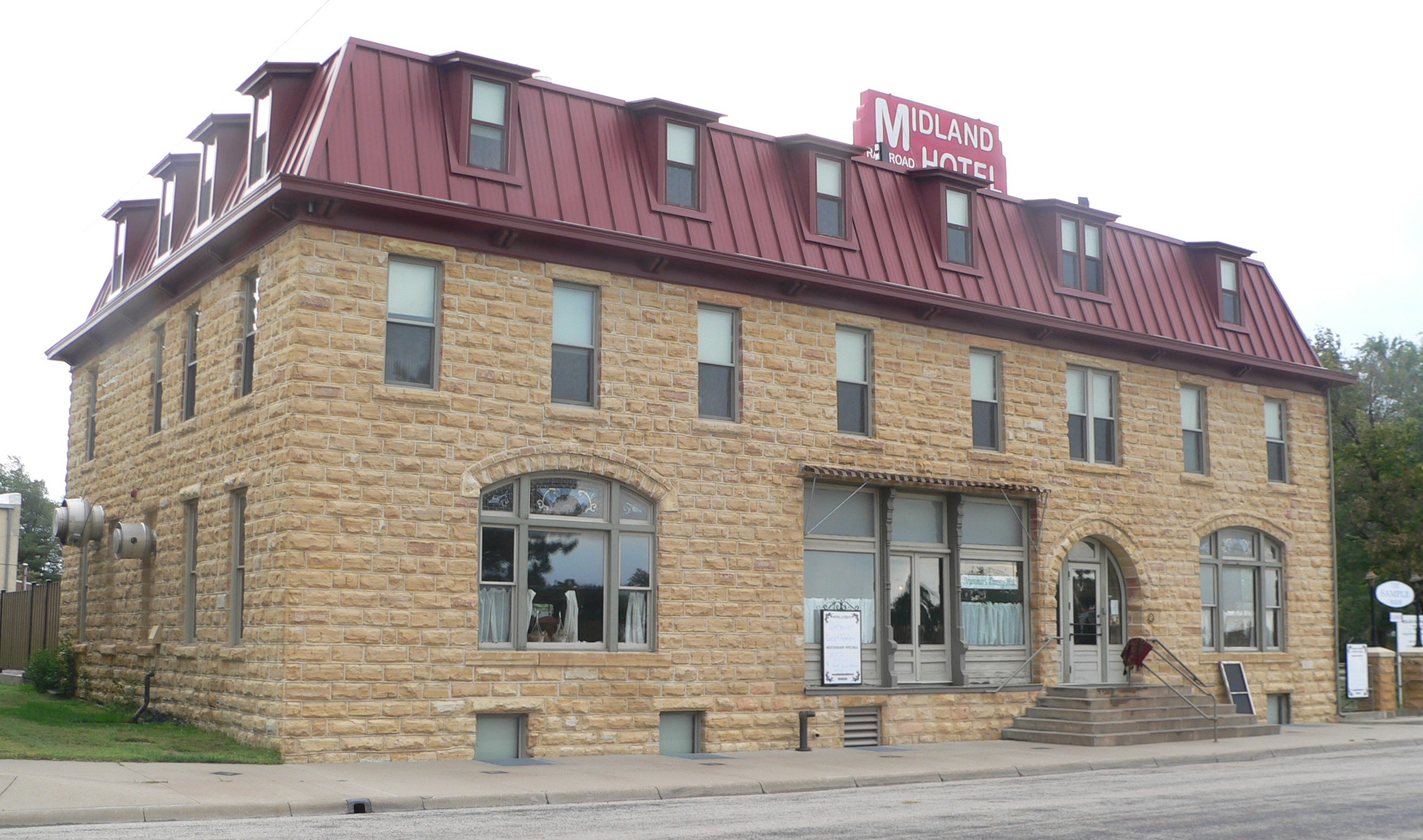

- Location within Kansas
- Location: 414 26th Ave., Wilson, Kansas
- Coordinates: 38°49′32″N 98°28′23″W
- Area: less than one acre
- Built: 1899
- Architectural style: Late Victorian
- NRHP reference No.: 02000716
- Added to NRHP: July 3, 2002

The Midland Hotel, or Midland Railroad Hotel, at 414 26th St. in Wilson, Kansas, was built in 1899. It was listed on the National Register of Historic Places in 2002.

It was opened as the Power Hotel in 1899. It is a three-story native limestone building. It has a mansard roof, which is perhaps a nod to the Second Empire style which was popular during 1855–1885; the third floor is entirely within a straight angled mansard roof profile.
