= Fairview Township, Russell County, Kansas =

Township in Russell County, Kansas, U.S.

Fairview Township
- Township
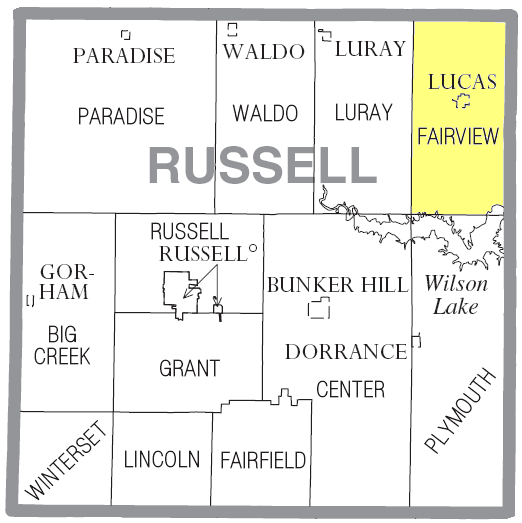
- Location of Fairview Township in Russell County
- Coordinates: 39°03′00″N 98°32′21″W
- Country: United States
- State: Kansas
- County: Russell

Government
  - District 3 County Commissioner: John W. Strobel

Area
  - Total: 71.83 sq mi (186.0 km^{2})
  - Land: 71.28 sq mi (184.6 km^{2})
  - Water: 0.55 sq mi (1.4 km^{2}) 0.77%
- Elevation: 1,480 ft (451 m)

Population (2020)
  - Total: 416
  - Density: 5.84/sq mi (2.25/km^{2})
- Time zone: UTC-6 (Central (CST))
  - Summer (DST): UTC-5 (CDT)
- ZIP Code: 67648
- Area code: 785
- GNIS feature ID: 472473

Fairview Township is a township in Russell County, Kansas, United States. As of the 2020 United States census, it had a population of 416.

== History ==
Waldo Township was organized from part of Fairview Township in 1904. Luray Township was organized from part of Fairview Township in 1906.

== Geography ==
The center of Fairview Township is located at 39°03′00″N 98°32′11″W (39.0500109, −98.5392339) at an elevation of 1,480 feet (450 m). The township lies in the Smoky Hills region of the Great Plains. Wilson Dam and the extreme eastern end of Wilson Lake lie in the southeastern corner of the township. The Saline River flows northeast out of the county from the dam. One of the river's tributaries, Wolf Creek, runs east-southeast through the township's midsection, fed by its East Fork which flows south through the north-central part of the township. A second tributary of Wolf Creek, Blue Stem Creek, flows north then east from its source in the southwestern part of the township.

According to the United States Census Bureau, Fairview Township occupies an area of 71.83 square miles (186.0 km^{2}) of which 71.28 square miles (184.6 km^{2}) is land and 0.55 square miles (1.4 km^{2}) is water. Located in northeastern Russell County, it includes the city of Lucas, which is located in the central part of the township, and it borders Osborne County's Delhi Township and Lincoln County's Cedron Township to the north, Lincoln County's Hanover and Pleasant Townships to the east, Lincoln County's Highland Township to the southeast, Plymouth Township to the south, Center Township to the southwest, and Luray Township to the west.

== Demographics ==
Historical population
Census	Pop.	Note	%±
1880	1,228		—
1890	1,563		27.3%
1900	2,024		29.5%
1910	1,110		−45.2%
1920	1,210		9.0%
1930	1,132		−6.4%
1940	1,011		−10.7%
1950	944		−6.6%
1960	775		−17.9%
1970	689		−11.1%
1980	660		−4.2%
1990	576		−12.7%
2000	526		−8.7%
2010	466		−11.4%
2020	416		−10.7%
U.S. Decennial Census

As of the 2020 census, there were 416 people and 262 households residing in the township. The population density was 5.84 people per square mile (2.25 people/km^{2}). There were 346 housing units. The racial makeup of the township was 92.1% White, 0.2% Asian, 1.9% from some other race, and 5.8% from two or more races. Hispanics or Latinos of any race were 3.6% of the population.

There were 262 households: 51.5% were married couples living together, 26.0% had a male householder with no wife present, and 11.1% had a female householder with no husband present. The average household size was 2.38.

In the township, the population was spread out, with 24.3% under the age of 19, 4.3% from 20 to 24, 20.0% from 25 to 44, 26.2% from 45 to 64, and 49.0% who were 65 years of age or older. The median age was 54.8 years. For every 100 females, there were 139.5 males. For every 100 females age 18 and over, there were 132.6 males age 18 and over.

== Transportation ==
Kansas Highway 18 (K-18), an east–west route, runs southeast–northwest through the central part of the township. Kansas Highway 232 (K-232), a north–south route, enters the township's southeastern corner from the south, turns northwestward, and crosses Wilson Dam before turning north once again and finally terminating at its junction with K-18. Kansas Highway 181 (K-181) terminates in the southeastern corner of the township at its junction with K-232. In addition, a network of mostly unpaved county roads is laid out in a rough grid pattern across the township. North Road, also called 202nd Street, is a paved north–south road that runs north from K-18 to the county line.
