= Pleasant Township, Lincoln County, Kansas =

Township in Lincoln County, Kansas, U.S.

Pleasant Township
- Township
- Location in Lincoln County
- Coordinates: 38.999933°N 98.438716°W
- Country: United States
- State: Kansas
- County: Lincoln

Area
  - Total: 36.016 sq mi (93.28 km^{2})
  - Land: 36.012 sq mi (93.27 km^{2})
  - Water: 0.004 sq mi (0.010 km^{2}) 0.01%

Population (2020)
  - Total: 419
  - Density: 11.6/sq mi (4.49/km^{2})
- Time zone: UTC-6 (CST)
  - Summer (DST): UTC-5 (CDT)
- Area code: 785

Pleasant Township is a township in Lincoln County, Kansas, United States. As of the 2020 census, its population was 419.

== Geography ==
Pleasant Township covers an area of 36.016 square miles (93.28 square kilometers).

=== Communities ===
- Sylvan Grove

=== Adjacent townships ===
- Hanover Township, Lincoln County (north)
- Grant Township, Lincoln County (northeast)
- Vesper Township, Lincoln County (east)
- Golden Belt Township, Lincoln County (southeast)
- Highland Township, Lincoln County (south)
- Plymouth Township, Russell County (southwest)
- Fairview Township, Russell County (west)

=== Major highways ===
- K-18
- K-181
