= K181 =

K181 or K-181 may refer to:

- K-181 (Kansas highway), a state highway in Kansas
- HMCS Sackville (K181)
