= Hanover Township, Lincoln County, Kansas =

Township in Lincoln County, Kansas, U.S.

Hanover Township
- Township
- Location in Lincoln County
- Coordinates: 39.095881°N 98.419742°W
- Country: United States
- State: Kansas
- County: Lincoln

Area
  - Total: 35.998 sq mi (93.23 km^{2})
  - Land: 35.962 sq mi (93.14 km^{2})
  - Water: 0.036 sq mi (0.093 km^{2}) 0.10%

Population (2020)
  - Total: 57
  - Density: 1.6/sq mi (0.61/km^{2})
- Time zone: UTC-6 (CST)
  - Summer (DST): UTC-5 (CDT)
- Area code: 785

Hanover Township is a township in Lincoln County, Kansas, United States. As of the 2020 census, its population was 57.

== Geography ==
Hanover Township covers an area of 36.296 square miles (94.01 square kilometers).

=== Adjacent townships ===
- Cedron Township, Lincoln County (north)
- Orange Township, Lincoln County (northeast)
- Grant Township, Lincoln County (east)
- Vesper Township, Lincoln County (southeast)
- Pleasant Township, Lincoln County (south)
- Fairview Township, Russell County (west)

=== Major highways ===
- K-181
