= Marion Township, Lincoln County, Kansas =

Township in Lincoln County, Kansas, U.S.

Marion Township
- Township
- Location in Lincoln County
- Coordinates: 39.091369°N 98.205023°W
- Country: United States
- State: Kansas
- County: Lincoln

Area
  - Total: 35.507 sq mi (91.96 km^{2})
  - Land: 35.472 sq mi (91.87 km^{2})
  - Water: 0.035 sq mi (0.091 km^{2}) 0.10%

Population (2020)
  - Total: 113
  - Density: 3.19/sq mi (1.23/km^{2})
- Time zone: UTC-6 (CST)
  - Summer (DST): UTC-5 (CDT)
- Area code: 785

Marion Township is a township in Lincoln County, Kansas, United States. As of the 2020 census, its population was 113.

== Geography ==
Marion Township covers an area of 35.507 square miles (91.96 square kilometers).

=== Communities ===
- Part of Lincoln Center (county seat)

=== Adjacent townships ===
- Battle Creek Township, Lincoln County (north)
- Scott Township, Lincoln County (northeast)
- Beaver Township, Lincoln County (east)
- Elkhorn Township, Lincoln County (southeast)
- Indiana Township, Lincoln County (south)
- Vesper Township, Lincoln County (southwest)
- Grant Township, Lincoln County (west)

=== Major highways ===
- K-14
- K-18
