= Wilson State Park (Kansas) =

State park in Kansas, United States

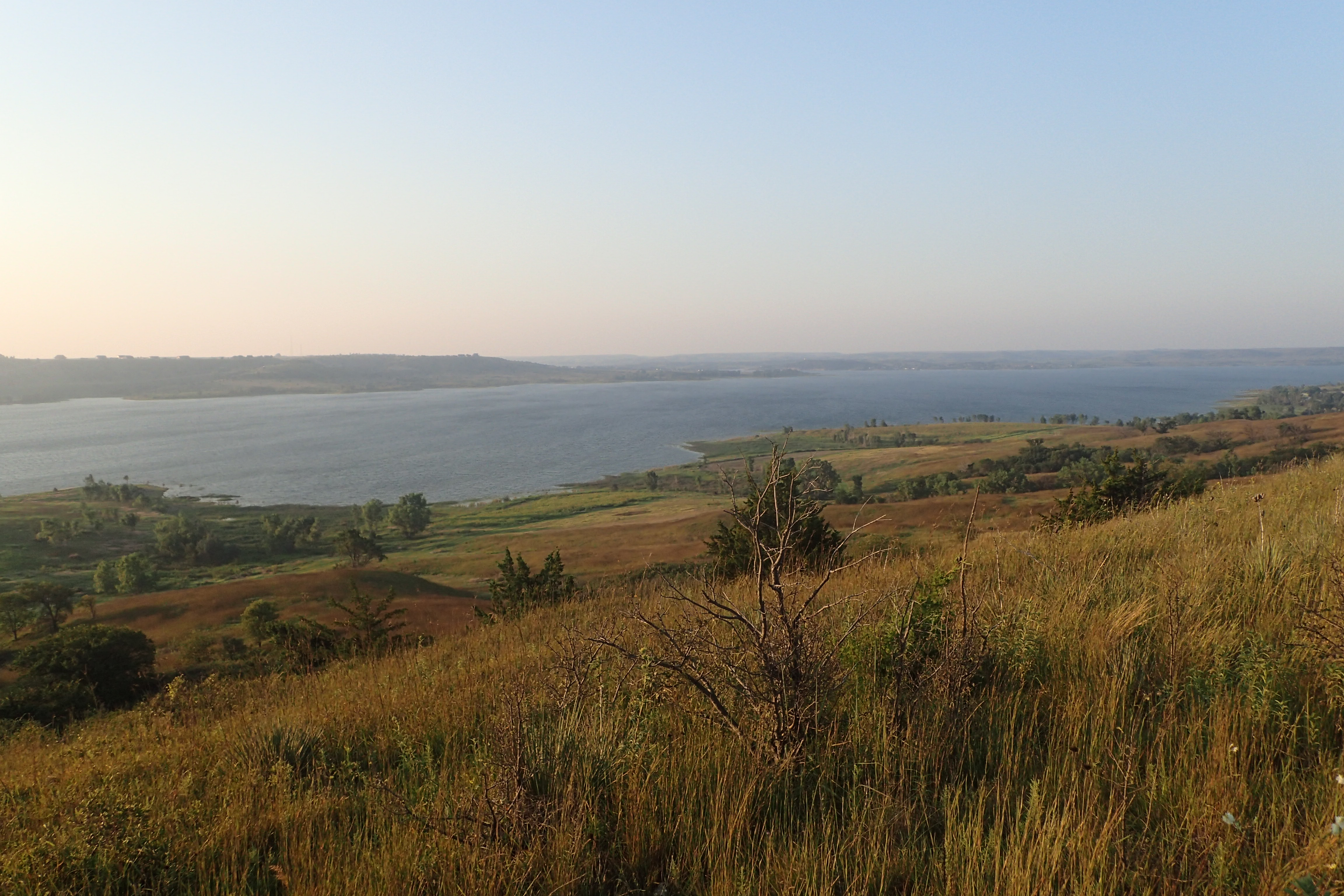

- Location within Kansas Location within the United States
- Interactive map of Wilson State Park
- Location: Russell County, Kansas, United States
- Coordinates: 38°55′00″N 98°30′16″W
- Area: 945 acres (382 ha)
- Elevation: 1,513 ft (461 m)
- Established: 1966
- Administrator: Kansas Department of Wildlife and Parks
- Visitors: 334,652 (in 2022)
- Website: Official website
- Kansas State Parks

Wilson State Park is a public recreation area found on the south shore of 9,000-acre (3,600 ha) Wilson Lake reservoir approximately 10 miles (16 km) north of the city of Wilson in Russell County, Kansas, United States. Located at the reservoir's eastern end, the state park covers 945 acres (382 ha) divided into two areas by the reservoir's southeastern arm: the Hell Creek area on the west side and the Otoe area on the east side. The Hell Creek area hosts a marina. Both areas include hiking trails, swimming beaches, boat ramps, and camping facilities.

== See also ==
- List of lakes, reservoirs, and dams in Kansas
- List of rivers of Kansas
