= Vesper Township, Kansas =

Township in Lincoln County, Kansas, U.S.

Vesper Township
- Township
- Location in Lincoln County
- Coordinates: 38.99744°N 98.324698°W
- Country: United States
- State: Kansas
- County: Lincoln

Area
  - Total: 36.645 sq mi (94.91 km^{2})
  - Land: 36.63 sq mi (94.9 km^{2})
  - Water: 0.015 sq mi (0.039 km^{2}) 0.26%

Population (2020)
  - Total: 71
  - Density: 1.9/sq mi (0.75/km^{2})
- Time zone: UTC-6 (CST)
  - Summer (DST): UTC-5 (CDT)
- Area code: 785

Vesper Township is a township in Lincoln County, Kansas, United States. As of the 2020 census, its population was 71.

== Geography ==
Vesper Township covers an area of 36.645 square miles (94.91 square kilometers).

=== Communities ===
- Vesper

=== Adjacent townships ===
- Grant Township, Lincoln County (north)
- Marion Township, Lincoln County (northeast)
- Indiana Township, Lincoln County (east)
- Valley Township, Lincoln County (southeast)
- Golden Belt Township, Lincoln County (south)
- Highland Township, Lincoln County (southwest)
- Pleasant Township, Lincoln County (west)
- Hanover Township, Lincoln County (northwest)

=== Major highways ===
- K-18
