= Elkhorn Township, Kansas =

Township in Lincoln County, Kansas, U.S.

Elkhorn Township
- Township
- Location in Lincoln County
- Coordinates: 39.003253°N 98.093044°W
- Country: United States
- State: Kansas
- County: Lincoln

Area
  - Total: 35.973 sq mi (93.17 km^{2})
  - Land: 35.964 sq mi (93.15 km^{2})
  - Water: 0.009 sq mi (0.023 km^{2}) 0.03%

Population (2020)
  - Total: 871
  - Density: 24.2/sq mi (9.35/km^{2})
- Time zone: UTC-6 (CST)
  - Summer (DST): UTC-5 (CDT)
- Area code: 785

Elkhorn Township is a township in Lincoln County, Kansas, United States. As of the 2020 census, its population was 871.

== Geography ==
Elkhorn Township covers an area of 35.973 square miles (93.17 square kilometers).

=== Communities ===
- part of Lincoln Center (county seat)

=== Adjacent townships ===
- Beaver Township, Lincoln County (north)
- Logan Township, Lincoln County (northeast)
- Colorado Township, Lincoln County (east)
- Madison Township, Lincoln County (southeast)
- Franklin Township, Lincoln County (south)
- Valley Township, Lincoln County (southwest)
- Indiana Township, Lincoln County (west)
- Marion Township, Lincoln County (northwest)

=== Major highways ===
- K-14
- K-18
