= Logan Township, Lincoln County, Kansas =

Township in Lincoln County, Kansas, U.S.

Logan Township
- Township
- Location in Lincoln County
- Coordinates: 39.080534°N 97.986951°W
- Country: United States
- State: Kansas
- County: Lincoln

Area
  - Total: 35.801 sq mi (92.72 km^{2})
  - Land: 35.683 sq mi (92.42 km^{2})
  - Water: 0.118 sq mi (0.31 km^{2}) 0.33%

Population (2020)
  - Total: 50
  - Density: 1.4/sq mi (0.54/km^{2})
- Time zone: UTC-6 (CST)
  - Summer (DST): UTC-5 (CDT)
- Area code: 785

Logan Township is a township in Lincoln County, Kansas, United States. As of the 2020 census, its population was 50.

== Geography ==
Logan Township covers an area of 35.801 square miles (92.72 square kilometers).

=== Adjacent townships ===
- Salt Creek Township, Lincoln County (north)
- Fountain Township, Ottawa County (northeast)
- Henry Township, Ottawa County (east)
- Morton Township, Ottawa County (southeast)
- Colorado Township, Lincoln County (south)
- Elkhorn Township, Lincoln County (southwest)
- Beaver Township, Lincoln County (west)
