= Beaver Township, Lincoln County, Kansas =

Township in Lincoln County, Kansas, U.S.

Beaver Township
- Township
- Location in Lincoln County
- Coordinates: 39.085254°N 98.107238°W
- Country: United States
- State: Kansas
- County: Lincoln

Area
  - Total: 35.851 sq mi (92.85 km^{2})
  - Land: 35.841 sq mi (92.83 km^{2})
  - Water: 0.01 sq mi (0.026 km^{2}) 0.03%

Population (2020)
  - Total: 356
  - Density: 9.93/sq mi (3.84/km^{2})
- Time zone: UTC-6 (CST)
  - Summer (DST): UTC-5 (CDT)
- Area code: 785

Beaver Township is a township in Lincoln County, Kansas, United States. As of the 2020 census, its population was 356.

== Geography ==
Beaver Township covers an area of 35.851 square miles (92.85 square kilometers).

=== Communities ===
- part of Lincoln Center (county seat)

=== Adjacent townships ===
- Scott Township, Lincoln County (north)
- Salt Creek Township, Lincoln County (northeast)
- Logan Township, Lincoln County (east)
- Colorado Township, Lincoln County (southeast)
- Elkhorn Township, Lincoln County (south)
- Indiana Township, Lincoln County (southwest)
- Marion Township, Lincoln County (west)

=== Major highways ===
- K-14
- K-18
