= Indiana Township, Lincoln County, Kansas =

Township in Lincoln County, Kansas, U.S.

Indiana Township
- Township
- Location in Lincoln County
- Coordinates: 39.008504°N 98.197849°W
- Country: United States
- State: Kansas
- County: Lincoln

Area
  - Total: 35.739 sq mi (92.56 km^{2})
  - Land: 35.716 sq mi (92.50 km^{2})
  - Water: 0.023 sq mi (0.060 km^{2}) 0.64%

Population (2020)
  - Total: 121
  - Density: 3.39/sq mi (1.31/km^{2})
- Time zone: UTC-6 (CST)
  - Summer (DST): UTC-5 (CDT)
- Area code: 785

Indiana Township is a township in Lincoln County, Kansas, United States. As of the 2020 census, its population was 121.

== Geography ==
Indiana Township covers an area of 35.739 square miles (92.56 square kilometers).

=== Communities ===
- Part of Lincoln Center (county seat)

=== Adjacent townships ===
- Marion Township, Lincoln County (north)
- Beaver Township, Lincoln County (northeast)
- Elkhorn Township, Lincoln County (east)
- Franklin Township, Lincoln County (southeast)
- Valley Township, Lincoln County (south)
- Golden Belt Township, Lincoln County (southwest)
- Vesper Township, Lincoln County (west)
- Grant Township, Lincoln County (northwest)

=== Major highways ===
- K-14
- K-18
