= Morton Township, Ottawa County, Kansas =

Township in Ottawa County, Kansas, U.S.

Morton Township
- Township
- Location within Ottawa County
- Coordinates: 39.004827°N 97.867439°W
- Country: United States
- State: Kansas
- County: Ottawa

Area
  - Total: 35.887 sq mi (92.95 km^{2})
  - Land: 35.86 sq mi (92.9 km^{2})
  - Water: 0.027 sq mi (0.070 km^{2}) 0.08%
- Elevation: 1,293 ft (394 m)

Population (2020)
  - Total: 404
  - Density: 11.3/sq mi (4.35/km^{2})
- Time zone: UTC-6 (CST)
  - Summer (DST): UTC-5 (CDT)
- Area code: 785
- GNIS feature ID: 476455

Morton Township is a township in Ottawa County, Kansas, United States. As of the 2020 census, its population was 404.

== Geography ==
Morton Township covers an area of 35.887 square miles (92.95 square kilometers). The Saline River flows through it.

=== Communities ===
- Tescott

=== Adjacent townships ===
- Henry Township, Ottawa County (north)
- Center Township, Ottawa County (northeast)
- Culver Township, Ottawa County (east)
- Pleasant Valley Township, Saline County (southeast)
- Glendale Township, Saline County (south)
- Madison Township, Lincoln County (southwest)
- Colorado Township, Lincoln County (west)
- Logan Township, Lincoln County (northwest)

== Transportation ==
=== Major highways ===
- K-18
