= Colorado Township, Kansas =

Township in Lincoln County, Kansas, U.S.

Colorado Township
- Township
- Location in Lincoln County
- Coordinates: 38.997401°N 97.975037°W
- Country: United States
- State: Kansas
- County: Lincoln

Area
  - Total: 36.134 sq mi (93.59 km^{2})
  - Land: 36.127 sq mi (93.57 km^{2})
  - Water: 0.007 sq mi (0.018 km^{2}) 0.02%

Population (2020)
  - Total: 234
  - Density: 6.48/sq mi (2.50/km^{2})
- Time zone: UTC-6 (CST)
  - Summer (DST): UTC-5 (CDT)
- Area code: 785

Colorado Township is a township in Lincoln County, Kansas, United States. As of the 2020 census, its population was 234.

== Geography ==
Colorado Township covers an area of 36.134 square miles (93.59 square kilometers).

=== Communities ===
- Beverly

=== Adjacent townships ===
- Logan Township, Lincoln County (north)
- Henry Township, Ottawa County (northeast)
- Morton Township, Ottawa County (east)
- Glendale Township, Saline County (southeast)
- Madison Township, Lincoln County (south)
- Franklin Township, Lincoln County (southwest)
- Elkhorn Township, Lincoln County (west)
- Beaver Township, Lincoln County (northwest)

=== Major highways ===
- K-18
