= Henry Township, Kansas =

Township in Ottawa County, Kansas, U.S.

Henry Township
- Township
- Location within Ottawa County
- Coordinates: 39.079437°N 97.873401°W
- Country: United States
- State: Kansas
- County: Ottawa

Area
  - Total: 35.88 sq mi (92.9 km^{2})
  - Land: 35.85 sq mi (92.9 km^{2})
  - Water: 0.03 sq mi (0.078 km^{2}) 0.08%
- Elevation: 1,408 ft (429 m)

Population (2020)
  - Total: 36
  - Density: 1.0/sq mi (0.39/km^{2})
- Time zone: UTC-6 (CST)
  - Summer (DST): UTC-5 (CDT)
- Area code: 785
- GNIS feature ID: 476273

Henry Township is a township in Ottawa County, Kansas, United States. As of the 2020 census, its population was 36.

== Geography ==
Henry Township covers an area of 35.88 square miles (92.9 square kilometers).

=== Adjacent townships ===
- Fountain Township, Ottawa County (north)
- Garfield Township, Ottawa County (northeast)
- Center Township, Ottawa County (east)
- Culver Township, Ottawa County (southeast)
- Morton Township, Ottawa County (south)
- Colorado Township, Lincoln County (southwest)
- Logan Township, Lincoln County (west)
- Salt Creek Township, Lincoln County (northwest)
