= Grant Township, Lincoln County, Kansas =

Township in Lincoln County, Kansas, U.S.

Grant Township
- Township
- Location in Lincoln County
- Coordinates: 39.08173°N 98.33402°W
- Country: United States
- State: Kansas
- County: Lincoln

Area
  - Total: 36.296 sq mi (94.01 km^{2})
  - Land: 36.286 sq mi (93.98 km^{2})
  - Water: 0.01 sq mi (0.026 km^{2}) 0.03%

Population (2020)
  - Total: 55
  - Density: 1.5/sq mi (0.59/km^{2})
- Time zone: UTC-6 (CST)
  - Summer (DST): UTC-5 (CDT)
- Area code: 785

Grant Township is a township in Lincoln County, Kansas, United States. As of the 2020 census, its population was 55.

== Geography ==
Grant Township covers an area of 36.296 square miles (94.01 square kilometers).

=== Communities ===
- Denmark

=== Adjacent townships ===
- Orange Township, Lincoln County (north)
- Battle Creek Township, Lincoln County (northeast)
- Marion Township, Lincoln County (east)
- Indiana Township, Lincoln County (southeast)
- Vesper Township, Lincoln County (south)
- Pleasant Township, Lincoln County (southwest)
- Hanover Township, Lincoln County (west)

=== Major highways ===
- K-18
