= K-232 (Kansas highway) =

State highway in Kansas, U.S.

K-232
- K-232 highlighted in red

Route information
- Maintained by KDOT
- Length: 17.263 mi (27.782 km)
- Existed: August 23, 1961–present
- Tourist routes: Post Rock Scenic Byway

Major junctions
- South end: Old US-40 (27th Street) in Wilson
- I-70 / US-40 north of Wilson
- North end: K-18 east of Lucas

Location
- Country: United States
- State: Kansas
- Counties: Russell, Lincoln, Ellsworth

Highway system
- Kansas State Highway System; Interstate; US; State; Spurs
← K-231	→ K-233

K-232 is a 17.263-mile-long (27.782 km) north–south state highway in central Kansas connecting the cities of Wilson and Lucas. The highway was first established in 1961 and expanded over the following two years. K-232 is designated by the Kansas Department of Transportation as the Post Rock Scenic Byway. The scenic byway derives its name from the abundant Fencepost limestone, also known as the Post Rock, which early settlers used as fence posts and in other construction in place of wood. The route was designated as a scenic byway both for the natural beauty of the area and unique towns located each end of the highway. Annual average daily traffic on the highway ranges from 238 to 340, and the entire route is paved with partial design bituminous pavement.

== History ==
K-232's route was first designated on August 23, 1961 as the part of the current highway between Interstate 70 and Old U.S. 40 (then U.S. Route 40). The rest of the highway's route was established over the following two years. K-232 has been paved since the highway was designated. Due to the area's natural beauty and unique heritage, K-232 has been designated by the Kansas Department of Transportation as the Post Rock Scenic Byway, named for the abundance of limestone fence posts found throughout the Smoky Hills region.

== Route description ==
The highway begins at an intersection with Old U.S. 40 in Ellsworth County, on the eastern side of the city of Wilson. From there, it travels northward 1.753 miles (2.821 km) along the eastern side of Wilson and through agricultural lands to a junction with Interstate 70. After crossing Interstate 70, K-232 turns and continues in a generally west of north direction across the Ellsworth/Lincoln county line. After crossing the county line, the highway continues on a slightly west of north heading until reaching Wilson Lake. Upon reaching Wilson Lake, K-232 travels along the eastern side of the lake, crossing into Russell County. K-232 then has a junction with K-181 at the southeastern end of Wilson Dam, turns northwest, and travels along the top of the dam. A short distance after crossing the dam, K-232 turns due north and travels through more rural land to its northern terminus at K-18 highway.

K-232 is not a part of the United States National Highway System. K-232 connects to the National Highway System at its junction with Interstate 70. The entire route is paved with partial design bituminous pavement. Annual average daily traffic (AADT) in Ellsworth County ranges from 307 from Interstate 70 to the Ellsworth/Lincoln county line to 333 closer to the city of Wilson. In Lincoln County, AADT values are 308 for the first three miles (4.8 km), 315 for the next one mile (1.6 km), and 340 for the final one mile (1.6 km) before entering Russell County. In Russell County, AADT values range from 305 to 340 south of the junction with K-181 and from 238 to 280 between K-181 and the northern terminus at K-18.

== Major intersections ==
County	Location	mi	km	Destinations	Notes
Ellsworth	Wilson	0.000	0.000	Old US-40 (27th Street) – Ellsworth, Russell	Southern terminus
Ellsworth	Wilson Township	1.753	2.821	I-70 / US-40 – Hays, Salina	Exit 206 on I-70; diamond interchange
Lincoln	No major junctions				
Russell	Fairview Township	9.962	16.032	K-181 north – Sylvan Grove	Southern terminus of K-181
Russell	Fairview Township	17.263	27.782	K-18 – Lucas, Lincoln	Northern terminus
1.000 mi = 1.609 km; 1.000 km = 0.621 mi
