= Wilson, Kansas =

City in Ellsworth County, Kansas

- City
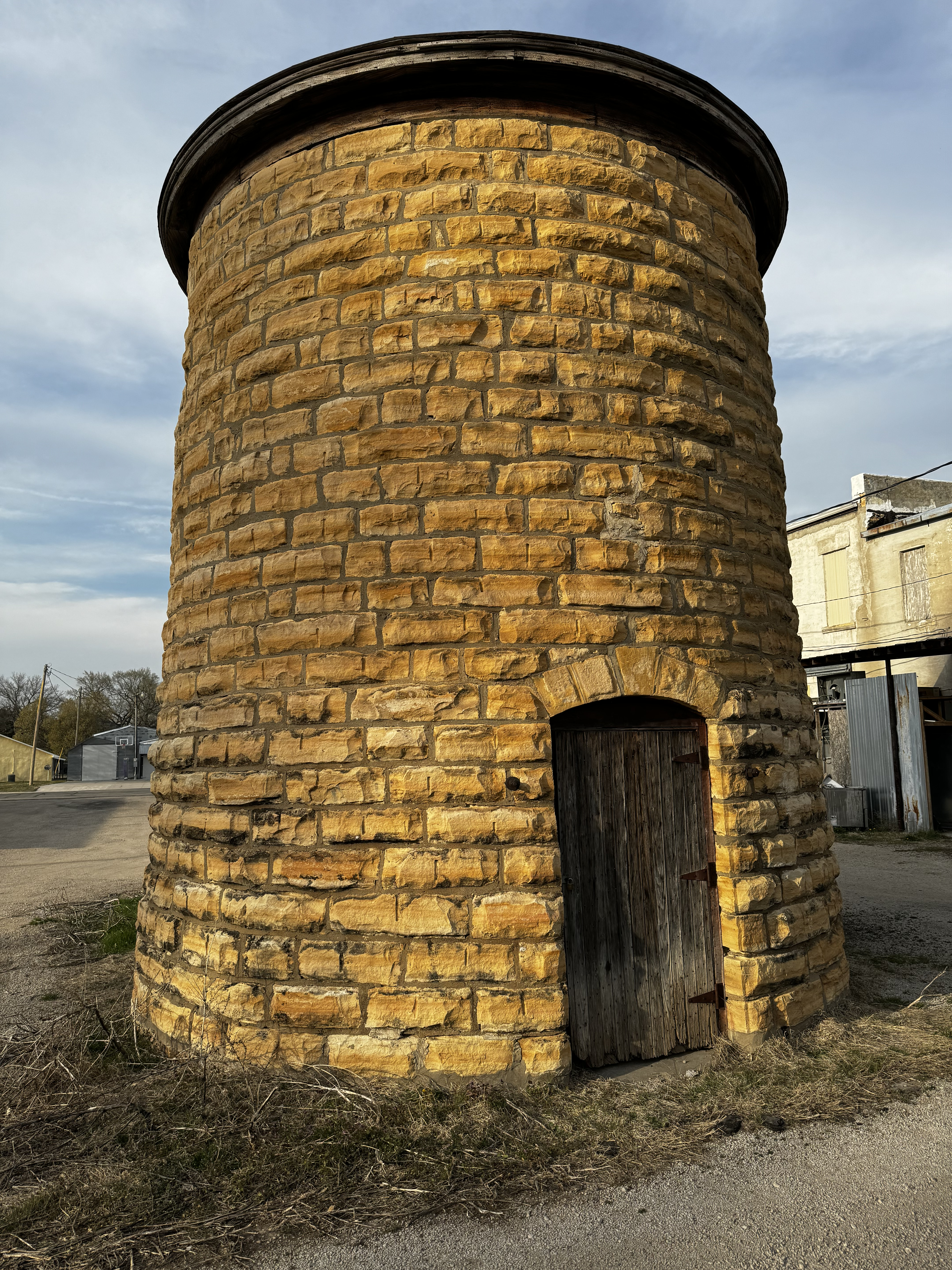
- Tobias water tower in Wilson (2024)
- Motto: "Czech Capital of Kansas"
- Location within County and Kansas

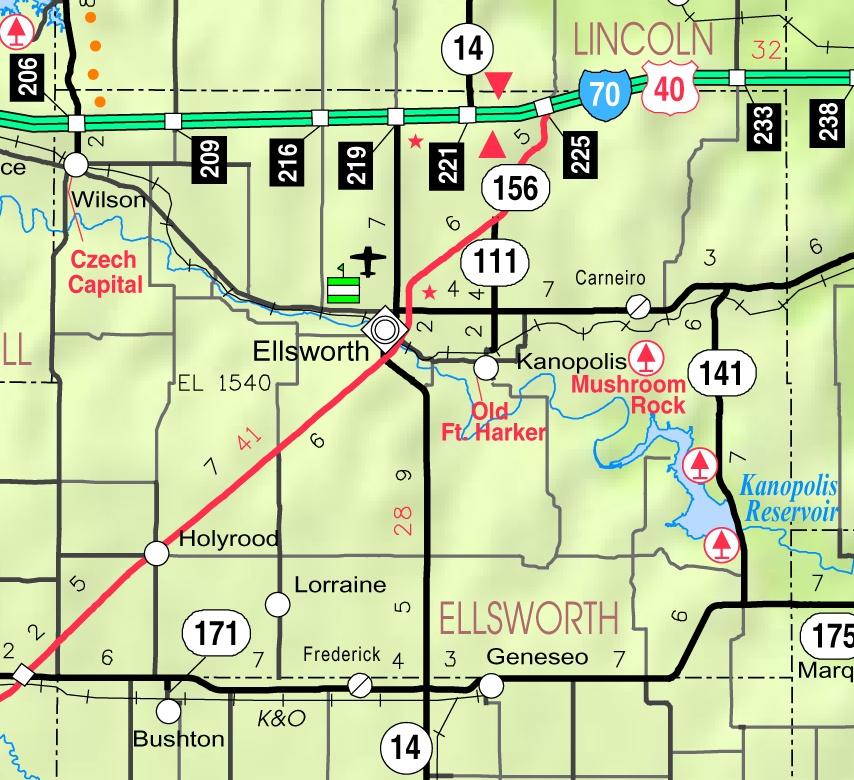
- KDOT map of Ellsworth County (legend)
- Coordinates: 38°49′31″N 98°28′30″W
- Country: United States
- State: Kansas
- County: Ellsworth
- Founded: 1871
- Incorporated: 1883
- Named for: Wilson Township

Government
  - Type: Mayor–Council
  - Mayor: Dan Taylor

Area
  - Total: 0.60 sq mi (1.55 km^{2})
  - Land: 0.60 sq mi (1.55 km^{2})
  - Water: 0 sq mi (0.00 km^{2})
- Elevation: 1,690 ft (520 m)

Population (2020)
  - Total: 859
  - Density: 1,440/sq mi (554/km^{2})
- Time zone: UTC-6 (CST)
  - Summer (DST): UTC-5 (CDT)
- ZIP Code: 67490
- Area code: 785
- FIPS code: 20-79675
- GNIS ID: 2397332
- Website: wilsonkansas.com

Wilson is a city in Ellsworth County, Kansas, United States. The community promotes itself as the "Czech Capital of Kansas" due to the role of Czech immigrant settlers in its early history. As of the 2020 census, the population of the city was 859.

== History ==
The Butterfield Overland Despatch built a stagecoach station one-half mile south of present-day Wilson in 1865. Three years later, the Kansas Pacific Railway built Wilson Station, named after the surrounding township, at the modern town site. In 1871, The National Land Company surveyed and planned the first town there, naming it Bosland in the hopes of attracting the cattle trade. Settlers from Pennsylvania, including some Pennsylvania Dutch, arrived over the following year. The settlement never became a center of the cattle trade, however, and continued to be known as Wilson, a name the U.S. Post Office officially codified in 1873.

Beginning in 1874, Czech immigrants from Bohemia came to Wilson to work on the railroad, establishing the town as an area center of Czech culture.

Wilson was incorporated as a city in 1883.

== Geography ==
Wilson is located in north-central Kansas 1.5 miles (2.4 km) south of the intersection of Interstate 70 and Kansas Highway 232 (K-232), Wilson is 95 miles (153 km) northwest of Wichita, 205 miles (330 km) west of Kansas City and 15 miles (24 km) northwest of Ellsworth, the county seat.

Wilson lies in the Smoky Hills region of the Great Plains, approximately 2 miles (3.2 km) north of the Smoky Hill River and 6 miles (9.7 km) south of Wilson Lake. Wilson Creek, a tributary of the Smoky Hill, flows south along the east side of the city.

According to the United States Census Bureau, the city has a total area of 0.60 square miles (1.55 km^{2}), all land.

== Demographics ==
Historical population
Census	Pop.	Note	%±
1880	458		—
1890	770		68.1%
1900	939		21.9%
1910	981		4.5%
1920	1,020		4.0%
1930	1,038		1.8%
1940	1,068		2.9%
1950	1,039		−2.7%
1960	905		−12.9%
1970	870		−3.9%
1980	978		12.4%
1990	834		−14.7%
2000	799		−4.2%
2010	781		−2.3%
2020	859		10.0%
U.S. Decennial Census

=== 2010 census ===
As of the census of 2010, there were 781 people, 331 households, and 203 families residing in the city. The population density was 1,301.7 inhabitants per square mile (502.6/km^{2}). There were 405 housing units at an average density of 675.0 per square mile (260.6/km^{2}). The racial makeup of the city was 94.9% White, 0.4% African American, 0.1% American Indian, 0.3% Asian, 0.4% from other races, and 4.0% from two or more races. Hispanics and Latinos of any race were 3.5% of the population.

There were 331 households, of which 24.5% had children under the age of 18 living with them, 49.2% were married couples living together, 7.6% had a female householder with no husband present, 4.5% had a male householder with no wife present, and 38.7% were non-families. 32.3% of all households were made up of individuals, and 17.5% had someone living alone who was 65 years of age or older. The average household size was 2.24 and the average family size was 2.82.

The median age in the city was 47.6 years. 20.5% of residents were under the age of 18; 6.3% were between the ages of 18 and 24; 19% were from 25 to 44; 29.2% were from 45 to 64; and 24.8% were 65 years of age or older. The gender makeup of the city was 47.9% male and 52.1% female.

The median income for a household in the city was $44,250, and the median income for a family was $55,542. Males had a median income of $37,273 versus $20,417 for females. The per capita income for the city was $21,109. 5.2% of families and 7.8% of the population were below the poverty line, including 12.5% of those under age 18 and 16.3% of those age 65 or over.

=== 2000 census ===
As of the census of 2000, there were 799 people, 333 households, and 205 families residing in the city. The population density was 1,436.7 inhabitants per square mile (554.7/km^{2}). There were 406 housing units at an average density of 730.0 per square mile (281.9/km^{2}). The racial makeup of the city was 98.87% White, 0.13% from other races, and 1.00% from two or more races. Hispanic or Latino of any race were 1.13% of the population.

There were 333 households, out of which 27.0% had children under the age of 18 living with them, 52.6% were married couples living together, 5.4% had a female householder with no husband present, and 38.4% were non-families. 35.4% of all households were made up of individuals, and 21.6% had someone living alone who was 65 years of age or older. The average household size was 2.26 and the average family size was 2.89.

In the city, the population was spread out, with 22.5% under the age of 18, 5.4% from 18 to 24, 21.5% from 25 to 44, 22.3% from 45 to 64, and 28.3% who were 65 years of age or older. The median age was 46 years. For every 100 females, there were 83.3 males. For every 100 females age 18 and over, there were 81.0 males.

As of 2000 the median income for a household in the city was $34,821, and the median income for a family was $47,768. Males had a median income of $28,173 versus $23,000 for females. The per capita income for the city was $16,622. About 2.0% of families and 7.0% of the population were below the poverty line, including 4.0% of those under age 18 and 12.9% of those age 65 or over.

== Economy ==
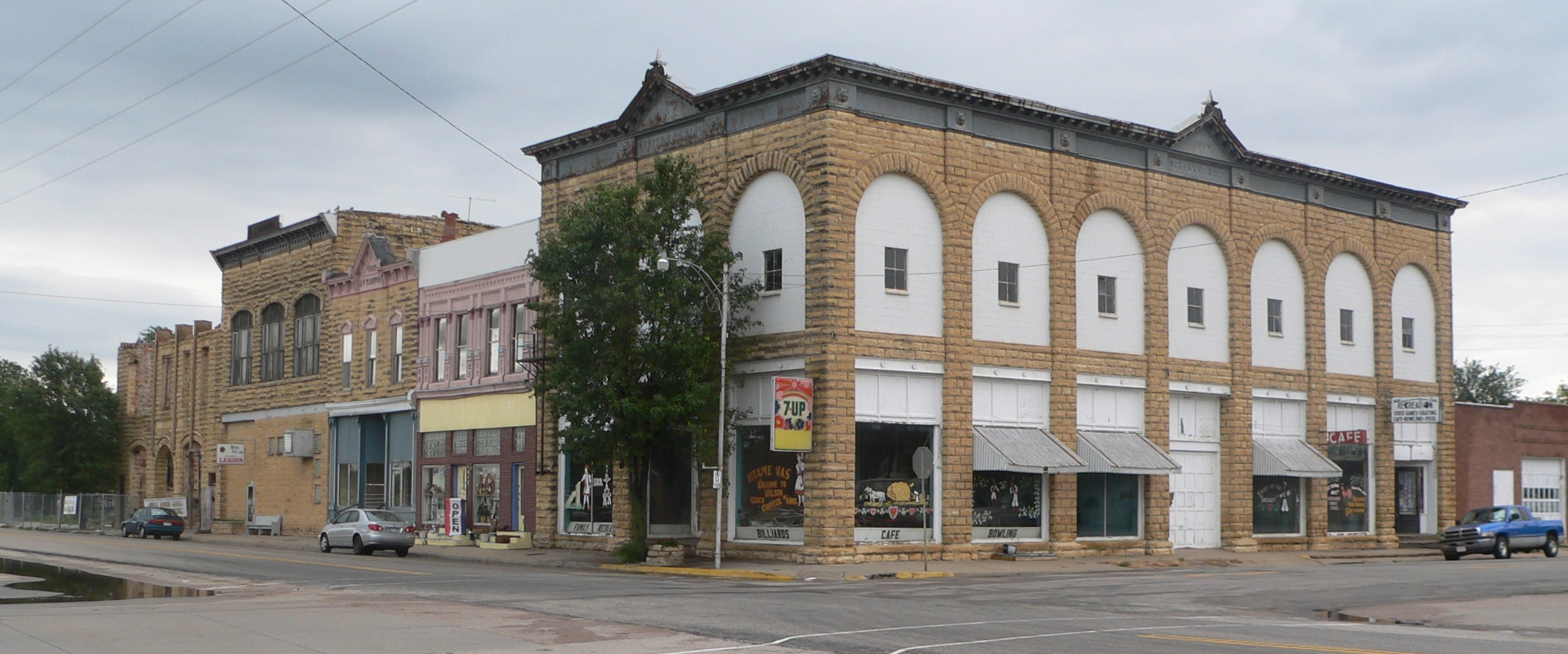
Wilson Downtown Historic District #3 (2014)

As of 2012, 67.2% of the population over the age of 16 was in the labor force. None of the population was in the armed forces, and 67.2% was in the civilian labor force with 65.4% being employed and 1.9% unemployed. The composition, by occupation, of the employed civilian labor force was: 26.7% in service occupations; 26.3% in management, business, science, and arts; 21.9% in production, transportation, and material moving; 12.5% in natural resources, construction, and maintenance; and 12.5% in sales and office occupations. The three industries employing the largest percentages of the working civilian labor force were: educational services, health care, and social assistance (19.5%); manufacturing (15.5%); and public administration (11.3%).

The cost of living in Wilson is relatively low; compared to a U.S. average of 100, the cost of living index for the city is 79.2. As of 2012, the median home value in the city was $49,000, the median selected monthly owner cost was $761 for housing units with a mortgage and $324 for those without, and the median gross rent was $510.

== Government ==
Wilson is a city of the third class, according to state statute, with a mayor-council form of government. The city council consists of the mayor and five council members, and it meets on the first and third Monday of each month.

Wilson lies within Kansas's 1st U.S. Congressional District. For the purposes of representation in the Kansas Legislature, the city is located in the 35th district of the Kansas Senate and the 108th district of the Kansas House of Representatives.

== Education ==
The community is served by Central Plains USD 112 public school district. Wilson High School is one of two high schools in the district along with Central Plains High School. The Wilson High School mascot is Wilson Dragons.

== Infrastructure ==
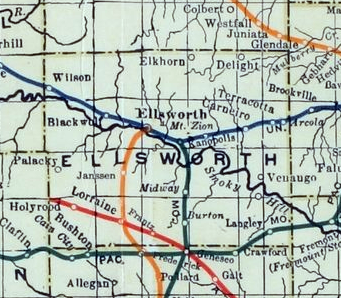
1915 railroad map of Ellsworth County

=== Transportation ===
Interstate 70 and U.S. Route 40 run concurrently east-west 1.5 miles (2.4 km) north of the city, intersecting K-232 which runs north-south along the eastern edge of the city. K-232 terminates at its intersection with the old alignment of U.S. 40 which runs northwest-southeast through Wilson.

The Kansas Pacific (KP) line of the Union Pacific Railroad runs northwest-southeast through Wilson, parallel to the old alignment of U.S. 40.

=== Utilities ===
Rolling Hills Electric Co-Op, Inc. provides electric power. Wilson Communications offers landline telephone, internet and cable tv service. The city government is responsible for water provision. Local residents primarily use natural gas for heating fuel; service is provided by Midwest Energy.

== Media ==
Wilson is in the Wichita-Hutchinson, Kansas television market.

== Culture ==
=== Events ===
Due to the number of Czech immigrants who settled the area in 1874, Wilson was proclaimed the "Czech Capital of Kansas" on July 10, 1967 by Kansas Governor Robert Docking. As of 2012, 14.4% of the city population claimed Czech ancestry. To celebrate this heritage, the city holds an annual After Harvest Czech Festival on the last Saturday in July. The festival includes displays of Czech American culture, such as dancers and music, as well as a carnival, a parade, sports tournaments, talent contests, and other activities.

The city also holds a Halloween festival in October and a Christmas festival in December.

=== In popular culture and the arts ===
The Midland Hotel, located in Wilson, served as a filming location for the 1973 film Paper Moon.

Wilson was also home of the historic Wilson Opera House. Originally built in 1901, the building was destroyed in a massive fire in November 2009.

== Notable people ==
Notable individuals who were born in and/or have lived in Wilson include:

- Neva Egan (1914–2011), 1st First Lady of Alaska
- John Kuck (1905–1986), Olympic shot putter, gold medal at 1928 Summer Olympics

== Gallery ==
- Historic Images of Wilson, Special Photo Collections at Wichita State University Library
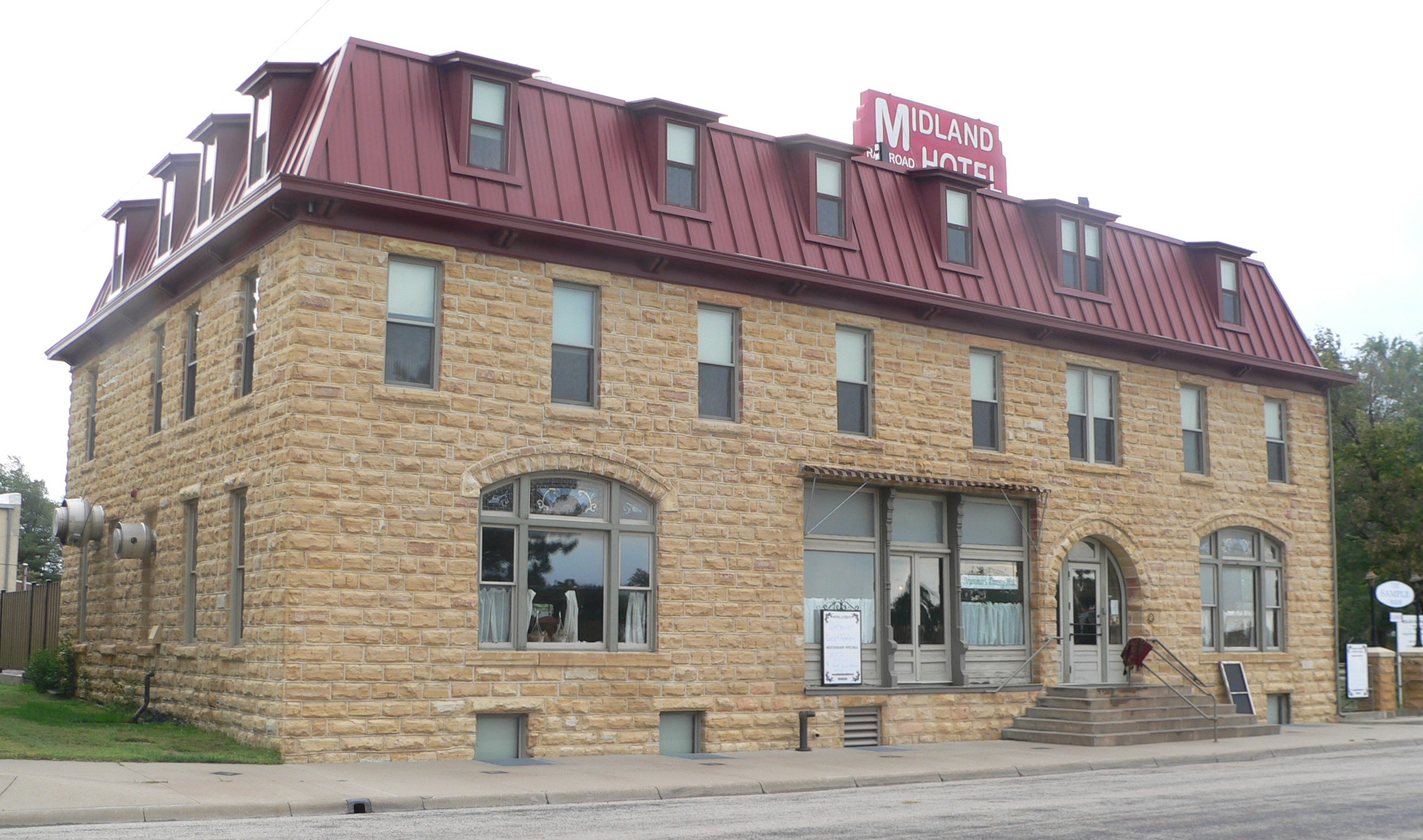
Midland Railroad Hotel (2014)

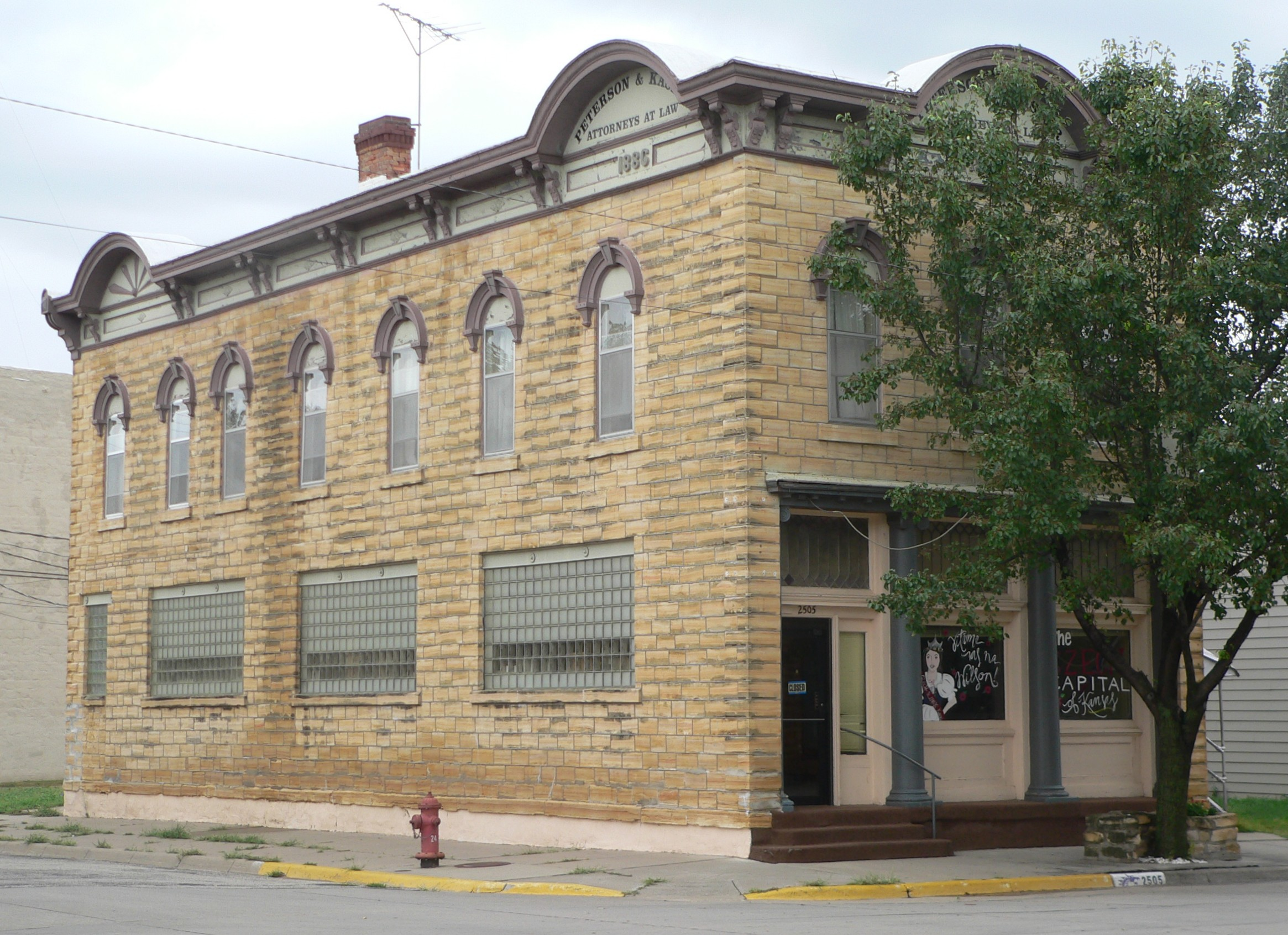
(2014)

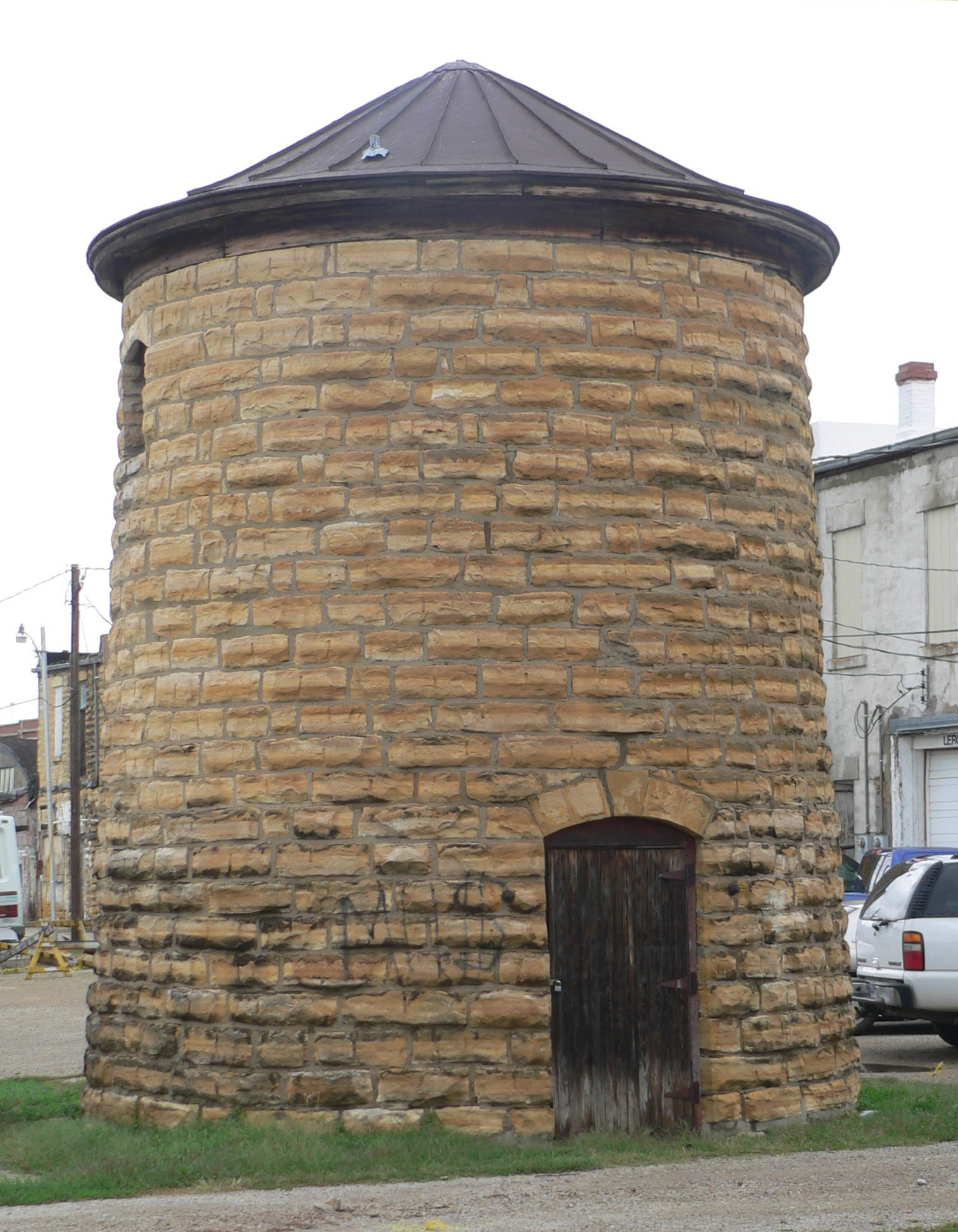
Tobias water tower (2014)

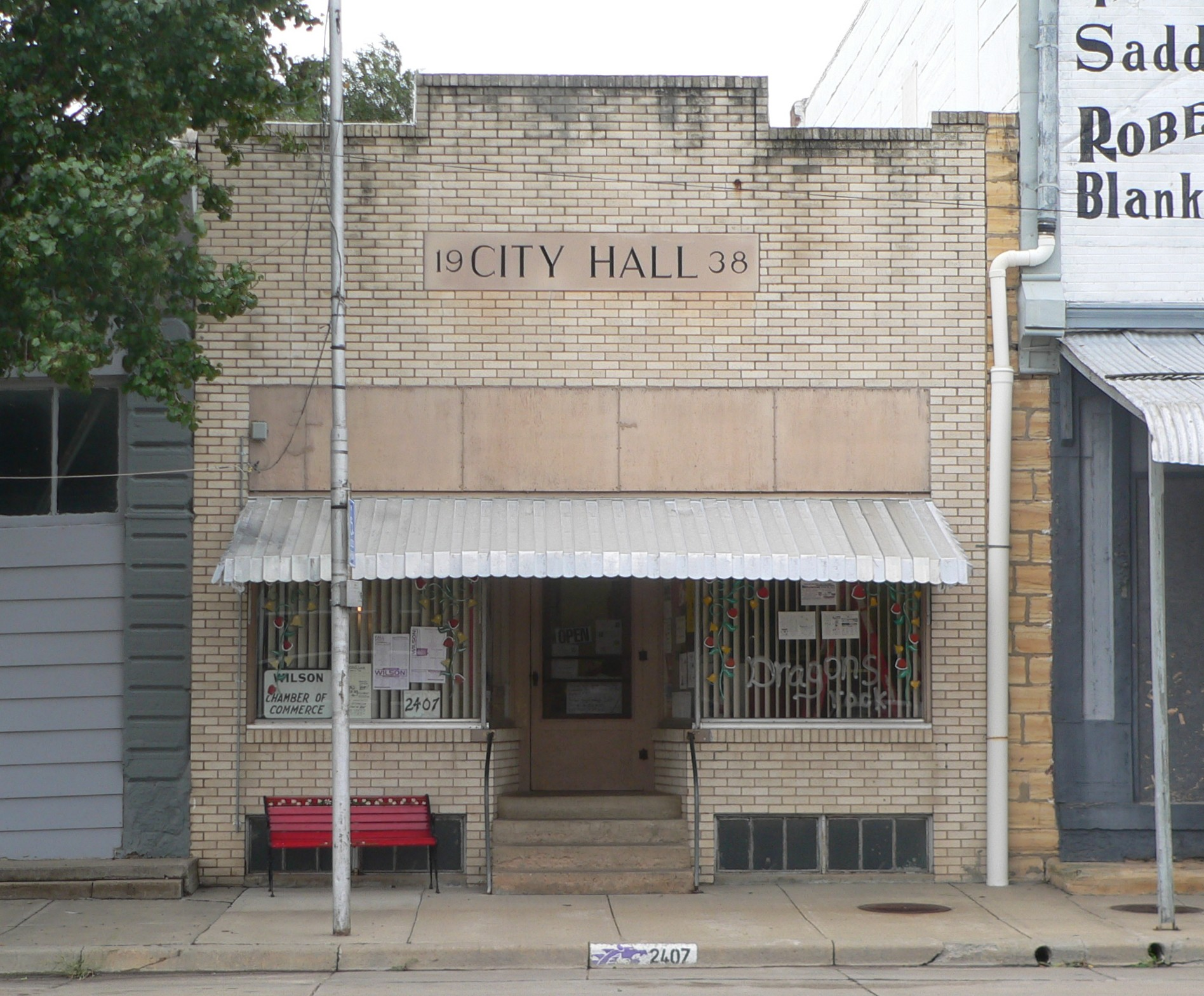
City hall (2014)

== See also ==
- Wilson State Park
