= Mulberry Township, Ellsworth County, Kansas =

Mulberry Township
- Township
- Location in Ellsworth County
- Coordinates: 38°49′39″N 097°59′02″W
- Country: United States
- State: Kansas
- County: Ellsworth

Area
  - Total: 35.97 sq mi (93.15 km^{2})
  - Land: 35.88 sq mi (92.93 km^{2})
  - Water: 0.085 sq mi (0.22 km^{2}) 0.24%
- Elevation: 1,499 ft (457 m)

Population (2020)
  - Total: 39
  - Density: 1.1/sq mi (0.42/km^{2})
- GNIS feature ID: 0475365

Mulberry Township is a township in Ellsworth County, Kansas, United States. As of the 2020 census, its population was 39.

== Geography ==
Mulberry Township covers an area of 35.97 square miles (93.2 km^{2}) and contains no incorporated settlements. According to the USGS, it contains one cemetery, Mulberry.

The stream of Table Rock Creek runs through this township.

== Transportation ==
Mulberry Township contains one airport or landing strip, Belcher Airport.
