= Garfield Township, Ellsworth County, Kansas =

Garfield Township
- Township
- Location in Ellsworth County
- Coordinates: 38°49′40″N 098°05′41″W
- Country: United States
- State: Kansas
- County: Ellsworth

Area
  - Total: 35.81 sq mi (92.75 km^{2})
  - Land: 35.70 sq mi (92.47 km^{2})
  - Water: 0.11 sq mi (0.28 km^{2}) 0.3%
- Elevation: 1,667 ft (508 m)

Population (2020)
  - Total: 62
  - Density: 1.7/sq mi (0.67/km^{2})
- GNIS feature ID: 0475357

Garfield Township is a township in Ellsworth County, Kansas, United States. As of the 2020 census, its population was 62.

== Geography ==
Garfield Township covers an area of 35.81 square miles (92.7 km^{2}) and contains no incorporated settlements.
