= K-181 (Kansas highway) =

State highway in Kansas, U.S.

K-181
- K-181 highlighted in red

Route information
- Maintained by KDOT and the city of Downs
- Length: 70.218 mi (113.005 km)
- Existed: January 7, 1937–present

Major junctions
- South end: K-232 at Wilson Lake Dam
- US-24 / K-9 in Downs
- North end: US-36 / US-281 south of Lebanon

Location
- Country: United States
- State: Kansas
- Counties: Lincoln, Mitchell, Osborne, Smith

Highway system
- Kansas State Highway System; Interstate; US; State; Spurs
← K-180	→ K-182

K-181 is a 70.2-mile-long (113.0 km) north–south state highway which runs through several counties in the north central part of the U.S. state of Kansas. K-181's southern terminus is at K-232 southeast of Lucas by Wilson Lake Dam, and the northern terminus is at U.S. Highway 36 (US-36) and US-281 south of Lebanon. Along the way the highway intersects US-24 and K-9 in Downs.

Before state highways were numbered in Kansas, the section of K-181 from the Solomon River north to Downs was part of the Roosevelt National Highway and Kansas White Way auto trails. A short section from Sylvan Grove southward was part of the Sunflower Trail. When K-181 was first designated on January 7, 1937, it extended from US-24 northward to US-36 and US-281. Then between 1948 and 1972, it was gradually extended southward to its current alignment.

== Route description ==
K-181 begins at K-232 (Post Rock Scenic Byway) near the Wilson Lake Dam just west of the Lincoln–Russell county line. The highway begins by traveling to the east through small rolling hills for just over one mile (1.6 km). The roadway then levels out entering rural farmlands and travels roughly 4.8 miles (7.7 km) before turning north. K-181 continues north, and after 2.2 miles (3.5 km) crosses West Twin Creek, and then the Saline River. Shortly after crossing the Saline River the highway enters the city of Sylvan Grove becoming South Main Street and passes the Lincoln County-Sylvan Grove Fair Grounds. About halfway through Sylvan Grove it intersects 1st Street and becomes North Main Street. After exiting Sylvan Grove K-181 continues north for a short distance, and then intersects K-18. From K-18, the highway continues north for approximately 7.7 miles (12.4 km) then crosses the South Branch Spillman Creek and then the North Branch Spillman Creek. Another roughly 4.6 miles (7.4 km) north from here the road enters Mitchell County, and then enters the city of Hunter. K-181 enters Hunter as Main Street, crosses the Kansas and Oklahoma Railroad, then turns west at 1st Street, crosses the railroad again and then exits Hunter.

From Hunter K-181 continues west through rural farmlands then turns north at 110 Road. The highway continues north for roughly seven miles (11 km) then turns west onto Buffalo Street on the south side of the city of Tipton. The highway leaves Tipton as West 160th Drive and continues west for a short distance, and then crosses into Osborne County. From the county line it continues roughly 2.2 miles (3.5 km) west, then turns north. K-181 continues north for approximately three miles (4.8 km), turns west for a short distance, then curves back north and becomes Levy Road. K-181 continues north as Levy Road for about eight miles (13 km) where it crosses the North Fork Solomon River. After crossing the river Levy Road turns east, and K-181 continues north and enters the city of Downs as Morgan Avenue. The roadway continues through Downs to the north side where it intersects US-24 and K-9, which is known as West 40th Drive. K-181 then continues north for four miles (6.4 km) and enters into Smith County. From the county line the road continues north through rural farmlands for about fifteen miles (24 km) and reaches its northern terminus at a diamond interchange with US-281 and US-36 just south of the city of Lebanon. K-181 continues north as US-281 north.

The Kansas Department of Transportation (KDOT) tracks the traffic levels on its highways, and in 2017, they determined that on average the traffic varied from 200 vehicles southwest of Sylvan Grove to 825 vehicles just north of the US-24 and K-9 intersection. K-181 is not included in the National Highway System, a system of highways important to the nation's defense, economy, and mobility. K-181 does connect to the National Highway System at its junction with US-24 and K-9, and at the intersection with US-36 and US-281.

== History ==
=== Early roads and designation ===
Before state highways were numbered in Kansas there were Auto trails, which were an informal network of marked routes that existed in the United States and Canada in the early part of the 20th century. The section of K-181 from the Solomon River north to Downs was part of the Roosevelt National Highway and Kansas White Way auto trails. A short section from Sylvan Grove southward was part of the Sunflower Trail. US-36 was part of the Pikes Peak Ocean to Ocean Highway and K-18 was part of the Blue Line auto trail. K-181 was first designated a state highway by KDOT, at the time State Highway Commission of Kansas, on January 7, 1937. When it was first designated it originally ran from US-24 in Downs northward and ended at US-36 and US-281 south of Lebanon.

=== Extensions and realignments ===
In separate State Highway Commission meetings in 1946, resolutions were adopted to extend K-181 from Downs south then east to the Osborne–Mitchell county line and then from that point east to Tipton then south past the Mitchell–Lincoln County line to K-18 as soon as Osborne, Mitchell and Lincoln Counties had finished required projects to bring the road up to state highway standards. By mid-1948, Osborne County had finished required projects, including improvements to the North Solomon River bridge, and the highway was officially extended from Downs to the Mitchell County line on October 13, 1948. Then by mid-1950, Mitchell County had completed required projects on the section from Osborne–Mitchell County line to Tipton, and that section became K-181 on August 10, 1950. Then by early 1952, Mitchell County had completed required projects on the section from Tipton south to the Lincoln County line, and that section became K-181 on March 26, 1952. Then by mid-1954, Lincoln County had completed required projects on the remaining section from the Mitchell–Lincoln County line south to K-18 in Sylvan Grove, and that section became K-181 on May 12, 1954.

In 1964, K-181 was extended from K-18 southward to the north end of the Saline River bridge. In 1972, it was extended from the Saline River bridge further southward then eastward 8.04 miles (12.94 km) to end at K-232. In 1991, K-181 was realigned slightly where the roadway crosses the South Branch Spillman Creek.

== Major intersections ==
County	Location	mi	km	Destinations	Notes
Russell	Fairview Township	0.000	0.000	K-232 (Post Rock Scenic Byway)	Southern terminus
Lincoln	Sylvan Grove	10.080	16.222	K-18 – Lucas, Lincoln	
Mitchell	No major junctions				
Osborne	Downs	51.025	82.117	US-24 / K-9 (West 40th Drive) – Osborne, Beloit	
Smith	Oak Township	70.218	113.005	US-36 / US-281 – Smith Center, Mankato, Lebanon	Northern terminus; diamond interchange
1.000 mi = 1.609 km; 1.000 km = 0.621 mi
