= Columbia Township, Kansas =

Columbia Township
- Township
- Location in Ellsworth County
- Coordinates: 38°49′38″N 098°19′06″W
- Country: United States
- State: Kansas
- County: Ellsworth

Area
  - Total: 36.32 sq mi (94.06 km^{2})
  - Land: 36.30 sq mi (94.02 km^{2})
  - Water: 0.015 sq mi (0.04 km^{2}) 0.04%
- Elevation: 1,670 ft (510 m)

Population (2020)
  - Total: 51
  - Density: 1.4/sq mi (0.54/km^{2})
- GNIS feature ID: 0475350

Columbia Township is a township in Ellsworth County, Kansas, United States. As of the 2020 census, its population was 51.

== Geography ==
Columbia Township covers an area of 36.32 square miles (94.1 km^{2}) and contains no incorporated settlements. According to the USGS, it contains two cemeteries: Fairview and Pleasant Valley.
