= Sherman Township, Ellsworth County, Kansas =

Sherman Township
- Township
- Location in Ellsworth County
- Coordinates: 38°49′37″N 098°12′22″W
- Country: United States
- State: Kansas
- County: Ellsworth

Area
  - Total: 36.47 sq mi (94.46 km^{2})
  - Land: 36.39 sq mi (94.25 km^{2})
  - Water: 0.081 sq mi (0.21 km^{2}) 0.22%
- Elevation: 1,740 ft (530 m)

Population (2020)
  - Total: 80
  - Density: 2.2/sq mi (0.85/km^{2})
- GNIS feature ID: 0475351

Sherman Township is a township in Ellsworth County, Kansas, United States. As of the 2020 census, its population was 80.

== Geography ==
Sherman Township covers an area of 36.47 square miles (94.5 km^{2}) and contains no incorporated settlements.
