= Wilson Township, Ellsworth County, Kansas =

Wilson Township
- Township
- Location in Ellsworth County
- Coordinates: 38°49′38″N 098°25′39″W
- Country: United States
- State: Kansas
- County: Ellsworth

Area
  - Total: 35.93 sq mi (93.07 km^{2})
  - Land: 35.92 sq mi (93.02 km^{2})
  - Water: 0.023 sq mi (0.06 km^{2}) 0.06%
- Elevation: 1,719 ft (524 m)

Population (2020)
  - Total: 932
  - Density: 25.9/sq mi (10.0/km^{2})
- GNIS ID: 0475341

Wilson Township is a township in Ellsworth County, Kansas, United States. As of the 2020 census, its population was 932.

== Geography ==
Wilson Township covers an area of 35.94 square miles (93.1 km^{2}) and contains one incorporated settlement, Wilson. According to the USGS, it contains two cemeteries: Wilson and Old Wilson.

The streams of Spring Creek and Wilson Creek run through this township.
