= Wilson Lake (Kansas) =

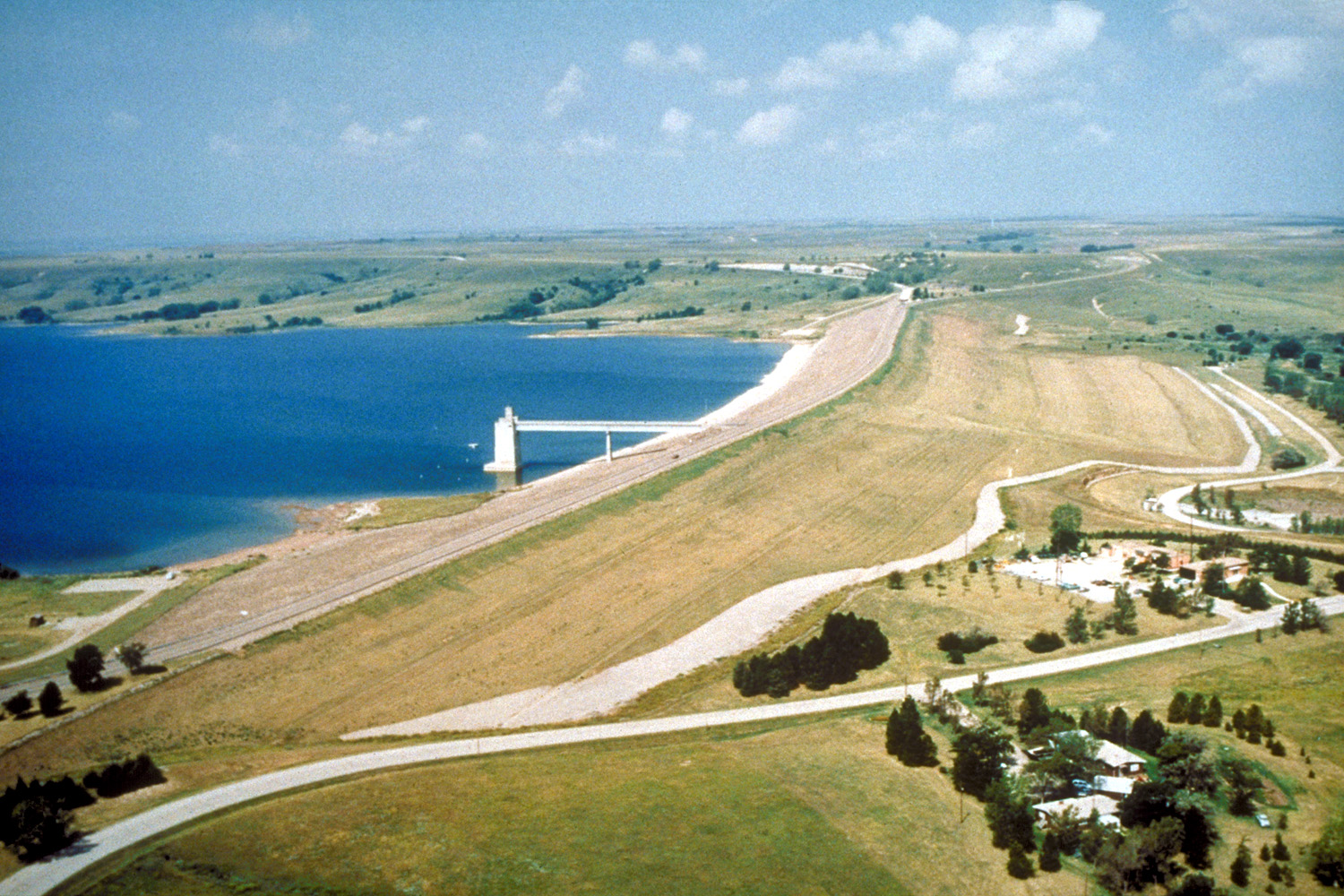
- Wilson Dam (1999)

- Location within Kansas Location within the United States

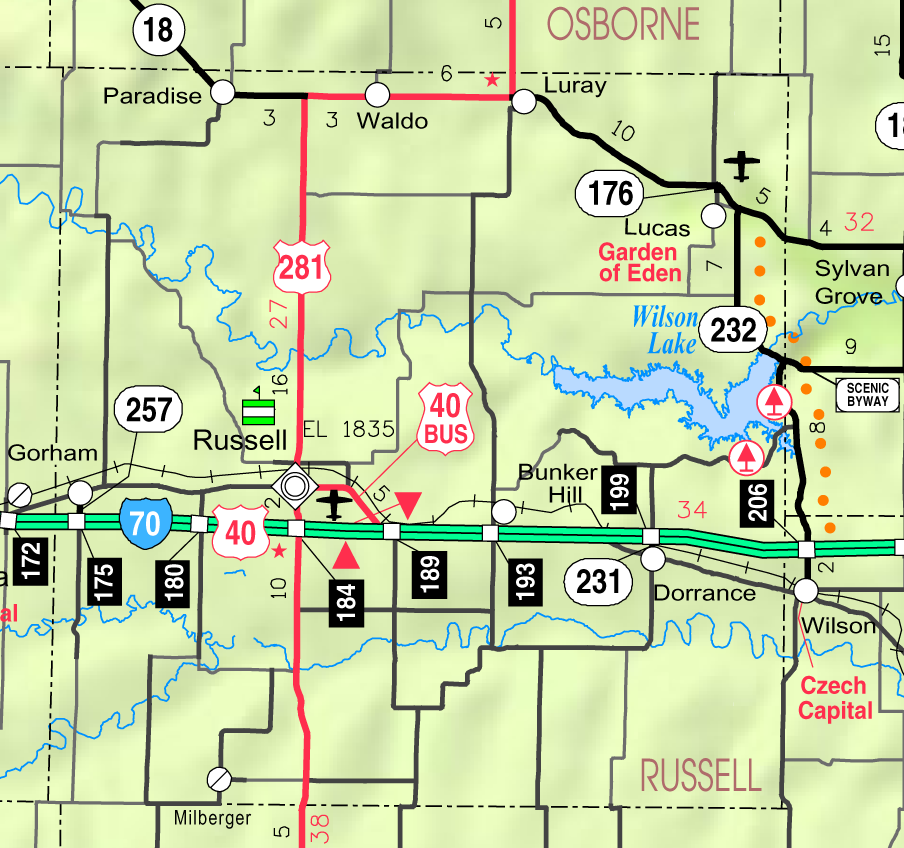
- KDOT map of Russell County (legend)
- Location: Russell and Lincoln counties in Kansas
- Coordinates: 38°56′25″N 98°33′24″W
- Type: Reservoir
- Primary inflows: Saline River
- Primary outflows: Saline River
- Catchment area: 1,917 sq mi (4,970 km^{2})
- Basin countries: United States
- Managing agency: U.S. Army Corps of Engineers
- Built: April 1961
- First flooded: December 29, 1964
- Max. length: 24 miles (39 km)
- Surface area: 9,045 acres (36.60 km^{2})
- Max. depth: 65 ft (20 m)
- Water volume: Full: 242,528 acre⋅ft (299,154,000 m^{3}); Current (Nov. 2015): 156,100 acre⋅ft (192,500,000 m^{3})
- Shore length^{1}: 100 mi (160 km)
- Surface elevation: Full: 1,516 ft (462 m); Current (May. 2019): 1,523 ft (464 m)
- Settlements: Dorrance, Lucas, Sylvan Grove, Wilson
- ^{1} Shore length is not a well-defined measure.

Wilson Lake is a reservoir in the U.S. state of Kansas, on the border of Russell County and Lincoln County. Built and managed by the U.S. Army Corps of Engineers for flood control, it is also used for wildlife management and recreation. Several parks are located along its shoreline, including Wilson State Park.

== History ==
The U.S. Bureau of Reclamation authorized construction of Wilson Lake for the purposes of irrigation, navigation enhancement, flood control, recreation, fish and wildlife habitat, and water quality assurance. However, the salinity of the water in the Saline River, which would feed the reservoir, made using it for irrigation unfeasible. The Bureau then turned over management and operation of the project to the U.S. Army Corps of Engineers. The Corps of Engineers planned, designed, and constructed Wilson Dam, completing it in 1964 at a cost of $20 million, and continues to manage the reservoir to the present day.

== Geography ==
Wilson Lake is located at 38°56′25″N 98°33′24″W (38.9401464, -98.5567638) at an elevation of 1,516 feet (462 m). It lies in north-central Kansas in the Smoky Hills region of the Great Plains. Most of Wilson Lake lies in Russell County with a small portion of its southeastern arm extending into Lincoln County.

The reservoir is impounded at its northeastern end by Wilson Dam. The dam is located at 38°58′00″N 98°29′41″W (38.9666777, -98.4947876) at an elevation of 1,588 feet (484 m). The Saline River is both the reservoir's primary inflow from the west and outflow to the east. Smaller tributaries include Elm Creek, which flows from the south into the western part of the reservoir, and Hell Creek, which feeds the reservoir's southeastern arm.

Kansas Highway 232 runs generally north–south along the reservoir's eastern shore and across the top of Wilson Dam. Shoreline Road, a paved county road, runs generally east–west parallel to the southern shore, crossing the reservoir's southeastern arm.

=== Climate ===
According to the Köppen Climate Classification system, has a humid subtropical climate, abbreviated "Cfa" on climate maps. The hottest temperature recorded at Wilson Lake was 111 °F (43.9 °C) on August 16, 1983, and June 21, 1988, while the coldest temperature recorded was −26 °F (−32.2 °C) on December 23, 1989.

Climate data for Wilson Lake, Kansas, 1991–2020 normals, extremes 1964–present
Month	Jan	Feb	Mar	Apr	May	Jun	Jul	Aug	Sep	Oct	Nov	Dec	Year
Record high °F (°C)	80 (27)	86 (30)	97 (36)	100 (38)	100 (38)	111 (44)	110 (43)	111 (44)	106 (41)	98 (37)	87 (31)	79 (26)	111 (44)
Mean maximum °F (°C)	66.1 (18.9)	70.5 (21.4)	79.8 (26.6)	87.7 (30.9)	92.5 (33.6)	98.8 (37.1)	103.3 (39.6)	101.3 (38.5)	96.9 (36.1)	89.6 (32.0)	76.2 (24.6)	64.8 (18.2)	104.2 (40.1)
Mean daily maximum °F (°C)	41.8 (5.4)	45.9 (7.7)	57.2 (14.0)	66.5 (19.2)	76.0 (24.4)	86.8 (30.4)	92.3 (33.5)	89.9 (32.2)	82.2 (27.9)	69.8 (21.0)	55.9 (13.3)	43.9 (6.6)	67.4 (19.6)
Daily mean °F (°C)	30.2 (−1.0)	33.6 (0.9)	43.8 (6.6)	53.1 (11.7)	63.8 (17.7)	74.6 (23.7)	79.8 (26.6)	77.5 (25.3)	69.1 (20.6)	56.3 (13.5)	43.3 (6.3)	33.0 (0.6)	54.8 (12.7)
Mean daily minimum °F (°C)	18.6 (−7.4)	21.3 (−5.9)	30.5 (−0.8)	39.7 (4.3)	51.5 (10.8)	62.5 (16.9)	67.3 (19.6)	65.1 (18.4)	56.1 (13.4)	42.7 (5.9)	30.7 (−0.7)	22.1 (−5.5)	42.3 (5.8)
Mean minimum °F (°C)	1.1 (−17.2)	4.4 (−15.3)	12.2 (−11.0)	24.0 (−4.4)	37.1 (2.8)	49.6 (9.8)	55.8 (13.2)	54.5 (12.5)	40.3 (4.6)	24.9 (−3.9)	13.9 (−10.1)	5.6 (−14.7)	−2.7 (−19.3)
Record low °F (°C)	−15 (−26)	−19 (−28)	−5 (−21)	12 (−11)	27 (−3)	38 (3)	46 (8)	45 (7)	28 (−2)	15 (−9)	−5 (−21)	−26 (−32)	−26 (−32)
Average precipitation inches (mm)	0.59 (15)	0.78 (20)	1.29 (33)	2.31 (59)	4.17 (106)	3.45 (88)	3.87 (98)	3.90 (99)	2.28 (58)	1.71 (43)	0.98 (25)	0.89 (23)	26.22 (667)
Average snowfall inches (cm)	1.8 (4.6)	3.7 (9.4)	0.7 (1.8)	0.4 (1.0)	0.0 (0.0)	0.0 (0.0)	0.0 (0.0)	0.0 (0.0)	0.0 (0.0)	0.1 (0.25)	0.4 (1.0)	2.5 (6.4)	9.6 (24.45)
Average extreme snow depth inches (cm)	2.3 (5.8)	3.7 (9.4)	1.0 (2.5)	0.4 (1.0)	0.0 (0.0)	0.0 (0.0)	0.0 (0.0)	0.0 (0.0)	0.0 (0.0)	0.0 (0.0)	0.4 (1.0)	1.9 (4.8)	5.0 (13)
Average precipitation days (≥ 0.01 in)	2.8	3.8	5.0	7.9	10.3	9.2	8.8	8.4	6.8	5.7	3.6	3.3	75.6
Average snowy days (≥ 0.1 in)	1.2	1.6	0.4	0.1	0.0	0.0	0.0	0.0	0.0	0.0	0.3	1.2	4.8
Source 1: NOAA
Source 2: National Weather Service

== Hydrography ==
The surface area, surface elevation, and water volume of the reservoir fluctuate based on inflow and local climatic conditions. In terms of capacity, the Corps of Engineers vertically divides the reservoir into a set of pools based on volume and water level, and the reservoir is considered full when filled to the capacity of its multi-purpose pool. When full, Wilson Lake has a surface area of 9,045 acres (36.60 km^{2}), a surface elevation of 1,516 feet (462 m), and a volume of 242,528 acre⋅ft (299,154,000 m^{3}). When filled to maximum capacity, it has a surface area of 33,882 acres (137.12 km^{2}), a surface elevation of 1,588 feet (484 m), and a volume of 1,666,995 acre⋅ft (2.056208×10^{9} m^{3}).

The streambed underlying the reservoir has an elevation of 1,420 feet (430 m). Since the reservoir's initial flooding, sedimentation has gradually accumulated on the reservoir bottom thus raising its elevation.

== Infrastructure ==
Wilson Dam is an earth-fill embankment dam with a foundation of rock and soil. It stands 130 feet (40 m) tall and 5,600 feet (1,700 m) long. At its crest, the dam has an elevation of 1,592 feet (485 m). An uncontrolled, 450-foot (140 m) spillway is located at the southeast end of the dam. The dam's outlet works consist of one gated conduit 12 feet (3.7 m) wide and 1,097 feet (334 m) long. When the reservoir is filled to maximum capacity, the spillway has a discharge capacity of 15,700 cubic feet per second (440 m^{3}/s). When it is filled to flood control capacity, the outlet works conduit has a discharge capacity of 6,500 cubic feet per second (180 m^{3}/s).

== Management ==
The Kansas City District of the U.S. Army Corps of Engineers manages Wilson Dam, Wilson Lake, and 13,000 acres (53 km^{2}) of land surrounding the reservoir for the purposes of flood control, recreation, fish and wildlife management, and downstream water quality improvement. Corps staff maintain the dam and outlet works, conduct dam safety inspections, and make water release changes to the Saline River outflow in accordance with the Kansas City Water District Control Section. They also provide visitor assistance, conduct park maintenance and patrolling, and perform wildlife food plot management. Operations such as trash removal, fee collection, and facility cleaning are outsourced to private contractors.

Of the land surrounding Wilson Lake, the Corps directly manages 3,200 acres (13 km^{2}) and has licensed the Kansas Department of Wildlife, Parks and Tourism (KDWP) to manage 8,069 acres (32.65 km^{2}) of native prairie and cropland as the Wilson Wildlife Area. Management activities include prescribed burning, tree and native grass plantings, invasive species control, and agricultural leases. Fisheries management activities include fish sampling and stocking, population monitoring, habitat work, and aquatic vegetation enhancement.

== Parks and recreation ==
The Corps of Engineers manages three parks at Wilson Lake: Lucas Park, Minooka Park, and Sylvan Park. Lucas Park is located on the north shore of the reservoir's eastern end and includes the Rocktown Natural Area. Minooka Park, named after the Otoe word for "good earth", lies on the south shore of the central part of the reservoir. Sylvan Park lies below Wilson Dam immediately northeast of the reservoir. Both Lucas Park and Minooka Park host swimming beaches and boat ramps. All three parks include hiking trails and camping facilities. The Corps of Engineers also operates a visitor center located below Wilson Dam near Sylvan Park.

The KDWP operates Wilson State Park located on the south shore of the reservoir's eastern end. The park is divided into two areas by the reservoir's southeastern arm: the Hell Creek Area on the west side and the Otoe Area on the east side. The Hell Creek Area hosts a marina. Both areas include hiking trails, swimming beaches, boat ramps, and camping facilities.

Wilson Lake is open to sport fishing. Hunting is permitted on the public land around the reservoir although it is restricted in certain areas.

=== Points of interest ===
Rocktown Natural Area is a site comprising 305 acres (1.23 km^{2}) in Lucas Park. It is named for the sandstone pillars, ranging in height from 15 feet (4.6 m) to 30 feet (9.1 m), that occupy its landscape. It is also home to a number of plant species uncommon to the region: Fremont's clematis, shortstem spiderwort, and Maryland senna among others.

Portions of the Dakota Formation are exposed in multiple locations around the reservoir. They contain extensive fossil material dating back to the Cretaceous period.

== Wildlife ==
Fish species resident in Wilson Lake include black bass, channel catfish, crappie, smallmouth bass, striped bass, walleye, and white bass. Two invasive species, the white perch and the zebra mussel, live in the lake as well. Game animals living on land around the reservoir include common pheasants, deer, ducks, geese, prairie chickens, quail, rabbits, and turkeys.

Part of the Wilson Wildlife Area at the far western end of the lake is home to a concentration of several native mixed grass prairie species: big bluestem, blue gramma, buffalo grass, Indian grass, little bluestem, sideoats gramma, and switchgrass.

== Gallery ==
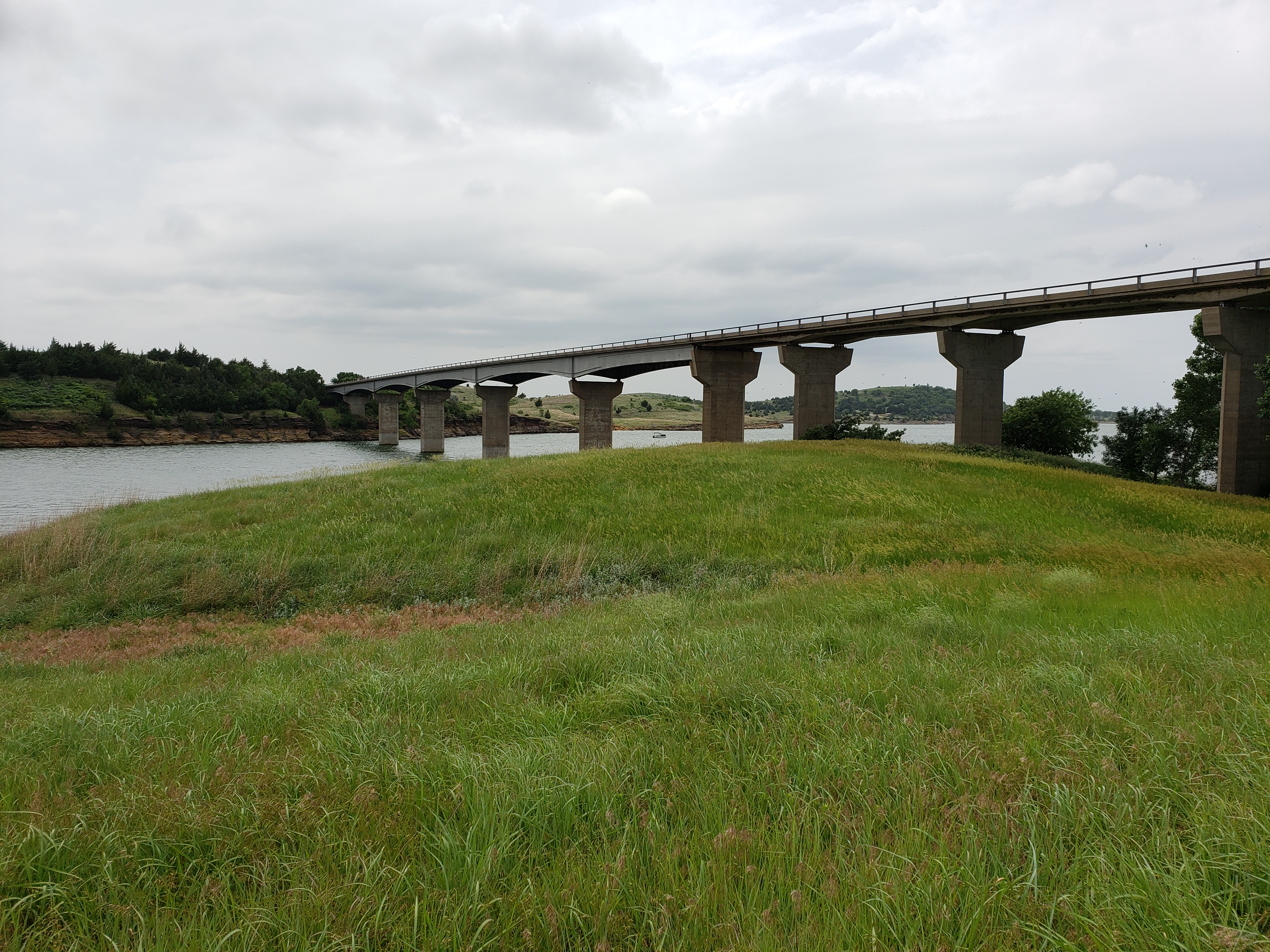
Hell Creek Bridge (2021)

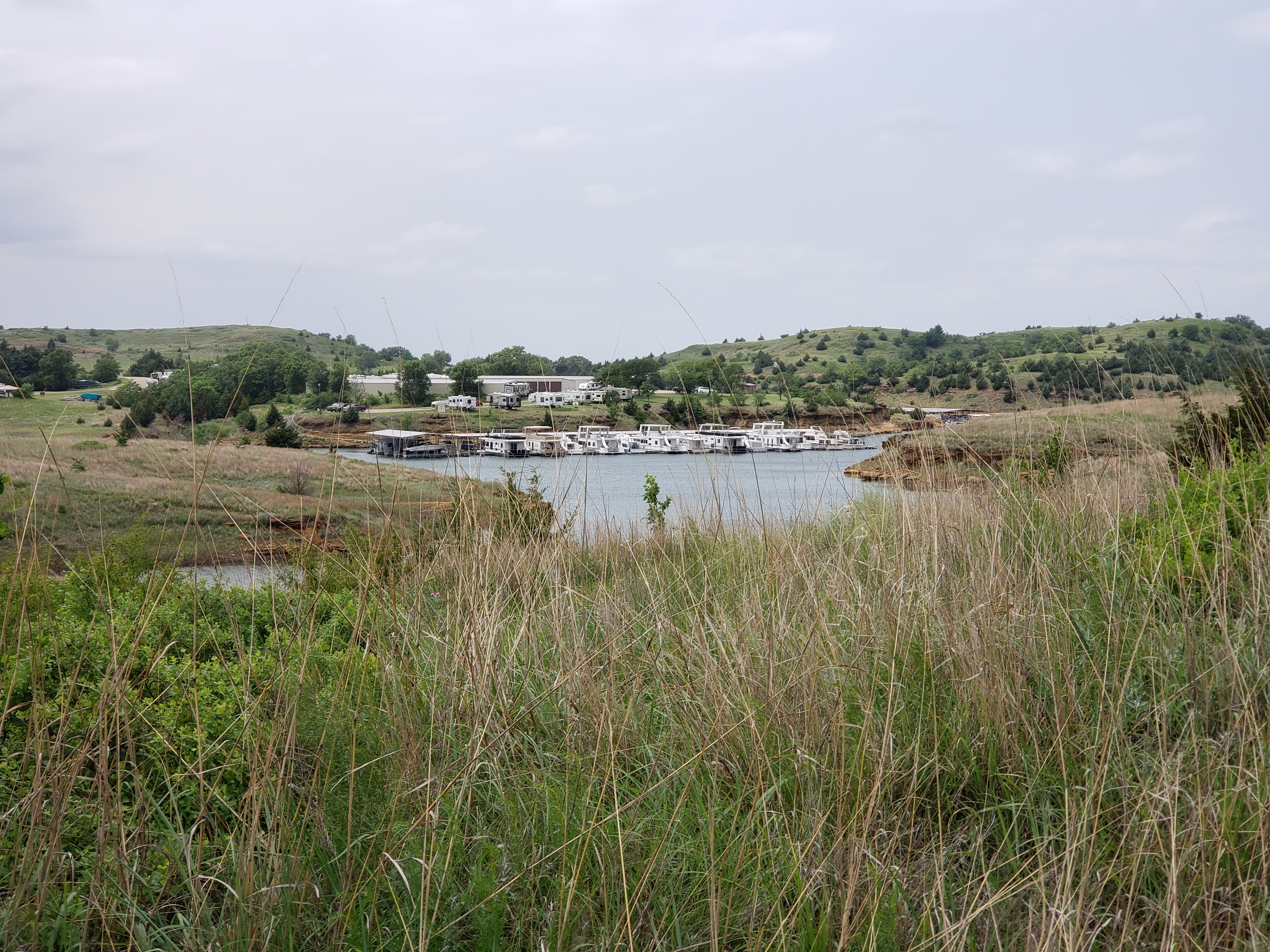
Lake Wilson Marina (2021)

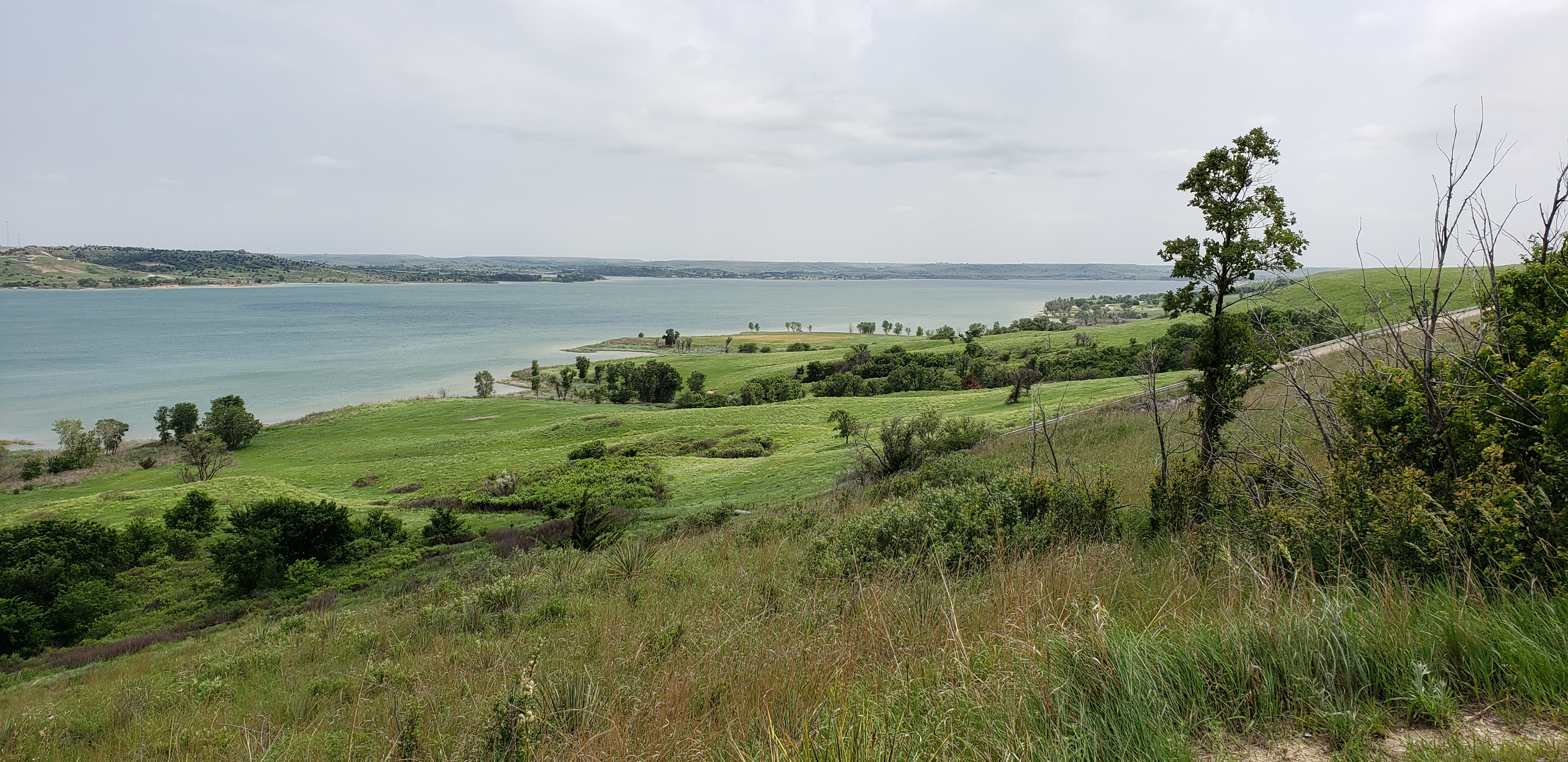
Lucas Park (2021)

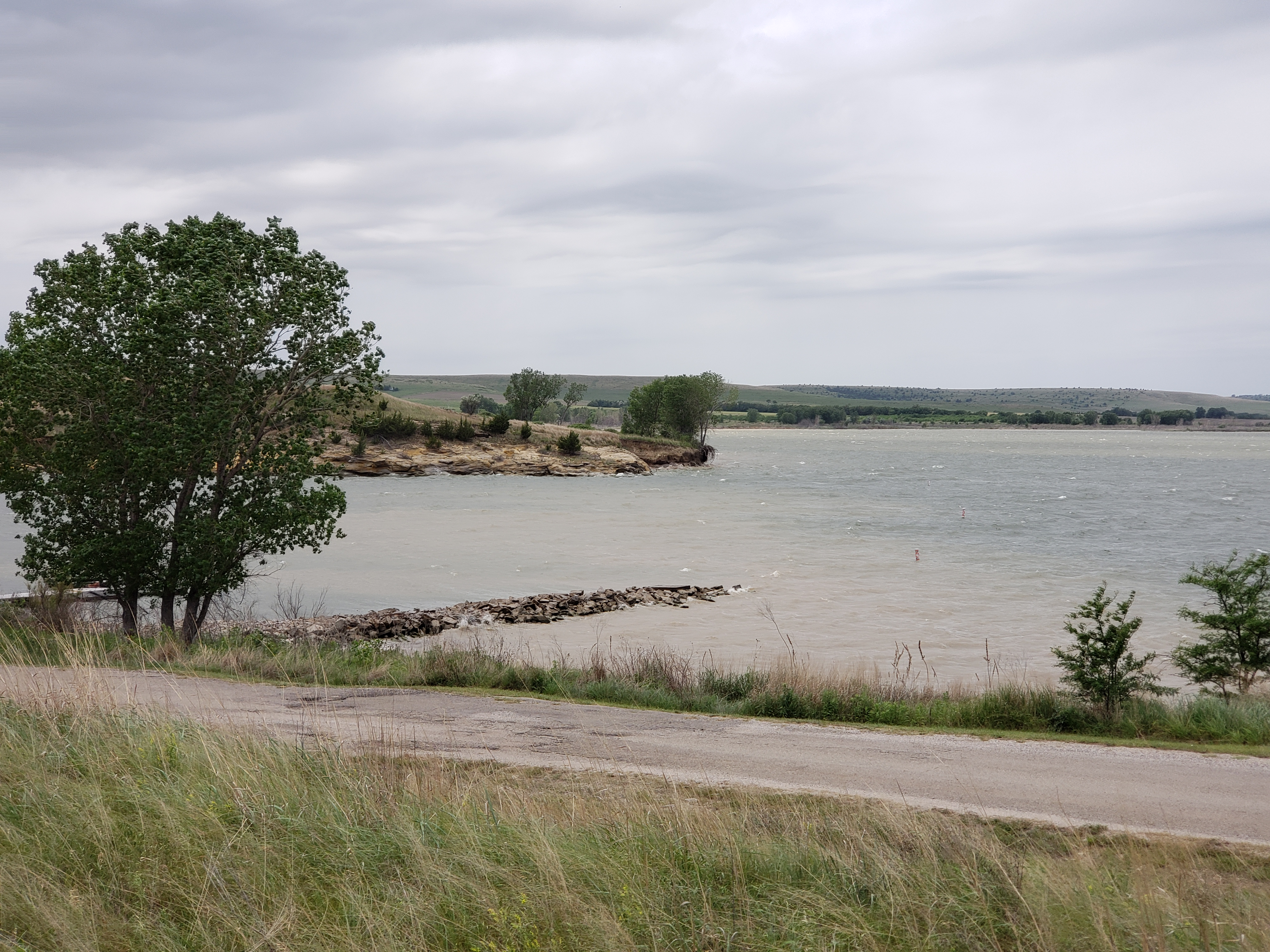
Westward lake view from Minooka Park (2021)

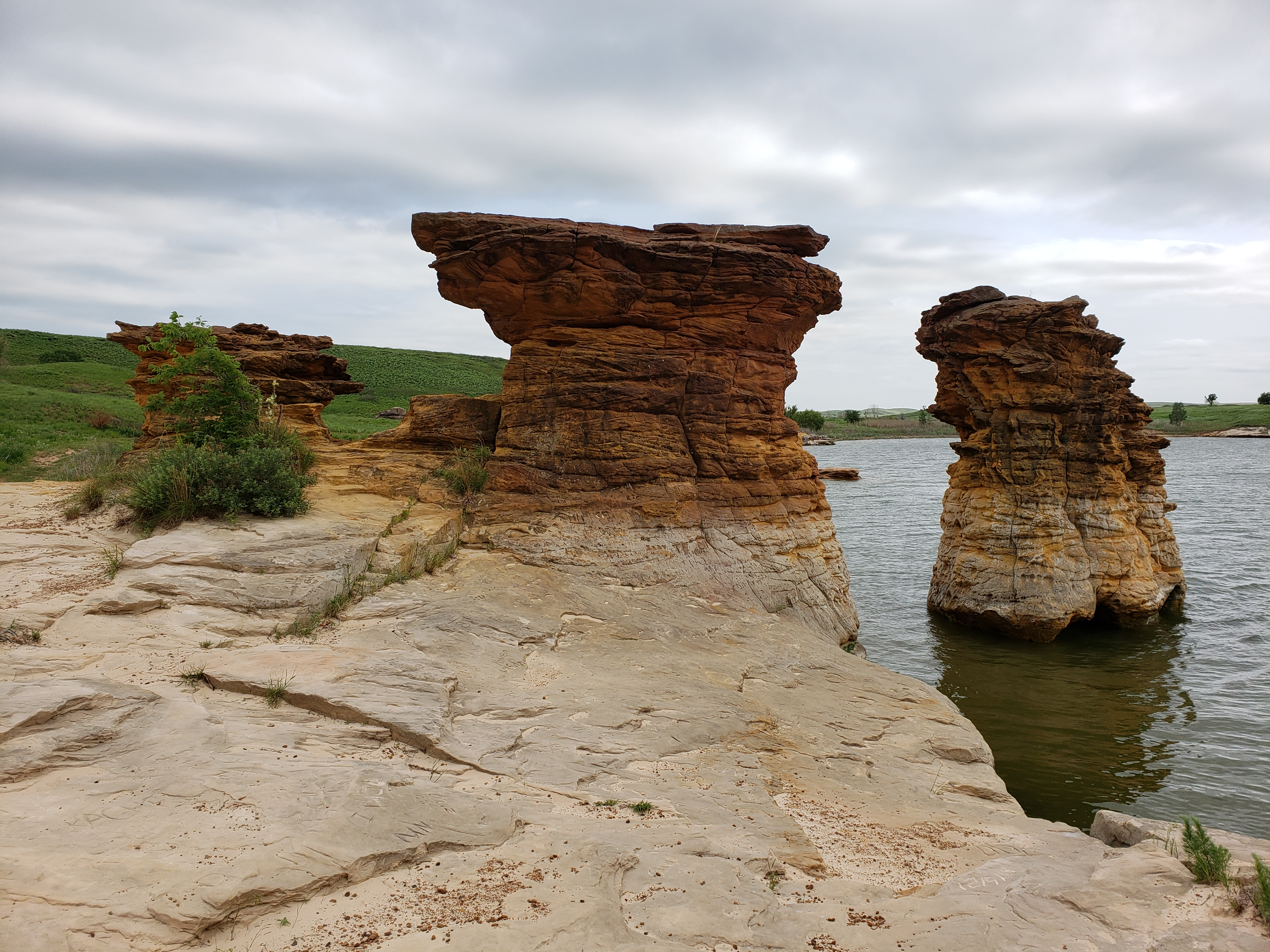
Rocktown Natural Area (2021)

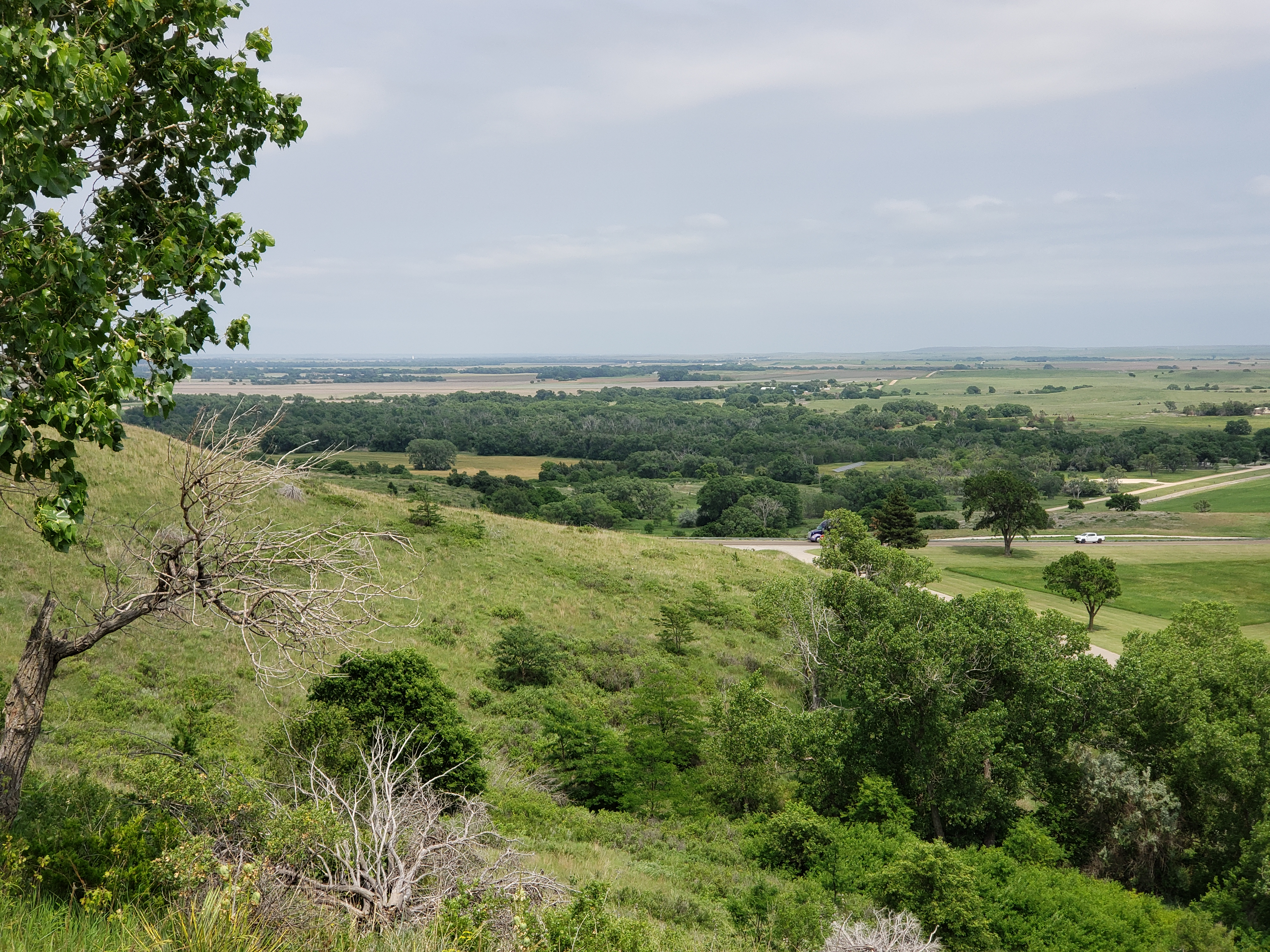
Sylvan Park (2021)

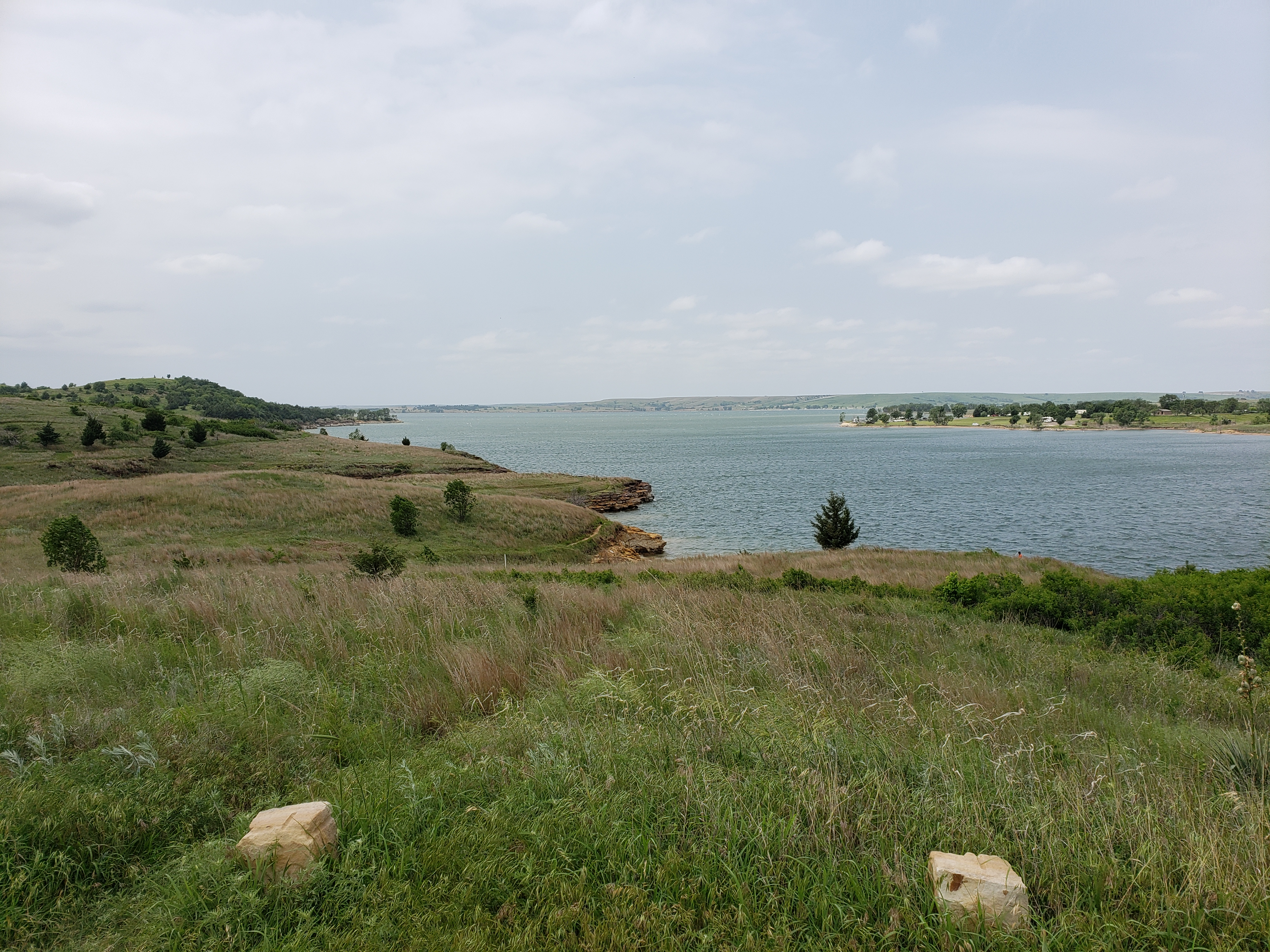
Wilson State Park - Hell Creek Area (foreground) and Otoe Area (background right) (2021)

== See also ==
- List of Kansas state parks
- List of lakes, reservoirs, and dams in Kansas
- List of rivers of Kansas
