= List of townships in Kansas =

Kansas townships
- Map of the townships in Kansas
- Category: Lower-level administrative division
- Location: Kansas
- Created by: Kansas–Nebraska Act
- Created: July 22, 1854
- Number: 1,395
- Populations: 5 (Aetna Township) – 23,462 (Rockford Township)
- Areas: 17 square miles (44 km^{2}) (Minneha Township) – 431.1 square miles (1,117 km^{2}) (Garfield Township)
- Government: Township government

Map of the United States with Kansas highlighted

The U.S. state of Kansas is divided into 1,395 townships in 105 counties.

Township	County
Carlyle Township	Allen County
Cottage Grove Township	Allen County
Deer Creek Township	Allen County
Elm Township	Allen County
Elsmore Township	Allen County
Geneva Township	Allen County
Humboldt Township	Allen County
Iola Township	Allen County
Logan Township	Allen County
Marmaton Township	Allen County
Osage Township	Allen County
Salem Township	Allen County
Indian Creek Township	Anderson County
Jackson Township	Anderson County
Lincoln Township	Anderson County
Lone Elm Township	Anderson County
Monroe Township	Anderson County
Ozark Township	Anderson County
Putnam Township	Anderson County
Reeder Township	Anderson County
Rich Township	Anderson County
Walker Township	Anderson County
Washington Township	Anderson County
Welda Township	Anderson County
Westphalia Township	Anderson County
Benton Township	Atchison County
Center Township	Atchison County
Grasshopper Township	Atchison County
Kapioma Township	Atchison County
Lancaster Township	Atchison County
Mount Pleasant Township	Atchison County
Shannon Township	Atchison County
Walnut Township	Atchison County
Aetna Township	Barber County
Deerhead Township	Barber County
Eagle Township	Barber County
Elm Mills Township	Barber County
Elwood Township	Barber County
Hazelton Township	Barber County
Kiowa Township	Barber County
Lake City Township	Barber County
McAdoo Township	Barber County
Medicine Lodge Township	Barber County
Mingona Township	Barber County
Moore Township	Barber County
Nippawalla Township	Barber County
Sharon Township	Barber County
Sun City Township	Barber County
Turkey Creek Township	Barber County
Valley Township	Barber County
Albion Township	Barton County
Beaver Township	Barton County
Buffalo Township	Barton County
Cheyenne Township	Barton County
Clarence Township	Barton County
Cleveland Township	Barton County
Comanche Township	Barton County
Eureka Township	Barton County
Fairview Township	Barton County
Grant Township	Barton County
Great Bend Township	Barton County
Independent Township	Barton County
Lakin Township	Barton County
Liberty Township	Barton County
Logan Township	Barton County
North Homestead Township	Barton County
Pawnee Rock Township	Barton County
South Bend Township	Barton County
South Homestead Township	Barton County
Union Township	Barton County
Walnut Township	Barton County
Wheatland Township	Barton County
Drywood Township	Bourbon County
Franklin Township	Bourbon County
Freedom Township	Bourbon County
Marion Township	Bourbon County
Marmaton Township	Bourbon County
Mill Creek Township	Bourbon County
Osage Township	Bourbon County
Pawnee Township	Bourbon County
Scott Township	Bourbon County
Timberhill Township	Bourbon County
Walnut Township	Bourbon County
Hamlin Township	Brown County
Hiawatha Township	Brown County
Irving Township	Brown County
Mission Township	Brown County
Morrill Township	Brown County
Padonia Township	Brown County
Powhattan Township	Brown County
Robinson Township	Brown County
Walnut Township	Brown County
Washington Township	Brown County
Augusta Township	Butler County
Benton Township	Butler County
Bloomington Township	Butler County
Bruno Township	Butler County
Chelsea Township	Butler County
Clay Township	Butler County
Clifford Township	Butler County
Douglass Township	Butler County
El Dorado Township	Butler County
Fairmount Township	Butler County
Fairview Township	Butler County
Glencoe Township	Butler County
Hickory Township	Butler County
Lincoln Township	Butler County
Little Walnut Township	Butler County
Logan Township	Butler County
Milton Township	Butler County
Murdock Township	Butler County
Pleasant Township	Butler County
Plum Grove Township	Butler County
Prospect Township	Butler County
Richland Township	Butler County
Rock Creek Township	Butler County
Rosalia Township	Butler County
Spring Township	Butler County
Sycamore Township	Butler County
Towanda Township	Butler County
Union Township	Butler County
Walnut Township	Butler County
Bazaar Township	Chase County
Cedar Township	Chase County
Cottonwood Township	Chase County
Diamond Creek Township	Chase County
Falls Township	Chase County
Homestead Township	Chase County
Matfield Township	Chase County
Strong Township	Chase County
Toledo Township	Chase County
Belleville Township	Chautauqua County
Caneyville Township	Chautauqua County
Center Township	Chautauqua County
Harrison Township	Chautauqua County
Hendricks Township	Chautauqua County
Jefferson Township	Chautauqua County
Lafayette Township	Chautauqua County
Little Caney Township	Chautauqua County
Salt Creek Township	Chautauqua County
Sedan Township	Chautauqua County
Summit Township	Chautauqua County
Washington Township	Chautauqua County
Cherokee Township	Cherokee County
Crawford Township	Cherokee County
Garden Township	Cherokee County
Lola Township	Cherokee County
Lowell Township	Cherokee County
Lyon Township	Cherokee County
Mineral Township	Cherokee County
Neosho Township	Cherokee County
Pleasant View Township	Cherokee County
Ross Township	Cherokee County
Salamanca Township	Cherokee County
Shawnee Township	Cherokee County
Sheridan Township	Cherokee County
Spring Valley Township	Cherokee County
Benkelman Township	Cheyenne County
Bird City Township	Cheyenne County
Calhoun Township	Cheyenne County
Cleveland Run Township	Cheyenne County
Jaqua Township	Cheyenne County
Orlando Township	Cheyenne County
Wano Township	Cheyenne County
Appleton Township	Clark County
Center Township	Clark County
Englewood Township	Clark County
Lexington Township	Clark County
Liberty Township	Clark County
Sitka Township	Clark County
Athelstane Township	Clay County
Blaine Township	Clay County
Bloom Township	Clay County
Chapman Township	Clay County
Clay Center Township	Clay County
Exeter Township	Clay County
Five Creeks Township	Clay County
Garfield Township	Clay County
Gill Township	Clay County
Goshen Township	Clay County
Grant Township	Clay County
Hayes Township	Clay County
Highland Township	Clay County
Mulberry Township	Clay County
Oakland Township	Clay County
Republican Township	Clay County
Sherman Township	Clay County
Union Township	Clay County
Arion Township	Cloud County
Aurora Township	Cloud County
Buffalo Township	Cloud County
Center Township	Cloud County
Colfax Township	Cloud County
Elk Township	Cloud County
Grant Township	Cloud County
Lawrence Township	Cloud County
Lincoln Township	Cloud County
Lyon Township	Cloud County
Meredith Township	Cloud County
Nelson Township	Cloud County
Oakland Township	Cloud County
Shirley Township	Cloud County
Sibley Township	Cloud County
Solomon Township	Cloud County
Starr Township	Cloud County
Summit Township	Cloud County
Avon Township	Coffey County
Burlington Township	Coffey County
Hampden Township	Coffey County
Key West Township	Coffey County
Le Roy Township	Coffey County
Liberty Township	Coffey County
Lincoln Township	Coffey County
Neosho Township	Coffey County
Ottumwa Township	Coffey County
Pleasant Township	Coffey County
Pottawatomie Township	Coffey County
Rock Creek Township	Coffey County
Spring Creek Township	Coffey County
Star Township	Coffey County
Avilla Township	Comanche County
Coldwater Township	Comanche County
Powell Township	Comanche County
Protection Township	Comanche County
Beaver Township	Cowley County
Bolton Township	Cowley County
Cedar Township	Cowley County
Creswell Township	Cowley County
Dexter Township	Cowley County
Fairview Township	Cowley County
Grant Township	Cowley County
Harvey Township	Cowley County
Liberty Township	Cowley County
Maple Township	Cowley County
Ninnescah Township	Cowley County
Omnia Township	Cowley County
Otter Township	Cowley County
Pleasant Valley Township	Cowley County
Richland Township	Cowley County
Rock Creek Township	Cowley County
Salem Township	Cowley County
Sheridan Township	Cowley County
Silver Creek Township	Cowley County
Silverdale Township	Cowley County
Spring Creek Township	Cowley County
Tisdale Township	Cowley County
Vernon Township	Cowley County
Walnut Township	Cowley County
Windsor Township	Cowley County
Baker Township	Crawford County
Crawford Township	Crawford County
Grant Township	Crawford County
Lincoln Township	Crawford County
Osage Township	Crawford County
Sheridan Township	Crawford County
Sherman Township	Crawford County
Walnut Township	Crawford County
Washington Township	Crawford County
Allison Township	Decatur County
Altory Township	Decatur County
Bassettville Township	Decatur County
Beaver Township	Decatur County
Center Township	Decatur County
Cook Township	Decatur County
Custer Township	Decatur County
Dresden Township	Decatur County
Finley Township	Decatur County
Garfield Township	Decatur County
Grant Township	Decatur County
Harlan Township	Decatur County
Jennings Township	Decatur County
Liberty Township	Decatur County
Lincoln Township	Decatur County
Logan Township	Decatur County
Lyon Township	Decatur County
Oberlin Township	Decatur County
Olive Township	Decatur County
Pleasant Valley Township	Decatur County
Prairie Dog Township	Decatur County
Roosevelt Township	Decatur County
Sappa Township	Decatur County
Sherman Township	Decatur County
Summit Township	Decatur County
Banner Township	Dickinson County
Buckeye Township	Dickinson County
Center Township	Dickinson County
Cheever Township	Dickinson County
Flora Township	Dickinson County
Fragrant Hill Township	Dickinson County
Garfield Township	Dickinson County
Grant Township	Dickinson County
Hayes Township	Dickinson County
Holland Township	Dickinson County
Hope Township	Dickinson County
Jefferson Township	Dickinson County
Liberty Township	Dickinson County
Lincoln Township	Dickinson County
Logan Township	Dickinson County
Lyon Township	Dickinson County
Newbern Township	Dickinson County
Noble Township	Dickinson County
Ridge Township	Dickinson County
Rinehart Township	Dickinson County
Sherman Township	Dickinson County
Union Township	Dickinson County
Wheatland Township	Dickinson County
Willowdale Township	Dickinson County
Burr Oak Township	Doniphan County
Center Township	Doniphan County
Independence Township	Doniphan County
Iowa Township	Doniphan County
Marion Township	Doniphan County
Union Township	Doniphan County
Washington Township	Doniphan County
Wayne Township	Doniphan County
Wolf River Township	Doniphan County
Clinton Township	Douglas County
Eudora Township	Douglas County
Grant Township	Douglas County
Kanwaka Township	Douglas County
Lecompton Township	Douglas County
Marion Township	Douglas County
Palmyra Township	Douglas County
Wakarusa Township	Douglas County
Willow Springs Township	Douglas County
Belpre Township	Edwards County
Franklin Township	Edwards County
Jackson Township	Edwards County
Kinsley Township	Edwards County
Lincoln Township	Edwards County
Logan Township	Edwards County
North Brown Township	Edwards County
South Brown Township	Edwards County
Trenton Township	Edwards County
Wayne Township	Edwards County
Elk Falls Township	Elk County
Greenfield Township	Elk County
Howard Township	Elk County
Liberty Township	Elk County
Longton Township	Elk County
Oak Valley Township	Elk County
Painterhood Township	Elk County
Paw Paw Township	Elk County
Union Center Township	Elk County
Wild Cat Township	Elk County
Big Creek Township	Ellis County
Buckeye Township	Ellis County
Freedom Township	Ellis County
Herzog Township	Ellis County
Ash Creek Township	Ellsworth County
Black Wolf Township	Ellsworth County
Carneiro Township	Ellsworth County
Clear Creek Township	Ellsworth County
Columbia Township	Ellsworth County
Ellsworth Township	Ellsworth County
Empire Township	Ellsworth County
Garfield Township	Ellsworth County
Green Garden Township	Ellsworth County
Langley Township	Ellsworth County
Lincoln Township	Ellsworth County
Mulberry Township	Ellsworth County
Noble Township	Ellsworth County
Palacky Township	Ellsworth County
Sherman Township	Ellsworth County
Thomas Township	Ellsworth County
Trivoli Township	Ellsworth County
Valley Township	Ellsworth County
Wilson Township	Ellsworth County
Garden City Township	Finney County
Garfield Township	Finney County
Ivanhoe Township	Finney County
Pierceville Township	Finney County
Pleasant Valley Township	Finney County
Sherlock Township	Finney County
Terry Township	Finney County
Bloom Township	Ford County
Bucklin Township	Ford County
Concord Township	Ford County
Dodge Township	Ford County
Enterprise Township	Ford County
Fairview Township	Ford County
Ford Township	Ford County
Grandview Township	Ford County
Richland Township	Ford County
Royal Township	Ford County
Sodville Township	Ford County
Spearville Township	Ford County
Wheatland Township	Ford County
Wilburn Township	Ford County
Appanoose Township	Franklin County
Centropolis Township	Franklin County
Cutler Township	Franklin County
Franklin Township	Franklin County
Greenwood Township	Franklin County
Harrison Township	Franklin County
Hayes Township	Franklin County
Homewood Township	Franklin County
Lincoln Township	Franklin County
Ohio Township	Franklin County
Ottawa Township	Franklin County
Peoria Township	Franklin County
Pomona Township	Franklin County
Pottawatomie Township	Franklin County
Richmond Township	Franklin County
Williamsburg Township	Franklin County
Blakely Township	Geary County
Jackson Township	Geary County
Jefferson Township	Geary County
Liberty Township	Geary County
Lyon Township	Geary County
Milford Township	Geary County
Smoky Hill Township	Geary County
Wingfield Township	Geary County
Baker Township	Gove County
Gaeland Township	Gove County
Gove Township	Gove County
Grainfield Township	Gove County
Grinnell Township	Gove County
Jerome Township	Gove County
Larrabee Township	Gove County
Lewis Township	Gove County
Payne Township	Gove County
Allodium Township	Graham County
Bryant Township	Graham County
Gettysburg Township	Graham County
Graham Township	Graham County
Happy Township	Graham County
Hill City Township	Graham County
Indiana Township	Graham County
Millbrook Township	Graham County
Morlan Township	Graham County
Nicodemus Township	Graham County
Pioneer Township	Graham County
Solomon Township	Graham County
Wildhorse Township	Graham County
Lincoln Township	Grant County
Sherman Township	Grant County
Sullivan Township	Grant County
Cimarron Township	Gray County
Copeland Township	Gray County
East Hess Township	Gray County
Foote Township	Gray County
Ingalls Township	Gray County
Logan Township	Gray County
Montezuma Township	Gray County
Tribune Township	Greeley County
Bachelor Township	Greenwood County
Eureka Township	Greenwood County
Fall River Township	Greenwood County
Janesville Township	Greenwood County
Lane Township	Greenwood County
Madison Township	Greenwood County
Otter Creek Township	Greenwood County
Pleasant Grove Township	Greenwood County
Quincy Township	Greenwood County
Salem Township	Greenwood County
Salt Springs Township	Greenwood County
Shell Rock Township	Greenwood County
South Salem Township	Greenwood County
Spring Creek Township	Greenwood County
Twin Grove Township	Greenwood County
Bear Creek Township	Hamilton County
Coolidge Township	Hamilton County
Kendall Township	Hamilton County
Lamont Township	Hamilton County
Liberty Township	Hamilton County
Medway Township	Hamilton County
Richland Township	Hamilton County
Syracuse Township	Hamilton County
Township 1	Harper County
Township 2	Harper County
Township 3	Harper County
Township 4	Harper County
Township 5	Harper County
Township 6	Harper County
Alta Township	Harvey County
Burrton Township	Harvey County
Darlington Township	Harvey County
Emma Township	Harvey County
Garden Township	Harvey County
Halstead Township	Harvey County
Highland Township	Harvey County
Lake Township	Harvey County
Lakin Township	Harvey County
Macon Township	Harvey County
Newton Township	Harvey County
Pleasant Township	Harvey County
Richland Township	Harvey County
Sedgwick Township	Harvey County
Walton Township	Harvey County
Dudley Township	Haskell County
Haskell Township	Haskell County
Lockport Township	Haskell County
Benton Township	Hodgeman County
Center Township	Hodgeman County
Hallet Township	Hodgeman County
Marena Township	Hodgeman County
North Roscoe Township	Hodgeman County
Sawlog Township	Hodgeman County
South Roscoe Township	Hodgeman County
Sterling Township	Hodgeman County
Valley Township	Hodgeman County
Adrian Township	Jackson County
Banner Township	Jackson County
Cedar Township	Jackson County
Douglas Township	Jackson County
Franklin Township	Jackson County
Garfield Township	Jackson County
Grant Township	Jackson County
Jefferson Township	Jackson County
Liberty Township	Jackson County
Lincoln Township	Jackson County
Netawaka Township	Jackson County
Soldier Township	Jackson County
Straight Creek Township	Jackson County
Washington Township	Jackson County
Whiting Township	Jackson County
Delaware Township	Jefferson County
Fairview Township	Jefferson County
Jefferson Township	Jefferson County
Kaw Township	Jefferson County
Kentucky Township	Jefferson County
Norton Township	Jefferson County
Oskaloosa Township	Jefferson County
Ozawkie Township	Jefferson County
Rock Creek Township	Jefferson County
Rural Township	Jefferson County
Sarcoxie Township	Jefferson County
Union Township	Jefferson County
Allen Township	Jewell County
Athens Township	Jewell County
Browns Creek Township	Jewell County
Buffalo Township	Jewell County
Burr Oak Township	Jewell County
Calvin Township	Jewell County
Center Township	Jewell County
Erving Township	Jewell County
Esbon Township	Jewell County
Grant Township	Jewell County
Harrison Township	Jewell County
Highland Township	Jewell County
Holmwood Township	Jewell County
Ionia Township	Jewell County
Jackson Township	Jewell County
Limestone Township	Jewell County
Montana Township	Jewell County
Odessa Township	Jewell County
Prairie Township	Jewell County
Richland Township	Jewell County
Sinclair Township	Jewell County
Vicksburg Township	Jewell County
Walnut Township	Jewell County
Washington Township	Jewell County
White Mound Township	Jewell County
Aubry Township	Johnson County
Gardner Township	Johnson County
Lexington Township	Johnson County
McCamish Township	Johnson County
Olathe Township	Johnson County
Oxford Township	Johnson County
Spring Hill Township	Johnson County
Deerfield Township	Kearny County
East Hibbard Township	Kearny County
Hartland Township	Kearny County
Kendall Township	Kearny County
Lakin Township	Kearny County
Southside Township	Kearny County
West Hibbard Township	Kearny County
Allen Township	Kingman County
Belmont Township	Kingman County
Bennett Township	Kingman County
Canton Township	Kingman County
Chikaskia Township	Kingman County
Dale Township	Kingman County
Dresden Township	Kingman County
Eagle Township	Kingman County
Eureka Township	Kingman County
Evan Township	Kingman County
Galesburg Township	Kingman County
Hoosier Township	Kingman County
Kingman Township	Kingman County
Liberty Township	Kingman County
Ninnescah Township	Kingman County
Peters Township	Kingman County
Richland Township	Kingman County
Rochester Township	Kingman County
Rural Township	Kingman County
Union Township	Kingman County
Valley Township	Kingman County
Vinita Township	Kingman County
White Township	Kingman County
Kiowa Rural Township	Kiowa County
Canada Township	Labette County
Elm Grove Township	Labette County
Fairview Township	Labette County
Hackberry Township	Labette County
Howard Township	Labette County
Labette Township	Labette County
Liberty Township	Labette County
Montana Township	Labette County
Mound Valley Township	Labette County
Mount Pleasant Township	Labette County
Neosho Township	Labette County
North Township	Labette County
Osage Township	Labette County
Oswego Township	Labette County
Richland Township	Labette County
Walton Township	Labette County
Alamota Township	Lane County
Cheyenne Township	Lane County
Dighton Township	Lane County
White Rock Township	Lane County
Wilson Township	Lane County
Alexandria Township	Leavenworth County
Delaware Township	Leavenworth County
Easton Township	Leavenworth County
Fairmount Township	Leavenworth County
High Prairie Township	Leavenworth County
Kickapoo Township	Leavenworth County
Reno Township	Leavenworth County
Sherman Township	Leavenworth County
Stranger Township	Leavenworth County
Tonganoxie Township	Leavenworth County
Battle Creek Township	Lincoln County
Beaver Township	Lincoln County
Cedron Township	Lincoln County
Colorado Township	Lincoln County
Elkhorn Township	Lincoln County
Franklin Township	Lincoln County
Golden Belt Township	Lincoln County
Grant Township	Lincoln County
Hanover Township	Lincoln County
Highland Township	Lincoln County
Indiana Township	Lincoln County
Logan Township	Lincoln County
Madison Township	Lincoln County
Marion Township	Lincoln County
Orange Township	Lincoln County
Pleasant Township	Lincoln County
Salt Creek Township	Lincoln County
Scott Township	Lincoln County
Valley Township	Lincoln County
Vesper Township	Lincoln County
Blue Mound Township	Linn County
Centerville Township	Linn County
Liberty Township	Linn County
Lincoln Township	Linn County
Mound City Township	Linn County
Paris Township	Linn County
Potosi Township	Linn County
Scott Township	Linn County
Sheridan Township	Linn County
Stanton Township	Linn County
Valley Township	Linn County
Augustine Township	Logan County
Elkader Township	Logan County
Lees Township	Logan County
Logansport Township	Logan County
McAllaster Township	Logan County
Monument Township	Logan County
Oakley Township	Logan County
Paxton Township	Logan County
Russell Springs Township	Logan County
Western Township	Logan County
Winona Township	Logan County
Agnes City Township	Lyon County
Americus Township	Lyon County
Center Township	Lyon County
Elmendaro Township	Lyon County
Emporia Township	Lyon County
Fremont Township	Lyon County
Ivy Township	Lyon County
Jackson Township	Lyon County
Pike Township	Lyon County
Reading Township	Lyon County
Waterloo Township	Lyon County
Battle Hill Township	McPherson County
Bonaville Township	McPherson County
Canton Township	McPherson County
Castle Township	McPherson County
Delmore Township	McPherson County
Empire Township	McPherson County
Groveland Township	McPherson County
Gypsum Creek Township	McPherson County
Harper Township	McPherson County
Hayes Township	McPherson County
Jackson Township	McPherson County
King City Township	McPherson County
Little Valley Township	McPherson County
Lone Tree Township	McPherson County
Marquette Township	McPherson County
McPherson Township	McPherson County
Meridian Township	McPherson County
Mound Township	McPherson County
New Gottland Township	McPherson County
Smoky Hill Township	McPherson County
South Sharps Creek Township	McPherson County
Spring Valley Township	McPherson County
Superior Township	McPherson County
Turkey Creek Township	McPherson County
Union Township	McPherson County
Blaine Township	Marion County
Catlin Township	Marion County
Centre Township	Marion County
Clark Township	Marion County
Clear Creek Township	Marion County
Colfax Township	Marion County
Doyle Township	Marion County
Durham Park Township	Marion County
East Branch Township	Marion County
Fairplay Township	Marion County
Gale Township	Marion County
Grant Township	Marion County
Lehigh Township	Marion County
Liberty Township	Marion County
Logan Township	Marion County
Lost Springs Township	Marion County
Menno Township	Marion County
Milton Township	Marion County
Moore Township	Marion County
Peabody Township	Marion County
Risley Township	Marion County
Summit Township	Marion County
West Branch Township	Marion County
Wilson Township	Marion County
Balderson Township	Marshall County
Bigelow Township	Marshall County
Blue Rapids City Township	Marshall County
Blue Rapids Township	Marshall County
Center Township	Marshall County
Clear Fork Township	Marshall County
Cleveland Township	Marshall County
Cottage Hill Township	Marshall County
Elm Creek Township	Marshall County
Franklin Township	Marshall County
Guittard Township	Marshall County
Herkimer Township	Marshall County
Lincoln Township	Marshall County
Logan Township	Marshall County
Marysville Township	Marshall County
Murray Township	Marshall County
Noble Township	Marshall County
Oketo Township	Marshall County
Richland Township	Marshall County
Rock Township	Marshall County
St. Bridget Township	Marshall County
Vermillion Township	Marshall County
Walnut Township	Marshall County
Waterville Township	Marshall County
Wells Township	Marshall County
Cimarron Township	Meade County
Crooked Creek Township	Meade County
Fowler Township	Meade County
Logan Township	Meade County
Meade Center Township	Meade County
Mertilla Township	Meade County
Odee Township	Meade County
Sand Creek Township	Meade County
West Plains Township	Meade County
Marysville Township	Miami County
Miami Township	Miami County
Middle Creek Township	Miami County
Mound Township	Miami County
Osage Township	Miami County
Osawatomie Township	Miami County
Paola Township	Miami County
Richland Township	Miami County
Stanton Township	Miami County
Sugar Creek Township	Miami County
Ten Mile Township	Miami County
Valley Township	Miami County
Wea Township	Miami County
Asherville Township	Mitchell County
Beloit Township	Mitchell County
Bloomfield Township	Mitchell County
Blue Hill Township	Mitchell County
Carr Creek Township	Mitchell County
Cawker Township	Mitchell County
Center Township	Mitchell County
Custer Township	Mitchell County
Eureka Township	Mitchell County
Glen Elder Township	Mitchell County
Hayes Township	Mitchell County
Logan Township	Mitchell County
Lulu Township	Mitchell County
Pittsburg Township	Mitchell County
Plum Creek Township	Mitchell County
Round Springs Township	Mitchell County
Salt Creek Township	Mitchell County
Solomon Rapids Township	Mitchell County
Turkey Creek Township	Mitchell County
Walnut Creek Township	Mitchell County
Caney Township	Montgomery County
Cherokee Township	Montgomery County
Cherry Township	Montgomery County
Drum Creek Township	Montgomery County
Fawn Creek Township	Montgomery County
Independence Township	Montgomery County
Liberty Township	Montgomery County
Louisburg Township	Montgomery County
Parker Township	Montgomery County
Rutland Township	Montgomery County
Sycamore Township	Montgomery County
West Cherry Township	Montgomery County
Highland Township	Morris County
Overland Township	Morris County
Township 1	Morris County
Township 2	Morris County
Township 3	Morris County
Township 4	Morris County
Township 5	Morris County
Township 6	Morris County
Township 7	Morris County
Township 8	Morris County
Township 9	Morris County
Cimarron Township	Morton County
Jones Township	Morton County
Richfield Township	Morton County
Rolla Township	Morton County
Taloga Township	Morton County
Westola Township	Morton County
Adams Township	Nemaha County
Berwick Township	Nemaha County
Capioma Township	Nemaha County
Center Township	Nemaha County
Clear Creek Township	Nemaha County
Gilman Township	Nemaha County
Granada Township	Nemaha County
Harrison Township	Nemaha County
Home Township	Nemaha County
Illinois Township	Nemaha County
Marion Township	Nemaha County
Mitchell Township	Nemaha County
Nemaha Township	Nemaha County
Neuchatel Township	Nemaha County
Red Vermillion Township	Nemaha County
Reilly Township	Nemaha County
Richmond Township	Nemaha County
Rock Creek Township	Nemaha County
Washington Township	Nemaha County
Wetmore Township	Nemaha County
Big Creek Township	Neosho County
Canville Township	Neosho County
Centerville Township	Neosho County
Chetopa Township	Neosho County
Erie Township	Neosho County
Grant Township	Neosho County
Ladore Township	Neosho County
Lincoln Township	Neosho County
Mission Township	Neosho County
Shiloh Township	Neosho County
Tioga Township	Neosho County
Walnut Grove Township	Neosho County
Bazine Township	Ness County
Center Township	Ness County
Eden Township	Ness County
Forrester Township	Ness County
Franklin Township	Ness County
Highpoint Township	Ness County
Johnson Township	Ness County
Nevada Township	Ness County
Ohio Township	Ness County
Waring Township	Ness County
Almena-District 4 Township	Norton County
Center-District 1 Township	Norton County
Harrison-District 6 Township	Norton County
Highland-District 2 Township	Norton County
Solomon-District 3 Township	Norton County
Agency Township	Osage County
Arvonia Township	Osage County
Barclay Township	Osage County
Burlingame Township	Osage County
Dragoon Township	Osage County
Elk Township	Osage County
Fairfax Township	Osage County
Grant Township	Osage County
Junction Township	Osage County
Lincoln Township	Osage County
Melvern Township	Osage County
Olivet Township	Osage County
Ridgeway Township	Osage County
Scranton Township	Osage County
Superior Township	Osage County
Valley Brook Township	Osage County
Bethany Township	Osborne County
Bloom Township	Osborne County
Corinth Township	Osborne County
Covert Township	Osborne County
Delhi Township	Osborne County
Grant Township	Osborne County
Hancock Township	Osborne County
Hawkeye Township	Osborne County
Independence Township	Osborne County
Jackson Township	Osborne County
Kill Creek Township	Osborne County
Lawrence Township	Osborne County
Liberty Township	Osborne County
Mount Ayr Township	Osborne County
Natoma Township	Osborne County
Penn Township	Osborne County
Ross Township	Osborne County
Round Mound Township	Osborne County
Sumner Township	Osborne County
Tilden Township	Osborne County
Valley Township	Osborne County
Victor Township	Osborne County
Winfield Township	Osborne County
Bennington Township	Ottawa County
Blaine Township	Ottawa County
Buckeye Township	Ottawa County
Center Township	Ottawa County
Chapman Township	Ottawa County
Concord Township	Ottawa County
Culver Township	Ottawa County
Durham Township	Ottawa County
Fountain Township	Ottawa County
Garfield Township	Ottawa County
Grant Township	Ottawa County
Henry Township	Ottawa County
Lincoln Township	Ottawa County
Logan Township	Ottawa County
Morton Township	Ottawa County
Ottawa Township	Ottawa County
Richland Township	Ottawa County
Sheridan Township	Ottawa County
Sherman Township	Ottawa County
Stanton Township	Ottawa County
Ash Valley Township	Pawnee County
Browns Grove Township	Pawnee County
Conkling Township	Pawnee County
Garfield Township	Pawnee County
Grant Township	Pawnee County
Keysville Township	Pawnee County
Larned Township	Pawnee County
Lincoln Township	Pawnee County
Logan Township	Pawnee County
Morton Township	Pawnee County
Orange Township	Pawnee County
Pawnee Township	Pawnee County
Pleasant Grove Township	Pawnee County
Pleasant Ridge Township	Pawnee County
Pleasant Valley Township	Pawnee County
River Township	Pawnee County
Santa Fe Township	Pawnee County
Sawmill Township	Pawnee County
Shiley Township	Pawnee County
Valley Center Township	Pawnee County
Walnut Township	Pawnee County
Arcade Township	Phillips County
Beaver Township	Phillips County
Belmont Township	Phillips County
Bow Creek Township	Phillips County
Crystal Township	Phillips County
Dayton Township	Phillips County
Deer Creek Township	Phillips County
Freedom Township	Phillips County
Glenwood Township	Phillips County
Granite Township	Phillips County
Greenwood Township	Phillips County
Kirwin Township	Phillips County
Logan Township	Phillips County
Long Island Township	Phillips County
Mound Township	Phillips County
Phillipsburg Township	Phillips County
Plainview Township	Phillips County
Plum Township	Phillips County
Prairie View Township	Phillips County
Rushville Township	Phillips County
Solomon Township	Phillips County
Sumner Township	Phillips County
Towanda Township	Phillips County
Valley Township	Phillips County
Walnut Township	Phillips County
Belvue Township	Pottawatomie County
Blue Township	Pottawatomie County
Blue Valley Township	Pottawatomie County
Center Township	Pottawatomie County
Clear Creek Township	Pottawatomie County
Emmett Township	Pottawatomie County
Grant Township	Pottawatomie County
Green Township	Pottawatomie County
Lincoln Township	Pottawatomie County
Lone Tree Township	Pottawatomie County
Louisville Township	Pottawatomie County
Mill Creek Township	Pottawatomie County
Pottawatomie Township	Pottawatomie County
Rock Creek Township	Pottawatomie County
Shannon Township	Pottawatomie County
Sherman Township	Pottawatomie County
Spring Creek Township	Pottawatomie County
St. Clere Township	Pottawatomie County
St. George Township	Pottawatomie County
St. Marys Township	Pottawatomie County
Union Township	Pottawatomie County
Vienna Township	Pottawatomie County
Wamego Township	Pottawatomie County
Township 10	Pratt County
Township 11	Pratt County
Township 12	Pratt County
Township 6	Pratt County
Township 7	Pratt County
Township 8	Pratt County
Township 9	Pratt County
Achilles Township	Rawlins County
Atwood Township	Rawlins County
Center Township	Rawlins County
Driftwood Township	Rawlins County
Herl Township	Rawlins County
Jefferson Township	Rawlins County
Ludell Township	Rawlins County
Mirage Township	Rawlins County
Rocewood Township	Rawlins County
Union Township	Rawlins County
Albion Township	Reno County
Arlington Township	Reno County
Bell Township	Reno County
Castleton Township	Reno County
Center Township	Reno County
Clay Township	Reno County
Enterprise Township	Reno County
Grant Township	Reno County
Grove Township	Reno County
Haven Township	Reno County
Hayes Township	Reno County
Huntsville Township	Reno County
Langdon Township	Reno County
Lincoln Township	Reno County
Little River Township	Reno County
Loda Township	Reno County
Medford Township	Reno County
Medora Township	Reno County
Miami Township	Reno County
Ninnescah Township	Reno County
Plevna Township	Reno County
Reno Township	Reno County
Roscoe Township	Reno County
Salt Creek Township	Reno County
Sumner Township	Reno County
Sylvia Township	Reno County
Troy Township	Reno County
Valley Township	Reno County
Walnut Township	Reno County
Westminster Township	Reno County
Yoder Township	Reno County
Albion Township	Republic County
Beaver Township	Republic County
Belleville Township	Republic County
Big Bend Township	Republic County
Courtland Township	Republic County
Elk Creek Township	Republic County
Fairview Township	Republic County
Farmington Township	Republic County
Freedom Township	Republic County
Grant Township	Republic County
Jefferson Township	Republic County
Liberty Township	Republic County
Lincoln Township	Republic County
Norway Township	Republic County
Richland Township	Republic County
Rose Creek Township	Republic County
Scandia Township	Republic County
Union Township	Republic County
Washington Township	Republic County
White Rock Township	Republic County
Atlanta Township	Rice County
Bell Township	Rice County
Center Township	Rice County
East Washington Township	Rice County
Eureka Township	Rice County
Farmer Township	Rice County
Galt Township	Rice County
Harrison Township	Rice County
Lincoln Township	Rice County
Mitchell Township	Rice County
Odessa Township	Rice County
Pioneer Township	Rice County
Raymond Township	Rice County
Rockville Township	Rice County
Sterling Township	Rice County
Union Township	Rice County
Valley Township	Rice County
Victoria Township	Rice County
West Washington Township	Rice County
Wilson Township	Rice County
Ashland Township	Riley County
Bala Township	Riley County
Center Township	Riley County
Fancy Creek Township	Riley County
Grant Township	Riley County
Jackson Township	Riley County
Madison Township	Riley County
Manhattan Township	Riley County
May Day Township	Riley County
Ogden Township	Riley County
Sherman Township	Riley County
Swede Creek Township	Riley County
Wildcat Township	Riley County
Zeandale Township	Riley County
Township 1	Rooks County
Township 10	Rooks County
Township 11	Rooks County
Township 12	Rooks County
Township 2	Rooks County
Township 3	Rooks County
Township 4	Rooks County
Township 5	Rooks County
Township 6	Rooks County
Township 7	Rooks County
Township 8	Rooks County
Township 9	Rooks County
Alexander-Belle Prairie Township	Rush County
Banner Township	Rush County
Big Timber Township	Rush County
Center Township	Rush County
Garfield Township	Rush County
Hampton-Fairview Township	Rush County
Illinois Township	Rush County
La Crosse-Brookdale Township	Rush County
Lone Star Township	Rush County
Pioneer Township	Rush County
Pleasantdale Township	Rush County
Union Township	Rush County
Big Creek Township	Russell County
Center Township	Russell County
Fairfield Township	Russell County
Fairview Township	Russell County
Grant Township	Russell County
Lincoln Township	Russell County
Luray Township	Russell County
Paradise Township	Russell County
Plymouth Township	Russell County
Russell Township	Russell County
Waldo Township	Russell County
Winterset Township	Russell County
Cambria Township	Saline County
Dayton Township	Saline County
Elm Creek Township	Saline County
Eureka Township	Saline County
Falun Township	Saline County
Glendale Township	Saline County
Greeley Township	Saline County
Gypsum Township	Saline County
Liberty Township	Saline County
Ohio Township	Saline County
Pleasant Valley Township	Saline County
Smoky Hill Township	Saline County
Smoky View Township	Saline County
Smolan Township	Saline County
Solomon Township	Saline County
Spring Creek Township	Saline County
Walnut Township	Saline County
Washington Township	Saline County
Beaver Township	Scott County
Isbel Township	Scott County
Keystone Township	Scott County
Lake Township	Scott County
Michigan Township	Scott County
Scott Township	Scott County
Valley Township	Scott County
Afton Township	Sedgwick County
Attica Township	Sedgwick County
Delano Township	Sedgwick County
Eagle Township	Sedgwick County
Erie Township	Sedgwick County
Garden Plain Township	Sedgwick County
Grand River Township	Sedgwick County
Grant Township	Sedgwick County
Greeley Township	Sedgwick County
Gypsum Township	Sedgwick County
Illinois Township	Sedgwick County
Kechi Township	Sedgwick County
Lincoln Township	Sedgwick County
Minneha Township	Sedgwick County
Morton Township	Sedgwick County
Ninnescah Township	Sedgwick County
Ohio Township	Sedgwick County
Park Township	Sedgwick County
Payne Township	Sedgwick County
Riverside Township	Sedgwick County
Rockford Township	Sedgwick County
Salem Township	Sedgwick County
Sherman Township	Sedgwick County
Union Township	Sedgwick County
Valley Center Township	Sedgwick County
Viola Township	Sedgwick County
Waco Township	Sedgwick County
Fargo Township	Seward County
Liberal Township	Seward County
Seward Township	Seward County
Auburn Township	Shawnee County
Dover Township	Shawnee County
Grove Township	Shawnee County
Menoken Township	Shawnee County
Mission Township	Shawnee County
Monmouth Township	Shawnee County
Rossville Township	Shawnee County
Silver Lake Township	Shawnee County
Soldier Township	Shawnee County
Tecumseh Township	Shawnee County
Topeka Township	Shawnee County
Williamsport Township	Shawnee County
Adell Township	Sheridan County
Bloomfield Township	Sheridan County
Bowcreek Township	Sheridan County
East Saline Township	Sheridan County
Kenneth Township	Sheridan County
Logan Township	Sheridan County
Parnell Township	Sheridan County
Prairie Dog Township	Sheridan County
Sheridan Township	Sheridan County
Solomon Township	Sheridan County
Springbrook Township	Sheridan County
Union Township	Sheridan County
Valley Township	Sheridan County
West Saline Township	Sheridan County
Grant Township	Sherman County
Iowa Township	Sherman County
Itasca Township	Sherman County
Lincoln Township	Sherman County
Llanos Township	Sherman County
Logan Township	Sherman County
McPherson Township	Sherman County
Shermanville Township	Sherman County
Smoky Township	Sherman County
Stateline Township	Sherman County
Union Township	Sherman County
Voltaire Township	Sherman County
Washington Township	Sherman County
Banner Township	Smith County
Beaver Township	Smith County
Blaine Township	Smith County
Cedar Township	Smith County
Center Township	Smith County
Cora Township	Smith County
Crystal Plains Township	Smith County
Dor Township	Smith County
Garfield Township	Smith County
German Township	Smith County
Harlan Township	Smith County
Harvey Township	Smith County
Houston Township	Smith County
Lane Township	Smith County
Lincoln Township	Smith County
Logan Township	Smith County
Martin Township	Smith County
Oak Township	Smith County
Pawnee Township	Smith County
Pleasant Township	Smith County
Swan Township	Smith County
Valley Township	Smith County
Washington Township	Smith County
Webster Township	Smith County
White Rock Township	Smith County
Albano Township	Stafford County
Byron Township	Stafford County
Clear Creek Township	Stafford County
Cleveland Township	Stafford County
Douglas Township	Stafford County
East Cooper Township	Stafford County
Fairview Township	Stafford County
Farmington Township	Stafford County
Hayes Township	Stafford County
Lincoln Township	Stafford County
North Seward Township	Stafford County
Ohio Township	Stafford County
Putnam Township	Stafford County
Richland Township	Stafford County
Rose Valley Township	Stafford County
South Seward Township	Stafford County
St. John Township	Stafford County
Stafford Township	Stafford County
Union Township	Stafford County
West Cooper Township	Stafford County
York Township	Stafford County
Big Bow Township	Stanton County
Manter Township	Stanton County
Stanton Township	Stanton County
Banner Township	Stevens County
Center Township	Stevens County
Harmony Township	Stevens County
Moscow Township	Stevens County
Voorhees Township	Stevens County
West Center Township	Stevens County
Avon Township	Sumner County
Belle Plaine Township	Sumner County
Bluff Township	Sumner County
Caldwell Township	Sumner County
Chikaskia Township	Sumner County
Conway Township	Sumner County
Creek Township	Sumner County
Dixon Township	Sumner County
Downs Township	Sumner County
Eden Township	Sumner County
Falls Township	Sumner County
Gore Township	Sumner County
Greene Township	Sumner County
Guelph Township	Sumner County
Harmon Township	Sumner County
Illinois Township	Sumner County
Jackson Township	Sumner County
London Township	Sumner County
Morris Township	Sumner County
Osborne Township	Sumner County
Oxford Township	Sumner County
Palestine Township	Sumner County
Ryan Township	Sumner County
Seventy-Six Township	Sumner County
South Haven Township	Sumner County
Springdale Township	Sumner County
Sumner Township	Sumner County
Valverde Township	Sumner County
Walton Township	Sumner County
Wellington Township	Sumner County
Barrett Township	Thomas County
East Hale Township	Thomas County
Kingery Township	Thomas County
Lacey Township	Thomas County
Menlo Township	Thomas County
Morgan Township	Thomas County
North Randall Township	Thomas County
Rovohl Township	Thomas County
Smith Township	Thomas County
South Randall Township	Thomas County
Summers Township	Thomas County
Wendell Township	Thomas County
West Hale Township	Thomas County
Collyer Township	Trego County
Ogallah Township	Trego County
WaKeeney Township	Trego County
Alma Township	Wabaunsee County
Farmer Township	Wabaunsee County
Garfield Township	Wabaunsee County
Kaw Township	Wabaunsee County
Maple Hill Township	Wabaunsee County
Mill Creek Township	Wabaunsee County
Mission Creek Township	Wabaunsee County
Newbury Township	Wabaunsee County
Plumb Township	Wabaunsee County
Rock Creek Township	Wabaunsee County
Wabaunsee Township	Wabaunsee County
Washington Township	Wabaunsee County
Wilmington Township	Wabaunsee County
Harrison Township	Wallace County
Sharon Springs Township	Wallace County
Wallace Township	Wallace County
Weskan Township	Wallace County
Barnes Township	Washington County
Brantford Township	Washington County
Charleston Township	Washington County
Clifton Township	Washington County
Coleman Township	Washington County
Farmington Township	Washington County
Franklin Township	Washington County
Grant Township	Washington County
Greenleaf Township	Washington County
Haddam Township	Washington County
Hanover Township	Washington County
Highland Township	Washington County
Independence Township	Washington County
Kimeo Township	Washington County
Lincoln Township	Washington County
Linn Township	Washington County
Little Blue Township	Washington County
Logan Township	Washington County
Lowe Township	Washington County
Mill Creek Township	Washington County
Sheridan Township	Washington County
Sherman Township	Washington County
Strawberry Township	Washington County
Union Township	Washington County
Washington Township	Washington County
Leoti Township	Wichita County
Cedar Township	Wilson County
Center Township	Wilson County
Chetopa Township	Wilson County
Clifton Township	Wilson County
Colfax Township	Wilson County
Duck Creek Township	Wilson County
Fall River Township	Wilson County
Guilford Township	Wilson County
Neodesha Township	Wilson County
Newark Township	Wilson County
Pleasant Valley Township	Wilson County
Prairie Township	Wilson County
Talleyrand Township	Wilson County
Verdigris Township	Wilson County
Webster Township	Wilson County
Center Township	Woodson County
Liberty Township	Woodson County
Neosho Falls Township	Woodson County
North Township	Woodson County
Perry Township	Woodson County
Toronto Township	Woodson County
Delaware Township	Wyandotte County

== See also ==
- List of counties in Kansas
- List of cities in Kansas
- List of unincorporated communities in Kansas
- List of census-designated places in Kansas
- List of ghost towns in Kansas
- Lists of places in Kansas
- Kansas locations by per capita income
- Kansas census statistical areas
- Kansas license plate county codes
