= Lone Star Township, Kansas =

Township in Rush County, Kansas, U.S.

Lone Star Township
- Township
- Location within Rush County
- Coordinates: 38.530369°N 99.198366°W
- Country: United States
- State: Kansas
- County: Rush

Government
  - District 2 County Commissioner: Mitchell Blackburn

Area
  - Total: 42.329 sq mi (109.63 km^{2})
  - Land: 42.329 sq mi (109.63 km^{2})
  - Water: 0 sq mi (0 km^{2}) 0%

Population (2020)
  - Total: 237
  - Density: 5.60/sq mi (2.16/km^{2})
- Time zone: UTC-6 (CST)
  - Summer (DST): UTC-5 (CDT)
- Area code: 785
- GNIS feature ID: 475616

Lone Star Township is a township in Rush County, Kansas, United States. As of the 2020 census, its population was 237.

== Geography ==
Lone Star Township covers an area of 42.329 square miles (109.63 square kilometers).

=== Communities ===
- Bison

=== Adjacent townships ===
Illinois Township, Rush County
Big Timber Township, Rush County	northwest	north	northeast	Pleasantdale Township, Rush County
La Crosse-Brookdale Township, Rush County	west	self	east	Pioneer Township, Rush County
Center Township, Rush County	southwest	south	southeast	Garfield Township, Rush County
Banner Township, Rush County

== Transportation ==
=== Major highways ===
- K-4
