= North Seward Township, Kansas =

Township in Stafford County, Kansas, U.S.

North Seward Township
- Township
- Location within Stafford County
- Coordinates: 38.224524°N 98.738904°W
- Country: United States
- State: Kansas
- County: Stafford
- Established: 1879

Government
  - Trustee: Matt D. Fischer

Area
  - Total: 35.949 sq mi (93.11 km^{2})
  - Land: 35.94 sq mi (93.1 km^{2})
  - Water: 0.009 sq mi (0.023 km^{2}) 0.03%

Population (2020)
  - Total: 129
  - Density: 3.59/sq mi (1.39/km^{2})
- Time zone: UTC-6 (CST)
  - Summer (DST): UTC-5 (CDT)
- Area code: 620
- GNIS feature ID: 1729695

North Seward Township is a township in Stafford County, Kansas, United States. As of the 2020 census, its population was 129.

== History ==
North Seward Township was created on July 14, 1879. It was originally called Seward Township at the time. South Seward Township would be separated from it in the 1948, and the township would be renamed North Seward Township in the 1960s.

== Geography ==
North Seward Township covers an area of 35.949 square miles (93.11 square kilometers).

=== Communities ===
- Seward

=== Adjacent townships ===
South Bend Township, Barton County
		north	northeast	Comanche Township, Barton County
Lincoln Township, Stafford County	west	self	east	Byron Township, Stafford County
Douglas Township, Stafford County	southwest	south	southeast	Hayes Township, Stafford County
South Seward Township, Stafford County

== Transportation ==
=== Major highways ===
- US-281

== Demographics ==
As of the 2020 census, there were 129 people and 100 households residing in the township. The population density was 3.59 people per square mile (1.39 people/km^{2}). There were 146 housing units. The racial makeup of the township was 97.7% White, 0.8% Asian, and 1.6% from two or more races. Hispanics or Latinos of any race were 2.3% of the population.

There were 100 households: 52.0% were married couples living together, 9.0% were a male householder with no spouse present, and 39.0% were a female householder with no spouse present. The average family size was 3.43 people. 31.1% of people in the township older than 24 had a college degree, and the township had an employment rate of 65.6%.
