= Albion Township, Kansas =

Albion Township, Kansas may refer to the following places in Kansas:

- Albion Township, Barton County, Kansas
- Albion Township, Reno County, Kansas
- Albion Township, Republic County, Kansas

== See also ==
- List of Kansas townships
- Albion Township (disambiguation)
