= Cleveland Township, Kansas =

Cleveland Township, Kansas may refer to:

- Cleveland Township, Barton County, Kansas
- Cleveland Township, Marshall County, Kansas
- Cleveland Township, Stafford County, Kansas

== See also ==
- List of Kansas townships
- Cleveland Township (disambiguation)
