= Walnut Township, Pawnee County, Kansas =

Township in Pawnee County, Kansas, U.S.

Walnut Township
- Township
- Location within Pawnee County
- Coordinates: 38.299256°N 99.085559°W
- Country: United States
- State: Kansas
- County: Pawnee
- Established: 1877

Government
  - Commissioner, District 2: Brock Miller

Area
  - Total: 36.005 sq mi (93.25 km^{2})
  - Land: 35.977 sq mi (93.18 km^{2})
  - Water: 0.028 sq mi (0.073 km^{2}) 0.08%
- Elevation: 2,093 ft (638 m)

Population (2020)
  - Total: 74
  - Density: 2.1/sq mi (0.79/km^{2})
- Time zone: UTC-6 (CST)
  - Summer (DST): UTC-5 (CDT)
- Area code: 620, 785
- GNIS feature ID: 475729

Walnut Township is a township in Pawnee County, Kansas, United States. As of the 2020 census, its population was 74.

== History ==
Walnut Township was established in 1877.

== Geography ==
Walnut Township covers an area of 36.005 square miles (93.25 square kilometers).

=== Adjacent townships ===
Garfield Township, Rush County
Banner Township, Rush County	northwest	north	northeast	Clarence Township, Barton County
Ash Valley Township, Pawnee County	west	self	east	Pawnee Rock Township, Barton County
Pawnee Township, Pawnee County	southwest	south
Larned Township, Pawnee County
