= Clarence Township =

Clarence Township may refer to:

- Clarence Township, Barton County, Kansas, United States
- Clarence Township, Michigan, United States
- Clarence Township, Ontario, Canada
