= Stickney =

Stickney may refer to:

== Places ==
- Stickney, Lincolnshire, England
- Stickney, Illinois, United States
- Stickney, Kansas, United States
- Stickney, South Dakota, United States
- Stickney, New Brunswick, Canada

== Surname ==
- Alpheus Beede Stickney, American railroad executive
- Angeline Stickney, American suffragist, abolitionist, and mathematician
- Charles D. Stickney (c.1859–1924), New York assemblyman
- Dorothy Stickney, American actress
- Frederick Stickney, American architect.
- Gabrella Townley Stickney, American compositor, postmaster, and temperance advocate
- Pamelia Stickney, American musician
- Highland Stickney, American football coach
- Morgan Stickney (born 1997), American Paralympic swimmer
- Morgan Stickney (ice hockey) (born 2008), American ice hockey payer
- Stuart Stickney, American golfer
- Thomas Stickney, early American military officer
- Timothy Stickney, American actor
- Trumbull Stickney, American classical scholar
- Wallace Stickney, American civil servant
- William Stickney (golfer), American golfer
- William W. Stickney (politician) (William Wallace Stickney), American lawyer and politician in Vermont
- William W. Stickney (USMC) (William Wallace Stickney), United States Marine Corps general and lawyer
- William Weir Stickney, American attorney and politician in New Hampshire
- William Stickney (board of directors member), member of the board of directors of the Columbia Institution for the Deaf

== Other ==
- Stickney (crater)
