= Lakin Township =

Lakin Township may refer to the following townships in the United States:

- Lakin Township, Barton County, Kansas
- Lakin Township, Harvey County, Kansas
- Lakin Township, Kearny County, Kansas
- Lakin Township, Morrison County, Minnesota
