= Aetna, Kansas =

Unincorporated community in Barber County, Kansas

Coordinates: 37°05′02″N 98°57′46″W

Aetna is an unincorporated community in Aetna Township, Barber County, Kansas, United States. It lies at an elevation of 1631 feet (497 m).

== History ==
The Aetna fire station burned down in 1916 due to a grass fire. The post office was discontinued in 1946. The school on the west side of the road across from the town, grades 1 through 8, closed in 1964.
