= Garfield Township, Rush County, Kansas =

Township in Rush County, Kansas, U.S.

Garfield Township
- Township
- Location within Rush County
- Coordinates: 38.419799°N 99.078828°W
- Country: United States
- State: Kansas
- County: Rush

Government
  - District 2 County Commissioner: Mitchell Blackburn

Area
  - Total: 53.591 sq mi (138.80 km^{2})
  - Land: 53.586 sq mi (138.79 km^{2})
  - Water: 0.005 sq mi (0.013 km^{2}) 0.01%

Population (2020)
  - Total: 112
  - Density: 2.09/sq mi (0.807/km^{2})
- Time zone: UTC-6 (CST)
  - Summer (DST): UTC-5 (CDT)
- Area code: 785
- GNIS feature ID: 475614

Garfield Township is a township in Rush County, Kansas, United States. As of the 2020 census, its population was 112.

== Geography ==
Garfield Township covers an area of 53.591 square miles (138.80 square kilometers).

=== Adjacent townships ===
Pioneer Township, Rush County
Lone Star Township, Rush County	northwest	north	northeast	Walnut Township, Barton County
Banner Township, Rush County	west	self	east	Clarence Township, Barton County
Ash Valley Township, Pawnee County	southwest	south	southeast	Pawnee Rock Township, Barton County
Walnut Township, Pawnee County

== Transportation ==
=== Major highways ===
- K-96
