= South Bend Township =

South Bend Township may refer to the following townships in the United States:

- South Bend Township, Barton County, Kansas
- South Bend Township, Blue Earth County, Minnesota
- South Bend Township, Pennsylvania
