= River Township, Kansas =

Township in Pawnee County, Kansas, U.S.

River Township
- Township
- Location within Pawnee County
- Coordinates: 38.217964°N 98.967364°W
- Country: United States
- State: Kansas
- County: Pawnee

Government
  - Commissioner, District 2: Brock Miller

Area
  - Total: 35.644 sq mi (92.32 km^{2})
  - Land: 35.644 sq mi (92.32 km^{2})
  - Water: 0 sq mi (0 km^{2}) 0%
- Elevation: 1,946 ft (593 m)

Population (2020)
  - Total: 57
  - Density: 1.6/sq mi (0.62/km^{2})
- Time zone: UTC-6 (CST)
  - Summer (DST): UTC-5 (CDT)
- Area code: 620
- GNIS feature ID: 475733

River Township is a township in Pawnee County, Kansas, United States. As of the 2020 census, its population was 57.

== Geography ==
River Township covers an area of 35.644 square miles (92.32 square kilometers). The Arkansas River flows through it.

=== Adjacent townships ===
Pawnee Rock Township, Barton County
		north	northeast	Liberty Township, Barton County
Larned Township, Pawnee County	west	self	east	Lincoln Township, Stafford County
Pleasant Grove Township, Pawnee County	southwest	south	southeast	Douglas Township, Stafford County
Logan Township, Pawnee County

== Transportation ==
=== Major highways ===
- US-56
- K-156
