= Great Bend (disambiguation) =

Great Bend, Kansas is a city in and the county seat of Barton County, Kansas.

Great Bend may also refer to

== United States ==
- Great Bend Township, Barton County, Kansas
- Great Bend Township, Cottonwood County, Minnesota
- Great Bend, New York
- Great Bend, North Dakota
- Great Bend, Pennsylvania
- Great Bend Township, Susquehanna County, Pennsylvania

== Canada ==
- Rural Municipality of Great Bend No. 405, Saskatchewan

== Other uses ==
- Great Bend of the Nile
- Yarlung Tsangpo Grand Canyon, a portion of which is known as the Great Bend

== See also ==
- Big Bend (disambiguation)
