= Boyd, Kansas =

Unincorporated community in Barton County, Kansas

Coordinates: 38°31′07″N 98°50′54″W

Boyd is an unincorporated community in Eureka Township, Barton County, Kansas, United States.

== History ==
A post office was opened in June 1874 as Maherville. In January 1904, the town and post office were renamed Boyd. It was a station and shipping point on the Missouri Pacific Railroad.

By 1910 the nearby community had reached a population of 40. The post office closed in October 1937.

Commercial buildings incorporating "post rock" architecture remained standing through at least 2023.
