= Larned Township, Kansas =

Township in Pawnee County, Kansas, U.S.

Larned Township
- Township
- Location within Pawnee County
- Coordinates: 38.220144°N 99.075568°W
- Country: United States
- State: Kansas
- County: Pawnee
- Established: 1872

Government
  - Commissioner District 1: Mike Burdett

Area
  - Total: 33.515 sq mi (86.80 km^{2})
  - Land: 33.515 sq mi (86.80 km^{2})
  - Water: 0 sq mi (0 km^{2}) 0%
- Elevation: 1,988 ft (606 m)

Population (2020)
  - Total: 267
  - Density: 7.97/sq mi (3.08/km^{2})
- Time zone: UTC-6 (CST)
  - Summer (DST): UTC-5 (CDT)
- Area code: 620
- GNIS feature ID: 475736

Larned Township is a township in Pawnee County, Kansas, United States. As of the 2020 census, its population was 267.

== History ==
Larned Township was established in 1872.

== Geography ==
Larned Township covers an area of 33.515 square miles (86.80 square kilometers). The Arkansas River flows through it.

=== Adjacent townships ===
- Walnut Township, Pawnee County (north)
- Pawnee Rock Township, Barton County (northeast)
- River Township, Pawnee County (east)
- Logan Township, Pawnee County (southeast)
- Pleasant Grove Township, Pawnee County (south)
- Santa Fe Township, Pawnee County (southwest)
- Pawnee Township, Pawnee County (west)

== Transportation ==
The Larned-Pawnee County airport is located in the township. It services Larned and Pawnee County.

=== Major highways ===
- US-56
- K-156
