= Union Township, Barton County, Kansas =

Union Township
- Township
- Location in Barton County
- Coordinates: 38°39′08″N 098°45′23″W
- Country: United States
- State: Kansas
- County: Barton

Area
  - Total: 36.32 sq mi (94.06 km^{2})
  - Land: 36.25 sq mi (93.88 km^{2})
  - Water: 0.073 sq mi (0.19 km^{2}) 0.2%
- Elevation: 1,932 ft (589 m)

Population (2010)
  - Total: 101
  - Density: 2.79/sq mi (1.08/km^{2})
- GNIS feature ID: 0475420

Union Township is a township in Barton County, Kansas, United States. As of the 2010 census, its population was 101.

== History ==
Union Township was organized in 1878.

== Geography ==
Union Township covers an area of 36.32 square miles (94.1 km^{2}) and contains one incorporated settlement, Susank. According to the USGS, it contains one cemetery, Concordia.
