= Stickney, Kansas =

Unincorporated community in Barton County, Kansas

- Unincorporated community
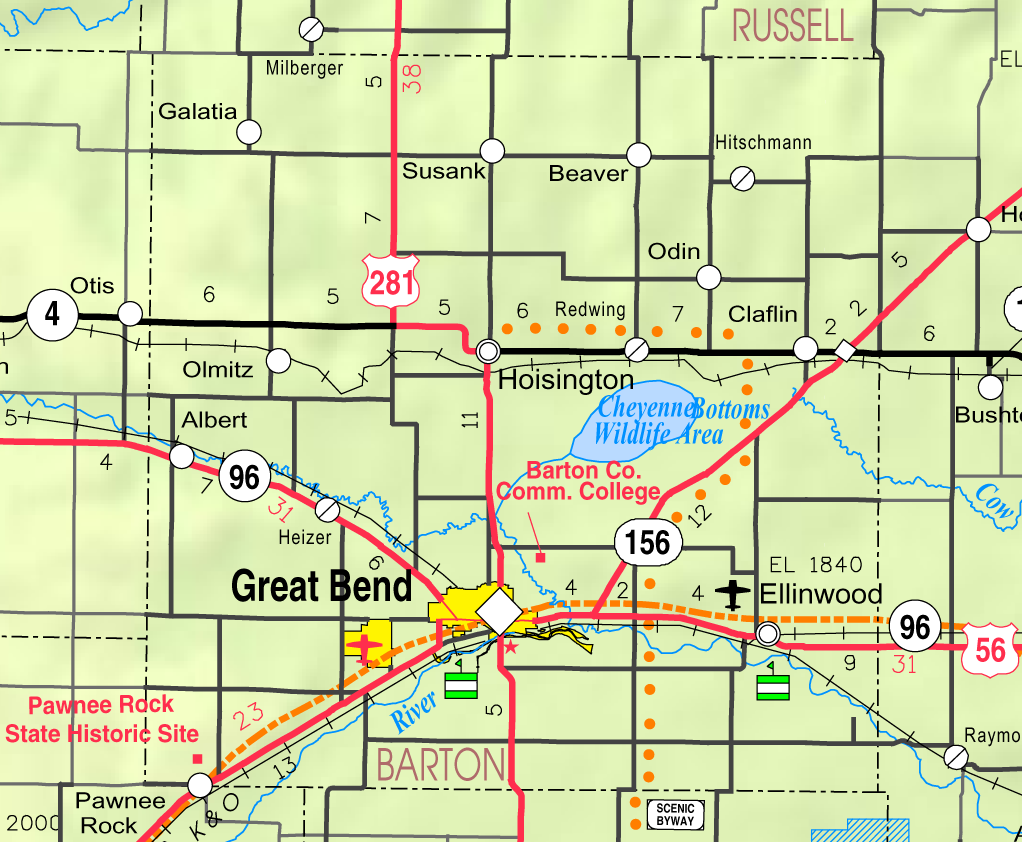
- KDOT map of Barton County (legend)

- Location within Kansas Location within the United States
- Coordinates: 38°38′17″N 98°49′46″W
- Country: United States
- State: Kansas
- County: Barton
- Township: Wheatland
- Elevation: 1,955 ft (596 m)
- Time zone: UTC-6 (CST)
  - Summer (DST): UTC-5 (CDT)
- ZIP Code: 67544
- Area code: 620
- FIPS code: 20-68250
- GNIS ID: 484733

Stickney is an unincorporated area in Wheatland Township, Barton County, Kansas, United States. It is the site of a grain elevator, but there is no community or settlement at Stickney.

== History ==
A post office opened at Stickney in 1898 and remained in operation until 1913.

== Geography ==
Stickney is 1 mile (1.6 km) east of U.S. Route 281 and 19 miles (31 km) north of Great Bend, the county seat.

Stickney lies roughly 1.5 miles (2.4 km) east of Sellens Creek, a tributary of the Smoky Hill River, in the Smoky Hills region of the Great Plains.

== Transportation ==
Stickney lies at the intersection of NW 190 Road, a paved east–west county road, and NW 30 Avenue, an unpaved north–south county road.

The Atchison, Topeka and Santa Fe Railway formerly operated a freight rail line that ran east–west through Stickney, but the line has since been removed.
