= Pleasantdale Township, Kansas =

Township in Rush County, Kansas, U.S.

Pleasantdale Township
- Township
- Location within Rush County
- Coordinates: 38.63865°N 99.087905°W
- Country: United States
- State: Kansas
- County: Rush
- Established: 1879

Government
  - District 2 County Commissioner: Mitchell Blackburn

Area
  - Total: 47.852 sq mi (123.94 km^{2})
  - Land: 47.82 sq mi (123.9 km^{2})
  - Water: 0.032 sq mi (0.083 km^{2}) 0.07%

Population (2020)
  - Total: 25
  - Density: 0.52/sq mi (0.20/km^{2})
- Time zone: UTC-6 (CST)
  - Summer (DST): UTC-5 (CDT)
- Area code: 785
- GNIS feature ID: 475399

Pleasantdale Township is a township in Rush County, Kansas, United States. As of the 2020 census, its population was 25.

== History ==
Pleasantdale Township was established in 1879 from part of Pioneer Township.

== Geography ==
Pleasantdale Township covers an area of 47.852 square miles (123.94 square kilometers).

=== Adjacent townships ===
Freedom Township, Ellis County
| | | north | northeast | Winterset Township, Russell County |
| Illinois Township, Rush County | west | self | east | Fairview Township, Barton County |
| Lone Star Township, Rush County | southwest | south | southeast | Grant Township, Barton County |
Pioneer Township, Rush County
