= Dundee, Kansas =

Unincorporated community in Barton County, Kansas

Coordinates: 38°18′31″N 98°53′26″W

Dundee is an unincorporated community in Barton County, Kansas, United States.

== History ==
Dundee had a post office from 1881 until 1902. The post office was re-established in 1915, and finally closed again in 1943.

Dundee was a station and shipping point on the Atchison, Topeka and Santa Fe Railway.
