= Barton County, Kansas =

County in Kansas, United States

- County
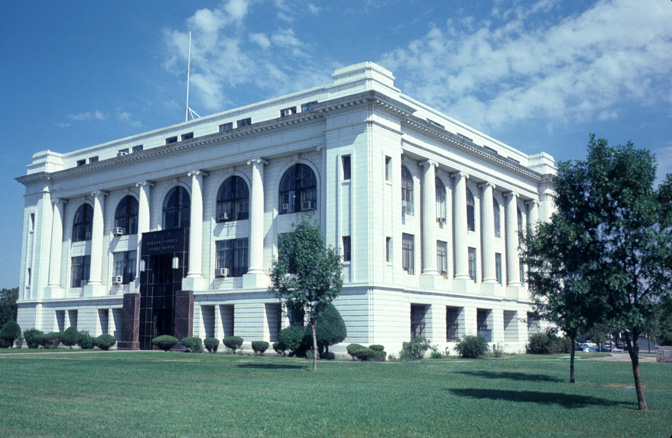
- Barton County Courthouse in Great Bend (1979)
- Motto: "Barton Invests in Growth"
- Location within the U.S. state of Kansas
- Country: United States
- State: Kansas
- Founded: February 26, 1867
- Named for: Clara Barton
- Seat: Great Bend
- Largest city: Great Bend

Area
  - Total: 901 sq mi (2,330 km^{2})
  - Land: 895 sq mi (2,320 km^{2})
  - Water: 5.2 sq mi (13 km^{2}) 0.6%

Population (2020)
  - Total: 25,493
  - Estimate (2025): 24,790 ▼
  - Density: 28.5/sq mi (11.0/km^{2})
- Time zone: UTC−6 (Central)
  - Summer (DST): UTC−5 (CDT)
- Area code: 620
- Congressional district: 1st
- Website: BartonCounty.org

Barton County is a county located in the U.S. state of Kansas. Its county seat and most populous city is Great Bend. As of the 2020 census, the county population was 25,493. The county is named in honor of Clara Barton, responsible for the founding of the American Red Cross, and the only county in Kansas to be named for a woman.

== History ==
=== Early history ===
For many millennia, the Great Plains of North America was inhabited by nomadic Native Americans. From the 16th century to 18th century, the Kingdom of France claimed ownership of large parts of North America. In 1762, after the French and Indian War, France secretly ceded New France to Spain, per the Treaty of Fontainebleau.

=== 19th century ===
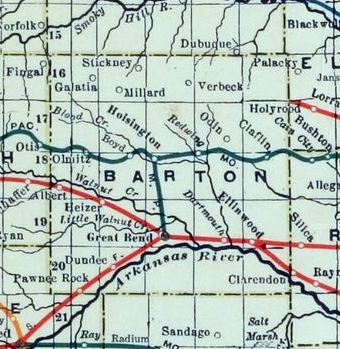
1915 Railroad Map of Barton County

In 1802, Spain returned most of the land to France, but keeping title to about 7,500 square miles. In 1803, most of the land for modern day Kansas was acquired by the United States from France as part of the 828,000 square mile Louisiana Purchase for 2.83 cents per acre.

In 1854, the Kansas Territory was organized, then in 1861 Kansas became the 34th U.S. state. In 1867, Barton County was established and named for Clara Barton. It is the only Kansas county named for a woman.

In 1878, Atchison, Topeka and Santa Fe Railway and parties from Marion and McPherson counties chartered the Marion and McPherson Railway Company. In 1879, a branch line was built from Florence to McPherson; in 1880 it was extended to Lyons and in 1881 was extended to Ellinwood. The line was leased and operated by the Atchison, Topeka and Santa Fe Railway. The line from Florence to Marion was abandoned in 1968. In 1992, the line from Marion to McPherson was sold to Central Kansas Railway. In 1993, after heavy flood damage, the line from Marion to McPherson was abandoned. The original branch line connected Florence, Marion, Canada, Hillsboro, Lehigh, Canton, Galva, McPherson, Conway, Windom, Little River, Mitchell, Lyons, Chase and Ellinwood.

=== 21st century ===
In 2001, an F4 tornado hit Hoisington during Hoisington High School's prom.

== Geography ==
Barton County was drawn in the shape of a 30-by-30-mile (48 by 48 km) square. According to the U.S. Census Bureau, the county has a total area of 901 square miles (2,330 km^{2}), of which 895 square miles (2,320 km^{2}) is land and 5.2 square miles (13 km^{2}) (0.6%) is water. The geographic center of Kansas is located in Barton County.

=== Adjacent counties ===
- Ellis County (northwest)
- Russell County (north)
- Ellsworth County (northeast)
- Rice County (southeast)
- Stafford County (south)
- Pawnee County (southwest)
- Rush County (west)

=== Major highways ===
Sources: National Atlas, U.S. Census Bureau

- U.S. Route 56
- U.S. Route 281
- Kansas Highway 4
- Kansas Highway 96
- Kansas Highway 156

== Demographics ==
Historical population
Census	Pop.	Note	%±
1880	10,318		—
1890	13,172		27.7%
1900	13,784		4.6%
1910	17,876		29.7%
1920	18,422		3.1%
1930	19,776		7.3%
1940	25,010		26.5%
1950	29,909		19.6%
1960	32,368		8.2%
1970	30,663		−5.3%
1980	31,343		2.2%
1990	29,382		−6.3%
2000	28,205		−4.0%
2010	27,674		−1.9%
2020	25,493		−7.9%
2025 (est.)	24,790	▼	−2.8%
U.S. Decennial Census; 1790-1960 1900-1990; 1990-2000 2010-2020

The Great Bend Micropolitan Statistical Area includes all of Barton County.

=== Racial and ethnic composition ===
Barton County, Kansas – Racial and ethnic composition Note: the US Census treats Hispanic/Latino as an ethnic category. This table excludes Latinos from the racial categories and assigns them to a separate category. Hispanics/Latinos may be of any race.
Race / Ethnicity (NH = Non-Hispanic)	Pop 1980	Pop 1990	Pop 2000	Pop 2010	Pop 2020	% 1980	% 1990	% 2000	% 2010	% 2020
White alone (NH)	30,341	27,973	25,094	23,092	19,911	96.80%	95.20%	88.97%	83.44%	78.10%
Black or African American alone (NH)	319	341	304	367	293	1.02%	1.16%	1.08%	1.33%	1.15%
Native American or Alaska Native alone (NH)	74	132	131	111	90	0.24%	0.45%	0.46%	0.40%	0.35%
Asian alone (NH)	145	101	60	53	80	0.46%	0.34%	0.21%	0.19%	0.31%
Native Hawaiian or Pacific Islander alone (NH)	x	x	2	8	3	x	x	0.01%	0.03%	0.01%
Other race alone (NH)	25	19	7	22	63	0.08%	0.06%	0.02%	0.08%	0.25%
Mixed race or Multiracial (NH)	x	x	263	338	926	x	x	0.93%	1.22%	3.63%
Hispanic or Latino (any race)	439	816	2,344	3,683	4,127	1.40%	2.78%	8.31%	13.31%	16.19%
Total	31,343	29,382	28,205	27,674	25,493	100.00%	100.00%	100.00%	100.00%	100.00%

=== 2020 census ===
As of the 2020 census, the county had a population of 25,493. The median age was 40.5 years, with 24.1% of residents under the age of 18 and 20.1% 65 years of age or older. For every 100 females there were 97.7 males, and for every 100 females age 18 and over there were 96.6 males. 57.9% of residents lived in urban areas, while 42.1% lived in rural areas.

The racial makeup of the county was 83.0% White, 1.2% Black or African American, 0.6% American Indian and Alaska Native, 0.3% Asian, 0.0% Native Hawaiian and Pacific Islander, 7.3% from some other race, and 7.6% from two or more races. Hispanic or Latino residents of any race comprised 16.2% of the population.

There were 10,640 households in the county, of which 28.8% had children under the age of 18 living with them and 26.2% had a female householder with no spouse or partner present. About 32.1% of all households were made up of individuals and 14.9% had someone living alone who was 65 years of age or older.

There were 12,370 housing units, of which 14.0% were vacant. Among occupied housing units, 68.5% were owner-occupied and 31.5% were renter-occupied. The homeowner vacancy rate was 2.2% and the rental vacancy rate was 16.3%.

=== 2000 census ===
As of the 2000 census, there were 28,205 people, 11,393 households, and 7,530 families residing in the county. The population density was 32 people per square mile (12 people/km^{2}). There were 12,888 housing units at an average density of 14 per square mile (5.4/km^{2}). The racial makeup of the county was 92.98% White, 1.15% Black or African American, 0.51% Native American, 0.23% Asian, 0.01% Pacific Islander, 3.51% from other races, and 1.60% from two or more races. Hispanic or Latino of any race were 8.31% of the population.

There were 11,393 households, out of which 31.30% had children under the age of 18 living with them, 55.10% were married couples living together, 7.80% had a female householder with no husband present, and 33.90% were non-families. 30.20% of all households were made up of individuals, and 14.30% had someone living alone who was 65 years of age or older. The average household size was 2.41 and the average family size was 3.01.

In the county, the population was spread out, with 26.00% under the age of 18, 9.00% from 18 to 24, 25.10% from 25 to 44, 22.00% from 45 to 64, and 17.90% who were 65 years of age or older. The median age was 39 years. For every 100 females there were 93.80 males. For every 100 females age 18 and over, there were 90.10 males.

The median income for a household in the county was $32,176, and the median income for a family was $39,929. Males had a median income of $28,803 versus $20,428 for females. The per capita income for the county was $16,695. About 9.90% of families and 12.90% of the population were below the poverty line, including 17.00% of those under age 18 and 10.90% of those age 65 or over.

== Government ==
=== Presidential elections ===
Prior to 1940, Barton County was a Democratic-leaning swing county in presidential elections, being a national bellwether from 1912 to 1936. From 1940 on, it has become a Republican Party stronghold, with the solitary Democratic Party presidential candidate to carry it since then being Lyndon B. Johnson in his national landslide of 1964.

Presidential election results

United States presidential election results for Barton County, Kansas
Year	Republican		Democratic		Third party(ies)	
Year	No.	%	No.	%	No.	%
1888	1,353	49.16%	1,228	44.62%	171	6.21%
1892	1,381	43.10%	0	0.00%	1,823	56.90%
1896	1,215	42.56%	1,616	56.60%	24	0.84%
1900	1,564	46.46%	1,772	52.64%	30	0.89%
1904	1,939	58.19%	1,235	37.06%	158	4.74%
1908	1,729	44.83%	2,004	51.96%	124	3.21%
1912	692	17.01%	2,069	50.85%	1,308	32.15%
1916	2,891	44.46%	3,292	50.63%	319	4.91%
1920	3,993	68.77%	1,688	29.07%	125	2.15%
1924	4,109	56.49%	1,605	22.06%	1,560	21.45%
1928	4,966	63.94%	2,777	35.75%	24	0.31%
1932	3,365	40.85%	4,776	57.98%	97	1.18%
1936	3,534	37.13%	5,978	62.81%	5	0.05%
1940	6,011	54.43%	4,982	45.11%	50	0.45%
1944	5,547	59.36%	3,761	40.25%	37	0.40%
1948	6,191	53.37%	5,307	45.75%	102	0.88%
1952	9,380	70.43%	3,847	28.88%	92	0.69%
1956	8,644	66.17%	4,378	33.51%	41	0.31%
1960	7,599	55.61%	6,036	44.17%	30	0.22%
1964	4,826	39.49%	7,340	60.06%	55	0.45%
1968	6,700	54.88%	4,464	36.57%	1,044	8.55%
1972	8,479	68.87%	3,481	28.27%	352	2.86%
1976	7,311	55.63%	5,497	41.83%	334	2.54%
1980	9,147	66.03%	3,663	26.44%	1,042	7.52%
1984	10,232	75.58%	3,111	22.98%	195	1.44%
1988	7,741	59.20%	5,024	38.42%	310	2.37%
1992	5,113	37.65%	3,846	28.32%	4,623	34.04%
1996	7,855	64.92%	3,121	25.80%	1,123	9.28%
2000	7,302	66.65%	3,238	29.56%	415	3.79%
2004	8,666	74.03%	2,874	24.55%	166	1.42%
2008	7,802	70.56%	3,027	27.38%	228	2.06%
2012	7,874	76.14%	2,297	22.21%	170	1.64%
2016	7,888	76.82%	1,839	17.91%	541	5.27%
2020	8,608	77.20%	2,340	20.99%	202	1.81%
2024	8,205	77.63%	2,207	20.88%	158	1.49%

=== Laws ===
Barton County was a prohibition, or "dry", county until the Kansas Constitution was amended in 1986 and voters approved the sale of alcoholic liquor by the individual drink with a 30% food sales requirement. The food sales requirement was removed with voter approval in 2004.

== Education ==
=== Colleges ===
- Barton Community College

=== Unified school districts ===
The five school districts are part of the special education area of Barton County called Barton County Special Services.

- Central Plains USD 112
- Ellinwood USD 355
- Great Bend USD 428
- Hoisington USD 431
- Otis-Bison USD 403 (Rush County)

== Communities ==
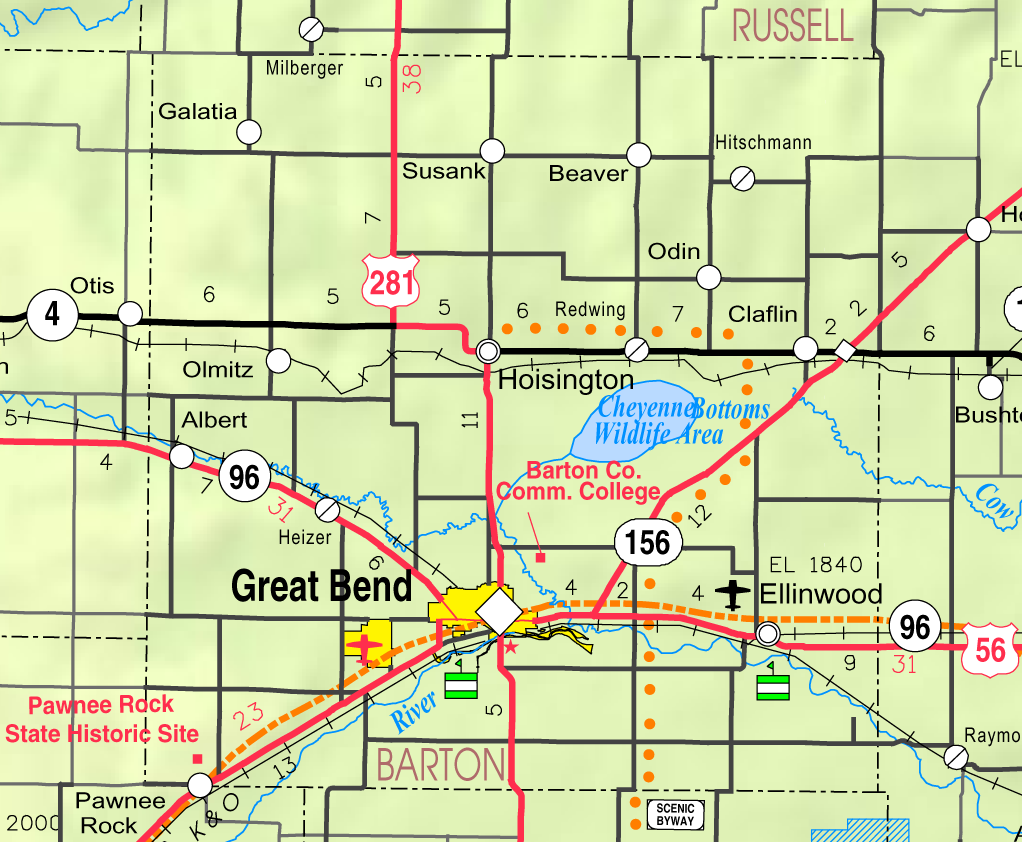
2005 map of Barton County (map legend)

List of townships / incorporated cities / unincorporated communities / extinct former communities within Barton County.

=== Cities ===
- Albert
- Claflin
- Ellinwood
- Galatia
- Great Bend (county seat)
- Hoisington
- Olmitz
- Pawnee Rock
- Susank

=== Unincorporated communities ===
‡ means a community has portions in an adjacent county. † means a community is designated a Census-Designated Place (CDP) by the United States Census Bureau.

- Beaver†
- Boyd
- Dubuque‡
- Dundee
- Heizer
- Hitschmann
- Odin†
- Redwing
- Stickney

=== Townships ===
Barton County is divided into twenty-two townships. The cities of Ellinwood, Great Bend, and Hoisington are considered governmentally independent and are excluded from the census figures for the townships. In the following table, the population center is the largest city (or cities) included in that township's population total, if it is of a significant size.

Township	FIPS	Population center	Population	Population density /km^{2} (/sq mi)	Land area km^{2} (sq mi)	Water area km^{2} (sq mi)	Water %	Geographic coordinates
Albion	00850		58	1 (2)	94 (36)	0 (0)	0.05%	38°33′37″N 98°51′31″W
Beaver	04975		108	1 (3)	95 (37)	0 (0)	0.05%	38°38′42″N 98°39′18″W
Buffalo	09075		490	6 (14)	88 (34)	0 (0)	0.12%	38°24′23″N 98°51′47″W
Cheyenne	13025		238	1 (4)	174 (67)	13 (5)	6.80%	38°31′46″N 98°38′25″W
Clarence	13475		125	1 (3)	93 (36)	0 (0)	0%	38°23′58″N 98°58′25″W
Cleveland	14025		69	1 (2)	94 (36)	0 (0)	0.12%	38°39′8″N 98°31′27″W
Comanche	15125		452	3 (7)	167 (64)	0 (0)	0.11%	38°17′50″N 98°35′59″W
Eureka	21750		116	1 (3)	93 (36)	0 (0)	0.24%	38°28′49″N 98°51′37″W
Fairview	22400	Galatia	129	1 (4)	93 (36)	0 (0)	0.03%	38°38′52″N 98°58′8″W
Grant	27475		79	1 (2)	92 (36)	0 (0)	0.10%	38°33′49″N 98°58′15″W
Great Bend	28325		1,839	18 (46)	104 (40)	1 (0)	0.50%	38°23′5″N 98°44′50″W
Independent	33975	Claflin	844	9 (24)	93 (36)	0 (0)	0.04%	38°32′36″N 98°31′36″W
Lakin	38125		299	2 (4)	172 (67)	0 (0)	0.23%	38°22′59″N 98°33′58″W
Liberty	39875		321	4 (9)	88 (34)	0 (0)	0.21%	38°18′33″N 98°51′29″W
Logan	41750		176	2 (5)	93 (36)	0 (0)	0.06%	38°28′59″N 98°31′40″W
North Homestead	51200		133	1 (4)	92 (36)	0 (0)	0.06%	38°33′44″N 98°45′59″W
Pawnee Rock	54900	Pawnee Rock	544	6 (15)	93 (36)	0 (0)	0.05%	38°16′59″N 98°59′12″W
South Bend	66525		682	7 (19)	93 (36)	0 (0)	0.17%	38°18′42″N 98°45′56″W
South Homestead	66725		343	4 (10)	90 (35)	1 (0)	1.23%	38°29′9″N 98°46′38″W
Union	72025	Susank	128	1 (4)	94 (36)	0 (0)	0.20%	38°38′46″N 98°45′59″W
Walnut	74825	Albert, Olmitz	474	5 (13)	93 (36)	0 (0)	0%	38°28′16″N 98°58′8″W
Wheatland	77600		74	1 (2)	94 (36)	0 (0)	0.14%	38°39′45″N 98°51′48″W
Sources: "Census 2000 U.S. Gazetteer Files". U.S. Census Bureau, Geography Division. Archived from the original on August 2, 2002.

== See also ==
- National Register of Historic Places listings in Barton County, Kansas

Community information for Kansas

- Kansas locations by per capita income
- List of counties in Kansas
- List of townships in Kansas
- List of cities in Kansas
- List of unincorporated communities in Kansas
- List of ghost towns in Kansas
