= Pioneer Township, Rush County, Kansas =

Township in Rush County, Kansas, U.S.

Pioneer Township
- Township
- Location within Rush County
- Coordinates: 38.529473°N 99.081865°W
- Country: United States
- State: Kansas
- County: Rush
- Established: 1874

Government
  - District 2 County Commissioner: Mitchell Blackburn

Area
  - Total: 41.654 sq mi (107.88 km^{2})
  - Land: 41.651 sq mi (107.88 km^{2})
  - Water: 0.003 sq mi (0.0078 km^{2}) 0.01%

Population (2020)
  - Total: 362
  - Density: 8.69/sq mi (3.36/km^{2})
- Time zone: UTC-6 (CST)
  - Summer (DST): UTC-5 (CDT)
- Area code: 785
- GNIS feature ID: 475620

Pioneer Township is a township in Rush County, Kansas, United States. As of the 2020 census, its population was 362.

== History ==
Pioneer Township was established in 1874. The first settlers in what was to become Pioneer Township was William Basham and P. C. Dixon who settled there in the fall of 1870. In 1877, Banner Township was created from Pioneer Township, and in 1879 Illinois Township and Pleasantdale Township were created from it as well.

== Geography ==
Pioneer Township covers an area of 41.654 square miles (107.88 square kilometers).

=== Communities ===
- Otis

=== Adjacent townships ===
Pleasantdale Township, Rush County
Illinois Township, Rush County	northwest	north	northeast	Grant Township, Barton County
Lone Star Township, Rush County	west	self
Banner Township, Rush County	southwest	south	southeast	Walnut Township, Barton County
Garfield Township, Rush County

== Transportation ==
=== Major highways ===
- K-4
