= Lincoln Township, Stafford County, Kansas =

Township in Stafford County, Kansas, U.S.

Lincoln Township
- Township
- Location within Stafford County
- Coordinates: 38.210661°N 98.848713°W
- Country: United States
- State: Kansas
- County: Stafford
- Established: 1879

Government
  - Trustee: Eddie Devine

Area
  - Total: 35.734 sq mi (92.55 km^{2})
  - Land: 35.728 sq mi (92.54 km^{2})
  - Water: 0.006 sq mi (0.016 km^{2}) 0.02%

Population (2020)
  - Total: 88
  - Density: 2.5/sq mi (0.95/km^{2})
- Time zone: UTC-6 (CST)
  - Summer (DST): UTC-5 (CDT)
- Area code: 620
- GNIS feature ID: 475739

Lincoln Township is a township in Stafford County, Kansas, United States. As of the 2020 census, its population was 88.

== History ==
Lincoln Township was created on July 14, 1879. Eventually, Douglas Township would be created from it.

== Geography ==
Lincoln Township covers an area of 35.734 square miles (92.55 square kilometers).

=== Communities ===
- part of Radium

=== Adjacent townships ===
Liberty Township, Barton County
		north	northeast	South Bend Township, Barton County
River Township, Pawnee County	west	self	east	North Seward Township, Stafford County
Logan Township, Pawnee County	southwest	south	southeast	South Seward Township, Stafford County
Douglas Township, Stafford County

== Demographics ==
As of the 2020 census, there were 88 people and 43 households residing in the township. The population density was 2.5 people per square mile (0.97 people/km^{2}). There were 54 housing units. The racial makeup of the township was 94.3% White, 1.1% Asian, and 4.5% from two or more races. Hispanics or Latinos of any race were 0.6% of the population.

There were 43 households: 76.7% were married couples living together, 2.3% were a male householder with no spouse present, and 20.9% were a female householder with no spouse present. The average family size was 1.76 people. 40.3% of people in the township older than 24 had a college degree, and the township had an employment rate of 76.1%.
