= Albion Township =

Albion Township may refer to:

== Canada ==
- Albion Township, Ontario

== United States ==
=== Arkansas ===
- Albion Township, White County, Arkansas, in White County, Arkansas

=== Indiana ===
- Albion Township, Noble County, Indiana

=== Iowa ===
- Albion Township, Butler County, Iowa
- Albion Township, Howard County, Iowa

=== Kansas ===
- Albion Township, Barton County, Kansas
- Albion Township, Reno County, Kansas, in Reno County, Kansas
- Albion Township, Republic County, Kansas

=== Michigan ===
- Albion Township, Michigan

=== Minnesota ===
- Albion Township, Minnesota

=== North Dakota ===
- Albion Township, Dickey County, North Dakota, in Dickey County, North Dakota
