= Logan Township, Pawnee County, Kansas =

Township in Pawnee County, Kansas, U.S.

Logan Township
- Township
- Location within Pawnee County
- Coordinates: 38.138303°N 98.958467°W
- Country: United States
- State: Kansas
- County: Pawnee

Government
  - Commissioner, District 2: Brock Miller

Area
  - Total: 35.854 sq mi (92.86 km^{2})
  - Land: 35.828 sq mi (92.79 km^{2})
  - Water: 0.026 sq mi (0.067 km^{2}) 0.07%
- Elevation: 1,992 ft (607 m)

Population (2020)
  - Total: 45
  - Density: 1.3/sq mi (0.48/km^{2})
- Time zone: UTC-6 (CST)
  - Summer (DST): UTC-5 (CDT)
- Area code: 620
- GNIS feature ID: 475863

Logan Township is a township in Pawnee County, Kansas, United States. As of the 2020 census, its population was 45.

== Geography ==
Logan Township covers an area of 35.854 square miles (92.86 square kilometers).

=== Adjacent townships ===
River Township, Pawnee County
| Larned Township, Pawnee County | northwest | north | northeast | Lincoln Township, Stafford County |
| Pleasant Grove Township, Pawnee County | west | self | east | Douglas Township, Stafford County |
| Pleasant Valley Township, Pawnee County | southwest | south | southeast | Cleveland Township, Stafford County |
Valley Center Township, Pawnee County

== Transportation ==
=== Major highways ===
- K-19
