= Conkling Township, Kansas =

Township in Pawnee County, Kansas, U.S.

Conkling Township
- Township
- Location within Pawnee County
- Coordinates: 38.312609°N 99.31601°W
- Country: United States
- State: Kansas
- County: Pawnee

Government
  - Commissioner, District 2: Brock Miller

Area
  - Total: 36.352 sq mi (94.15 km^{2})
  - Land: 36.325 sq mi (94.08 km^{2})
  - Water: 0.027 sq mi (0.070 km^{2}) 0.07%
- Elevation: 2,228 ft (679 m)

Population (2020)
  - Total: 17
  - Density: 0.47/sq mi (0.18/km^{2})
- Time zone: UTC-6 (CST)
  - Summer (DST): UTC-5 (CDT)
- Area code: 620
- GNIS feature ID: 475728

Conkling Township is a township in Pawnee County, Kansas, United States. As of the 2020 census, its population was 17.

== Geography ==
Conkling Township covers an area of 36.352 square miles (94.15 square kilometers).

=== Adjacent townships ===
- Center Township, Rush County (north)
- Banner Township, Rush County (northeast)
- Ash Valley Township, Pawnee County (east)
- Morton Township, Pawnee County (south)
- Grant Township, Pawnee County (southwest)
- Lincoln Township, Pawnee County (west)
- Union Township, Rush County (northwest)

== Transportation ==
=== Major highways ===
- US-183
