= Logan Township, Barton County, Kansas =

Logan Township
- Township
- Location in Barton County
- Coordinates: 38°28′42″N 098°32′09″W
- Country: United States
- State: Kansas
- County: Barton

Area
  - Total: 35.85 sq mi (92.86 km^{2})
  - Land: 35.83 sq mi (92.81 km^{2})
  - Water: 0.019 sq mi (0.05 km^{2}) 0.05%
- Elevation: 1,781 ft (543 m)

Population (2010)
  - Total: 138
  - Density: 3.85/sq mi (1.49/km^{2})
- GNIS feature ID: 0475526

Logan Township is a township in Barton County, Kansas, United States. As of the 2010 census, its population was 138.

== History ==
Logan Township was organized in 1879.

== Geography ==
Logan Township covers an area of 35.85 square miles (92.9 km^{2}) and contains no incorporated settlements. According to the USGS, it contains one cemetery, Montgomery.

The stream of Little Cheyenne Creek runs through this township.
