= Eureka Township, Barton County, Kansas =

Eureka Township
- Township
- Location in Barton County
- Coordinates: 38°28′40″N 098°52′01″W
- Country: United States
- State: Kansas
- County: Barton

Area
  - Total: 36.10 sq mi (93.49 km^{2})
  - Land: 36.01 sq mi (93.27 km^{2})
  - Water: 0.085 sq mi (0.22 km^{2}) 0.24%
- Elevation: 1,923 ft (586 m)

Population (2010)
  - Total: 82
  - Density: 2.3/sq mi (0.88/km^{2})
- GNIS feature ID: 0475642

Eureka Township is a township in Barton County, Kansas, United States. As of the 2010 census, its population was 82.

== History ==
Eureka Township was organized in 1878.

== Geography ==
Eureka Township covers an area of 36.1 square miles (93 km^{2}) and contains no incorporated settlements. According to the USGS, it contains one cemetery, Walnut Valley.
