= Beaver Township, Barton County, Kansas =

Beaver Township
- Township
- Location in Barton County
- Coordinates: 38°39′08″N 098°38′44″W
- Country: United States
- State: Kansas
- County: Barton

Area
  - Total: 36.74 sq mi (95.15 km^{2})
  - Land: 36.7 sq mi (95.1 km^{2})
  - Water: 0.019 sq mi (0.05 km^{2}) 0.05%
- Elevation: 1,900 ft (580 m)

Population (2010)
  - Total: 99
  - Density: 2.7/sq mi (1.0/km^{2})
- GNIS feature ID: 0475433

Beaver Township is a township in Barton County, Kansas, United States. As of the 2010 census, its population was 99.

== History ==
Beaver Township was organized in 1878.

== Geography ==
Beaver Township covers an area of 36.74 square miles (95.2 km^{2}) and contains no incorporated settlements. According to the USGS, it contains four cemeteries: Dubuque, Friends, Presbyterian and Saint Josephs.
