= La Crosse-Brookdale Township, Kansas =

Township in Rush County, Kansas, U.S.

La Crosse-Brookdale Township
- Township
- Location within Rush County
- Coordinates: 38.531751°N 99.373697°W
- Country: United States
- State: Kansas
- County: Rush
- Established: 1970s

Government
  - District 1 County Commissioner: Richard Luft

Area
  - Total: 84.302 sq mi (218.34 km^{2})
  - Land: 84.295 sq mi (218.32 km^{2})
  - Water: 0.007 sq mi (0.018 km^{2}) 0.01%

Population (2020)
  - Total: 1,341
  - Density: 15.91/sq mi (6.142/km^{2})
- Time zone: UTC-6 (CST)
  - Summer (DST): UTC-5 (CDT)
- Area code: 785
- GNIS feature ID: 475615

La Crosse-Brookdale Township is a township in Rush County, Kansas, United States. As of the 2020 census, its population was 1,341.

== History ==
As its name implies, La Crosse-Brookdale Township was originally two separate townships: La Crosse Township and Brookdale Township. The two townships were merged together in the 1970s to create La Crosse-Brookdale Township.

=== La Crosse Township ===
La Crosse Township was established in 1877 from part of Center Township. The first settlers in what was to become La Crosse Township were D. A. Stubbs and S. W. Taylor, who settled there in 1876. In 1879, Big Timber Township was created from it.

=== Brookdale Township ===
Brookdale Township was established in 1874. The first settlers in what was to become Brookdale Township were James Corrall and Joseph Shaw Brown, who settled there in 1871. In 1878, parts of Brookdale Township were split off to create Hampton Township (now part of Hampton-Fairview Township) and Union Township.

== Geography ==
La Crosse-Brookdale Township covers an area of 84.302 square miles (218.34 square kilometers).

=== Communities ===
- La Crosse

=== Adjacent townships ===
Big Timber Township, Rush County
Hampton-Fairview Township, Rush County	northwest	north	northeast	Illinois Township, Rush County
Alexander-Belle Prairie Township, Rush County	west	self	east	Lone Star Township, Rush County
		south	southeast	Banner Township, Rush County
Center Township, Rush County; Union Township, Rush County

== Transportation ==
=== Major highways ===
- US-183
- K-4
