= Webster Township, Wilson County, Kansas =

Township in Wilson County, Kansas, U.S.

Coordinates: 37.6917°N 95.8069°W

Webster Township is a township in Wilson County, Kansas, United States.

== History ==
Webster Township was established in 1890.
