= Buffalo Township, Barton County, Kansas =

Buffalo Township
- Township
- Location in Barton County
- Coordinates: 38°23′27″N 098°52′00″W
- Country: United States
- State: Kansas
- County: Barton

Area
  - Total: 34.14 sq mi (88.41 km^{2})
  - Land: 34.1 sq mi (88.3 km^{2})
  - Water: 0.042 sq mi (0.11 km^{2}) 0.12%
- Elevation: 1,877 ft (572 m)

Population (2010)
  - Total: 417
  - Density: 12.2/sq mi (4.72/km^{2})
- GNIS feature ID: 0475639

Buffalo Township is a township in Barton County, Kansas, United States. As of the 2010 census, its population was 417.

== History ==
Buffalo Township was organized in 1872.

== Geography ==
Buffalo Township covers an area of 34.14 square miles (88.4 km^{2}) and contains no incorporated settlements, though the city of Great Bend is on its southeastern border. According to the USGS, it contains one cemetery, Everett.
