= Hoisington USD 431 =

Public school district in Hoisington, Kansas

Address
- 165 W. 3rd St. Hoisington, Kansas, 67544; United States
- Coordinates: 38.5158°N 98.7783°W

District information
- Type: Public
- Grades: K to 12
- Schools: 4

Other information
- Website: usd431.net

Hoisington USD 431 is a public unified school district headquartered in Hoisington, Kansas, United States. The district includes the communities of Hoisington, Galatia, Susank, and nearby rural areas.

== Schools ==
The school district operates the following schools:

- Hoisington High School
- Hoisington Middle School
- Lincoln Elementary
- Roosevelt Elementary

== See also ==
- Kansas State Department of Education
- Kansas State High School Activities Association
- List of high schools in Kansas
- List of unified school districts in Kansas
