= Prairie Township, Wilson County, Kansas =

Township in Wilson County, Kansas, U.S.

Coordinates: 37.600°N 95.823°W

Prairie Township is a township in Wilson County, Kansas, United States.

== History ==
Prairie Township was established in 1872. It was named from its setting upon the prairie.
