= Independent Township, Kansas =

Independent Township
- Township
- Location in Barton County
- Coordinates: 38°33′55″N 098°32′07″W
- Country: United States
- State: Kansas
- County: Barton

Area
  - Total: 35.89 sq mi (92.95 km^{2})
  - Land: 35.87 sq mi (92.91 km^{2})
  - Water: 0.015 sq mi (0.04 km^{2}) 0.04%
- Elevation: 1,841 ft (561 m)

Population (2010)
  - Total: 758
  - Density: 21.1/sq mi (8.16/km^{2})
- GNIS feature ID: 0475525

Independent Township is a township in Barton County, Kansas, United States. As of the 2010 census, its population was 758.

== History ==
Independent Township was organized in 1875.

== Geography ==
Independent Township covers an area of 35.89 square miles (93.0 km^{2}) and contains one incorporated settlement, Claflin. According to the USGS, it contains two cemeteries: Bloomingdale and Pleasant View.
