= Ash Valley Township, Kansas =

Township in Pawnee County, Kansas, U.S.

Ash Valley Township
- Township
- Location within Pawnee County
- Coordinates: 38.312914°N 99.200546°W
- Country: United States
- State: Kansas
- County: Pawnee
- Established: 1881

Government
  - Commissioner, District 2: Brock Miller

Area
  - Total: 36.684 sq mi (95.01 km^{2})
  - Land: 36.659 sq mi (94.95 km^{2})
  - Water: 0.025 sq mi (0.065 km^{2}) 0.07%
- Elevation: 2,064 ft (629 m)

Population (2020)
  - Total: 74
  - Density: 2.0/sq mi (0.78/km^{2})
- Time zone: UTC-6 (CST)
  - Summer (DST): UTC-5 (CDT)
- Area code: 620, 785
- GNIS feature ID: 475724

Ash Valley Township is a township in Pawnee County, Kansas, United States. As of the 2020 census, its population was 74.

== History ==
Settlers began moving into the area that is now the township in 1875, and the township was formally established in 1881.

== Geography ==
Ash Valley Township covers an area of 36.684 square miles (95.01 square kilometers).

=== Communities ===
- Ash Valley

=== Adjacent townships ===
- Banner Township, Rush County (north)
- Garfield Township, Rush County (northeast)
- Walnut Township, Pawnee County (east)
- Pawnee Township, Pawnee County (south)
- Morton Township, Pawnee County (southwest)
- Conkling Township, Pawnee County (west)
- Center Township, Rush County (northwest)
