= Verdigris Township, Kansas =

Township in Wilson County, Kansas, U.S.

Coordinates: 37.6775°N 95.9092°W

Verdigris Township is a township in Wilson County, Kansas, United States.

== History ==
Verdigris Township was named from the Verdigris River, where pioneer settlers built their first cabins.
