= Olmitz, Kansas =

City in Barton County, Kansas

- City
- Location within Barton County and Kansas

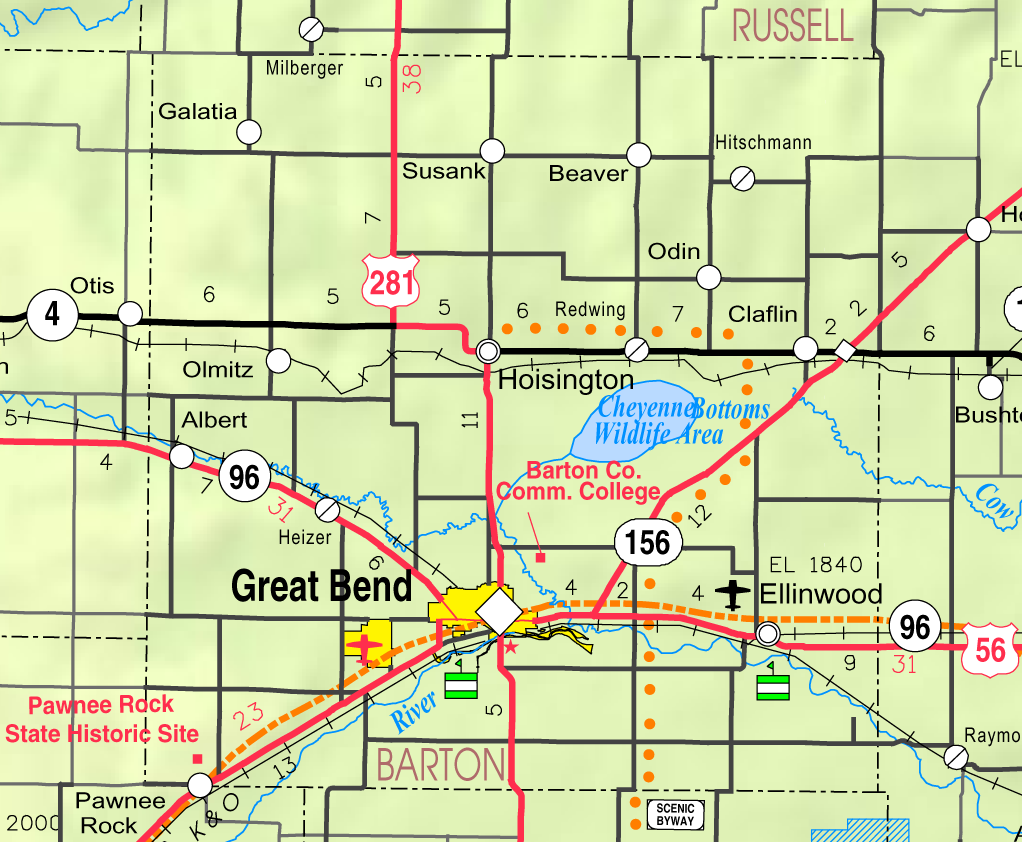
- KDOT map of Barton County (legend)
- Coordinates: 38°30′59″N 98°56′15″W
- Country: United States
- State: Kansas
- County: Barton
- Founded: 1880s
- Platted: 1885
- Incorporated: 1920
- Named for: Olomouc

Area
  - Total: 0.16 sq mi (0.41 km^{2})
  - Land: 0.16 sq mi (0.41 km^{2})
  - Water: 0 sq mi (0.00 km^{2})
- Elevation: 2,021 ft (616 m)

Population (2020)
  - Total: 90
  - Density: 570/sq mi (220/km^{2})
- Time zone: UTC-6 (CST)
  - Summer (DST): UTC-5 (CDT)
- ZIP Code: 67564
- Area code: 620
- FIPS code: 20-52750
- GNIS ID: 475502

Olmitz is a city in Barton County, Kansas, United States. As of the 2020 census, the population of the city was 90.

== History ==
Olmitz was laid out in 1885. It was named after the city of Olomouc (German: Olmütz), in Austria-Hungary (today in the Czech Republic). Olmitz was originally built up chiefly by Austrians.

== Geography ==
According to the United States Census Bureau, the city has a total area of 0.17 square miles (0.44 km^{2}), all land.

== Demographics ==
Historical population
Census	Pop.	Note	%±
1930	166		—
1940	130		−21.7%
1950	125		−3.8%
1960	141		12.8%
1970	161		14.2%
1980	140		−13.0%
1990	130		−7.1%
2000	138		6.2%
2010	114		−17.4%
2020	90		−21.1%
U.S. Decennial Census

=== 2020 census ===
The 2020 United States census counted 90 people, 40 households, and 29 families in Olmitz. The population density was 566.0 per square mile (218.5/km^{2}). There were 56 housing units at an average density of 352.2 per square mile (136.0/km^{2}). The racial makeup was 96.67% (87) white or European American (96.67% non-Hispanic white), 0.0% (0) black or African-American, 0.0% (0) Native American or Alaska Native, 0.0% (0) Asian, 0.0% (0) Pacific Islander or Native Hawaiian, 0.0% (0) from other races, and 3.33% (3) from two or more races. Hispanic or Latino of any race was 0.0% (0) of the population.

Of the 40 households, 27.5% had children under the age of 18; 60.0% were married couples living together; 20.0% had a female householder with no spouse or partner present. 27.5% of households consisted of individuals and 15.0% had someone living alone who was 65 years of age or older. The average household size was 2.1 and the average family size was 3.3. The percent of those with a bachelor's degree or higher was estimated to be 4.4% of the population.

17.8% of the population was under the age of 18, 5.6% from 18 to 24, 23.3% from 25 to 44, 34.4% from 45 to 64, and 18.9% who were 65 years of age or older. The median age was 46.0 years. For every 100 females, there were 109.3 males. For every 100 females ages 18 and older, there were 105.6 males.

The 2016–2020 5-year American Community Survey estimates show that the median family income was $100,000 (+/- $74,556). Males had a median income of $42,500 (+/- $40,367) versus $33,333 (+/- $29,850) for females. The median income for those above 16 years old was $34,167 (+/- $24,941). Approximately, 0.0% of families and 12.7% of the population were below the poverty line, including 0.0% of those under the age of 18 and 0.0% of those ages 65 or over.

=== 2010 census ===
As of the census of 2010, there were 114 people, 54 households, and 33 families living in the city. The population density was 670.6 inhabitants per square mile (258.9/km^{2}). There were 70 housing units at an average density of 411.8 per square mile (159.0/km^{2}). The racial makeup of the city was 99.1% White and 0.9% from two or more races. Hispanic or Latino of any race were 0.9% of the population.

There were 54 households, of which 25.9% had children under the age of 18 living with them, 48.1% were married couples living together, 7.4% had a female householder with no husband present, 5.6% had a male householder with no wife present, and 38.9% were non-families. 33.3% of all households were made up of individuals, and 24.1% had someone living alone who was 65 years of age or older. The average household size was 2.11 and the average family size was 2.64.

The median age in the city was 44 years. 19.3% of residents were under the age of 18; 10.5% were between the ages of 18 and 24; 22% were from 25 to 44; 23.7% were from 45 to 64; and 24.6% were 65 years of age or older. The gender makeup of the city was 50.0% male and 50.0% female.
