= Albert, Kansas =

City in Barton County, Kansas

- City
- Location within Barton County and Kansas

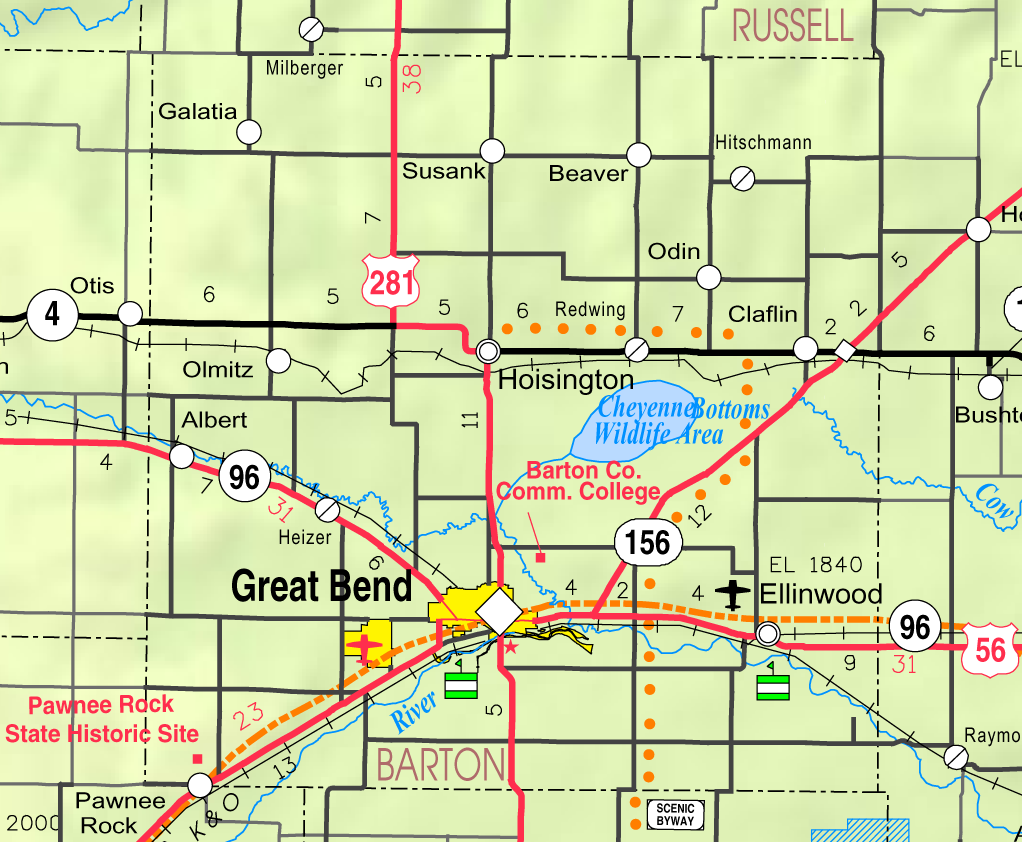
- KDOT map of Barton County (legend)
- Coordinates: 38°27′11″N 99°0′45″W
- Country: United States
- State: Kansas
- County: Barton
- Founded: 1880s
- Incorporated: 1929
- Named for: Albert Kraisinger

Area
  - Total: 0.24 sq mi (0.61 km^{2})
  - Land: 0.24 sq mi (0.61 km^{2})
  - Water: 0 sq mi (0.00 km^{2})
- Elevation: 1,916 ft (584 m)

Population (2020)
  - Total: 132
  - Density: 560/sq mi (220/km^{2})
- Time zone: UTC-6 (CST)
  - Summer (DST): UTC-5 (CDT)
- ZIP Code: 67511
- Area code: 620
- FIPS code: 20-00825
- GNIS ID: 475626

Albert is a city in Barton County, Kansas, United States. As of the 2020 census, the population of the city was 132.

== History ==
Albert was founded circa the early 1880s. It was named for Albert Kraisinger, a storekeeper. Albert was a station on the Great Bend and Scott division of the Atchison, Topeka and Santa Fe Railway.

== Geography ==
According to the United States Census Bureau, the city has a total area of 0.24 square miles (0.62 km^{2}), all land.

== Demographics ==
Historical population
Census	Pop.	Note	%±
1930	183		—
1940	174		−4.9%
1950	218		25.3%
1960	221		1.4%
1970	235		6.3%
1980	236		0.4%
1990	229		−3.0%
2000	181		−21.0%
2010	175		−3.3%
2020	132		−24.6%
U.S. Decennial Census

=== 2020 census ===
The 2020 United States census counted 132 people, 64 households, and 42 families in Albert. The population density was 561.7 per square mile (216.9/km^{2}). There were 74 housing units at an average density of 314.9 per square mile (121.6/km^{2}). The racial makeup was 93.94% (124) white or European American (92.42% non-Hispanic white), 0.0% (0) black or African-American, 0.76% (1) Native American or Alaska Native, 0.0% (0) Asian, 0.0% (0) Pacific Islander or Native Hawaiian, 0.0% (0) from other races, and 5.3% (7) from two or more races. Hispanic or Latino of any race was 5.3% (7) of the population.

Of the 64 households, 20.3% had children under the age of 18; 56.2% were married couples living together; 23.4% had a female householder with no spouse or partner present. 32.8% of households consisted of individuals and 12.5% had someone living alone who was 65 years of age or older. The average household size was 2.5 and the average family size was 2.9. The percent of those with a bachelor's degree or higher was estimated to be 12.9% of the population.

12.1% of the population was under the age of 18, 8.3% from 18 to 24, 22.7% from 25 to 44, 23.5% from 45 to 64, and 33.3% who were 65 years of age or older. The median age was 54.5 years. For every 100 females, there were 109.5 males. For every 100 females ages 18 and older, there were 107.1 males.

The 2016–2020 5-year American Community Survey estimates show that the median household income was $38,750 (with a margin of error of +/- $10,354) and the median family income was $52,500 (+/- $32,631). Approximately, 11.1% of families and 15.2% of the population were below the poverty line, including 7.7% of those under the age of 18 and 8.7% of those ages 65 or over.

=== 2010 census ===
As of the census of 2010, there were 175 people, 77 households, and 58 families living in the city. The population density was 729.2 inhabitants per square mile (281.5/km^{2}). There were 84 housing units at an average density of 350.0 per square mile (135.1/km^{2}). The racial makeup of the city was 96.6% White, 0.6% Native American, 1.7% from other races, and 1.1% from two or more races. Hispanic or Latino of any race were 4.6% of the population.

There were 77 households, of which 24.7% had children under the age of 18 living with them, 59.7% were married couples living together, 14.3% had a female householder with no husband present, 1.3% had a male householder with no wife present, and 24.7% were non-families. 20.8% of all households were made up of individuals, and 10.4% had someone living alone who was 65 years of age or older. The average household size was 2.27 and the average family size was 2.62.

The median age in the city was 46.8 years. 21.1% of residents were under the age of 18; 6.3% were between the ages of 18 and 24; 18.9% were from 25 to 44; 34.2% were from 45 to 64; and 19.4% were 65 years of age or older. The gender makeup of the city was 46.3% male and 53.7% female.
