= Fall River Township, Wilson County, Kansas =

Township in Wilson County, Kansas, U.S.

Coordinates: 37.561°N 95.918°W

Fall River Township is a township in Wilson County, Kansas, United States.

== History ==
Some of the first settlements in Fall River Township were built on the Fall River, hence the name.
