= Guilford Township, Kansas =

Township in Wilson County, Kansas, U.S.

Coordinates: 37.6050°N 95.7261°W

Guilford Township is a township in Wilson County, Kansas, United States.

== History ==
Guilford Township was created in 1868. It was named after Guilford, New York.
