= South Homestead Township, Kansas =

South Homestead Township
- Township
- Location in Barton County
- Coordinates: 38°28′42″N 098°45′23″W
- Country: United States
- State: Kansas
- County: Barton

Area
  - Total: 35.06 sq mi (90.81 km^{2})
  - Land: 34.63 sq mi (89.69 km^{2})
  - Water: 0.43 sq mi (1.12 km^{2}) 1.23%
- Elevation: 1,808 ft (551 m)

Population (2010)
  - Total: 322
  - Density: 9.30/sq mi (3.59/km^{2})
- GNIS feature ID: 0475510

South Homestead Township is a township in Barton County, Kansas, United States. As of the 2010 census, its population was 322.

== Geography ==
South Homestead Township covers an area of 35.06 square miles (90.8 km^{2}). The incorporated city of Hoisington sits on the township's northern border with North Homestead Township. According to the USGS, it contains two cemeteries: Hillcrest Memorial Park and Saint John.

The stream of Deception Creek runs through this township.
