= Susank, Kansas =

City in Barton County, Kansas

- City
- Location within Barton County and Kansas

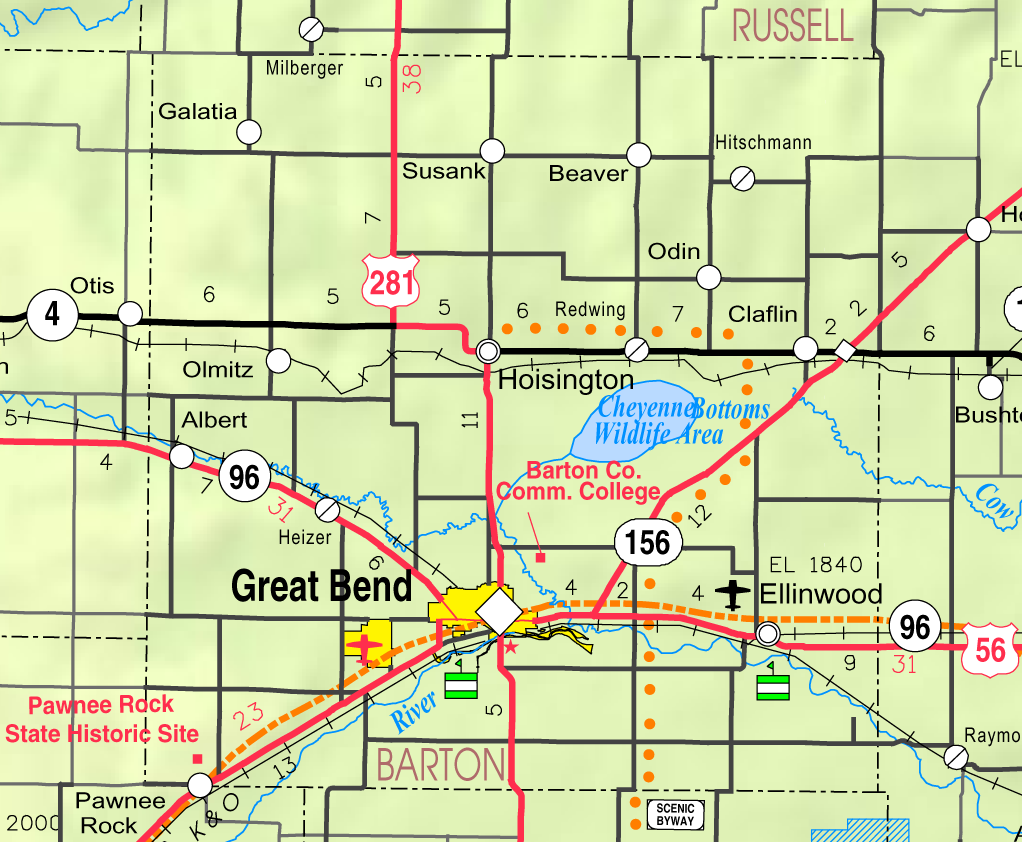
- KDOT map of Barton County (legend)
- Coordinates: 38°38′25″N 98°46′30″W
- Country: United States
- State: Kansas
- County: Barton
- Founded: 1920s
- Incorporated: 1940
- Named for: Ed Susank

Area
  - Total: 0.10 sq mi (0.26 km^{2})
  - Land: 0.10 sq mi (0.26 km^{2})
  - Water: 0 sq mi (0.00 km^{2})
- Elevation: 1,965 ft (599 m)

Population (2020)
  - Total: 31
  - Density: 310/sq mi (120/km^{2})
- Time zone: UTC-6 (CST)
  - Summer (DST): UTC-5 (CDT)
- ZIP Code: 67544
- Area code: 620
- FIPS code: 20-69525
- GNIS ID: 475419

Susank is a city in Barton County, Kansas, United States. As of the 2020 census, the population of the city was 31.

== History ==
A post office was established at Susank in 1921, and remained in operation until it was discontinued in 1991. The city was named for Ed Susank, a county official.

== Geography ==
According to the United States Census Bureau, the city has a total area of 0.10 square miles (0.26 km^{2}), all land.

== Demographics ==
Historical population
Census	Pop.	Note	%±
1950	100		—
1960	87		−13.0%
1970	59		−32.2%
1980	52		−11.9%
1990	61		17.3%
2000	57		−6.6%
2010	34		−40.4%
2020	31		−8.8%
U.S. Decennial Census

=== 2010 census ===
As of the census of 2010, there were 34 people, 19 households, and 10 families living in the city. The population density was 340.0 inhabitants per square mile (131.3/km^{2}). There were 25 housing units at an average density of 250.0 per square mile (96.5/km^{2}). The racial makeup of the city was 100.0% White.

There were 19 households, of which 5.3% had children under the age of 18 living with them, 42.1% were married couples living together, 10.5% had a female householder with no husband present, and 47.4% were non-families. 26.3% of all households were made up of individuals, and 5.3% had someone living alone who was 65 years of age or older. The average household size was 1.79 and the average family size was 2.00.

The median age in the city was 53.6 years. 2.9% of residents were under the age of 18; 5.8% were between the ages of 18 and 24; 14.7% were from 25 to 44; 61.8% were from 45 to 64; and 14.7% were 65 years of age or older. The gender makeup of the city was 50.0% male and 50.0% female.

=== 2000 census ===
As of the census of 2000, there were 57 people, 24 households, and 16 families living in the city. The population density was 601.2 inhabitants per square mile (232.1/km^{2}). There were 27 housing units at an average density of 284.8 per square mile (110.0/km^{2}). The racial makeup of the city was 98.25% White, and 1.75% from two or more races.

There were 24 households, out of which 33.3% had children under the age of 18 living with them, 54.2% were married couples living together, 4.2% had a female householder with no husband present, and 33.3% were non-families. 29.2% of all households were made up of individuals, and 16.7% had someone living alone who was 65 years of age or older. The average household size was 2.38 and the average family size was 2.88.

In the city, the population was spread out, with 24.6% under the age of 18, 14.0% from 18 to 24, 19.3% from 25 to 44, 33.3% from 45 to 64, and 8.8% who were 65 years of age or older. The median age was 40 years. For every 100 females, there were 90.0 males. For every 100 females age 18 and over, there were 104.8 males.

The median income for a household in the city was $19,375, and the median income for a family was $18,125. Males had a median income of $17,500 versus $4,375 for females. The per capita income for the city was $7,469. There were 33.3% of families and 16.4% of the population living below the poverty line, including 10.0% of under eighteens and none of those over 64.

== Education ==
The community is served by Hoisington USD 431 public school district.

== Transportation ==
The Atchison, Topeka and Santa Fe Railway formerly provided mixed train service to Susank on a line between Little River and Galatia until at least 1961. As of 2025, the nearest passenger rail station is located in Hutchinson, where Amtrak's Southwest Chief stops once daily on a route from Chicago to Los Angeles.

== Notable people ==
- Jerry Moran, United States Senator and former U.S. Representative from Kansas
