= Galatia, Kansas =

City in Barton County, Kansas

- City
- Location within Barton County and Kansas

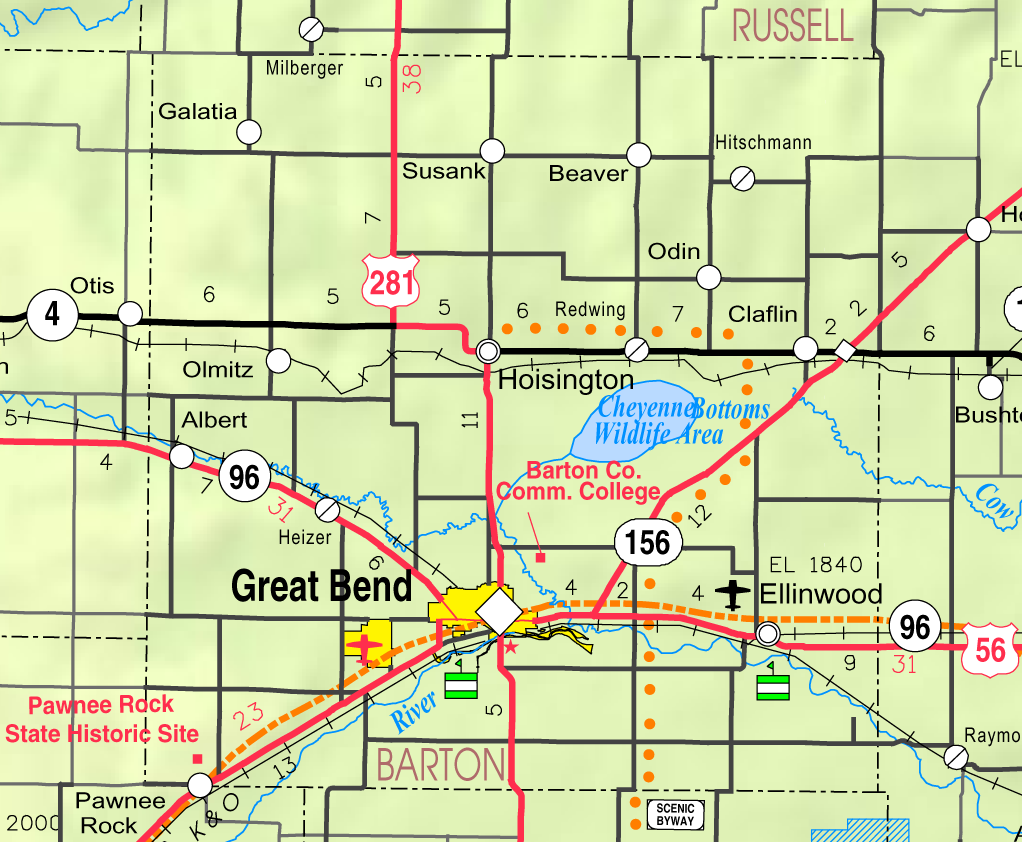
- KDOT map of Barton County (legend)
- Coordinates: 38°38′29″N 98°57′32″W
- Country: United States
- State: Kansas
- County: Barton
- Founded: 1885
- Incorporated: 1921
- Named for: Galatia, Illinois

Area
  - Total: 0.36 sq mi (0.92 km^{2})
  - Land: 0.36 sq mi (0.92 km^{2})
  - Water: 0 sq mi (0.00 km^{2})
- Elevation: 1,998 ft (609 m)

Population (2020)
  - Total: 45
  - Density: 130/sq mi (49/km^{2})
- Time zone: UTC-6 (CST)
  - Summer (DST): UTC-5 (CDT)
- ZIP Code: 67564
- Area code: 620
- FIPS code: 20-25050
- GNIS ID: 475404

Galatia is a city in Barton County, Kansas, United States. As of the 2020 census, the population of the city was 45.

== History ==
Settler David C. Barrows founded the community and laid out the town site in 1885. Originally named Four Corners, settler Henry G. Weber renamed it Galatia after his hometown of Galatia, Illinois. The first building constructed was a United Brethren church. A post office was established at Galatia in 1889. The Atchison, Topeka and Santa Fe Railway extended a rail line to Galatia (from Holyrood 31.20 miles away) on July 1, 1919, and the town grew to include three grain elevators, a bank, a lumberyard, and three general stores. By 1921, the population had grown to 202. After that, however, the population began to decline. The post office closed in 1966.

== Geography ==
Galatia is located in northwestern Barton County in central Kansas and is 22 miles (35 km) north-northwest of Great Bend, the county seat, 110 miles (180 km) northwest of Wichita, and 238 miles (383 km) west of Kansas City. It is 6 miles (9.7 km) west of U.S. Route 281 and 7 miles (11 km) north of Kansas Highway 4.

Galatia lies roughly 2 miles (3.2 km) west of Landon Creek, a tributary of the Smoky Hill River, in the Smoky Hills region of the Great Plains.

According to the United States Census Bureau, the city has a total area of 0.38 square miles (0.98 km^{2}), all land.

== Demographics ==
Historical population
Census	Pop.	Note	%±
1930	194		—
1940	150		−22.7%
1950	89		−40.7%
1960	73		−18.0%
1970	78		6.8%
1980	69		−11.5%
1990	47		−31.9%
2000	61		29.8%
2010	39		−36.1%
2020	45		15.4%
U.S. Decennial Census

=== 2020 census ===
The 2020 United States census counted 45 people, 21 households, and 11 families in Galatia. The population density was 126.8 per square mile (48.9/km^{2}). There were 28 housing units at an average density of 78.9 per square mile (30.5/km^{2}). The racial makeup was 91.11% (41) white or European American (86.67% non-Hispanic white), 0.0% (0) black or African-American, 0.0% (0) Native American or Alaska Native, 0.0% (0) Asian, 0.0% (0) Pacific Islander or Native Hawaiian, 2.22% (1) from other races, and 6.67% (3) from two or more races. Hispanic or Latino of any race was 6.67% (3) of the population.

Of the 21 households, 9.5% had children under the age of 18; 47.6% were married couples living together; 19.0% had a female householder with no spouse or partner present. 42.9% of households consisted of individuals and 4.8% had someone living alone who was 65 years of age or older. The average household size was 2.0 and the average family size was 2.2.

13.3% of the population was under the age of 18, 4.4% from 18 to 24, 15.6% from 25 to 44, 31.1% from 45 to 64, and 35.6% who were 65 years of age or older. The median age was 55.5 years. For every 100 females, there were 104.5 males. For every 100 females ages 18 and older, there were 116.7 males.

The 2016–2020 5-year American Community Survey estimates show that the median family income was $80,000 (+/- $62,556).

=== 2010 census ===
As of the census of 2010, there were 39 people, 20 households, and 12 families residing in the city. The population density was 102.6 inhabitants per square mile (39.6/km^{2}). There were 29 housing units at an average density of 76.3 per square mile (29.5/km^{2}). The racial makeup of the city was 100.0% White. Hispanic or Latino of any race were 7.7% of the population.

There were 20 households, of which 10.0% had children under the age of 18 living with them, 50.0% were married couples living together, 5.0% had a female householder with no husband present, 5.0% had a male householder with no wife present, and 40.0% were non-families. 40.0% of all households were made up of individuals, and 10% had someone living alone who was 65 years of age or older. The average household size was 1.95 and the average family size was 2.58.

The median age in the city was 56.3 years. 12.8% of residents were under the age of 18; 7.7% were between the ages of 18 and 24; 7.8% were from 25 to 44; 43.6% were from 45 to 64; and 28.2% were 65 years of age or older. The gender makeup of the city was 64.1% male and 35.9% female.

== Government ==
Galatia is a city of the third class with a mayor-council form of government. The city council consists of five members, and it meets on the first Tuesday of each month.

Galatia lies within Kansas's 1st U.S. Congressional District. For the purposes of representation in the Kansas Legislature, the city is located in the 33rd district of the Kansas Senate and the 109th district of the Kansas House of Representatives.

== Education ==
The community is served by Hoisington USD 431 public school district, based in nearby Hoisington.

Galatia Grade School was closed through school unification. Its mascot was Bluejays.

== Media ==
Galatia is in the Wichita-Hutchinson, Kansas television market.

== Infrastructure ==
=== Transportation ===
NW 190 Road, a paved county road, runs east–west through Galatia. Another paved county road, NW 100 Avenue, runs north–south through the community.

The Atchison, Topeka and Santa Fe Railway formerly operated a freight rail line that ran east–west through Galatia, but the line has since been discontinued. This line also provided passenger service via mixed trains which ran to Little River until at least 1961. As of 2025, the nearest passenger rail station is located in Hutchinson, where Amtrak's Southwest Chief stops once daily on a route from Chicago to Los Angeles.
