= Fairview Township, Barton County, Kansas =

Fairview Township
- Township
- Location in Barton County
- Coordinates: 38°39′10″N 098°58′40″W
- Country: United States
- State: Kansas
- County: Barton

Area
  - Total: 36.07 sq mi (93.42 km^{2})
  - Land: 36.06 sq mi (93.39 km^{2})
  - Water: 0.0077 sq mi (0.02 km^{2}) 0.02%
- Elevation: 2,005 ft (611 m)

Population (2010)
  - Total: 89
  - Density: 2.5/sq mi (0.95/km^{2})
- GNIS feature ID: 0475401

Fairview Township is a township in Barton County, Kansas, United States. As of the 2010 census, its population was 89.

== History ==
Fairview Township was organized in 1878.

== Geography ==
Fairview Township spans 36.07 square miles (93.4 km^{2}) and includes one incorporated settlement, Galatia. According to the USGS, the township contains one cemetery, Fairview Cemetery.
