= North Homestead Township, Kansas =

North Homestead Township
- Township
- Location in Barton County
- Coordinates: 38°33′55″N 098°45′25″W
- Country: United States
- State: Kansas
- County: Barton

Area
  - Total: 35.7 sq mi (92.4 km^{2})
  - Land: 35.66 sq mi (92.35 km^{2})
  - Water: 0.019 sq mi (0.05 km^{2}) 0.05%
- Elevation: 1,959 ft (597 m)

Population (2010)
  - Total: 111
  - Density: 3.11/sq mi (1.20/km^{2})
- GNIS feature ID: 0475509

North Homestead Township is a township in Barton County, Kansas, United States. As of the 2010 census, its population was 111.

== Geography ==
North Homestead Township covers an area of 35.68 square miles (92.4 km^{2}). The incorporated city of Hoisington sits on the township's southern border with South Homestead Township.
