= Walnut Township, Barton County, Kansas =

Walnut Township
- Township
- Location in Barton County
- Coordinates: 38°29′N 98°59′W
- Country: United States
- State: Kansas
- County: Barton

Area
  - Total: 35.93 sq mi (93.07 km^{2})
  - Land: 35.93 sq mi (93.07 km^{2})
  - Water: 0 sq mi (0 km^{2}) 0%
- Elevation: 1,929 ft (588 m)

Population (2010)
  - Total: 403
  - Density: 11.2/sq mi (4.33/km^{2})
- GNIS feature ID: 0475633

Walnut Township is a township in Barton County, Kansas, United States. As of the 2010 census, its population was 403.

== History ==
Walnut Township was organized in 1876.

== Geography ==
Walnut Township (T18S R15W) covers an area of 35.93 square miles (93.1 km^{2}) and contains two incorporated settlements: Albert and Olmitz. According to the USGS, it contains one cemetery, Saint Anthony.

The streams of Boot Creek and Dry Creek run through this township.
