= Wheatland Township, Barton County, Kansas =

Wheatland Township
- Township
- Location in Barton County
- Coordinates: 38°39′08″N 098°52′03″W
- Country: United States
- State: Kansas
- County: Barton

Area
  - Total: 36.21 sq mi (93.78 km^{2})
  - Land: 36.16 sq mi (93.65 km^{2})
  - Water: 0.050 sq mi (0.13 km^{2}) 0.14%
- Elevation: 1,952 ft (595 m)

Population (2010)
  - Total: 53
  - Density: 1.5/sq mi (0.57/km^{2})
- GNIS feature ID: 0475403

Wheatland Township is a township in Barton County, Kansas, United States. As of the 2010 census, its population was 53.

== History ==
Wheatland Township was organized in 1878.

== Geography ==
Wheatland Township covers an area of 36.21 square miles (93.8 km^{2}) and contains no incorporated settlements. According to the USGS, it contains two cemeteries: Schneider and Schoenfeld.
