= Illinois Township, Rush County, Kansas =

Township in Rush County, Kansas, U.S.

Illinois Township
- Township
- Location within Rush County
- Coordinates: 38.631951°N 99.189638°W
- Country: United States
- State: Kansas
- County: Rush
- Established: 1879

Government
  - District 2 County Commissioner: Mitchell Blackburn

Area
  - Total: 48.026 sq mi (124.39 km^{2})
  - Land: 48.02 sq mi (124.4 km^{2})
  - Water: 0.006 sq mi (0.016 km^{2}) 0.01%

Population (2020)
  - Total: 52
  - Density: 1.1/sq mi (0.42/km^{2})
- Time zone: UTC-6 (CST)
  - Summer (DST): UTC-5 (CDT)
- Area code: 785
- GNIS feature ID: 475391

Illinois Township is a township in Rush County, Kansas, United States. As of the 2020 census, its population was 52.

== History ==
Illinois Township was established in 1879 from part of Pioneer Township.

== Geography ==
Illinois Township covers an area of 48.026 square miles (124.39 square kilometers).

=== Communities ===
- Loretto

=== Adjacent townships ===
Freedom Township, Ellis County
		north
Big Timber Township, Rush County	west	self	east	Pleasantdale Township, Rush County
La Crosse-Brookdale Township, Rush County	southwest	south	southeast	Pioneer Township, Rush County
Lone Star Township, Rush County
