= Douglas Township, Stafford County, Kansas =

Township in Stafford County, Kansas, U.S.

Douglas Township
- Township
- Location within Stafford County
- Coordinates: 38.130739°N 98.857652°W
- Country: United States
- State: Kansas
- County: Stafford

Government
  - Trustee: Andra L. Bartlett

Area
  - Total: 36.052 sq mi (93.37 km^{2})
  - Land: 36.052 sq mi (93.37 km^{2})
  - Water: 0 sq mi (0 km^{2}) 0%

Population (2020)
  - Total: 118
  - Density: 3.27/sq mi (1.26/km^{2})
- Time zone: UTC-6 (CST)
  - Summer (DST): UTC-5 (CDT)
- Area code: 620
- GNIS feature ID: 485528

Douglas Township is a township in Stafford County, Kansas, United States. As of the 2020 census, its population was 118.

== History ==
Douglas Township was created from part of Lincoln Township.

== Geography ==
Douglas Township covers an area of 36.052 square miles (93.37 square kilometers).

=== Communities ===
- Radium

=== Adjacent townships ===
Lincoln Township, Stafford County
River Township, Pawnee County	northwest	north	northeast	North Seward Township, Stafford County
Logan Township, Pawnee County	west	self	east	South Seward Township, Stafford County
Valley Center Township, Pawnee County	southwest	south	southeast	St. John Township, Stafford County
Cleveland Township, Stafford County

== Transportation ==
=== Major highways ===
- K-19

== Demographics ==
As of the 2020 census, there were 118 people and 24 households residing in the township. The population density was 3.27 people per square mile (1.26 people/km^{2}). There were 39 housing units. The racial makeup of the township was 95.7% White, 1.7% Black or African American, and 2.5% from two or more races.

There were 24 households: 54.2% were married couples living together, 20.8% were a male householder with no spouse present, and 20.8% were a female householder with no spouse present. The average family size was 3.31 people. 26.0% of people in the township older than 24 had a college degree, and the township had an employment rate of 32.7%.
