= Cleveland Township, Barton County, Kansas =

Cleveland Township
- Township
- Location in Barton County
- Coordinates: 38°39′09″N 098°32′08″W
- Country: United States
- State: Kansas
- County: Barton

Area
  - Total: 36.24 sq mi (93.86 km^{2})
  - Land: 36.20 sq mi (93.75 km^{2})
  - Water: 0.042 sq mi (0.11 km^{2}) 0.12%
- Elevation: 1,900 ft (580 m)

Population (2010)
  - Total: 42
  - Density: 1.2/sq mi (0.45/km^{2})
- GNIS feature ID: 0475441

Cleveland Township is a township in Barton County, Kansas, United States. As of the 2010 census, its population was 42.

== Geography ==
Cleveland Township covers an area of 36.24 square miles (93.9 km^{2}) and contains no incorporated settlements. According to the USGS, it contains one cemetery, Bethel.
