= Big Timber Township, Kansas =

Township in Rush County, Kansas, U.S.

Big Timber Township
- Township
- Location within Rush County
- Coordinates: 38.639671°N 99.310846°W
- Country: United States
- State: Kansas
- County: Rush
- Established: 1879

Government
  - District 3 County Commissioner: Les Rogers

Area
  - Total: 47.225 sq mi (122.31 km^{2})
  - Land: 47.212 sq mi (122.28 km^{2})
  - Water: 0.013 sq mi (0.034 km^{2}) 0.03%

Population (2020)
  - Total: 138
  - Density: 2.92/sq mi (1.13/km^{2})
- Time zone: UTC-6 (CST)
  - Summer (DST): UTC-5 (CDT)
- Area code: 785
- GNIS feature ID: 475390

Big Timber Township is a township in Rush County, Kansas, United States. As of the 2020 census, its population was 138.

== History ==
Big Timber Township was established in 1879 after being separated from La Crosse Township (now part of La Crosse-Brookdale Township).

== Geography ==
Big Timber Township covers an area of 47.225 square miles (122.31 square kilometers).

=== Communities ===
- Liebenthal

=== Adjacent townships ===
Big Creek Township, Ellis County	northwest		northeast	Freedom Township, Ellis County
Hampton-Fairview Township, Rush County	west	self	east	Illinois Township, Rush County
		south	southeast	Lone Star Township, Rush County
La Crosse-Brookdale Township, Rush County

== Transportation ==
=== Major highways ===
- US-183
