= Lakin Township, Barton County, Kansas =

Lakin Township
- Township
- Location in Barton County
- Coordinates: 38°23′28″N 098°34′22″W
- Country: United States
- State: Kansas
- County: Barton

Area
  - Total: 66.65 sq mi (172.63 km^{2})
  - Land: 66.50 sq mi (172.24 km^{2})
  - Water: 0.15 sq mi (0.39 km^{2}) 0.23%
- Elevation: 1,791 ft (546 m)

Population (2010)
  - Total: 262
  - Density: 3.94/sq mi (1.52/km^{2})
- GNIS feature ID: 0475653

Lakin Township is a township in Barton County, Kansas, United States. As of the 2010 census, its population was 262.

== History ==
Lakin Township was organized in 1872.

== Geography ==
Lakin Township covers an area of 66.65 square miles (172.6 km^{2}) and contains no incorporated settlements, though the township surrounds the governmentally independent city of Ellinwood.

== Transportation ==
Lakin Township contains one airport or landing strip, Ellinwood Municipal Airport.
