= Center Township, Rush County, Kansas =

Township in Rush County, Kansas, U.S.

Center Township
- Township
- Location within Rush County
- Coordinates: 38.415292°N 99.308366°W
- Country: United States
- State: Kansas
- County: Rush
- Established: 1874

Government
  - District 3 County Commissioner: Les Rogers

Area
  - Total: 53.739 sq mi (139.18 km^{2})
  - Land: 53.739 sq mi (139.18 km^{2})
  - Water: 0 sq mi (0 km^{2}) 0%

Population (2020)
  - Total: 204
  - Density: 3.80/sq mi (1.47/km^{2})
- Time zone: UTC-6 (CST)
  - Summer (DST): UTC-5 (CDT)
- Area code: 785
- GNIS feature ID: 475614

Center Township is a township in Rush County, Kansas, United States. As of the 2020 census, its population was 204.

== History ==
Center Township was established in 1874. The first settlers in Center Township were George W. Cooley and Sarah F. Butler, who settled there in April 1876. La Crosse Township (now part of La Crosse-Brookdale Township) was created from part of Center Township in 1877.

== Geography ==
Center Township covers an area of 53.739 square miles (139.18 square kilometers).

=== Communities ===
- Rush Center

=== Adjacent townships ===
La Crosse-Brookdale Township, Rush County
		north	northeast	Lone Star Township, Rush County
Union Township, Rush County	west	self	east	Banner Township, Rush County
Lincoln Township, Pawnee County	southwest	south	southeast	Ash Valley Township, Pawnee County
Conkling Township, Pawnee County

== Transportation ==
=== Major highways ===
- US-183
- K-96
