= Aetna Township, Kansas =

Aetna Township
- Township
- Location in Barber County
- Coordinates: 37°04′28″N 098°56′22″W
- Country: United States
- State: Kansas
- County: Barber

Area
  - Total: 123.04 sq mi (318.66 km^{2})
  - Land: 122.88 sq mi (318.25 km^{2})
  - Water: 0.16 sq mi (0.42 km^{2}) 0.13%
- Elevation: 1,604 ft (489 m)

Population (2000)
  - Total: 3
  - Density: 0/sq mi (0/km^{2})
- GNIS feature ID: 0485522

Aetna Township is a township in Barber County, Kansas, United States. At the 2000 census, its population was 3.

== Geography ==
Aetna Township covers an area of 123.04 square miles (318.7 km^{2}) and contains no incorporated settlements. According to the USGS, it contains one cemetery, Aetna.

The streams of Ash Creek, Big Sandy Creek, Deadman Creek, Dry Creek, East Dry Creek, Mule Creek and West Dry Creek run through this township.
