= Great Bend Township, Kansas =

Great Bend Township
- Township
- Location in Barton County
- Coordinates: 38°23′27″N 098°45′22″W
- Country: United States
- State: Kansas
- County: Barton

Area
  - Total: 40.46 sq mi (104.79 km^{2})
  - Land: 40.26 sq mi (104.26 km^{2})
  - Water: 0.20 sq mi (0.53 km^{2}) 0.51%
- Elevation: 1,847 ft (563 m)

Population (2010)
  - Total: 1,752
  - Density: 43.52/sq mi (16.80/km^{2})
- ZIP Code: 67530
- Area code: 620
- GNIS ID: 0475651

Great Bend Township is a township in Barton County, Kansas, United States. As of the 2010 census, its population was 1,752.

== History ==
Great Bend Township was organized in 1872.

== Geography ==
Great Bend Township covers an area of 40.46 square miles (100 km^{2}) and contains one incorporated settlement, Great Bend (the county seat). According to the USGS, it contains two cemeteries: Golden Belt Memorial Park and Great Bend.

The stream of Dry Walnut Creek runs through this township.

== Transportation ==
Great Bend Township contains two airports or landing strips: Button Airport and Great Bend Municipal Airport.
