= Comanche Township, Kansas =

Comanche Township
- Township
- Location in Barton County
- Coordinates: 38°18′16″N 098°35′25″W
- Country: United States
- State: Kansas
- County: Barton

Area
  - Total: 64.49 sq mi (167.02 km^{2})
  - Land: 64.42 sq mi (166.85 km^{2})
  - Water: 0.069 sq mi (0.18 km^{2}) 0.11%
- Elevation: 1,791 ft (546 m)

Population (2010)
  - Total: 462
  - Density: 7.17/sq mi (2.77/km^{2})
- GNIS feature ID: 0475765

Comanche Township is a township in Barton County, Kansas, United States. As of the 2010 census, its population was 462.

== History ==
Comanche Township was organized in 1879.

== Geography ==
Comanche Township covers an area of 64.49 square miles (167.0 km^{2}) and contains no incorporated settlements.

The stream of Walnut Creek runs through this township.

== Transportation ==
Comanche Township contains one airport or landing strip, Peters Landing Field.
