= Banner Township, Rush County, Kansas =

Township in Rush County, Kansas, U.S.

Banner Township
- Township
- Location within Rush County
- Coordinates: 38.414862°N 99.19114°W
- Country: United States
- State: Kansas
- County: Rush
- Established: 1877

Government
  - District 2 County Commissioner: Mitchell Blackburn

Area
  - Total: 53.615 sq mi (138.86 km^{2})
  - Land: 53.608 sq mi (138.84 km^{2})
  - Water: 0.007 sq mi (0.018 km^{2}) 0.01%

Population (2020)
  - Total: 109
  - Density: 2.03/sq mi (0.785/km^{2})
- Time zone: UTC-6 (CST)
  - Summer (DST): UTC-5 (CDT)
- Area code: 785
- GNIS feature ID: 475617

Banner Township is a township in Rush County, Kansas, United States. As of the 2020 census, its population was 109.

== History ==
Banner Township was established in 1877 after being separated from Pioneer Township. The first settler in what was to become Banner Township was A. Reiner in 1873.

== Geography ==
Banner Township covers an area of 53.615 square miles (138.86 square kilometers).

=== Communities ===
- Timken

=== Adjacent townships ===
Lone Star Township, Rush County
La Cross-Brookdale Township, Rush County	northwest	north	northeast	Pioneer Township, Rush County
Center Township, Rush County	west	self	east	Garfield Township, Rush County
Conkling Township, Pawnee County	southwest	south	southeast	Walnut Township, Pawnee County
Ash Valley Township, Pawnee County

== Transportation ==
=== Major highways ===
- K-96
