= Albion Township, Barton County, Kansas =

Albion Township
- Township
- Location in Barton County
- Coordinates: 38°33′53″N 098°52′02″W
- Country: United States
- State: Kansas
- County: Barton

Area
  - Total: 36.24 sq mi (93.86 km^{2})
  - Land: 36.22 sq mi (93.81 km^{2})
  - Water: 0.019 sq mi (0.05 km^{2}) 0.05%
- Elevation: 1,877 ft (572 m)

Population (2010)
  - Total: 63
  - Density: 1.7/sq mi (0.67/km^{2})
- GNIS feature ID: 0475500

Albion Township is a township in Barton County, Kansas, United States. As of the 2000 census, its population was 63.

== History ==
Albion Township was organized in 1879.

== Geography ==
Albion Township covers an area of 36.24 square miles (93.9 km^{2}) and contains no incorporated settlements. According to the USGS, it contains two cemeteries: Boyle and Olivet.
