= Grant Township, Barton County, Kansas =

Grant Township
- Township
- Location in Barton County
- Coordinates: 38°33′57″N 098°58′41″W
- Country: United States
- State: Kansas
- County: Barton

Area
  - Total: 35.70 sq mi (92.47 km^{2})
  - Land: 35.66 sq mi (92.37 km^{2})
  - Water: 0.035 sq mi (0.09 km^{2}) 0.1%
- Elevation: 2,000 ft (600 m)

Population (2010)
  - Total: 55
  - Density: 1.5/sq mi (0.60/km^{2})
- GNIS feature ID: 0475499

Grant Township is a township in Barton County, Kansas, United States. As of the 2010 census, its population was 55.

== History ==
Grant Township was organized in 1879.

== Geography ==
Grant Township covers an area of 35.7 square miles (92 km^{2}) and contains no incorporated settlements. According to the USGS, it contains one cemetery, Saint Anns.
