= Liberty Township, Barton County, Kansas =

Liberty Township
- Township
- Location in Barton County
- Coordinates: 38°18′17″N 098°52′00″W
- Country: United States
- State: Kansas
- County: Barton

Area
  - Total: 34.03 sq mi (88.14 km^{2})
  - Land: 33.96 sq mi (87.95 km^{2})
  - Water: 0.073 sq mi (0.19 km^{2}) 0.22%
- Elevation: 1,890 ft (576 m)

Population (2010)
  - Total: 262
  - Density: 7.72/sq mi (2.98/km^{2})
- GNIS feature ID: 0475740

Liberty Township is a township in Barton County, Kansas, United States. As of the 2010 census, its population was 262.

== History ==
Liberty Township was organized in 1879.

== Geography ==
Liberty Township covers an area of 34.03 square miles (88.1 km^{2}) and contains no incorporated settlements.
