= Clarence Township, Kansas =

Clarence Township
- Township
- Location in Barton County
- Coordinates: 38°23′N 98°59′W
- Country: United States
- State: Kansas
- County: Barton

Area
  - Total: 35.89 sq mi (92.95 km^{2})
  - Land: 35.89 sq mi (92.95 km^{2})
  - Water: 0 sq mi (0 km^{2}) 0%
- Elevation: 1,932 ft (589 m)

Population (2010)
  - Total: 117
  - Density: 3.26/sq mi (1.26/km^{2})
- GNIS feature ID: 0475632

Clarence Township is a township (T19S R15W) in Barton County, Kansas, United States. As of the 2010 census, its population was 117.

== History ==
Clarence Township was organized in 1878.

== Geography ==
Clarence Township covers an area of 35.89 square miles (93.0 km^{2}) and contains no incorporated settlements. According to the USGS, it contains one cemetery, Patterson.
