= South Bend Township, Kansas =

South Bend Township
- Township
- Location in Barton County
- Coordinates: 38°18′16″N 098°45′21″W
- Country: United States
- State: Kansas
- County: Barton

Area
  - Total: 35.78 sq mi (92.66 km^{2})
  - Land: 35.7 sq mi (92.5 km^{2})
  - Water: 0.058 sq mi (0.15 km^{2}) 0.16%
- Elevation: 1,877 ft (572 m)

Population (2010)
  - Total: 674
  - Density: 18.9/sq mi (7.29/km^{2})
- GNIS feature ID: 0475749

South Bend Township is a township in Barton County, Kansas, United States. As of the 2010 census, its population was 674.

== History ==
South Bend Township was organized in 1876.

== Geography ==
South Bend Township covers an area of 35.78 square miles (92.7 km^{2}) and contains no incorporated settlements.

The stream of Antelope Creek runs through this township.
