= Pawnee Rock Township, Kansas =

Pawnee Rock Township
- Township
- Location in Barton County
- Coordinates: 38°18′17″N 098°58′37″W
- Country: United States
- State: Kansas
- County: Barton

Area
  - Total: 35.8 sq mi (92.6 km^{2})
  - Land: 35.73 sq mi (92.55 km^{2})
  - Water: 0.019 sq mi (0.05 km^{2}) 0.05%
- Elevation: 2,024 ft (617 m)

Population (2010)
  - Total: 373
  - Density: 10.4/sq mi (4.03/km^{2})
- GNIS feature ID: 0475734

Pawnee Rock Township is a township in Barton County, Kansas, United States. As of the 2010 census, its population was 373.

== History ==
Pawnee Rock Township was organized in 1878.

== Geography ==
Pawnee Rock Township covers an area of 35.75 square miles (92.6 km^{2}) and contains one incorporated settlement, Pawnee Rock. According to the USGS, it contains two cemeteries: Bergtal and Pawnee Rock.
