= National Register of Historic Places listings in Pottawatomie County, Kansas =

Location of Pottawatomie County in Kansas

This is a list of the National Register of Historic Places listings in Pottawatomie County, Kansas.

This is supposed to be a complete list of the properties and districts on the National Register of Historic Places in Pottawatomie County, Kansas, United States. The locations of National Register properties and districts for which the latitude and longitude coordinates are included below, may be seen in a map.

There are 18 properties and districts listed on the National Register in the county.

This National Park Service list is complete through NPS recent listings posted March 27, 2026.

== Current listings ==
	Name on the Register	Image	Date listed	Location	City or town	Description
1	Cassius & Adelia Baker House	Cassius & Adelia Baker House	June 25, 2013 (#13000433)	609 Elm Street; 39°12′15″N 96°18′24″W	Wamego	
2	Coffey Site		April 11, 1977 (#77000594)	West of Spring Creek Rd. along the Big Blue River and Spring Creek; 39°33′52″N 96°34′03″W	Olsburg	
3	Dennis Quarry		January 14, 2004 (#03001393)	Along K-63 near the headwaters of Little Noxie Creek, southeast of Onaga; 39°25′32″N 96°04′45″W	Lincoln Township	
4	Genn Hospital	Genn Hospital	December 23, 2025 (#100012465)	512 Spruce Street; 39°12′11″N 96°18′37″W	Wamego	
5	German Evangelical Church	German Evangelical Church	January 5, 2018 (#100001949)	NE corner of 6th & State Sts. 39°23′31″N 96°24′37″W	Westmoreland	
6	Joseph Heptig Barn	Joseph Heptig Barn	October 6, 2011 (#11000728)	12115 Antons Rd. 39°16′24″N 96°26′03″W	Flush	Agriculture-Related Resources of Kansas MPS
7	John McKimmons Barn	John McKimmons Barn	April 12, 2010 (#10000178)	Kansas Highway 99, 1/4 mile south of Westmoreland or 1/2 mile north of Hartwich Rd; 39°23′00″N 96°24′21″W	Westmoreland	
8	Old Dutch Mill	Old Dutch Mill	January 8, 1973 (#73000773)	Wamego City Park; 39°12′06″N 96°18′03″W	Wamego	
9	Pottawatomie County Courthouse	Pottawatomie County Courthouse	January 5, 2018 (#100001950)	106 Main St. 39°23′35″N 96°24′56″W	Westmoreland	
10	Pottawatomie County Fair Pavilion	Pottawatomie County Fair Pavilion	January 28, 2004 (#03001499)	E. 9th St. 39°29′50″N 96°10′04″W	Onaga	
11	Pottawatomie Indian Pay Station	Pottawatomie Indian Pay Station	April 13, 1972 (#72000521)	East of city limits on Mission St., near St. Mary's College campus 39°11′30″N 96°03′42″W	St. Marys	
12	Scott Spring	Scott Spring	September 25, 2013 (#13000762)	Address restricted	Westmoreland	
13	Teske Farmstead	Teske Farmstead	April 8, 2009 (#09000193)	20795 Major Jenkins Road; 39°30′28″N 96°14′20″W	Onaga	Agriculture-Related Resources of Kansas MPS
14	George and Virginia Trout House	George and Virginia Trout House	January 8, 2014 (#13001043)	615 Elm St. 39°12′16″N 96°18′23″W	Wamego	
15	Vermillion Creek Archeological District	Vermillion Creek Archeological District	March 10, 1975 (#75000721)	Address restricted	Onaga	
16	Vermillion Creek Crossing, Oregon Trail	Vermillion Creek Crossing, Oregon Trail	March 10, 1975 (#75000720)	Northwest of Belvue; 39°15′21″N 96°14′54″W	Belvue	A 20-acre (81,000 m^{2}) property including a ford of the Oregon Trail across Vermillion Creek, and a cemetery
17	Vermillion Creek Tributary Stone Arch Bridge	Vermillion Creek Tributary Stone Arch Bridge	October 22, 1986 (#86003354)	5 miles (8.0 km) south and 1 mile (1.6 km) east of Onaga; 39°25′10″N 96°08′45″W	Onaga	
18	Verschelden Funeral Home	Verschelden Funeral Home	December 19, 2025 (#100012439)	714 Maple Street; 39°11′56″N 96°04′17″W	St. Marys	

== See also ==
- List of National Historic Landmarks in Kansas
- National Register of Historic Places listings in Kansas
