= Mill Creek Township, Pottawatomie County, Kansas =

Township in Pottawatomie County, Kansas, U.S.

Mill Creek Township
- Township
- Location within Pottawatomie County
- Coordinates: 39.524088°N 96.183044°W
- Country: United States
- State: Kansas
- County: Pottawatomie
- Established: 1882

Government
  - County Commissioner District 5: Terry Force

Area
  - Total: 41.895 sq mi (108.51 km^{2})
  - Land: 41.75 sq mi (108.1 km^{2})
  - Water: 0.145 sq mi (0.38 km^{2}) 0.35%

Population (2020)
  - Total: 957
  - Density: 22.9/sq mi (8.85/km^{2})
- Time zone: UTC-6 (CST)
  - Summer (DST): UTC-5 (CDT)
- Area code: 785
- GNIS feature ID: 473435

Mill Creek Township is a township in Pottawatomie County, Kansas, United States. As of the 2020 census, its population was 957.

== History ==
Mill Creek Township was established in 1882.

== Geography ==
Mill Creek Township covers an area of 41.895 square miles (108.51 square kilometers).

=== Communities ===
- Onaga
- Duluth

=== Adjacent townships ===
Neuchatel Township, Nemaha County
Cleveland Township, Marshall County	northwest	north	northeast	Red Vermillion Township, Nemaha County
Lone Tree Township, Pottawatomie County	west	self	east	Grant Township, Pottawatomie County
Sherman Township, Pottawatomie County	southwest	south	southeast	Lincoln Township, Pottawatomie County
Vienna Township, Pottawatomie County

== Transportation ==
Onaga and the township are serviced by the Charles E Grutzmacher Municipal Airport.

=== Major highways ===
- K-16
