= Maple Hill Township, Kansas =

Township in Wabaunsee County, Kansas, U.S.

Maple Hill Township
- Township
- Location within Wabaunsee County
- Coordinates: 39.051133°N 96.030609°W
- Country: United States
- State: Kansas
- County: Wabaunsee
- Established: 1872

Government
  - Trustee: William D. Ledeboer

Area
  - Total: 73.695 sq mi (190.87 km^{2})
  - Land: 72.67 sq mi (188.2 km^{2})
  - Water: 1.025 sq mi (2.65 km^{2}) 1.39%

Population (2020)
  - Total: 1,136
  - Density: 15.63/sq mi (6.036/km^{2})
- Time zone: UTC-6 (CST)
  - Summer (DST): UTC-5 (CDT)
- Area code: 785
- GNIS feature ID: 1729696

Maple Hill Township is a township in Wabaunsee County, Kansas, United States. As of the 2020 census, its population was 1,136.

== History ==
Maple Hill Township was established in September 1872 from the eastern part of Newbury Township. The first settlers in what would become Maple Hill Township were Henry Fauerbach, John Winkler, and John Durham, who settled in 1868. The first school to be established in the township was built in 1872.

== Geography ==
Maple Hill Township covers an area of 73.695 square miles (190.87 km^{2}), 1.39% of it water. The Kansas River flows through it, as well as Mill Creek, Dry Creek, Dog Creek, Post Creek, and Bourbonnais Creek.

=== Communities ===
- Maple Hill
- part of Willard

=== Adjacent townships ===
St. Marys Township, Pottawatomie County
Kaw Township, Wabaunsee County	northwest	north	northeast	Rossville Township, Shawnee County
Newbury Township, Wabaunsee County	west	self	east	Dover Township, Shawnee County
		south
Mission Creek Township, Wabaunsee County

== Transportation ==
=== Major highways ===
- I-70
- US-40

== Demographics ==
As of the 2020 census, the township had a population of 1,136, giving a population density of 15.63 people per square mile (6.03 people/km^{2}). The racial makeup of the township was 90.6% White, 1.1% Native American, 0.5% Black or African American, 0.1% Pacific Islander, 0.4% from some other race, and 7.3% from two or more races. Hispanics or Latinos of any race were 4.8% of the population.

The 2020–2024 American Community Survey estimated that the township contained 414 households and 426 housing units.
