= Netawaka Township, Kansas =

Netawaka Township
- Township
- Location in Jackson County
- Coordinates: 39°36′25″N 95°43′01″W
- Country: United States
- State: Kansas
- County: Jackson

Area
  - Total: 36.09 sq mi (93.48 km^{2})
  - Land: 36.04 sq mi (93.35 km^{2})
  - Water: 0.046 sq mi (0.12 km^{2}) 0.13%
- Elevation: 1,132 ft (345 m)

Population (2020)
  - Total: 324
  - Density: 8.99/sq mi (3.47/km^{2})
- GNIS feature ID: 0473236

Netawaka Township is a township in Jackson County, Kansas, United States. As of the 2020 census, its population was 324.

== History ==
Netawaka Township was formerly occupied by the Kickapoo Tribe in Kansas, until they were removed to a reservation in Brown County. It was bought by the Union Pacific Railroad in 1870 and opened for settlement. Netawaka Township was formed in 1871. Netawaka is a Native American name meaning "fair view".

== Geography ==
Netawaka Township covers an area of 36.09 square miles (93.48 square kilometers); of this, 0.05 square miles (0.12 square kilometers) or 0.13 percent is water. The streams of Mosquito Creek and Wolfley Creek run through this township.

=== Communities ===
- Netawaka

=== Adjacent townships ===
- Powhattan Township, Brown County (north)
- Whiting Township (east)
- Straight Creek Township (southeast)
- Liberty Township (south)
- Jefferson Township (southwest)
- Wetmore Township, Nemaha County (west)
- Granada Township, Nemaha County (northwest)

=== Major highways ===
- U.S. Route 75
- K-9
