= Wetmore Township, Kansas =

Township in Nemaha County, Kansas, U.S.

Wetmore Township
- Township
- Location within Nemaha County
- Coordinates: 39.610316°N 95.835639°W
- Country: United States
- State: Kansas
- County: Nemaha

Area
  - Total: 36.018 sq mi (93.29 km^{2})
  - Land: 35.869 sq mi (92.90 km^{2})
  - Water: 0.149 sq mi (0.39 km^{2}) 0.41%

Population (2020)
  - Total: 455
  - Density: 12.7/sq mi (4.90/km^{2})
- Time zone: UTC-6 (CST)
  - Summer (DST): UTC-5 (CDT)
- Area code: 785

Wetmore Township is a township in Nemaha County, Kansas, United States. As of the 2020 census, its population was 455.

== Geography ==
Wetmore Township covers an area of 36.018 square miles (93.29 square kilometers).

=== Communities ===
- Wetmore

=== Adjacent townships ===
- Granada Township, Nemaha County (north)
- Powhattan Township, Brown County (northeast)
- Netawaka Township, Jackson County (east)
- Liberty Township, Jackson County (southeast)
- Jefferson Township, Jackson County (south)
- Reilly Township, Nemaha County (west)
- Harrison Township, Nemaha County (northwest)

=== Major highways ===
- K-9
