= Noble Township, Marshall County, Kansas =

Township in Marshall County, Kansas, U.S.

Noble Township
- Township
- Interactive map of Noble Township
- Coordinates: 39.703252°N 96.287829°W
- Country: United States
- State: Kansas
- County: Marshall

Area
  - Total: 35.788 sq mi (92.69 km^{2})
  - Land: 35.397 sq mi (91.68 km^{2})
  - Water: 0.391 sq mi (1.01 km^{2}) 1.09%

Population (2020)
  - Total: 157
  - Density: 4.44/sq mi (1.71/km^{2})
- Time zone: UTC-6 (CST)
  - Summer (DST): UTC-5 (CDT)
- Area code: 785

Noble Township is a township in Marshall County, Kansas, United States. As of the 2020 census, its population was 157.

== Geography ==
Noble Township covers an area of 35.788 square miles (92.69 square kilometers).

=== Communities ===
- Vermillion
- Vliets

=== Adjacent townships ===
- Lincoln Township, Marshall County (north)
- Center Township, Nemaha County (northeast)
- Home Township, Nemaha County (east)
- Neuchatel Township, Nemaha County (southeast)
- Cleveland Township, Marshall County (south)
- Clear Fork Township, Marshall County (southwest)
- Vermillion Township, Marshall County (west)
- Rock Township, Marshall County (northwest)

=== Major highways ===
- K-9
- K-87
