= Cleveland Township, Marshall County, Kansas =

Township in Marshall County, Kansas, U.S.

Cleveland Township
- Township
- Interactive map of Cleveland Township
- Coordinates: 39.608987°N 96.292377°W
- Country: United States
- State: Kansas
- County: Marshall

Area
  - Total: 35.927 sq mi (93.05 km^{2})
  - Land: 35.616 sq mi (92.25 km^{2})
  - Water: 0.311 sq mi (0.81 km^{2}) 0.87%

Population (2020)
  - Total: 68
  - Density: 1.9/sq mi (0.74/km^{2})
- Time zone: UTC-6 (CST)
  - Summer (DST): UTC-5 (CDT)
- Area code: 785

Cleveland Township is a township in Marshall County, Kansas, United States. As of the 2020 census, its population was 68.

== Geography ==
Cleveland Township covers an area of 35.927 square miles (93.05 square kilometers).

=== Communities ===
- Lillis

=== Adjacent townships ===
- Noble Township, Marshall County (north)
- Home Township, Nemaha County (northeast)
- Neuchatel Township, Nemaha County (east)
- Mill Creek Township, Pottawatomie County (southeast)
- Lone Tree Township, Pottawatomie County (south)
- Clear Creek Township, Pottawatomie County (southwest)
- Clear Fork Township, Marshall County (west)
- Vermillion Township, Marshall County (northwest)
