= Pottawatomie County Fair Pavilion =

- U.S. National Register of Historic Places
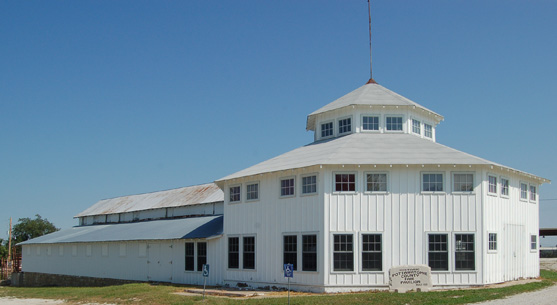

- Location within Kansas
- Location: East Ninth St., Onaga, Kansas
- Coordinates: 39°31′50″N 99°10′04″W
- Area: less than one acre
- Built: 1921
- Built by: Robert F. Hartwich
- Architect: Paul Junod
- NRHP reference No.: 03001499
- Added to NRHP: January 28, 2004

The Pottawatomie County Fair Pavilion, at the Pottawatomie County fairgrounds in Onaga, Kansas, was built in 1921. It was listed on the National Register of Historic Places in 2004.

It is believed to have been designed by Paul Amos Junod, Jr., who was a leader in organizing the Pottawatomie County Fair Association, and it is thought he was influenced by plans published for the octagonal Crystal Palace of the 1853 Exhibition of the Industry of All Nations in New York City.

It is an octagonal wood-frame barn and exhibition hall, 54 feet (16 m) in diameter, with a dome roof topped by a cupola. It is accompanied by a rectangular, one-and-a-half-story 50 by 81 feet (15 m × 25 m) livestock shed.
