= Neuchatel Township, Kansas =

Township in Nemaha County, Kansas, U.S.

Neuchatel Township
- Township
- Location within Nemaha County
- Coordinates: 39.620°N 96.183°W
- Country: United States
- State: Kansas
- County: Nemaha

Area
  - Total: 36.153 sq mi (93.64 km^{2})
  - Land: 36.03 sq mi (93.3 km^{2})
  - Water: 0.123 sq mi (0.32 km^{2}) 0.34%

Population (2020)
  - Total: 90
  - Density: 2.5/sq mi (0.96/km^{2})
- Time zone: UTC-6 (CST)
  - Summer (DST): UTC-5 (CDT)
- Area code: 785

Neuchatel Township is a township in Nemaha County, Kansas, United States.

== History ==
Neuchatel Township was originally settled chiefly by French and Swiss immigrants. It was named after Neuchâtel, in Switzerland.

== Geography ==
Neuchatel Township covers an area of 36.153 square miles (93.64 square kilometers).

=== Communities ===
- Neuchatel

=== Adjacent townships ===
- Home Township, Nemaha County (north)
- Illinois Township, Nemaha County (northeast)
- Red Vermillion Township, Nemaha County (east)
- Grant Township, Pottawatomie County (southeast)
- Mill Creek Township, Pottawatomie County (south)
- Lone Tree Township, Pottawatomie County (southwest)
- Cleveland Township, Marshall County (west)
- Noble Township, Marshall County (northwest)
