= Grant Township, Pottawatomie County, Kansas =

Township in Pottawatomie County, Kansas, U.S.

Grant Township
- Township
- Location within Pottawatomie County
- Coordinates: 39.523881°N 96.083697°W
- Country: United States
- State: Kansas
- County: Pottawatomie

Government
  - County Commissioner District 5: Terry Force

Area
  - Total: 29.805 sq mi (77.19 km^{2})
  - Land: 29.712 sq mi (76.95 km^{2})
  - Water: 0.093 sq mi (0.24 km^{2}) 0.31%

Population (2020)
  - Total: 235
  - Density: 7.91/sq mi (3.05/km^{2})
- Time zone: UTC-6 (CST)
  - Summer (DST): UTC-5 (CDT)
- Area code: 785
- GNIS feature ID: 473439

Grant Township is a township in Pottawatomie County, Kansas, United States. As of the 2020 census, its population was 235.

== Geography ==
Grant Township covers an area of 29.805 square miles (77.19 square kilometers).

=== Communities ===
- Havensville

=== Adjacent townships ===
Red Vermillion Township, Nemaha County
| Neuchatel Township, Nemaha County | northwest | north |
| Mill Creek Township, Pottawatomie County | west | self | east | Soldier Township, Jackson County |
| | | south | southeast | Grant Township, Jackson County |
Lincoln Township, Pottawatomie County

== Transportation ==
=== Major highways ===
- K-16
- K-63
