= Granada Township, Kansas =

Township in Nemaha County, Kansas, U.S.

Granada Township
- Township
- Location within Nemaha County
- Coordinates: 39.703476°N 95.838678°W
- Country: United States
- State: Kansas
- County: Nemaha

Area
  - Total: 36.061 sq mi (93.40 km^{2})
  - Land: 35.936 sq mi (93.07 km^{2})
  - Water: 0.125 sq mi (0.32 km^{2}) 0.35%

Population (2020)
  - Total: 84
  - Density: 2.3/sq mi (0.90/km^{2})
- Time zone: UTC-6 (CST)
  - Summer (DST): UTC-5 (CDT)
- Area code: 785

Granada Township is a township in Nemaha County, Kansas, United States. As of the 2020 census, its population was 84.

== Geography ==
Granada Township covers an area of 36.061 square miles (93.40 square kilometers).

=== Adjacent townships ===
- Capioma Township, Nemaha County (north)
- Powhattan Township, Brown County (east)
- Netawaka Township, Jackson County (southeast)
- Wetmore Township, Nemaha County (south)
- Reilly Township, Nemaha County (southwest)
- Harrison Township, Nemaha County (west)
- Adams Township, Nemaha County (northwest)
