= Clear Creek Township, Pottawatomie County, Kansas =

Township in Pottawatomie County, Kansas, U.S.

Clear Creek Township
- Township
- Location within Pottawatomie County
- Coordinates: 39.527285°N 96.409057°W
- Country: United States
- State: Kansas
- County: Pottawatomie
- Established: 1882

Government
  - County Commissioner District 5: Terry Force

Area
  - Total: 36.136 sq mi (93.59 km^{2})
  - Land: 36.051 sq mi (93.37 km^{2})
  - Water: 0.085 sq mi (0.22 km^{2}) 0.24%

Population (2020)
  - Total: 150
  - Density: 4.2/sq mi (1.6/km^{2})
- Time zone: UTC-6 (CST)
  - Summer (DST): UTC-5 (CDT)
- Area code: 785
- GNIS feature ID: 473414

Clear Creek Township is a township in Pottawatomie County, Kansas, United States. As of the 2020 census, its population was 150.

== History ==
Clear Creek Township was established in 1882.

== Geography ==
Clear Creek Township covers an area of 36.136 square miles (93.59 square kilometers).

=== Communities ===
- Blaine

=== Adjacent townships ===
Clear Fork Township, Marshall County
Bigelow Township, Marshall County	northwest	north	northeast	Cleveland Township, Marshall County
Spring Creek Township, Pottawatomie County	west	self	east	Lone Tree Township, Pottawatomie County
Shannon Township, Pottawatomie County	southwest	south	southeast	Sherman Township, Pottawatomie County
Rock Creek Township, Pottawatomie County

== Transportation ==
=== Major highways ===
- K-16
- K-99
