= Pottawatomie County, Kansas =

County in Kansas, United States

- County
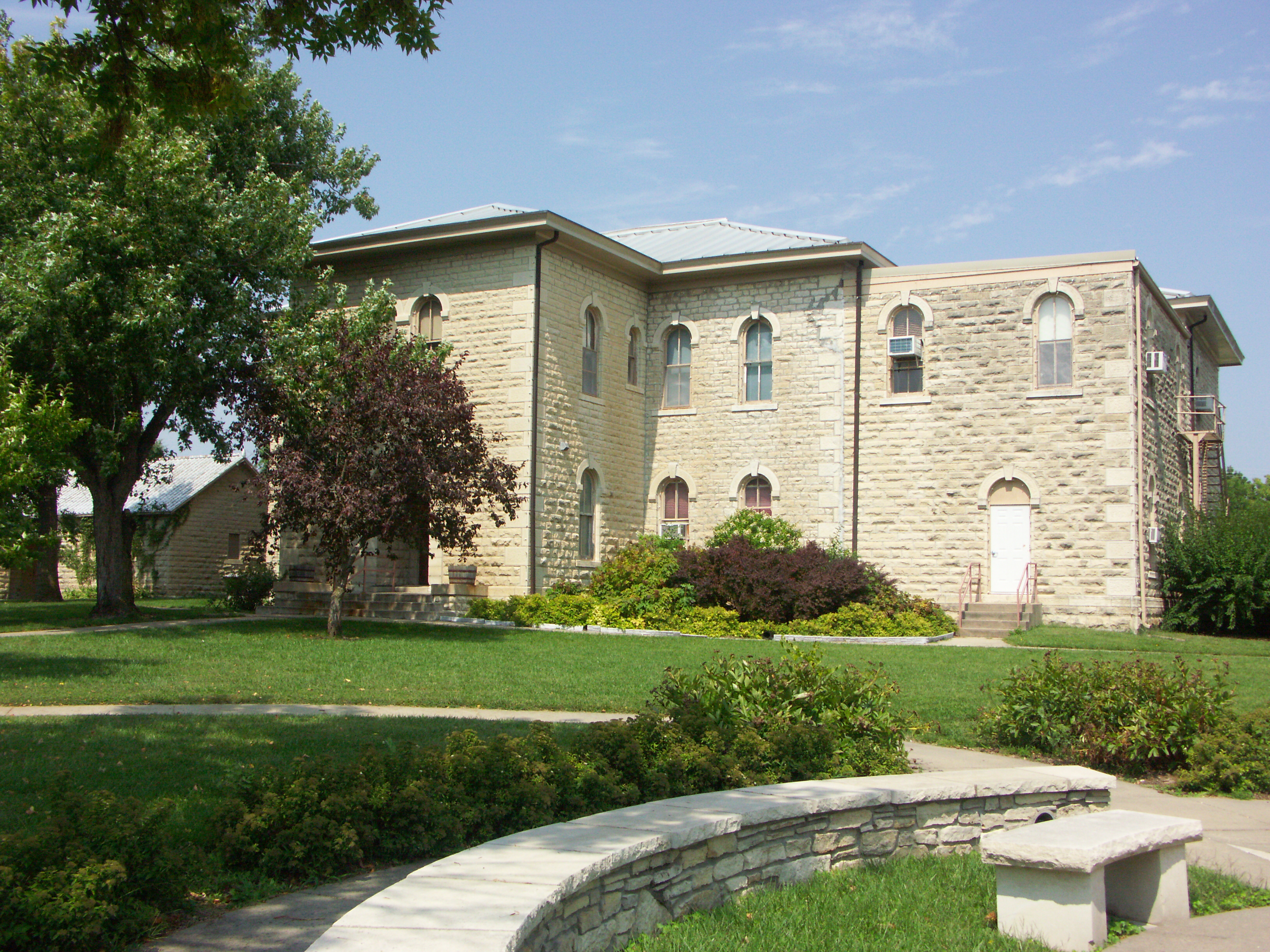
- Pottawatomie County Courthouse in Westmoreland (2009)

- Location within the U.S. state of Kansas
- Coordinates: 39°20′00″N 96°18′00″W
- Country: United States
- State: Kansas
- Founded: February 20, 1857
- Named for: Potawatomi tribe
- Seat: Westmoreland
- Largest city: Manhattan

Area
  - Total: 862 sq mi (2,230 km^{2})
  - Land: 841 sq mi (2,180 km^{2})
  - Water: 21 sq mi (54 km^{2}) 2.4%

Population (2020)
  - Total: 25,348
  - Estimate (2025): 27,186 ▲
  - Density: 30.1/sq mi (11.6/km^{2})
- Time zone: UTC−6 (Central)
  - Summer (DST): UTC−5 (CDT)
- Congressional district: 1st
- Website: pottcounty.org

Pottawatomie County is a county located in the U.S. state of Kansas. Its county seat is Westmoreland. As of the 2020 census, the county population was 25,348. The county was named for the Potawatomi tribe.

== History ==
=== Early history ===
For millennia, the Great Plains of North America were inhabited by nomadic Native Americans. From the 16th to 18th centuries, the Kingdom of France claimed ownership of large parts of North America. In 1762, after the French and Indian War, France secretly ceded New France to Spain, by the Treaty of Fontainebleau.

=== 19th century ===
In 1802, Spain returned most of the land to France, keeping title to about 7,500 square miles. In 1803, most of the land for modern day Kansas was acquired by the United States from France as part of the 828,000 square mile Louisiana Purchase.

In 1854, the Kansas Territory was organized under the provisions of the Kansas–Nebraska Act, then in 1861 Kansas became the 34th U.S. state.

In 1857, Pottawatomie County was established by the Kansas Territorial legislature, out of land formerly included in Riley County. The present county seat of Westmoreland was selected by a vote held in 1882.

== Geography ==
According to the U.S. Census Bureau, the county has a total area of 862 square miles (2,230 km^{2}), of which 841 square miles (2,180 km^{2}) is land and 21 square miles (54 km^{2}) (2.4%) is water.

=== Adjacent counties ===
- Marshall County (north)
- Nemaha County (northeast)
- Jackson County (east)
- Shawnee County (southeast)
- Wabaunsee County (south)
- Riley County (west)

== Demographics ==
Historical population
Census	Pop.	Note	%±
1860	1,529		—
1870	7,848		413.3%
1880	16,350		108.3%
1890	17,722		8.4%
1900	18,470		4.2%
1910	17,522		−5.1%
1920	16,154		−7.8%
1930	15,862		−1.8%
1940	14,015		−11.6%
1950	12,344		−11.9%
1960	11,957		−3.1%
1970	11,755		−1.7%
1980	14,782		25.8%
1990	16,128		9.1%
2000	18,209		12.9%
2010	21,604		18.6%
2020	25,348		17.3%
2025 (est.)	27,186	▲	7.3%
U.S. Decennial Census; 1790-1960 1900-1990; 1990-2000 2010-2020

Pottawatomie County is part of the Manhattan metropolitan area.

=== Racial and ethnic composition ===
Pottawatomie County, Kansas – Racial and ethnic composition Note: the U.S. Census treats Hispanic/Latino as an ethnic category. This table excludes Latinos from the racial categories and assigns them to a separate category. Hispanics/Latinos may be of any race.
Race / Ethnicity (NH = Non-Hispanic)	Pop 1980	Pop 1990	Pop 2000	Pop 2010	Pop 2020	% 1980	% 1990	% 2000	% 2010	% 2020
White alone (NH)	14,504	15,632	17,288	19,690	22,065	98.12%	96.92%	94.94%	91.14%	87.05%
Black or African American alone (NH)	27	93	119	214	271	0.18%	0.58%	0.65%	0.99%	1.07%
Native American or Alaska Native alone (NH)	51	101	89	130	109	0.35%	0.63%	0.49%	0.60%	0.43%
Asian alone (NH)	55	61	57	143	194	0.37%	0.38%	0.31%	0.66%	0.77%
Native Hawaiian or Pacific Islander alone (NH)	x	x	1	11	27	x	x	0.01%	0.05%	0.11%
Other race alone (NH)	11	2	12	17	70	0.07%	0.01%	0.07%	0.08%	0.28%
Mixed race or Multiracial (NH)	x	x	232	442	1,183	x	x	1.27%	2.05%	4.67%
Hispanic or Latino (any race)	134	239	411	957	1,429	0.91%	1.48%	2.26%	4.43%	5.64%
Total	14,782	16,128	18,209	21,604	25,348	100.00%	100.00%	100.00%	100.00%	100.00%

=== 2020 census ===
As of the 2020 census, the county had a population of 25,348. The median age was 36.0 years. 29.4% of residents were under the age of 18 and 15.1% of residents were 65 years of age or older. For every 100 females there were 98.7 males, and for every 100 females age 18 and over there were 97.8 males age 18 and over.

The racial makeup of the county was 89.2% White, 1.1% Black or African American, 0.6% American Indian and Alaska Native, 0.8% Asian, 0.1% Native Hawaiian and Pacific Islander, 1.2% from some other race, and 7.0% from two or more races. Hispanic or Latino residents of any race comprised 5.6% of the population.

34.5% of residents lived in urban areas, while 65.5% lived in rural areas.

There were 9,050 households in the county, of which 37.0% had children under the age of 18 living with them and 19.0% had a female householder with no spouse or partner present. About 22.9% of all households were made up of individuals and 10.1% had someone living alone who was 65 years of age or older.

There were 9,866 housing units, of which 8.3% were vacant. Among occupied housing units, 78.7% were owner-occupied and 21.3% were renter-occupied. The homeowner vacancy rate was 2.0% and the rental vacancy rate was 10.6%.

=== 2000 census ===
As of the census of 2000, there were 18,209 people, 6,771 households, and 4,929 families residing in the county. The population density was 22 people per square mile (8.5 people/km^{2}). There were 7,311 housing units at an average density of 9 per square mile (3.5/km^{2}). The racial makeup of the county was 96.32% White, 0.66% Black or African American, 0.59% Native American, 0.32% Asian, 0.01% Pacific Islander, 0.60% from other races, and 1.50% from two or more races. 2.26% of the population were Hispanic or Latino of any race.

There were 6,771 households, out of which 36.40% had children under the age of 18 living with them, 62.40% were married couples living together, 7.20% had a female householder with no husband present, and 27.20% were non-families. 23.20% of all households were made up of individuals, and 9.70% had someone living alone who was 65 years of age or older. The average household size was 2.65 and the average family size was 3.15.

In the county, the population was spread out, with 29.50% under the age of 18, 7.70% from 18 to 24, 27.70% from 25 to 44, 21.60% from 45 to 64, and 13.50% who were 65 years of age or older. The median age was 36 years. For every 100 females, there were 98.00 males. For every 100 females age 18 and over, there were 96.70 males.

The median income for a household in the county was $40,176, and the median income for a family was $47,261. Males had a median income of $31,368 versus $23,238 for females. The per capita income for the county was $17,785. About 6.40% of families and 9.70% of the population were below the poverty line, including 14.10% of those under age 18 and 10.30% of those age 65 or over.

== Government ==
=== Presidential elections ===
Presidential election results

United States presidential election results for Pottawatomie County, Kansas
Year	Republican		Democratic		Third party(ies)	
Year	No.	%	No.	%	No.	%
1888	2,419	58.94%	1,471	35.84%	214	5.21%
1892	2,107	49.80%	0	0.00%	2,124	50.20%
1896	2,308	49.95%	2,276	49.25%	37	0.80%
1900	2,556	56.41%	1,929	42.57%	46	1.02%
1904	2,632	69.85%	1,045	27.73%	91	2.42%
1908	2,650	60.78%	1,680	38.53%	30	0.69%
1912	1,058	25.09%	1,599	37.93%	1,559	36.98%
1916	3,688	55.66%	2,834	42.77%	104	1.57%
1920	4,481	76.95%	1,293	22.21%	49	0.84%
1924	4,340	68.28%	1,471	23.14%	545	8.57%
1928	4,451	65.30%	2,341	34.35%	24	0.35%
1932	3,339	45.45%	3,910	53.23%	97	1.32%
1936	3,977	53.76%	3,284	44.39%	137	1.85%
1940	5,045	69.12%	2,226	30.50%	28	0.38%
1944	4,074	70.01%	1,727	29.68%	18	0.31%
1948	3,709	62.64%	2,167	36.60%	45	0.76%
1952	4,944	77.94%	1,387	21.87%	12	0.19%
1956	4,335	74.97%	1,422	24.59%	25	0.43%
1960	3,666	63.16%	2,125	36.61%	13	0.22%
1964	2,606	51.40%	2,432	47.97%	32	0.63%
1968	3,267	63.68%	1,368	26.67%	495	9.65%
1972	3,947	73.51%	1,298	24.18%	124	2.31%
1976	3,483	59.06%	2,316	39.27%	98	1.66%
1980	3,895	63.40%	1,724	28.06%	525	8.54%
1984	4,598	71.09%	1,798	27.80%	72	1.11%
1988	3,897	59.51%	2,544	38.85%	108	1.65%
1992	3,106	38.87%	2,099	26.27%	2,785	34.86%
1996	4,504	58.16%	1,997	25.79%	1,243	16.05%
2000	4,985	64.48%	2,037	26.35%	709	9.17%
2004	6,326	71.70%	2,176	24.66%	321	3.64%
2008	6,929	70.15%	2,599	26.31%	349	3.53%
2012	6,804	71.78%	2,335	24.63%	340	3.59%
2016	7,612	71.19%	2,225	20.81%	856	8.01%
2020	9,452	72.25%	3,313	25.32%	318	2.43%
2024	9,811	72.83%	3,394	25.19%	267	1.98%

Typical of rural Kansas, Pottawatomie County is mostly Republican. The only Democratic presidential candidate to gain a majority in Pottawatomie County has been Franklin D. Roosevelt in 1932, while since 1940 only Lyndon Johnson in 1964 has received so much as forty percent of the county's vote.

=== Laws ===
Pottawatomie County was a prohibition, or "dry", county until the Kansas Constitution was amended in 1986 and voters approved the sale of alcoholic liquor by the individual drink with a 30% food sales requirement.

== Education ==
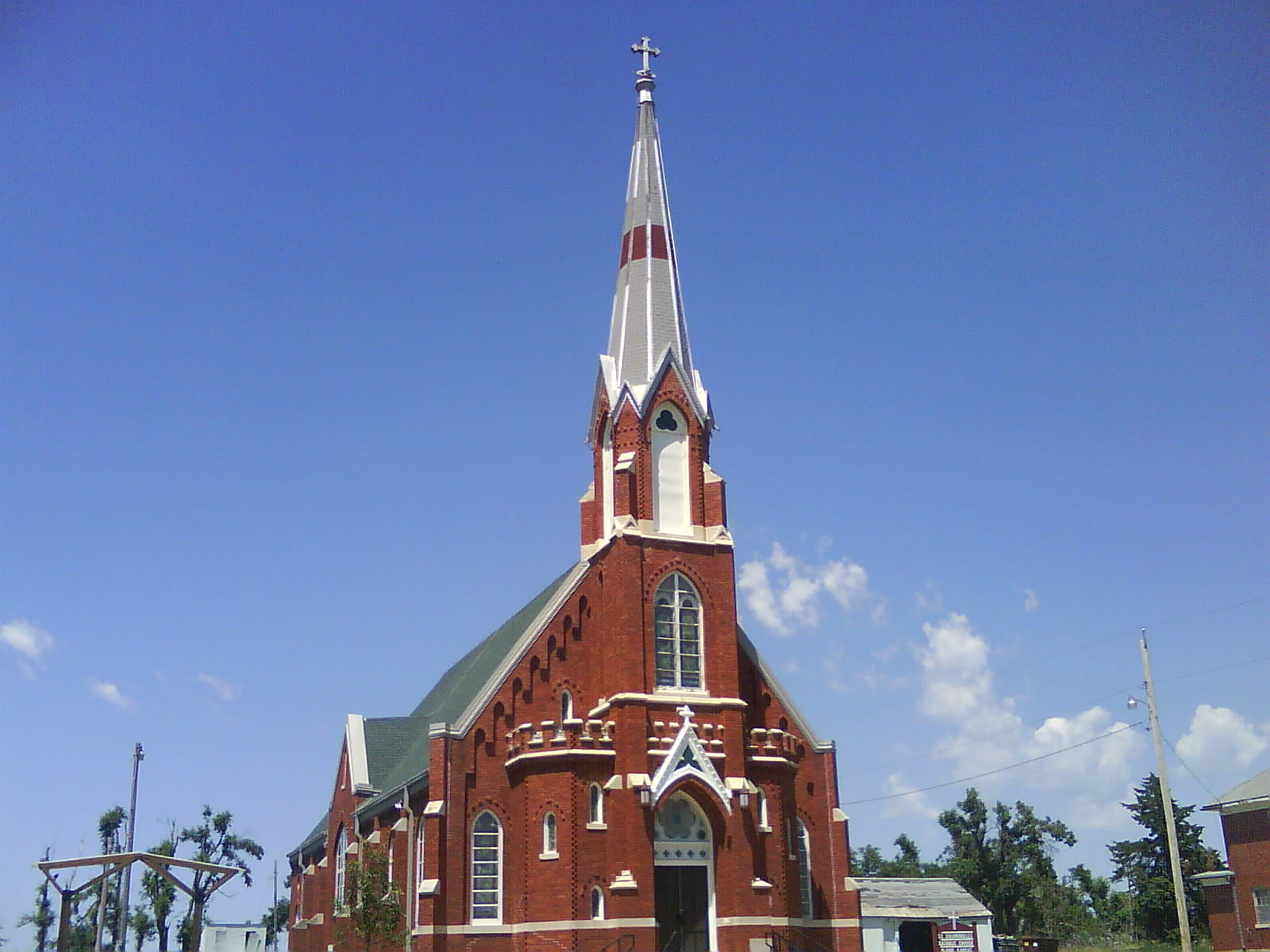
St. Columbkillane (Colmcille) Church in Blaine

=== Unified school districts ===
The Unified School Districts that serve Pottawatomie County include:

- Wamego USD 320
- Kaw Valley USD 321
- Onaga USD 322
- Rock Creek USD 323

School district office in neighboring county

- Riley County USD 378
- Manhattan–Ogden USD 383
- Blue Valley USD 384
- Valley Heights USD 498
- Vermillion USD 380

=== Private schools ===
- St. Marys Academy & College (St. Marys)
- Flint Hills Christian School (Manhattan)

== Communities ==
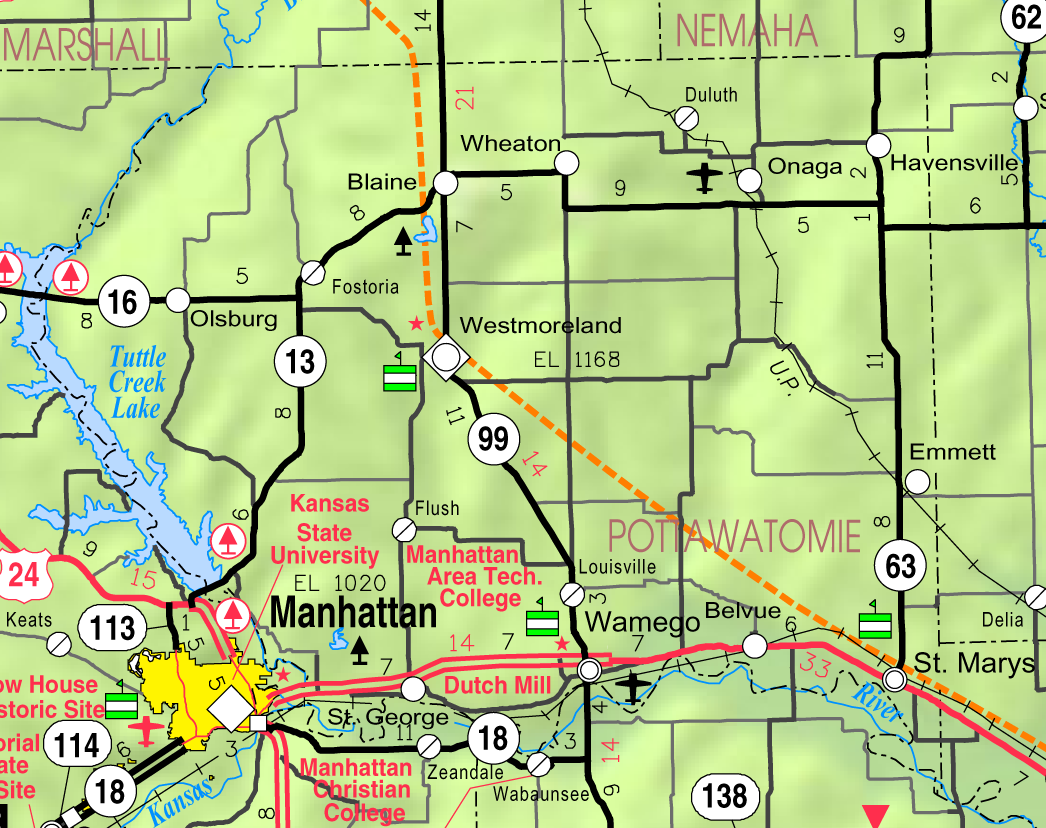
2005 map of Pottawatomie County (map legend)

List of townships / incorporated cities / unincorporated communities / extinct former communities within Pottawatomie County.

=== Cities ===
‡ means a community has portions in an adjacent county.

- Belvue
- Emmett
- Havensville
- Louisville
- Manhattan‡ (most in Riley County)
- Olsburg
- Onaga
- St. George
- St. Marys‡
- Wamego
- Westmoreland (county seat)
- Wheaton

=== Unincorporated communities ===
- Blaine
- Duluth
- Flush
- Fostoria
- Saint Clere
- Swamp Angel

=== Former communities ===
Prior to the creation of Tuttle Creek Lake, the community of Garrison existed in west central Pottawatomie County.

=== Townships ===
Pottawatomie County is divided into twenty-three townships. The city of Manhattan is considered governmentally independent and is excluded from the census figures for the townships. In the following table, the population center is the largest city (or cities) included in that township's population total, if it is of a significant size.

Sources: 2000 U.S. Gazetteer from the U.S. Census Bureau.
Township	FIPS	Population center	Population	Population density /km^{2} (/sq mi)	Land area km^{2} (sq mi)	Water area km^{2} (sq mi)	Water %	Geographic coordinates
Belvue	05950		404	4 (11)	96 (37)	1 (0)	1.05%	39°14′7″N 96°11′21″W
Blue	07550		1,802	16 (41)	114 (44)	14 (5)	10.66%	39°13′44″N 96°31′49″W
Blue Valley	07725		339	3 (8)	115 (44)	13 (5)	9.95%	39°26′22″N 96°38′6″W
Center	12000		104	1 (3)	78 (30)	0 (0)	0.04%	39°21′4″N 96°14′10″W
Clear Creek	13800		113	1 (3)	93 (36)	0 (0)	0.03%	39°31′6″N 96°23′36″W
Emmett	21125		478	6 (16)	77 (30)	0 (0)	0.61%	39°18′11″N 96°3′46″W
Grant	27950		293	4 (10)	77 (30)	0 (0)	0%	39°31′27″N 96°5′4″W
Green	28450		188	2 (4)	125 (48)	14 (5)	9.91%	39°21′14″N 96°36′6″W
Lincoln	41000		124	2 (4)	77 (30)	0 (0)	0.18%	39°25′37″N 96°3′26″W
Lone Tree	42550		239	3 (7)	93 (36)	0 (0)	0%	39°30′54″N 96°18′18″W
Louisville	42950		735	8 (20)	95 (37)	0 (0)	0.04%	39°15′40″N 96°19′10″W
Mill Creek	46700		1,000	9 (24)	108 (42)	0 (0)	0%	39°30′11″N 96°10′50″W
Pottawatomie	57250		499	3 (8)	155 (60)	0 (0)	0.02%	39°20′5″N 96°26′26″W
Rock Creek	60625		653	7 (18)	93 (36)	0 (0)	0.19%	39°25′41″N 96°24′10″W
St. Clere	62150		83	1 (3)	77 (30)	0 (0)	0.21%	39°21′36″N 96°5′30″W
St. George	62225		2,629	30 (79)	87 (33)	1 (1)	1.69%	39°11′46″N 96°24′56″W
St. Marys	62425		2,789	28 (73)	99 (38)	1 (0)	0.60%	39°11′58″N 96°4′19″W
Shannon	64300		235	2 (6)	104 (40)	0 (0)	0.08%	39°26′19″N 96°30′50″W
Sherman	65050		126	1 (3)	94 (36)	0 (0)	0.02%	39°25′54″N 96°17′29″W
Spring Creek	67475		61	1 (2)	103 (40)	0 (0)	0.08%	39°31′50″N 96°31′19″W
Union	72250		164	2 (5)	94 (36)	0 (0)	0.03%	39°20′20″N 96°19′34″W
Vienna	73875		92	1 (3)	78 (30)	0 (0)	0.03%	39°25′40″N 96°10′28″W
Wamego	75350		5,056	100 (260)	50 (19)	2 (1)	3.20%	39°12′19″N 96°18′20″W

== See also ==
- National Register of Historic Places listings in Pottawatomie County, Kansas

Community information for Kansas

- Kansas locations by per capita income
- List of counties in Kansas
- List of townships in Kansas
- List of cities in Kansas
- List of unincorporated communities in Kansas
- List of ghost towns in Kansas
