= Whiting Township, Kansas =

Whiting Township
- Township
- Location in Jackson County
- Coordinates: 39°36′10″N 95°35′51″W
- Country: United States
- State: Kansas
- County: Jackson

Area
  - Total: 36.00 sq mi (93.23 km^{2})
  - Land: 35.96 sq mi (93.13 km^{2})
  - Water: 0.042 sq mi (0.11 km^{2}) 0.12%
- Elevation: 1,020 ft (311 m)

Population (2020)
  - Total: 319
  - Density: 8.87/sq mi (3.43/km^{2})
- GNIS feature ID: 0473239

Whiting Township is a township in Jackson County, Kansas, United States. As of the 2020 census, its population was 319.

== History ==
Whiting Township was formed in 1872.

== Geography ==
Whiting Township covers an area of 36 square miles (93.23 square kilometers); of this, 0.04 square miles (0.11 square kilometers) or 0.12 percent is water. The stream of Muddy Creek runs through this township.

=== Communities ===
- Whiting

=== Adjacent townships ===
- Horton Township, Brown County (northeast)
- Mission Township, Brown County (northeast)
- Grasshopper Township, Atchison County (east)
- Straight Creek Township (south)
- Liberty Township (southwest)
- Netawaka Township (west)
- Powhattan Township, Brown County (northwest)

=== Cemeteries ===
The township contains one cemetery, Spring Hill.

=== Major highway ===
- K-9
