= St. George Township, Kansas =

Township in Pottawatomie County, Kansas, U.S.

St. George Township
- Township
- Location within Pottawatomie County
- Coordinates: 39.220049°N 96.403143°W
- Country: United States
- State: Kansas
- County: Pottawatomie
- Established: 1882

Government
  - County Commissioner District 4: Gary Yenzer

Area
  - Total: 33.938 sq mi (87.90 km^{2})
  - Land: 33.387 sq mi (86.47 km^{2})
  - Water: 0.551 sq mi (1.43 km^{2}) 1.62%

Population (2020)
  - Total: 4,494
  - Density: 134.6/sq mi (51.97/km^{2})
- Time zone: UTC-6 (CST)
  - Summer (DST): UTC-5 (CDT)
- Area code: 785
- GNIS feature ID: 476234

St. George Township is a township in Pottawatomie County, Kansas, United States. As of the 2020 census, its population was 4,494.

== History ==
St. George Township was established in 1882.

== Geography ==
St. George Township covers an area of 33.938 square miles (87.90 square kilometers). The Kansas River flows through it.

=== Communities ===
- St. George

=== Adjacent townships ===
Pottawatomie Township, Pottawatomie County
		north	northeast	Louisville Township, Pottawatomie County
Blue Township, Pottawatomie County	west	self	east	Wamego Township, Pottawatomie County
		south	southeast	Wabaunsee Township, Wabaunsee County
Zeandale Township, Riley County

== Transportation ==
=== Major highways ===
- US-24
