= George and Virginia Trout House =

Historic house in Kansas, United States

- U.S. National Register of Historic Places
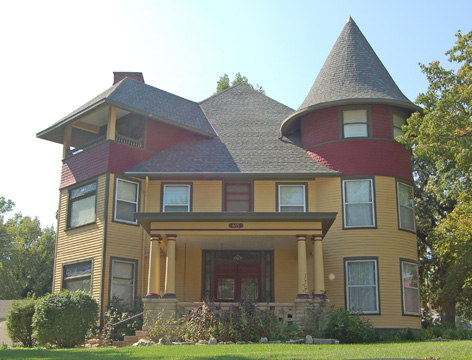
- The George and Virginia Trout House in 2014

- Location within Kansas
- Location: 615 Elm Street, Wamego, Kansas, U.S.
- Coordinates: 39°12′16″N 96°18′23″W
- Built: 1896
- Built by: Francis M. Spencer
- Architectural style: Queen Anne
- NRHP reference No.: 13001043
- Added to NRHP: January 8, 2014

The George and Virginia Trout House is a historic house in Wamego, Kansas, U.S., that was built in 1896. It was designed in the Queen Anne style architectural style. It has been listed on the National Register of Historic Places since January 8, 2014.
