= Center Township, Pottawatomie County, Kansas =

Township in Pottawatomie County, Kansas, U.S.

Center Township
- Township
- Location within Pottawatomie County
- Coordinates: 39.343654°N 96.233074°W
- Country: United States
- State: Kansas
- County: Pottawatomie
- Established: 1882

Government
  - County Commissioner District 5: Terry Force

Area
  - Total: 29.999 sq mi (77.70 km^{2})
  - Land: 29.926 sq mi (77.51 km^{2})
  - Water: 0.063 sq mi (0.16 km^{2}) 0.21%

Population (2020)
  - Total: 138
  - Density: 4.61/sq mi (1.78/km^{2})
- Time zone: UTC-6 (CST)
  - Summer (DST): UTC-5 (CDT)
- Area code: 785
- GNIS feature ID: 476115

Center Township is a township in Pottawatomie County, Kansas, United States. As of the 2020 census, its population was 138.

== History ==
Center Township was established in 1882.

== Geography ==
Center Township covers an area of 29.999 square miles (77.70 square kilometers).

=== Adjacent townships ===
Vienna Township, Pottawatomie County
Sherman Township, Pottawatomie County	northwest	north	northeast	St. Clere Township, Pottawatomie County
Union Township, Pottawatomie County	west	self
Louisville Township, Pottawatomie County	southwest	south	southeast	Emmett Township, Pottawatomie County
Belvue Township, Pottawatomie County
