= Reilly Township, Kansas =

Township in Nemaha County, Kansas, U.S.

Reilly Township
- Township
- Location within Nemaha County
- Coordinates: 39.605729°N 95.948427°W
- Country: United States
- State: Kansas
- County: Nemaha

Area
  - Total: 36.067 sq mi (93.41 km^{2})
  - Land: 35.988 sq mi (93.21 km^{2})
  - Water: 0.079 sq mi (0.20 km^{2}) 0.22%

Population (2020)
  - Total: 107
  - Density: 2.97/sq mi (1.15/km^{2})
- Time zone: UTC-6 (CST)
  - Summer (DST): UTC-5 (CDT)
- Area code: 785

Reilly Township is a township in Nemaha County, Kansas, United States. As of the 2020 census, its population was 107.

== Geography ==
Reilly Township covers an area of 36.067 square miles (93.41 square kilometers).

=== Adjacent townships ===
- Harrison Township, Nemaha County (north)
- Granada Township, Nemaha County (northeast)
- Wetmore Township, Nemaha County (east)
- Jefferson Township, Jackson County (southeast)
- Soldier Township, Jackson County (south)
- Red Vermillion Township, Nemaha County (west)
- Illinois Township, Nemaha County (northwest)

=== Major highways ===
- K-9
- K-62
