= Sherman Township, Pottawatomie County, Kansas =

Township in Pottawatomie County, Kansas, U.S.

Sherman Township
- Township
- Location within Pottawatomie County
- Coordinates: 39.433453°N 96.294582°W
- Country: United States
- State: Kansas
- County: Pottawatomie
- Established: 1882

Government
  - County Commissioner District 5: Terry Force

Area
  - Total: 36.05 sq mi (93.4 km^{2})
  - Land: 35.96 sq mi (93.1 km^{2})
  - Water: 0.09 sq mi (0.23 km^{2}) 0.25%

Population (2020)
  - Total: 126
  - Density: 3.50/sq mi (1.35/km^{2})
- Time zone: UTC-6 (CST)
  - Summer (DST): UTC-5 (CDT)
- Area code: 785
- GNIS feature ID: 476105

Sherman Township is a township in Pottawatomie County, Kansas, United States. As of the 2020 census, its population was 126.

== History ==
Sherman Township was established in 1882. Shannon Township is home to the extinct town of Vienna. Its post office was in operation from 1862–1883, and at its peak in 1868 it was home to 160 people.

== Geography ==
Sherman Township covers an area of 36.05 square miles (93.4 square kilometers).

=== Adjacent townships ===
Lone Tree Township, Pottawatomie County
Clear Creek Township, Pottawatomie County	northwest	north	northeast	Mill Creek Township, Pottawatomie County
Rock Creek Township, Pottawatomie County	west	self	east	Vienna Township, Pottawatomie County
		south	southeast	Center Township, Pottawatomie County
Union Township, Pottawatomie County

== Transportation ==
=== Major highways ===
- K-16
