= Wamego Township, Kansas =

Township in Pottawatomie County, Kansas, U.S.

Wamego Township
- Township
- Location within Pottawatomie County
- Coordinates: 39.206362°N 96.29915°W
- Country: United States
- State: Kansas
- County: Pottawatomie
- Established: 1882

Government
  - County Commissioner District 2: Merl Page

Area
  - Total: 20.096 sq mi (52.05 km^{2})
  - Land: 19.492 sq mi (50.48 km^{2})
  - Water: 0.604 sq mi (1.56 km^{2}) 3.01%

Population (2020)
  - Total: 5,670
  - Density: 291/sq mi (112/km^{2})
- Time zone: UTC-6 (CST)
  - Summer (DST): UTC-5 (CDT)
- Area code: 785
- GNIS feature ID: 476425

Wamego Township is a township in Pottawatomie County, Kansas, United States. As of the 2020 census, its population was 5,670.

== History ==
Wamego Township was established in 1882.

== Geography ==
Wamego Township covers an area of 20.096 square miles (52.05 square kilometers). It is the smallest township in the county. The Kansas River flows through it.

=== Communities ===
- part of Wamego

=== Adjacent townships ===
Louisville Township, Pottawatomie County
		north
St. George Township, Pottawatomie County	west	self	east	Belvue Township, Pottawatomie County
		south	southeast	Kaw Township, Wabaunsee County
Wabaunsee Township, Wabaunsee County

== Transportation ==
=== Major highways ===
- US-24
- K-99
