= Spring Creek Township, Pottawatomie County, Kansas =

Township in Pottawatomie County, Kansas, U.S.

Spring Creek Township
- Township
- Location within Pottawatomie County
- Coordinates: 39.521534°N 96.521291°W
- Country: United States
- State: Kansas
- County: Pottawatomie

Government
  - County Commissioner District 5: Terry Force

Area
  - Total: 39.736 sq mi (102.92 km^{2})
  - Land: 39.578 sq mi (102.51 km^{2})
  - Water: 0.158 sq mi (0.41 km^{2}) 0.40%

Population (2020)
  - Total: 55
  - Density: 1.4/sq mi (0.54/km^{2})
- Time zone: UTC-6 (CST)
  - Summer (DST): UTC-5 (CDT)
- Area code: 785
- GNIS feature ID: 473411

Spring Creek Township is a township in Pottawatomie County, Kansas, United States. As of the 2020 census, its population was 55.

== Geography ==
Spring Creek Township covers an area of 39.736 square miles (102.92 square kilometers). The Big Blue River flows through it.

=== Adjacent townships ===
Bigelow Township, Marshall County
Swede Creek Township, Riley County	northwest	north	northeast	Clear Fork Township, Marshall County
Blue Valley Township, Pottawatomie County	west	self	east	Clear Creek Township, Pottawatomie County
		south	southeast	Rock Creek Township, Pottawatomie County
Shannon Township, Pottawatomie County
