= Belvue Township, Kansas =

Township in Pottawatomie County, Kansas, U.S.

Belvue Township
- Township
- Location within Pottawatomie County
- Coordinates: 39.252916°N 96.189482°W
- Country: United States
- State: Kansas
- County: Pottawatomie

Government
  - District 3 Commissioner: Bill Drew

Area
  - Total: 37.687 sq mi (97.61 km^{2})
  - Land: 36.459 sq mi (94.43 km^{2})
  - Water: 1.228 sq mi (3.18 km^{2}) 3.26%
- Elevation: 1,050 ft (320 m)

Population (2020)
  - Total: 392
  - Density: 10.8/sq mi (4.15/km^{2})
- Time zone: UTC-6 (CST)
  - Summer (DST): UTC-5 (CDT)
- Area code: 785
- GNIS feature ID: 476245

Belvue Township is a township in Pottawatomie County, Kansas, United States. As of the 2020 census, its population was 392.

== Geography ==
Belvue Township covers an area of 37.687 square miles (97.61 square kilometers). The Kansas River flows through it.

=== Communities ===
- Belvue

=== Adjacent townships ===
Center Township, Pottawatomie County
		north	northeast	Emmett Township, Pottawatomie County
Louisville Township, Pottawatomie County	west	self	east	St. Marys Township, Pottawatomie County
Wamego Township, Pottawatomie County	southwest	south
Kaw Township, Wabaunsee County

== Transportation ==
=== Major highways ===
- US-24
