= Rock Creek Township, Pottawatomie County, Kansas =

Township in Pottawatomie County, Kansas, U.S.

Rock Creek Township
- Township
- Location within Pottawatomie County
- Coordinates: 39.43552°N 96.40756°W
- Country: United States
- State: Kansas
- County: Pottawatomie
- Established: 1882

Government
  - County Commissioner District 5: Terry Force

Area
  - Total: 36.098 sq mi (93.49 km^{2})
  - Land: 35.971 sq mi (93.16 km^{2})
  - Water: 0.127 sq mi (0.33 km^{2}) 0.35%

Population (2020)
  - Total: 691
  - Density: 19.2/sq mi (7.42/km^{2})
- Time zone: UTC-6 (CST)
  - Summer (DST): UTC-5 (CDT)
- Area code: 785
- GNIS feature ID: 476087

Rock Creek Township is a township in Pottawatomie County, Kansas, United States. As of the 2020 census, its population was 691.

== History ==
Rock Creek Township was established in 1882.

== Geography ==
Rock Creek Township covers an area of 36.098 square miles (93.49 square kilometers).

=== Communities ===
- part of Westmoreland

=== Adjacent townships ===
Clear Creek Township, Pottawatomie County
Spring Creek Township, Pottawatomie County	northwest	north	northeast	Lone Tree Township, Pottawatomie County
Shannon Township, Pottawatomie County	west	self	east	Sherman Township, Pottawatomie County
Pottawatomie Township, Pottawatomie County	southwest		southeast	Union Township, Pottawatomie County

== Transportation ==
=== Major highways ===
- K-16
- K-99
