= Shannon Township, Pottawatomie County, Kansas =

Township in Pottawatomie County, Kansas, U.S.

Shannon Township
- Township
- Location within Pottawatomie County
- Coordinates: 39.432132°N 96.529331°W
- Country: United States
- State: Kansas
- County: Pottawatomie
- Established: 1882

Government
  - County Commissioner District 5: Terry Force

Area
  - Total: 40.060 sq mi (103.75 km^{2})
  - Land: 39.953 sq mi (103.48 km^{2})
  - Water: 0.107 sq mi (0.28 km^{2}) 0.27%

Population (2020)
  - Total: 256
  - Density: 6.41/sq mi (2.47/km^{2})
- Time zone: UTC-6 (CST)
  - Summer (DST): UTC-5 (CDT)
- Area code: 785
- GNIS feature ID: 476084

Shannon Township is a township in Pottawatomie County, Kansas, United States. As of the 2020 census, its population was 256.

== History ==
Shannon Township was established in 1882. Shannon Township is home to three extinct towns, Adams Peak (Post office in operation 1870–1884), Otter Lake (1870–1886), and Springside (1870–1902).

== Geography ==
Shannon Township covers an area of 40.060 square miles (103.75 square kilometers).

=== Communities ===
- Fostoria

=== Adjacent townships ===
Spring Creek Township, Pottawatomie County
		north	northeast	Clear Creek Township, Pottawatomie County
Blue Valley Township, Pottawatomie County	west	self	east	Rock Creek Township, Pottawatomie County
Green Township, Pottawatomie County	southwest		southeast	Pottawatomie Township, Pottawatomie County

== Transportation ==
=== Major highways ===
- K-13
- K-16
