= Clear Fork Township, Kansas =

Township in Marshall County, Kansas, U.S.

Clear Fork Township
- Township
- Interactive map of Clear Fork Township
- Coordinates: 39.602561°N 96.398617°W
- Country: United States
- State: Kansas
- County: Marshall

Area
  - Total: 35.97 sq mi (93.2 km^{2})
  - Land: 35.829 sq mi (92.80 km^{2})
  - Water: 0.141 sq mi (0.37 km^{2}) 0.39%

Population (2020)
  - Total: 42
  - Density: 1.2/sq mi (0.45/km^{2})
- Time zone: UTC-6 (CST)
  - Summer (DST): UTC-5 (CDT)
- Area code: 785

Clear Fork Township is a township in Marshall County, Kansas, United States. As of the 2020 census, its population was 42.

== Geography ==
Clear Fork Township covers an area of 35.97 square miles (93.2 square kilometers).

=== Adjacent townships ===
- Vermillion Township, Marshall County (north)
- Noble Township, Marshall County (northeast)
- Cleveland Township, Marshall County (east)
- Lone Tree Township, Pottawatomie County (southeast)
- Clear Creek Township, Pottawatomie County (south)
- Spring Creek Township, Pottawatomie County (southwest)
- Bigelow Township, Marshall County (west)
- Wells Township, Marshall County (northwest)

=== Major highways ===
- K-99
