= Lone Tree Township, Pottawatomie County, Kansas =

Township in Pottawatomie County, Kansas, U.S.

Lone Tree Township
- Township
- Location within Pottawatomie County
- Coordinates: 39.525326°N 96.292101°W
- Country: United States
- State: Kansas
- County: Pottawatomie
- Established: 1882

Government
  - County Commissioner District 5: Terry Force

Area
  - Total: 36.038 sq mi (93.34 km^{2})
  - Land: 35.967 sq mi (93.15 km^{2})
  - Water: 0.071 sq mi (0.18 km^{2}) 0.20%

Population (2020)
  - Total: 227
  - Density: 6.31/sq mi (2.44/km^{2})
- Time zone: UTC-6 (CST)
  - Summer (DST): UTC-5 (CDT)
- Area code: 785
- GNIS feature ID: 473428

Lone Tree Township is a township in Pottawatomie County, Kansas, United States. As of the 2020 census, its population was 227.

== History ==
Lone Tree Township was established in 1882.

== Geography ==
Lone Tree Township covers an area of 36.038 square miles (93.34 square kilometers).

=== Communities ===
- Wheaton

=== Adjacent townships ===
Cleveland Township, Marshall County
Clear Fork Township, Marshall County	northwest	north	northeast	Neuchatel Township, Nemaha County
Clear Creek Township, Pottawatomie County	west	self	east	Mill Creek Township, Pottawatomie County
Rock Creek Township, Pottawatomie County	southwest	south
Sherman Township, Pottawatomie County

== Transportation ==
=== Major highways ===
- K-16
