= Liberty Township, Jackson County, Kansas =

Liberty Township
- Township
- Location in Jackson County
- Coordinates: 39°31′35″N 95°43′16″W
- Country: United States
- State: Kansas
- County: Jackson

Area
  - Total: 35.43 sq mi (91.76 km^{2})
  - Land: 35.37 sq mi (91.61 km^{2})
  - Water: 0.054 sq mi (0.14 km^{2}) 0.15%
- Elevation: 1,122 ft (342 m)

Population (2020)
  - Total: 539
  - Density: 15.2/sq mi (5.88/km^{2})
- GNIS feature ID: 0473454

Liberty Township is a township in Jackson County, Kansas, United States. As of the 2020 census, its population was 539.

== History ==
Liberty Township was formed in 1872.

== Geography ==
Liberty Township covers an area of 35.43 square miles (91.76 square kilometers); of this, 0.06 square miles (0.14 square kilometers) or 0.15 percent is water. The stream of Spring Creek runs through this township.

=== Adjacent townships ===
- Netawaka Township (north)
- Whiting Township (northeast)
- Straight Creek Township (east)
- Garfield Township (southeast)
- Franklin Township (south)
- Banner Township (southwest)
- Jefferson Township (west)
- Wetmore Township, Nemaha County (northwest)

=== Major highways ===
- U.S. Route 75
