= Soldier Township, Jackson County, Kansas =

Soldier Township
- Township
- Location in Jackson County
- Coordinates: 39°31′33″N 95°57′31″W
- Country: United States
- State: Kansas
- County: Jackson

Area
  - Total: 42.6 sq mi (110.4 km^{2})
  - Land: 42.55 sq mi (110.21 km^{2})
  - Water: 0.073 sq mi (0.19 km^{2}) 0.17%
- Elevation: 1,230 ft (375 m)

Population (2020)
  - Total: 344
  - Density: 8.08/sq mi (3.12/km^{2})
- GNIS feature ID: 0472569

Soldier Township is a township in Jackson County, Kansas, United States. As of the 2020 census, its population was 344.

== History ==
Soldier Township was formed in 1872.

== Geography ==
Soldier Township covers an area of 42.63 square miles (110.4 square kilometers); of this, 0.07 square miles (0.19 square kilometers) or 0.17 percent is water.

=== Communities ===
- Soldier

=== Adjacent townships ===
- Reilly Township, Nemaha County (north)
- Jefferson Township (east)
- Banner Township (southeast)
- Grant Township (south)
- Lincoln Township, Pottawatomie County (southwest)
- Grant Township, Pottawatomie County (west)
- Red Vermillion Township, Nemaha County (northwest)

=== Major highways ===
- K-63
