= Thomas Ambrose Butler =

19th-century Irish American Catholic priest and author

Reverend Father Thomas Ambrose Butler
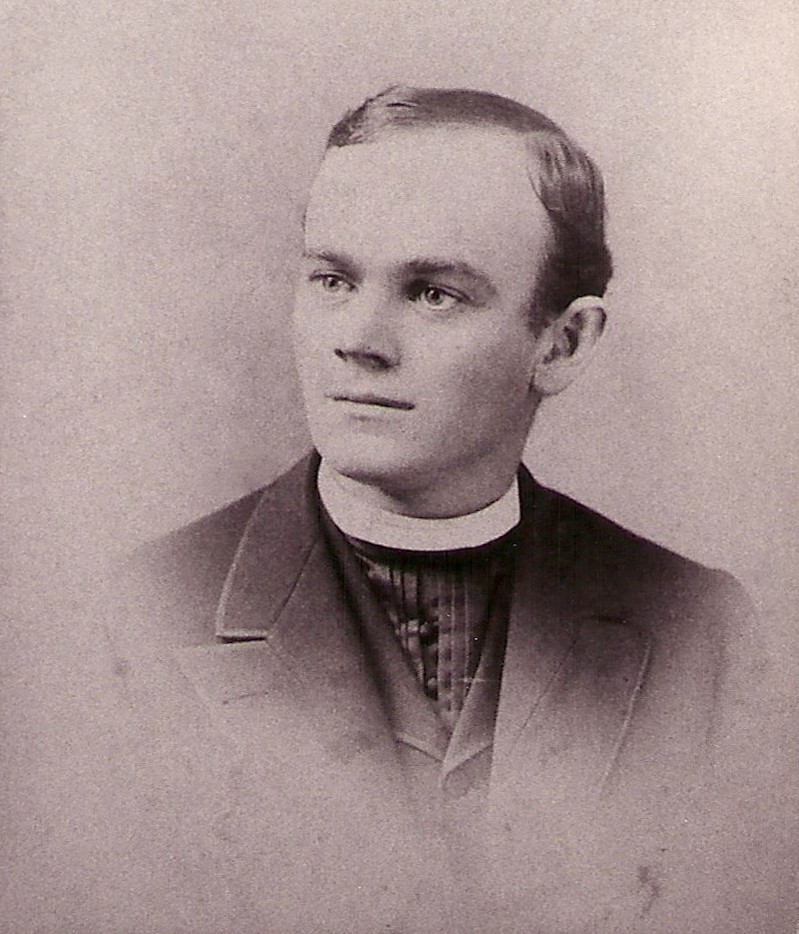
- Butler as a young priest
- Church: Roman Catholic Church
- Archdiocese: Dublin; St. Louis
- Diocese: Leavenworth

Orders
- Ordination: May 17, 1864 by Paul Cullen

Personal details
- Born: Thomas Ambrose Butler; March 21, 1837 Dublin, Ireland
- Died: September 6, 1897 (aged 60) St. Louis, Missouri, United States
- Buried: Calvary Cemetery; St. Louis, Missouri, U.S.
- Denomination: Roman Catholic
- Education: Catholic University of Ireland; Maynooth College

Thomas Ambrose Butler (March 21, 1837 – September 6, 1897) was an Irish American Catholic priest known for his writings on Irish immigration and his promotion of Irish settlements in the state of Kansas, which led to the founding of the Irish colony of Butler City, Kansas.

== Biography ==
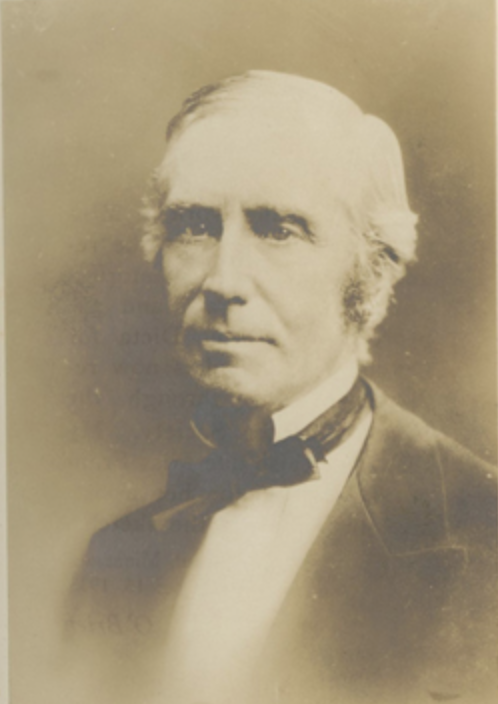
Dillon O'Brien, Butler's friend and father of Thomas D. O'Brien, gave Butler inspiration and advice in his colonization efforts

Thomas Butler was born on March 21, 1837, in Dublin Ireland to a middle-class family. Growing up, he attended St. Paul's Parish in Dublin. Butler received secondary education through Schools of the Christian Brothers. Upon hearing of John Henry Newman's new school, Catholic University of Ireland, young Butler was the first to sign his name upon the roster. On October 19, 1854, Butler left the University and enrolled in the humanities class at St. Patrick's College, known at the time as Maynooth College. For the first three years of his priesthood, Butler remained in Ireland where he was appointed to a curacy in Wicklow County at St. Nicholas Parish in Donard.

In 1867, Butler immigrated to America and was assigned to Leavenworth, Kansas. Bishop John Baptiste Miège made Butler associate pastor of the Cathedral of Immaculate Conception. While here, Butler started analyzing the life of an average Irish immigrant in America as well as promoting the state of Kansas as a safe-haven for the Irish to start farms and communities. Although stationed in Leavenworth, Butler spent much of his 8 years traveling the state of Kansas, offering Mass, dispensing sacraments, and assessing the progress of Irish immigrants. From 1872 until about 1874, Butler was placed in charge of the parish in Hoge, Kansas.

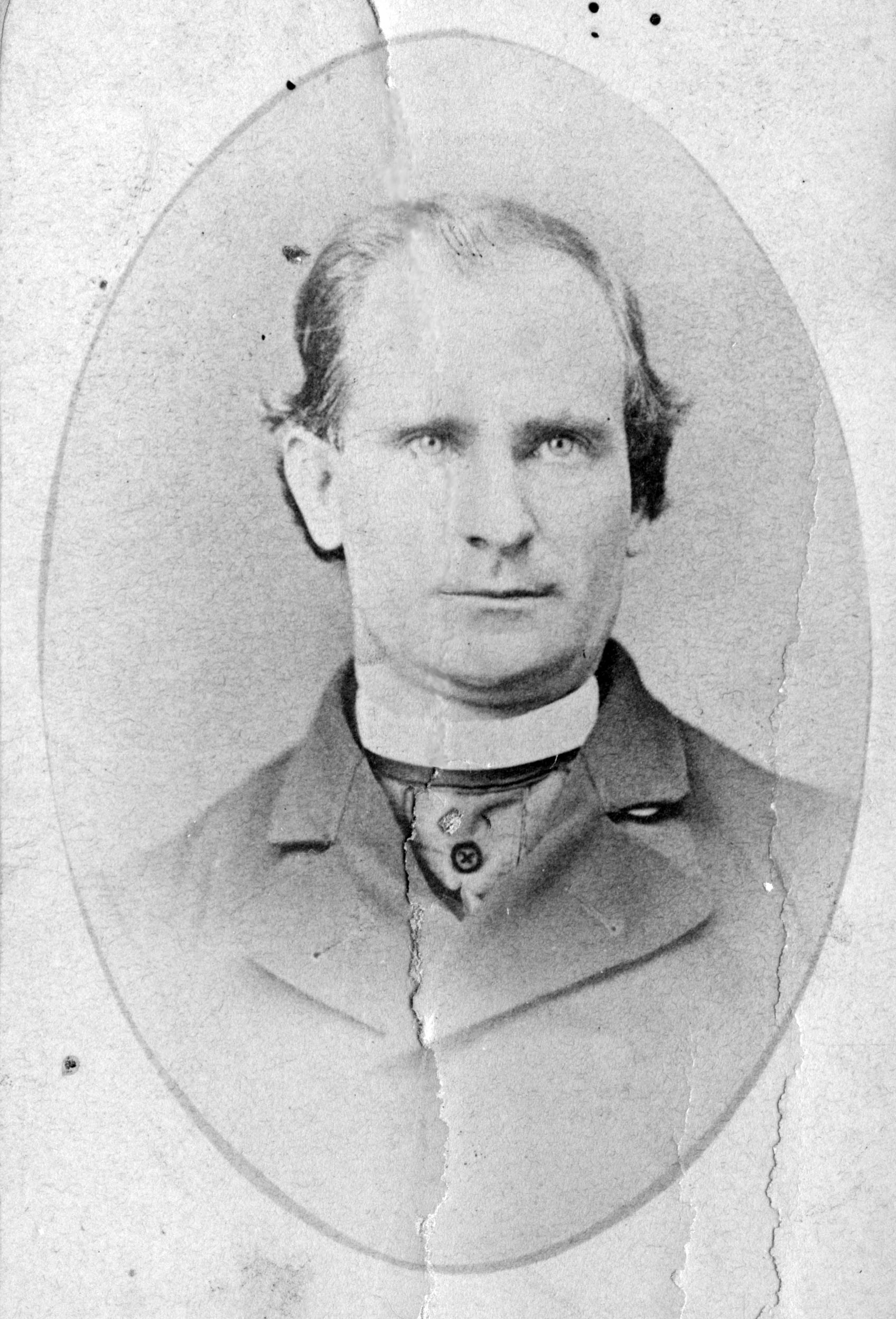
Butler later in life

After his time in Leavenworth, Butler was assigned pastor of St. James Parish in St. Louis. While there, he interacted with many immigrants living in deplorable conditions and not fully finding root in their new home. In 1877, remembering the fertile lands back in Kansas, Butler won the support of wealthy Irish men to fund efforts to create a colony in Northeast Kansas. Soon, they purchased 12,000 acres of land in Pottawatamie County, Kansas from Union Pacific. On February 1, 1887 Butler organized a final meeting of the Colonization Board; the next day, a group of men headed west on the train to start the community. Eventually 600 people moved to this land and established a central community, Butler City; the center of the community being St. Columbkille's Church.

At the same time Butler was organizing the Irish Colony, he founded St. Cronan parish in St. Louis.

In April 1890, Butler made a visit to the former Butler City (the name of the town had since been changed to Blaine). He was met with a grand celebration with nearly all the surrounding residents attending.

On September 6, 1897, while still pastor of St. Cronan's, Butler died. At Butler's Requiem Mass two days later, P. B. Cahill of Macon, Missouri gave a moving sermon:

...The historian of the diocese, when recounting the actions and deeds of the pioneer priests of St. Louis diocese, can't pass over lightly the latest urn closed in the priests' lot in Calvary Cemetery. And we bespeak a bright page in that history of Rev. Thomas Ambrose Butler, the Soggarth Aroon of St. Cronan's, the well beloved of his fellow priests, the poet priest of Missouri, if not of the West, the gentleman, the scholar, the saint, the dearest friend ever we knew or expect to know on this earth. May his soul rest in peace, Amen!

— Cahill

== Writings ==
Butler became well known for his writings and poetry, a trait that earned him the nickname "The Poet Priest of the West". He published two major works in his life, both concerning themselves with Irish immigration.

=== The State of Kansas and Irish Immigration ===
In 1871, Butler published The State of Kansas and Irish Immigration. In this pamphlet, Butler describes his experience in Kansas as a pastor at the Catholic cathedral in Leavenworth. Butler provides advice to people in Ireland who are thinking of immigrating to the United States.

I am not an advocate of Irish emigration; I would rather a million of times that "the old race" could hold every inch of "the old land." I believe that the pang of separation, and the subsequent sad feeling of exile from friends and country, leave an impress upon the heart that can never be removed. Let those, then, who can live at home in Ireland remain there--unless, indeed, the future prospects of their family are very dark

— Butler, The State of Kansas and Irish Immigration

=== The Irish on the Prairies: and Other Poems ===
While still at the Cathedral Of Leavenworth, Butler also published a book of his own poems and songs titled The Irish on the Prairies: and Other Poems. The works included were about the "Old Land", Immigration, and life on the prairies of Kansas.
