= Vienna Township, Kansas =

Township in Pottawatomie County, Kansas, U.S.

Vienna Township
- Township
- Location within Pottawatomie County
- Coordinates: 39.426911°N 96.173921°W
- Country: United States
- State: Kansas
- County: Pottawatomie
- Established: 1882

Government
  - County Commissioner District 5: Terry Force

Area
  - Total: 30.23 sq mi (78.3 km^{2})
  - Land: 30.164 sq mi (78.12 km^{2})
  - Water: 0.066 sq mi (0.17 km^{2}) 0.22%

Population (2020)
  - Total: 80
  - Density: 2.7/sq mi (1.0/km^{2})
- Time zone: UTC-6 (CST)
  - Summer (DST): UTC-5 (CDT)
- Area code: 785
- GNIS feature ID: 476121

Vienna Township is a township in Pottawatomie County, Kansas, United States. As of the 2020 census, its population was 80.

== History ==
Vienna Township was established in 1882.

== Geography ==
Vienna Township covers an area of 30.23 square miles (78.3 square kilometers).

=== Adjacent townships ===
Mill Creek Township, Pottawatomie County
		north
Sherman Township, Pottawatomie County	west	self	east	Lincoln Township, Pottawatomie County
Center Township, Pottawatomie County	southwest		southeast	St. Clere Township, Pottawatomie County
