= Pottawatomie Township, Pottawatomie County, Kansas =

Township in Pottawatomie County, Kansas, U.S.

Pottawatomie Township
- Township
- Location within Pottawatomie County
- Coordinates: 39.335115°N 96.454367°W
- Country: United States
- State: Kansas
- County: Pottawatomie
- Established: 1882

Government
  - County Commissioner District 5: Terry Force

Area
  - Total: 59.909 sq mi (155.16 km^{2})
  - Land: 59.701 sq mi (154.62 km^{2})
  - Water: 0.208 sq mi (0.54 km^{2}) 0.35%

Population (2020)
  - Total: 688
  - Density: 11.5/sq mi (4.45/km^{2})
- Time zone: UTC-6 (CST)
  - Summer (DST): UTC-5 (CDT)
- Area code: 785
- GNIS feature ID: 476085

Pottawatomie Township is a township in Pottawatomie County, Kansas, United States. As of the 2020 census, its population was 688.

== History ==
Pottawatomie Township was established in 1882.

== Geography ==
Pottawatomie Township covers an area of 59.909 square miles (155.16 square kilometers).

=== Communities ===
- part of Westmoreland
- Flush

=== Adjacent townships ===
Shannon Township, Pottawatomie County	northwest		northeast	Rock Creek Township, Pottawatomie County
Green Township, Pottawatomie County	west	self	east	Union Township, Pottawatomie County
Blue Township, Pottawatomie County	southwest	south	southeast	Louisville Township, Pottawatomie County
St. George Township, Pottawatomie County

== Transportation ==
=== Major highways ===
- K-13
- K-99
