= Union Township, Pottawatomie County, Kansas =

Township in Pottawatomie County, Kansas, U.S.

Union Township
- Township
- Location within Pottawatomie County
- Coordinates: 39.342151°N 96.327012°W
- Country: United States
- State: Kansas
- County: Pottawatomie
- Established: 1882

Government
  - County Commissioner District 5: Terry Force

Area
  - Total: 36.117 sq mi (93.54 km^{2})
  - Land: 35.997 sq mi (93.23 km^{2})
  - Water: 0.12 sq mi (0.31 km^{2}) 0.33%

Population (2020)
  - Total: 239
  - Density: 6.64/sq mi (2.56/km^{2})
- Time zone: UTC-6 (CST)
  - Summer (DST): UTC-5 (CDT)
- Area code: 785
- GNIS feature ID: 476095

Union Township is a township in Pottawatomie County, Kansas, United States. As of the 2020 census, its population was 239.

== History ==
Union Township was established in 1882.

== Geography ==
Union Township covers an area of 36.117 square miles (93.54 square kilometers).

=== Adjacent townships ===
Sherman Township, Pottawatomie County
| Rock Creek Township, Pottawatomie County | northwest | north |
| Pottawatomie Township, Pottawatomie County | west | self | east | Center Township, Pottawatomie County |
| | | south |
Louisville Township, Pottawatomie County

== Transportation ==
=== Major highways ===
- K-99
