= Vermillion Township, Kansas =

Township in Marshall County, Kansas, U.S.

Vermillion Township
- Township
- Interactive map of Vermillion Township
- Coordinates: 39.696661°N 96.405486°W
- Country: United States
- State: Kansas
- County: Marshall

Area
  - Total: 35.951 sq mi (93.11 km^{2})
  - Land: 35.791 sq mi (92.70 km^{2})
  - Water: 0.16 sq mi (0.41 km^{2}) 0.45%

Population (2020)
  - Total: 904
  - Density: 25.3/sq mi (9.75/km^{2})
- Time zone: UTC-6 (CST)
  - Summer (DST): UTC-5 (CDT)
- Area code: 785

Vermillion Township is a township in Marshall County, Kansas, United States. As of the 2020 census, its population was 904.

== Geography ==
Vermillion Township covers an area of 35.951 square miles (93.11 square kilometers).

=== Communities ===
- Frankfort

=== Adjacent townships ===
- Rock Township, Marshall County (north)
- Lincoln Township, Marshall County (northeast)
- Noble Township, Marshall County (east)
- Cleveland Township, Marshall County (southeast)
- Clear Fork Township, Marshall County (south)
- Bigelow Township, Marshall County (southwest)
- Wells Township, Marshall County (west)
- Center Township, Marshall County (northwest)

=== Major highways ===
- K-9
- K-99
