= Home Township, Kansas =

Township in Nemaha County, Kansas, U.S.

Home Township
- Township
- Location within Nemaha County
- Coordinates: 39.705863°N 96.184059°W
- Country: United States
- State: Kansas
- County: Nemaha

Area
  - Total: 36.247 sq mi (93.88 km^{2})
  - Land: 35.605 sq mi (92.22 km^{2})
  - Water: 0.642 sq mi (1.66 km^{2}) 1.77%

Population (2020)
  - Total: 511
  - Density: 14.4/sq mi (5.54/km^{2})
- Time zone: UTC-6 (CST)
  - Summer (DST): UTC-5 (CDT)
- Area code: 785

Home Township is a township in Nemaha County, Kansas, United States. As of the 2020 census, its population was 511.

== Geography ==
Home Township covers an area of 36.247 square miles (93.88 square kilometers).

=== Communities ===
- Centralia

=== Adjacent townships ===
- Center Township, Nemaha County (north)
- Mitchell Township, Nemaha County (northeast)
- Illinois Township, Nemaha County (east)
- Red Vermillion Township, Nemaha County (southeast)
- Neuchatel Township, Nemaha County (south)
- Cleveland Township, Marshall County (southwest)
- Noble Township, Marshall County (west)
- Lincoln Township, Marshall County (northwest)

=== Major highways ===
- K-9
