= Louisville Township, Kansas =

Township in Pottawatomie County, Kansas, U.S.

Louisville Township
- Township
- Location within Pottawatomie County
- Coordinates: 39.271582°N 96.310221°W
- Country: United States
- State: Kansas
- County: Pottawatomie
- Established: 1882

Government
  - County Commissioner District 3: Bill Drew

Area
  - Total: 36.682 sq mi (95.01 km^{2})
  - Land: 36.469 sq mi (94.45 km^{2})
  - Water: 0.213 sq mi (0.55 km^{2}) 0.58%

Population (2020)
  - Total: 1,005
  - Density: 27.56/sq mi (10.64/km^{2})
- Time zone: UTC-6 (CST)
  - Summer (DST): UTC-5 (CDT)
- Area code: 785
- GNIS feature ID: 476233

Louisville Township is a township in Pottawatomie County, Kansas, United States. As of the 2020 census, its population was 1,015.

== History ==
Louisville Township was established in 1882.

== Geography ==
Louisville Township covers an area of 36.682 square miles (95.01 square kilometers).

=== Communities ===
- Louisville

=== Adjacent townships ===
Union Township, Pottawatomie County
Pottawatomie Township, Pottawatomie County	northwest	north	northeast	Center Township, Pottawatomie County
		self	east	Belvue Township, Pottawatomie County
St. George Township, Pottawatomie County	southwest	south
Wamego Township, Pottawatomie County

== Transportation ==
=== Major highways ===
- K-99
