= St. Clere Township, Kansas =

Township in Pottawatomie County, Kansas, U.S.

St. Clere Township
- Township
- Location within Pottawatomie County
- Coordinates: 39.360957°N 96.099674°W
- Country: United States
- State: Kansas
- County: Pottawatomie
- Established: 1882

Government
  - County Commissioner District 5: Terry Force

Area
  - Total: 29.977 sq mi (77.64 km^{2})
  - Land: 29.846 sq mi (77.30 km^{2})
  - Water: 0.131 sq mi (0.34 km^{2}) 0.44%

Population (2020)
  - Total: 49
  - Density: 1.6/sq mi (0.63/km^{2})
- Time zone: UTC-6 (CST)
  - Summer (DST): UTC-5 (CDT)
- Area code: 785
- GNIS feature ID: 476122

St. Clere Township is a township in Pottawatomie County, Kansas, United States. As of the 2020 census, its population was 49.

== History ==
St. Clere Township was established in 1882.

== Geography ==
St. Clere Township covers an area of 29.977 square miles (77.64 square kilometers).

=== Communities ===
- Saint Clere

=== Adjacent townships ===
Lincoln Township, Pottawatomie County
Vienna Township, Pottawatomie County	northwest	north	northeast	Grant Township, Jackson County
Center Township, Pottawatomie County	west	self	east	Adrian Township, Jackson County
		south
Emmett Township, Pottawatomie County

== Transportation ==
=== Major highways ===
- K-63
