= Emmett Township, Kansas =

Township in Pottawatomie County, Kansas, U.S.

Emmett Township
- Township
- Location within Pottawatomie County
- Coordinates: 39.309034°N 96.085595°W
- Country: United States
- State: Kansas
- County: Pottawatomie
- Established: 1882

Government
  - County Commissioner District 5: Terry Force

Area
  - Total: 29.969 sq mi (77.62 km^{2})
  - Land: 29.707 sq mi (76.94 km^{2})
  - Water: 0.262 sq mi (0.68 km^{2}) 0.87%

Population (2020)
  - Total: 450
  - Density: 15/sq mi (5.8/km^{2})
- Time zone: UTC-6 (CST)
  - Summer (DST): UTC-5 (CDT)
- Area code: 785
- GNIS feature ID: 476250

Emmett Township is a township in Pottawatomie County, Kansas, United States. As of the 2020 census, its population was 450.

== History ==
Emmett Township was established in 1882. A now-extinct town called Holycross was located in the township. Its post office was in operation from 1884 to 1910.

== Geography ==
Emmett Township covers an area of 29.969 square miles (77.62 square kilometers).

=== Communities ===
- Emmett

=== Adjacent townships ===
St. Clere Township, Pottawatomie County
| | | north | northeast | Adrian Township, Jackson County |
| Center Township, Pottawatomie County | west | self |
| Belvue Township, Pottawatomie County | southwest | south | southeast | Washington Township, Jackson County |
St. Marys Township, Pottawatomie County

== Transportation ==
=== Major highways ===
- K-63
