= Red Vermillion Township, Kansas =

Township in Nemaha County, Kansas

Red Vermillion Township
- Township
- Location within Nemaha County
- Coordinates: 39.61°N 96.09°W
- Country: United States
- State: Kansas
- County: Nemaha

Area
  - Total: 35.977 sq mi (93.18 km^{2})
  - Land: 35.863 sq mi (92.88 km^{2})
  - Water: 0.114 sq mi (0.30 km^{2}) 0.32%

Population (2020)
  - Total: 123
  - Density: 3.43/sq mi (1.32/km^{2})
- Time zone: UTC-6 (CST)
  - Summer (DST): UTC-5 (CDT)
- Area code: 785

Red Vermillion is a township in Nemaha County, Kansas, United States.

== History ==
The origin of name Red Vermillion is unclear, and 'red vermillion' is somewhat redundant, as vermilion is a shade of red.

== Geography ==
Red Vermillion Township covers an area of 35.977 square miles (93.18 square kilometers).

=== Adjacent townships ===
- Illinois Township, Nemaha County (north)
- Harrison Township, Nemaha County (northeast)
- Reilly Township, Nemaha County (east)
- Soldier Township, Jackson County (southeast)
- Grant Township, Pottawatomie County (south)
- Mill Creek Township, Pottawatomie County (southwest)
- Neuchatel Township, Nemaha County (west)
- Home Township, Nemaha County (northwest)

=== Major highways ===
- K-9
- K-63
