= Straight Creek Township, Kansas =

Straight Creek Township
- Township
- Location in Jackson County
- Coordinates: 39°31′35″N 95°38′51″W
- Country: United States
- State: Kansas
- County: Jackson

Area
  - Total: 36.72 sq mi (95.11 km^{2})
  - Land: 36.61 sq mi (94.83 km^{2})
  - Water: 0.11 sq mi (0.28 km^{2}) 0.29%
- Elevation: 1,027 ft (313 m)

Population (2020)
  - Total: 202
  - Density: 5.52/sq mi (2.13/km^{2})
- GNIS feature ID: 0473455

Straight Creek Township is a township in Jackson County, Kansas, United States. As of the 2020 census, its population was 202.

== History ==
The territory of Straight Creek Township belonged to the Kickapoo Tribe in Kansas prior to 1869.

== Geography ==
Straight Creek Township covers an area of 36.72 square miles (95.11 square kilometers); of this, 0.11 square miles (0.28 square kilometers) or 0.29 percent is water.

=== Adjacent townships ===
- Whiting Township (north)
- Grasshopper Township, Atchison County (northeast)
- Kapioma Township, Atchison County (east)
- Garfield Township (south)
- Franklin Township (southwest)
- Liberty Township (west)
- Netawaka Township (northwest)

=== Cemeteries ===
The township contains two cemeteries: Estes and Larkinburg.
