= Cassius & Adelia Baker House =

Historic house in Kansas, United States

- U.S. National Register of Historic Places
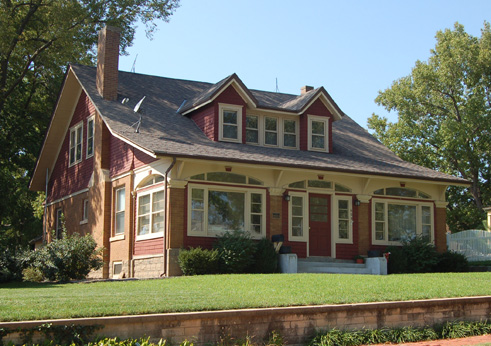
- The Cassius & Adelia Baker House in 2014

- Location within Kansas
- Location: 609 Elm Street, Wamego, Kansas, U.S.
- Coordinates: 39°12′15″N 96°18′24″W
- Built: 1910
- Architectural style: Bungalow, Craftsman
- NRHP reference No.: 13000433
- Added to NRHP: June 25, 2013

Cassius & Adelia Baker House is a historic house in Wamego, Kansas, U.S.. It was built in 1910. It was designed in the American Craftsman architectural style. It has been listed on the National Register of Historic Places since June 25, 2013.
