= Havensville, Kansas =

City in Pottawatomie County, Kansas, United States

- City
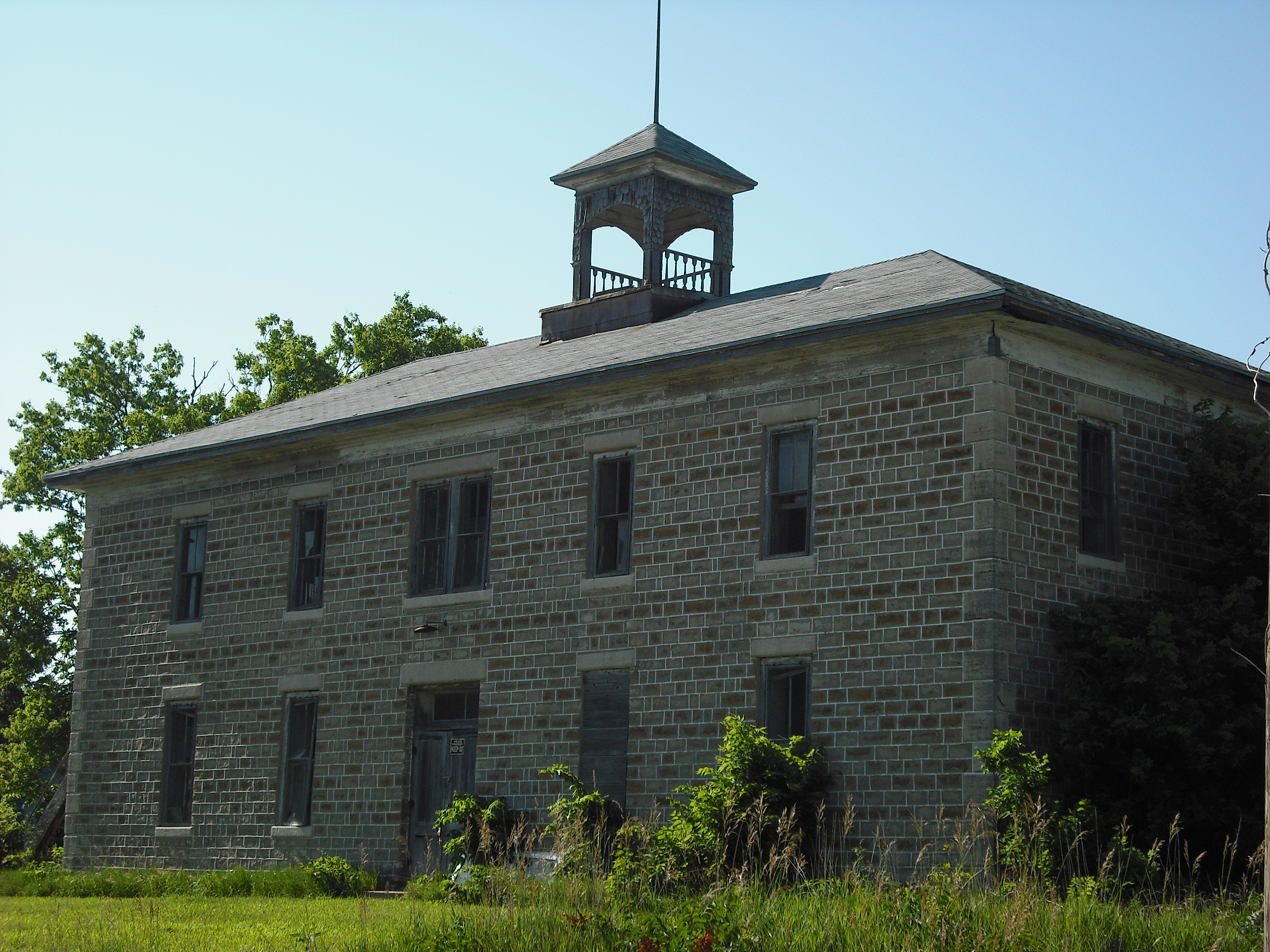
- Historic Havensville School (2009)

- Location within Pottawatomie County and Kansas

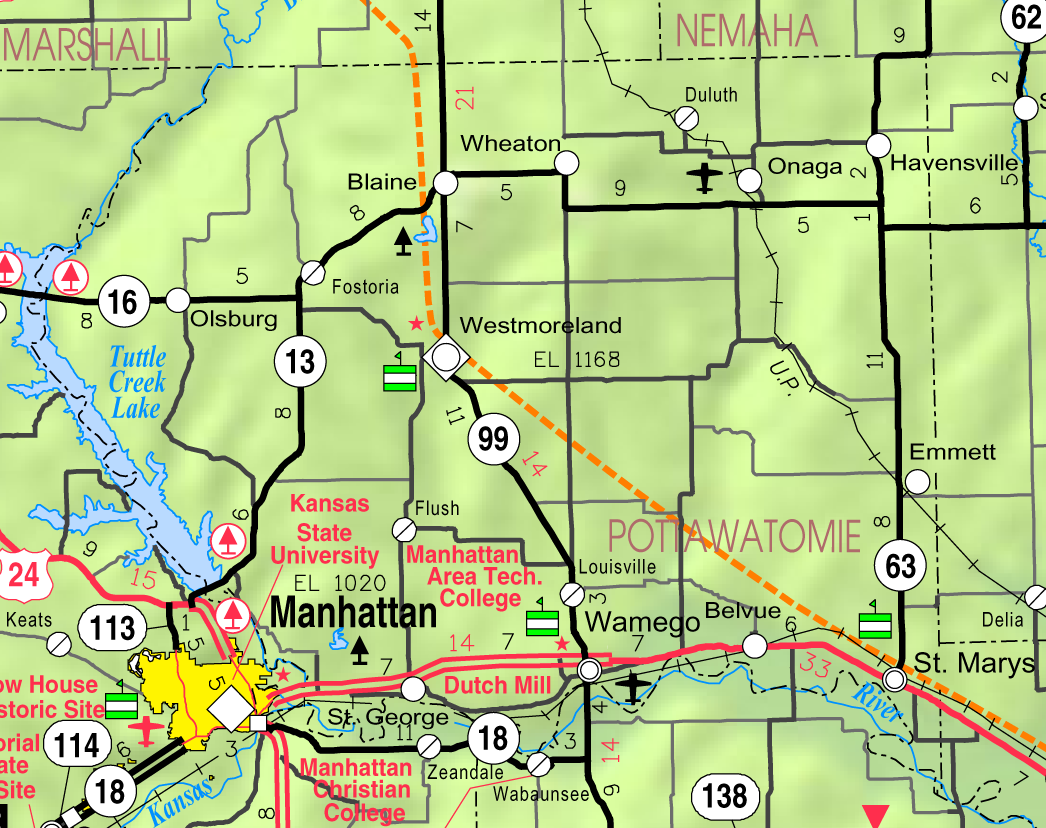
- KDOT map of Pottawatomie County (legend)
- Coordinates: 39°30′40″N 96°04′35″W
- Country: United States
- State: Kansas
- County: Pottawatomie
- Founded: 1878
- Incorporated: 1892
- Named for: Paul Havens

Area
  - Total: 0.15 sq mi (0.38 km^{2})
  - Land: 0.15 sq mi (0.38 km^{2})
  - Water: 0 sq mi (0.00 km^{2})
- Elevation: 1,204 ft (367 m)

Population (2020)
  - Total: 119
  - Density: 810/sq mi (310/km^{2})
- Time zone: UTC-6 (CST)
  - Summer (DST): UTC-5 (CDT)
- ZIP Code: 66432
- Area code: 785
- FIPS code: 20-30775
- GNIS ID: 2394327

Havensville is a city in Pottawatomie County, Kansas, United States. As of the 2020 census, the population of the city was 119.

== History ==
Havensville had its start in the year 1878 by the building of the railroad through that territory. It was named for Paul E. Havens, a railroad employee.

The first post office in Havensville was established in March 1878.

== Geography ==
According to the United States Census Bureau, the city has a total area of 0.15 square miles (0.39 km^{2}), all land.

=== Climate ===
This climatic region is typified by large seasonal temperature differences, with warm to hot (and often humid) summers and cold (sometimes severely cold) winters. According to the Köppen Climate Classification system, Havensville has a humid continental climate, abbreviated "Dfa" on climate maps.

== Demographics ==
Historical population
Census	Pop.	Note	%±
1880	180		—
1900	437		—
1910	412		−5.7%
1920	333		−19.2%
1930	263		−21.0%
1940	232		−11.8%
1950	208		−10.3%
1960	166		−20.2%
1970	163		−1.8%
1980	183		12.3%
1990	135		−26.2%
2000	146		8.1%
2010	133		−8.9%
2020	119		−10.5%
U.S. Decennial Census

Havensville is part of the Manhattan, Kansas Metropolitan Statistical Area.

=== 2020 census ===
The 2020 United States census counted 119 people, 51 households, and 34 families in Havensville. The population density was 820.7 per square mile (316.9/km^{2}). There were 59 housing units at an average density of 406.9 per square mile (157.1/km^{2}). The racial makeup was 93.28% (111) white or European American (89.92% non-Hispanic white), 0.0% (0) black or African-American, 1.68% (2) Native American or Alaska Native, 0.84% (1) Asian, 0.0% (0) Pacific Islander or Native Hawaiian, 1.68% (2) from other races, and 2.52% (3) from two or more races. Hispanic or Latino of any race was 3.36% (4) of the population.

Of the 51 households, 19.6% had children under the age of 18; 49.0% were married couples living together; 25.5% had a female householder with no spouse or partner present. 27.5% of households consisted of individuals and 5.9% had someone living alone who was 65 years of age or older. The average household size was 3.3 and the average family size was 3.5. The percent of those with a bachelor's degree or higher was estimated to be 19.3% of the population.

18.5% of the population was under the age of 18, 6.7% from 18 to 24, 21.8% from 25 to 44, 31.9% from 45 to 64, and 21.0% who were 65 years of age or older. The median age was 47.3 years. For every 100 females, there were 85.9 males. For every 100 females ages 18 and older, there were 90.2 males.

The 2016–2020 5-year American Community Survey estimates show that the median household income was $101,250 (with a margin of error of +/- $53,413) and the median family income was $104,375 (+/- $45,295). Males had a median income of $71,667 (+/- $58,927) versus $17,031 (+/- $8,488) for females. Approximately, 8.6% of families and 15.0% of the population were below the poverty line, including 53.8% of those under the age of 18 and 4.8% of those ages 65 or over.

=== 2010 census ===
As of the census of 2010, there were 133 people, 58 households, and 41 families residing in the city. The population density was 886.7 inhabitants per square mile (342.4/km^{2}). There were 73 housing units at an average density of 486.7 per square mile (187.9/km^{2}). The racial makeup of the city was 98.5% White, 0.8% from other races, and 0.8% from two or more races. Hispanic or Latino of any race were 3.8% of the population.

There were 58 households, of which 22.4% had children under the age of 18 living with them, 58.6% were married couples living together, 8.6% had a female householder with no husband present, 3.4% had a male householder with no wife present, and 29.3% were non-families. 25.9% of all households were made up of individuals, and 6.9% had someone living alone who was 65 years of age or older. The average household size was 2.29 and the average family size was 2.73.

The median age in the city was 45.8 years. 20.3% of residents were under the age of 18; 3.9% were between the ages of 18 and 24; 24.8% were from 25 to 44; 38.3% were from 45 to 64; and 12.8% were 65 years of age or older. The gender makeup of the city was 55.6% male and 44.4% female.

=== 2000 census ===
As of the census of 2000, there were 146 people, 64 households, and 41 families residing in the city. The population density was 1,116.0 inhabitants per square mile (430.9/km^{2}). There were 74 housing units at an average density of 565.6 per square mile (218.4/km^{2}). The racial makeup of the city was 95.21% White, 0.68% African American, 0.68% Native American, 0.68% from other races, and 2.74% from two or more races. Hispanic or Latino of any race were 2.74% of the population.

There were 64 households, out of which 29.7% had children under the age of 18 living with them, 60.9% were married couples living together, 4.7% had a female householder with no husband present, and 34.4% were non-families. 32.8% of all households were made up of individuals, and 12.5% had someone living alone who was 65 years of age or older. The average household size was 2.28 and the average family size was 2.90.

In the city, the population was spread out, with 24.7% under the age of 18, 6.2% from 18 to 24, 31.5% from 25 to 44, 20.5% from 45 to 64, and 17.1% who were 65 years of age or older. The median age was 39 years. For every 100 females, there were 117.9 males. For every 100 females age 18 and over, there were 100.0 males.

The median income for a household in the city was $26,875, and the median income for a family was $43,125. Males had a median income of $31,250 versus $17,000 for females. The per capita income for the city was $18,043. There were 7.9% of families and 10.9% of the population living below the poverty line, including 22.6% of under eighteens and 6.9% of those over 64.

== Education ==
The community is served by Onaga USD 322 public school district.
