= Neuchatel, Kansas =

Unincorporated community in Nemaha County, Kansas

Coordinates: 39°34′05″N 96°12′07″W

Neuchatel is an unincorporated community in Nemaha County, Kansas, United States. It encompasses a region of farmland with no settlements clustered around the intersection of Old Pike's Peak Trail Road and C Road.

== History ==
Neuchatel was founded in 1870 by French and Swiss immigrants.

An 1887 map shows a since-removed U.S. Post Office, Presbyterian church and schoolhouse

== Education ==
The community and nearby rural areas are served by Onaga USD 322 public school district.
