= Onaga USD 322 =

Public school district in Onaga, Kansas

Address
- 500 High St. Onaga, Kansas, 66521; United States
- Coordinates: 39.49212°N 96.16559°W

District information
- Type: Public
- Grades: PreK to 12
- Schools: 1

Other information
- Website: usd322.org

Onaga USD 322, also known as Onaga-Havensville-Wheaton USD 322, is a public unified school district headquartered in Onaga, Kansas, United States. The district includes the communities of Onaga, Havensville, Wheaton, Duluth, Saint Clere, Neuchatel, and nearby rural areas.

== Schools ==
The school district operates the following schools in a conglomerate of connected buildings:

- Onaga Senior High School
- Onaga Junior High School
- Onaga Grade School

== See also ==
- Kansas State Department of Education
- Kansas State High School Activities Association
- List of high schools in Kansas
- List of unified school districts in Kansas
