= Jefferson Township, Jackson County, Kansas =

Jefferson Township
- Township
- Location in Jackson County
- Coordinates: 39°31′35″N 95°50′29″W
- Country: United States
- State: Kansas
- County: Jackson

Area
  - Total: 36.39 sq mi (94.26 km^{2})
  - Land: 36.35 sq mi (94.15 km^{2})
  - Water: 0.042 sq mi (0.11 km^{2}) 0.12%
- Elevation: 1,234 ft (376 m)

Population (2020)
  - Total: 528
  - Density: 14.5/sq mi (5.61/km^{2})
- GNIS feature ID: 0473450

Jefferson Township is a township in Jackson County, Kansas, United States. As of the 2020 census, its population was 528.

== History ==
Jefferson Township was formed in 1858.

== Geography ==
Jefferson Township covers an area of 36.39 square miles (94.26 square kilometers); of this, 0.04 square miles (0.11 square kilometers) or 0.12 percent is water.

=== Communities ===
- Circleville

=== Adjacent townships ===
- Wetmore Township, Nemaha County (north)
- Liberty Township (east)
- Franklin Township (southeast)
- Banner Township (south)
- Grant Township (southwest)
- Soldier Township (west)
- Reilly Township, Nemaha County (northwest)

=== Cemeteries ===
The township contains one cemetery, Circleville.
