= Vermillion USD 380 =

Public school district in Vermillion, Kansas

Address
- 209 School St. Vermillion, Kansas, 66544; United States

District information
- Type: Public
- Grades: Pre-K to 12
- Schools: 3

Other information
- Website: usd380.com

Vermillion USD 380 is a public unified school district headquartered in Vermillion, Kansas, United States. The district includes the communities of Centralia, Corning, Frankfort, Vermillion, Lillis, Vliets, and nearby rural areas.

== Schools ==
The school district operates the following schools:

- Centralia Schools
- Frankfort Schools
- Vermillion Pre-K

== See also ==
- List of high schools in Kansas
- List of unified school districts in Kansas
- Kansas State Department of Education
- Kansas State High School Activities Association
