= Lillis, Kansas =

Unincorporated community in Marshall County, Kansas

- Unincorporated community
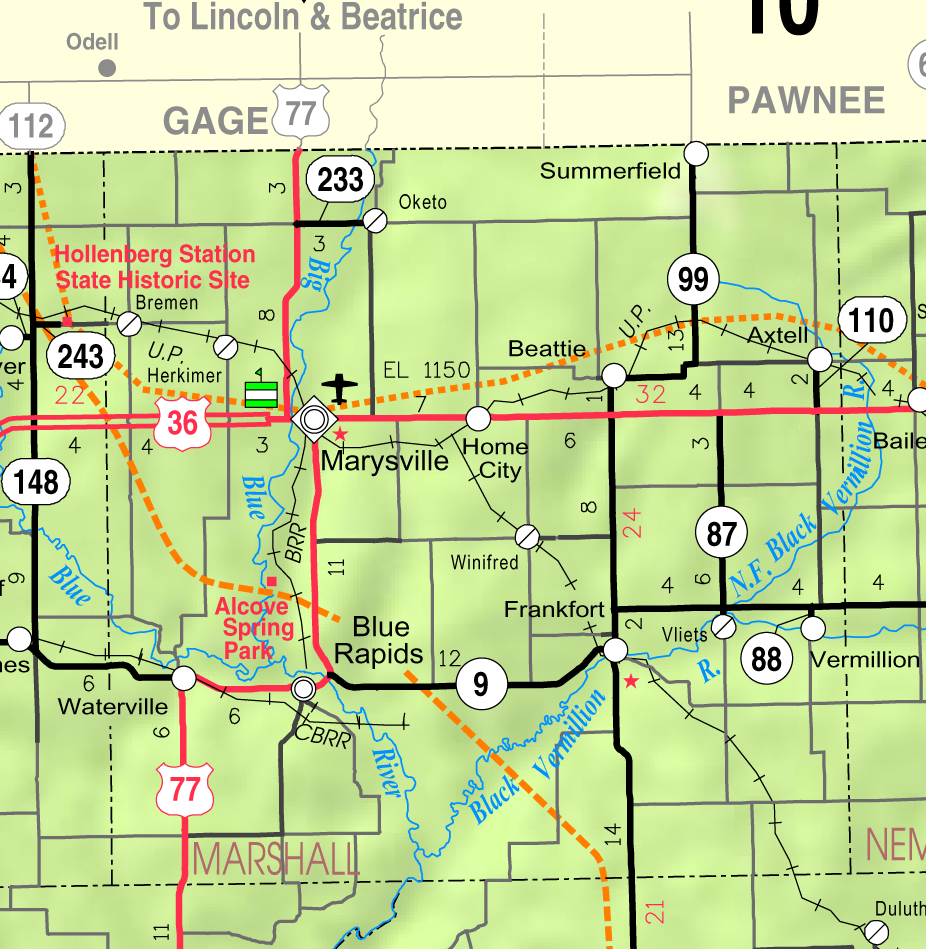
- KDOT map of Marshall County (legend)

- Location within Kansas Location within the United States
- Coordinates: 39°36′35″N 96°17′46″W
- Country: United States
- State: Kansas
- County: Marshall
- Named for: T. F. Lillis
- Elevation: 1,247 ft (380 m)
- Time zone: UTC-6 (CST)
  - Summer (DST): UTC-5 (CDT)
- Area code: 785
- FIPS code: 20-40425
- GNIS ID: 473425

Lillis is an unincorporated community in Marshall County, Kansas, United States.

== History ==
Lillis was named for Rev. T. F. Lillis. A post office was opened in Lillis in 1910, and remained in operation until it was discontinued in 1958.

The Lillis Gymnasium is on the National Register of Historic Places.

== Education ==
The community and nearby rural areas are served by Vermillion USD 380 public school district.
