= Lincoln Township, Pottawatomie County, Kansas =

Township in Pottawatomie County, Kansas, U.S.

Lincoln Township
- Township
- Location within Pottawatomie County
- Coordinates: 39.427663°N 96.081611°W
- Country: United States
- State: Kansas
- County: Pottawatomie
- Established: 1882

Government
  - County Commissioner District 5: Terry Force

Area
  - Total: 29.945 sq mi (77.56 km^{2})
  - Land: 29.755 sq mi (77.07 km^{2})
  - Water: 0.19 sq mi (0.49 km^{2}) 0.63%

Population (2020)
  - Total: 95
  - Density: 3.2/sq mi (1.2/km^{2})
- Time zone: UTC-6 (CST)
  - Summer (DST): UTC-5 (CDT)
- Area code: 785
- GNIS feature ID: 476120

Lincoln Township is a township in Pottawatomie County, Kansas, United States. As of the 2020 census, its population was 95.

== History ==
Lincoln Township was established in 1882.

== Geography ==
Lincoln Township covers an area of 29.945 square miles (77.56 square kilometers).

=== Adjacent townships ===
Grant Township, Pottawatomie County
Mill Creek Township, Pottawatomie County	northwest	north	northeast	Soldier Township, Jackson County
Vienna Township, Pottawatomie County	west	self	east	Grant Township, Jackson County
		south	southeast	Adrian Township, Jackson County
St. Clere Township, Pottawatomie County

== Transportation ==
=== Major highways ===
- K-16
- K-63
