= Duluth, Kansas =

Unincorporated community in Pottawatomie County, Kansas

Coordinates: 39°31′29″N 96°13′23″W

Duluth is an unincorporated community in Pottawatomie County, Kansas, United States.

== History ==
A post office was opened in Duluth in 1912, and remained in operation until it was discontinued in 1986.

== Education ==
The community and nearby rural areas are served by Onaga USD 322 public school district.
