= Vermillion, Kansas =

City in Marshall County, Kansas

- City
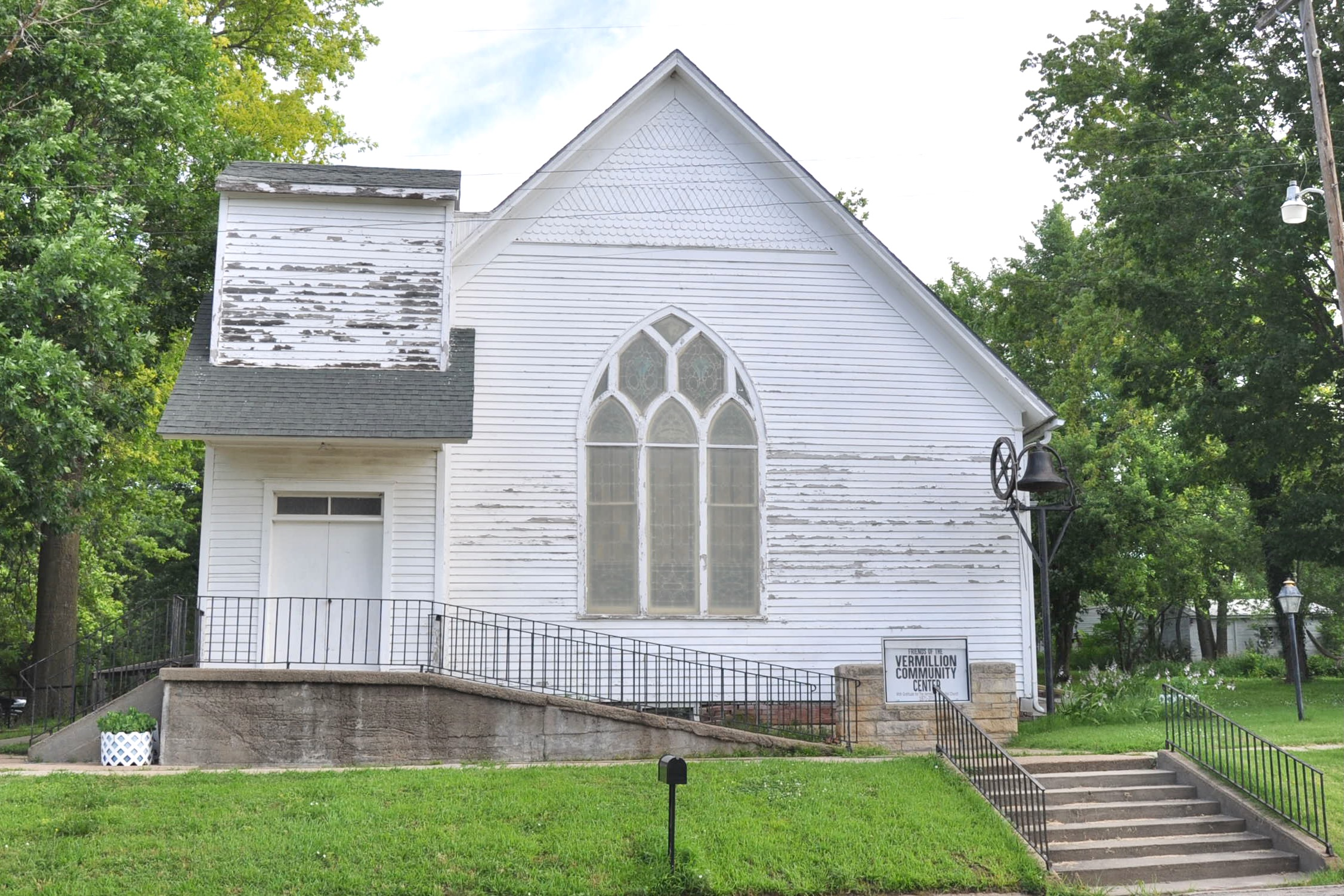
- Vermillion Community Center, formerly a United Methodist Church

- Location within Marshall County and Kansas

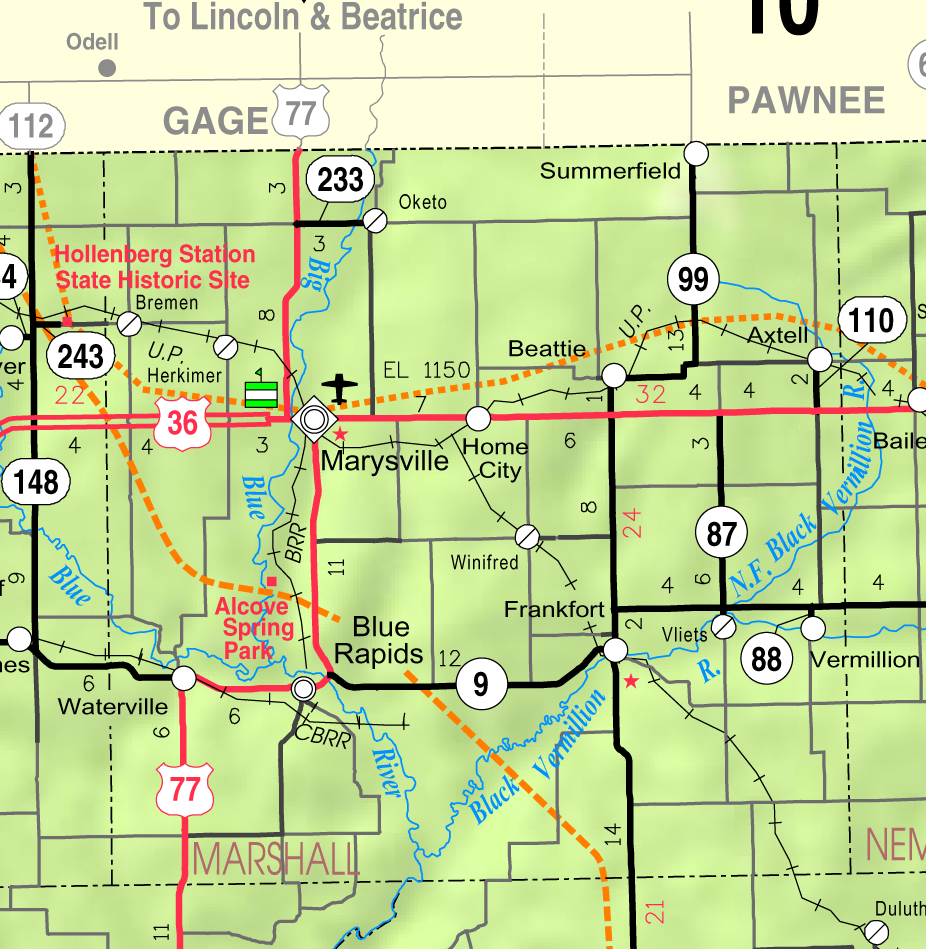
- KDOT map of Marshall County (legend)
- Coordinates: 39°43′06″N 96°15′56″W
- Country: United States
- State: Kansas
- County: Marshall
- Founded: 1869
- Incorporated: 1899
- Named for: Black Vermillion River

Area
  - Total: 0.22 sq mi (0.56 km^{2})
  - Land: 0.21 sq mi (0.54 km^{2})
  - Water: 0.0077 sq mi (0.02 km^{2})
- Elevation: 1,214 ft (370 m)

Population (2020)
  - Total: 76
  - Density: 360/sq mi (140/km^{2})
- Time zone: UTC-6 (CST)
  - Summer (DST): UTC-5 (CDT)
- ZIP Code: 66544
- Area code: 785
- FIPS code: 20-73525
- GNIS ID: 2397128

Vermillion is a city in Marshall County, Kansas, United States. As of the 2020 census, the population of the city was 76.

== History ==
Vermillion was founded in 1869 by the Missouri Pacific Railroad. It was named from the Black Vermillion River.

The first post office in Vermillion was established in May 1870.

== Geography ==
According to the United States Census Bureau, the city has a total area of 0.25 square miles (0.65 km^{2}), of which 0.24 square miles (0.62 km^{2}) is land and 0.01 square miles (0.03 km^{2}) is water.

== Demographics ==
Historical population
Census	Pop.	Note	%±
1880	122		—
1900	362		—
1910	366		1.1%
1920	294		−19.7%
1930	288		−2.0%
1940	300		4.2%
1950	283		−5.7%
1960	265		−6.4%
1970	191		−27.9%
1980	191		0.0%
1990	94		−50.8%
2000	107		13.8%
2010	112		4.7%
2020	76		−32.1%
U.S. Decennial Census

=== 2010 census ===
As of the census of 2010, there were 112 people, 54 households, and 28 families residing in the city. The population density was 466.7 inhabitants per square mile (180.2/km^{2}). There were 74 housing units at an average density of 308.3 per square mile (119.0/km^{2}). The racial makeup of the city was 94.6% White, 1.8% Native American, and 3.6% from two or more races. Hispanic or Latino of any race were 5.4% of the population.

There were 54 households, of which 14.8% had children under the age of 18 living with them, 44.4% were married couples living together, 3.7% had a female householder with no husband present, 3.7% had a male householder with no wife present, and 48.1% were non-families. 35.2% of all households were made up of individuals, and 13% had someone living alone who was 65 years of age or older. The average household size was 2.07 and the average family size was 2.64.

The median age in the city was 48 years. 15.2% of residents were under the age of 18; 12.6% were between the ages of 18 and 24; 17.1% were from 25 to 44; 28.5% were from 45 to 64; and 26.8% were 65 years of age or older. The gender makeup of the city was 51.8% male and 48.2% female.

=== 2000 census ===
As of the census of 2000, there were 107 people, 56 households, and 31 families residing in the city. The population density was 422.3 inhabitants per square mile (163.1/km^{2}). There were 82 housing units at an average density of 323.6 per square mile (124.9/km^{2}). The racial makeup of the city was 99.07% White and 0.93% Native American. Hispanic or Latino of any race were 5.61% of the population.

There were 56 households, out of which 14.3% had children under the age of 18 living with them, 51.8% were married couples living together, 3.6% had a female householder with no husband present, and 42.9% were non-families. 41.1% of all households were made up of individuals, and 26.8% had someone living alone who was 65 years of age or older. The average household size was 1.91 and the average family size was 2.53.

In the city, the population was spread out, with 12.1% under the age of 18, 8.4% from 18 to 24, 10.3% from 25 to 44, 34.6% from 45 to 64, and 34.6% who were 65 years of age or older. The median age was 56 years. For every 100 females, there were 94.5 males. For every 100 females age 18 and over, there were 84.3 males.

The median income for a household in the city was $24,167, and the median income for a family was $52,188. Males had a median income of $36,250 versus $11,000 for females. The per capita income for the city was $17,082. There were 8.0% of families and 9.9% of the population living below the poverty line, including 10.0% of under eighteens and 9.8% of those over 64.

== Education ==
The community and nearby rural areas are served by Vermillion USD 380 public school district.

== See also ==
- Central Branch Union Pacific Railroad
