= Blaine, Kansas =

Unincorporated community in Pottawatomie County, Kansas

- Unincorporated community
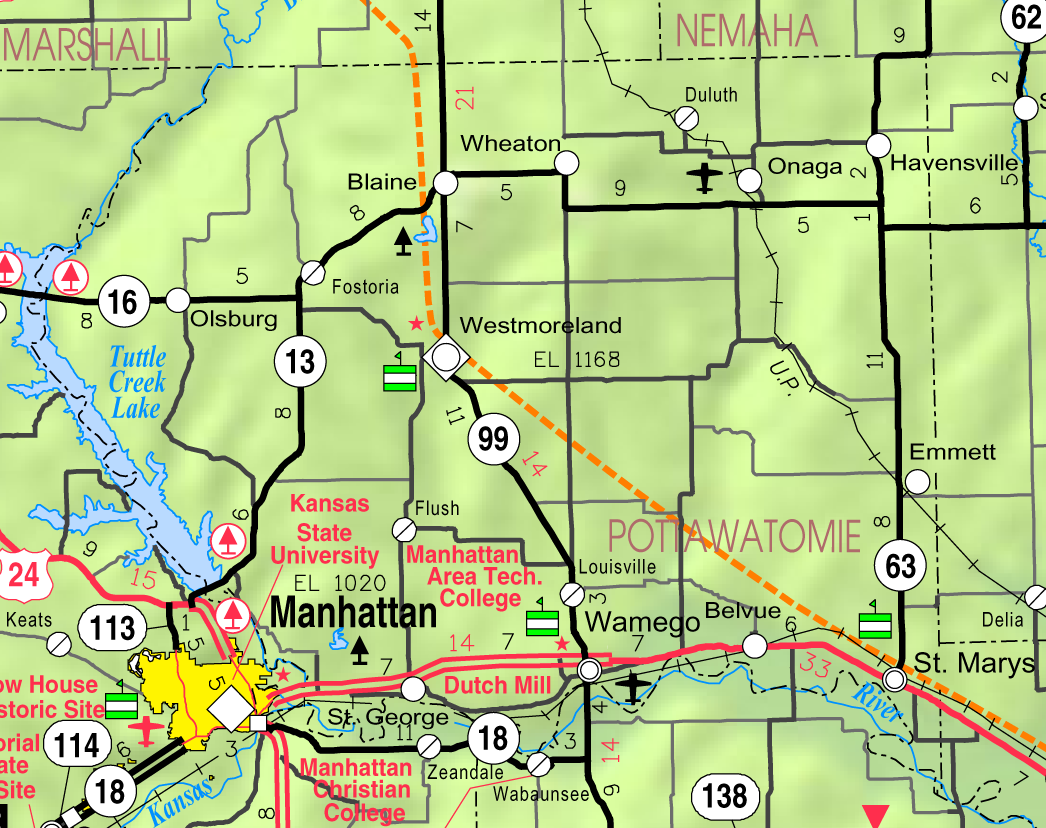
- KDOT map of Pottawatomie County (legend)

- Location within Kansas Location within the United States
- Coordinates: 39°29′48″N 96°24′11″W
- Country: United States
- State: Kansas
- County: Pottawatomie
- Founded: 1873
- Platted: 1879
- Elevation: 1,506 ft (459 m)
- Time zone: UTC-6 (CST)
  - Summer (DST): UTC-5 (CDT)
- Area code: 785
- FIPS code: 20-07175
- GNIS ID: 473415

Blaine is an unincorporated community in Pottawatomie County, Kansas, United States. It is located 29 miles northeast of Manhattan at the crossroads of K-99 and K-16.

== History ==
Many of the first settlers or their family members had originally immigrated to America during the Great Famine of Ireland and then slowly moved westward. The immigrants established the settlement of Butler City along Bluff Creek which served as the first settlers' main water source. Butler City was officially platted at tier 6 south, ranges 9 and 10 east on October 14, 1879; the young town's namesake was Father Thomas Ambrose Butler, an Irish Priest in St. Louis, who encouraged the original settlers to "colonize" in and around modern day Blaine. The community initially was settled by 60 Irish Catholics families in 1873. The Irish emigrants came from a poor Irish neighborhood of St. Louis known as the "Kerry Patch". A post office was opened in Butler City in 1874

Since another town was already named Butler City in Kansas, residents decided to rename the town to Blaine after James G. Blaine. A railway was built a short time later. The rail line that originally ran through Blaine was built as a narrow-gauge railroad called the Kansas Central. It was standard-gauged by the Union Pacific and was finally abandoned in 1934. Another little railroad was built from Blaine seven miles south to Westmoreland called the Kansas, Southern & Gulf Railway. It was later changed to the Westmoreland Interurban Railway and used a touring car and trailer on railroad wheels to move freight. It was razed in 1915.

Although Irish Catholics made up the majority of Blaine and the surrounding area, these people did not exist in cultural isolation. The original Irish settlers in Blaine were joined by a few German families throughout the latter part of the 19th century. At Blaine's peak, there were approximately 200 people living in the community. It has declined to around 30, a majority of whom are descendants of the original settlers.

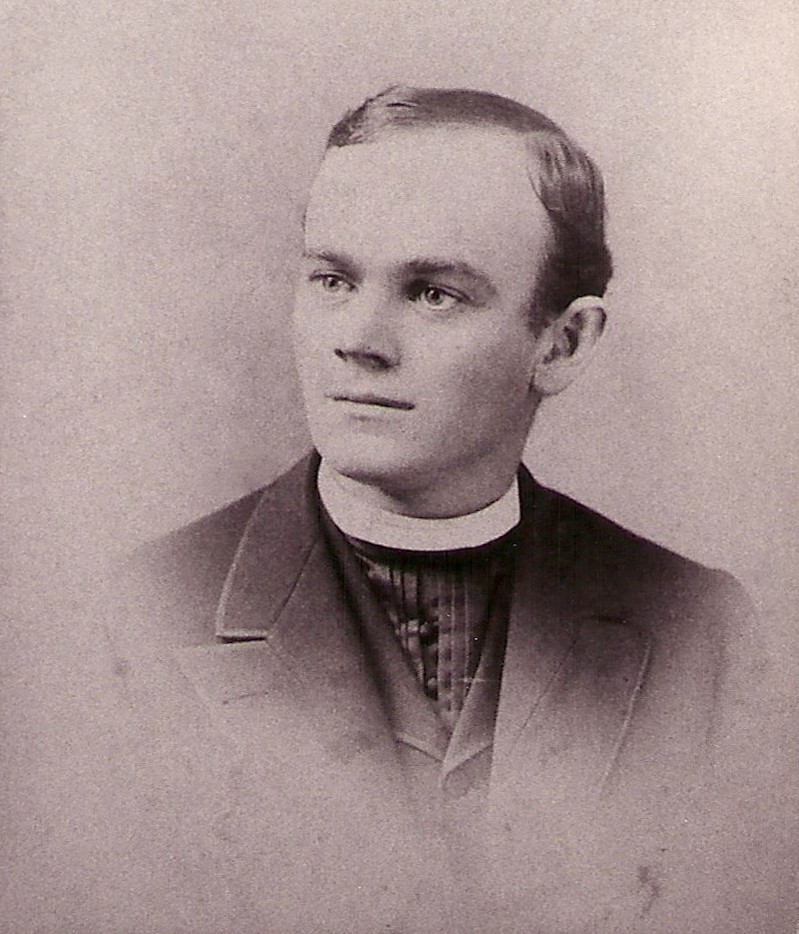
Thomas Butler, for whom the town was originally named.

The original planned layout for Butler City.

== Demographics ==
=== Religion ===
Blaine was historically, and is still primarily Catholic. In 1881, the first church building was completed. The church was named St. Columbkille Catholic Church (St. Colmcille) and Mount Calvary cemetery was established in 1885. In 1908, a larger red brick gothic-style church was built to replace the previous church. Its Knights of Columbus Council was chartered in 1921, and remains active. The church has remained open though parish consolidation has occurred in rural areas. Weekly Mass is still celebrated, although instead of a resident priest, the parish shares a priest with several other churches in the area.

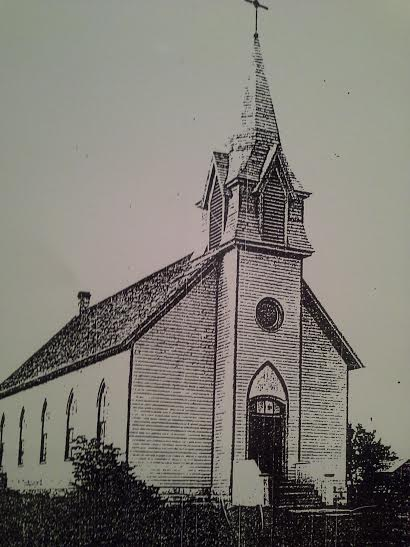
The original wood-frame church in Butler City.

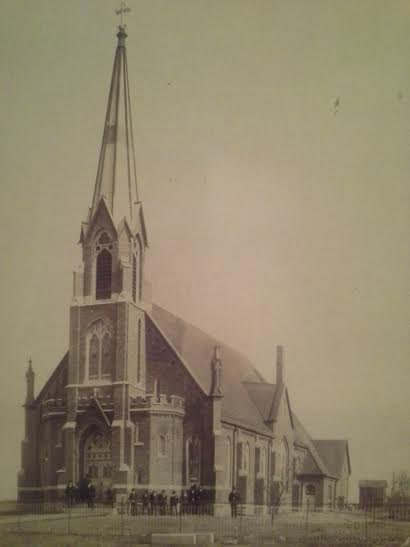
The earliest photograph of the still standing church in Blaine.

== Education ==
The community is served by Rock Creek USD 323 public school district.

A Catholic school was opened in 1919 and was active until 1966. A storm damaged both the school and church in June 2010, the church was fixed but the school couldn't be economically repaired, so it was razed. Soon afterward, a new parish community center was built to hold social functions.

== Notable people ==
- Thomas Butler (1837–1897), Irish American Catholic Priest known for his writings on Irish Immigration and his promotion of Irish settlements in the state of Kansas, as well as the founding of Butler City.
