= St. Marys Township, Kansas =

Township in Pottawatomie County, Kansas, U.S.

St. Marys Township
- Township
- Location within Pottawatomie County
- Coordinates: 39.225094°N 96.080292°W
- Country: United States
- State: Kansas
- County: Pottawatomie
- Established: 1882

Government
  - County Commissioner District 3: Bill Drew

Area
  - Total: 38.435 sq mi (99.55 km^{2})
  - Land: 37.852 sq mi (98.04 km^{2})
  - Water: 0.583 sq mi (1.51 km^{2}) 1.52%

Population (2020)
  - Total: 3,832
  - Density: 101.2/sq mi (39.09/km^{2})
- Time zone: UTC-6 (CST)
  - Summer (DST): UTC-5 (CDT)
- Area code: 785
- GNIS feature ID: 1729704

St. Marys Township is a township in Pottawatomie County, Kansas, United States. As of the 2020 census, its population was 3,832.

== History ==
St. Marys Township was established in 1882.

== Geography ==
St. Marys Township covers an area of 38.435 square miles (99.55 square kilometers). The Kansas River flows through it.

=== Communities ===
- part of St. Marys

=== Adjacent townships ===
Emmett Township, Pottawatomie County
		north	northeast	Washington Township, Jackson County
Belvue Township, Pottawatomie County	west	self	east	Rossville Township, Shawnee County
		south	southeast	Maple Hill Township, Wabaunsee County
Kaw Township, Wabaunsee County

== Transportation ==
=== Major highways ===
- US-24
- K-63
