= Kaw Township, Wabaunsee County, Kansas =

Township in Wabaunsee County, Kansas, U.S.

Kaw Township
- Township
- Location within Wabaunsee County
- Coordinates: 39.166684°N 96.157832°W
- Country: United States
- State: Kansas
- County: Wabaunsee
- Established: 1875

Government
  - Trustee: Bruce Poppelreiter

Area
  - Total: 43.084 sq mi (111.59 km^{2})
  - Land: 42.124 sq mi (109.10 km^{2})
  - Water: 0.96 sq mi (2.5 km^{2}) 2.23%

Population (2020)
  - Total: 250
  - Density: 5.9/sq mi (2.3/km^{2})
- Time zone: UTC-6 (CST)
  - Summer (DST): UTC-5 (CDT)
- Area code: 785
- GNIS feature ID: 476438

Kaw Township is a township in Wabaunsee County, Kansas, United States. As of the 2020 census, its population was 250.

== History ==
Kaw Township was established in July 1875 from part of Newbury Township. The first settlers in what would become Kaw Township were Peter Renow and Henry Reeding, who settled in 1868.

== Geography ==
Kaw Township covers an area of 43.084 square miles (111.59 km^{2}), 2.23% of it water. The Kansas River flows through it, as well as Wells Creek, Little Wells Creek, Roberts Creek, Deep Creek, Doyle Creek, and Turkey Creek.

=== Communities ===
- part of St. Marys

=== Adjacent townships ===
Belvue Township, Pottawatomie County
Wamego Township, Pottawatomie County	northwest	north	northeast	St. Marys Township, Pottawatomie County
Wabaunsee Township, Wabaunsee County	west	self
		south	southeast	Maple Hill Township, Wabaunsee County
Newbury Township, Wabaunsee County

== Demographics ==
As of the 2020 census, the township had a population of 250, giving a population density of 5.9 people per square mile (2.3 people/km^{2}). The racial makeup of the township was 90.0% White, 2.0% Native American, 0.8% from some other race, and 7.2% from two or more races. Hispanics or Latinos of any race were 10.4% of the population.

The 2020–2024 American Community Survey estimated that the township contained 61 households and 61 housing units.
