= Onaga, Kansas =

City in Pottawatomie County, Kansas

- City
- Location within Pottawatomie County and Kansas

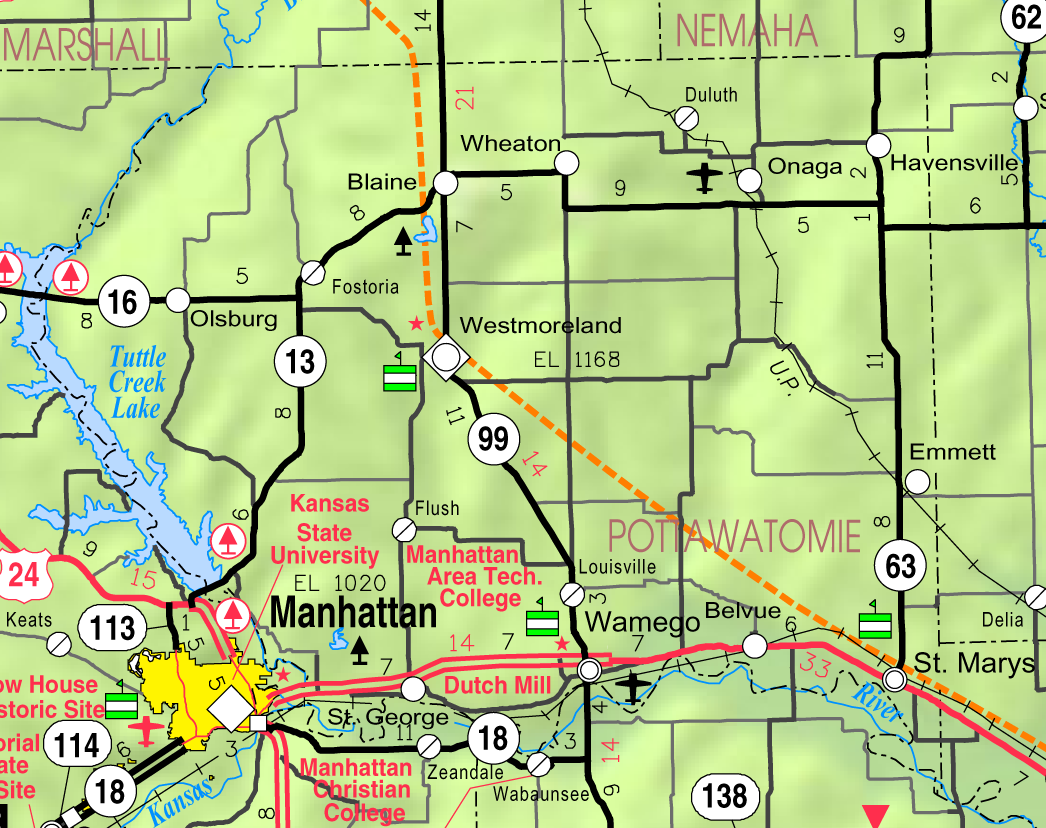
- KDOT map of Pottawatomie County (legend)
- Coordinates: 39°29′21″N 96°10′13″W
- Country: United States
- State: Kansas
- County: Pottawatomie
- Platted: 1877
- Incorporated: by 1881, 1926
- Named for: Onago

Area
  - Total: 0.66 sq mi (1.70 km^{2})
  - Land: 0.66 sq mi (1.70 km^{2})
  - Water: 0 sq mi (0.00 km^{2})
- Elevation: 1,112 ft (339 m)

Population (2020)
  - Total: 679
  - Density: 1,030/sq mi (399/km^{2})
- Time zone: UTC-6 (CST)
  - Summer (DST): UTC-5 (CDT)
- ZIP Code: 66521
- Area code: 785
- FIPS code: 20-52875
- GNIS ID: 2396065
- Website: cityofonaga.com

Onaga is a city in Pottawatomie County, Kansas, United States. As of the 2020 census, the population of the city was 679.

== History ==
Onaga was platted in 1877 by the railroad. Onaga is derived from a Potawatomi personal Indian name (Onago) and was given by Paul E. Havens, President of the Kansas Central Railroad.

The first post office in Onaga was established in December 1877. Onaga originally incorporated as a city by 1881 and reincorporated in 1926.

== Geography ==
According to the United States Census Bureau, the city has a total area of 0.64 square miles (1.66 km^{2}), all land.

=== Climate ===
This climatic region is typified by large seasonal temperature differences, with warm to hot (and often humid) summers and cold (sometimes severely cold) winters. According to the Köppen Climate Classification system, Onaga has a humid continental climate, abbreviated "Dfa" on climate maps.

== Demographics ==
Historical population
Census	Pop.	Note	%±
1880	242		—
1890	423		74.8%
1900	598		41.4%
1910	759		26.9%
1920	838		10.4%
1930	930		11.0%
1940	741		−20.3%
1950	882		19.0%
1960	850		−3.6%
1970	761		−10.5%
1980	752		−1.2%
1990	761		1.2%
2000	704		−7.5%
2010	702		−0.3%
2020	679		−3.3%
U.S. Decennial Census

Onaga is part of the Manhattan, Kansas Metropolitan Statistical Area.

=== 2020 census ===
The 2020 United States census counted 679 people, 267 households, and 156 families in Onaga. The population density was 1,035.1 per square mile (399.6/km^{2}). There were 324 housing units at an average density of 493.9 per square mile (190.7/km^{2}). The racial makeup was 91.46% (621) white or European American (89.69% non-Hispanic white), 0.59% (4) black or African-American, 1.62% (11) Native American or Alaska Native, 1.03% (7) Asian, 0.15% (1) Pacific Islander or Native Hawaiian, 0.88% (6) from other races, and 4.27% (29) from two or more races. Hispanic or Latino of any race was 2.8% (19) of the population.

Of the 267 households, 27.7% had children under the age of 18; 43.8% were married couples living together; 30.3% had a female householder with no spouse or partner present. 38.6% of households consisted of individuals and 21.7% had someone living alone who was 65 years of age or older. The average household size was 1.9 and the average family size was 2.6. The percent of those with a bachelor's degree or higher was estimated to be 24.0% of the population.

24.2% of the population was under the age of 18, 6.0% from 18 to 24, 22.4% from 25 to 44, 20.8% from 45 to 64, and 26.7% who were 65 years of age or older. The median age was 41.8 years. For every 100 females, there were 111.5 males. For every 100 females ages 18 and older, there were 118.2 males.

The 2016–2020 5-year American Community Survey estimates show that the median household income was $41,583 (with a margin of error of +/- $8,010) and the median family income was $66,875 (+/- $30,410). Males had a median income of $44,024 (+/- $1,885) versus $40,096 (+/- $6,619) for females. The median income for those above 16 years old was $43,101 (+/- $1,998). Approximately, 9.0% of families and 12.1% of the population were below the poverty line, including 14.1% of those under the age of 18 and 13.2% of those ages 65 or over.

=== 2010 census ===
As of the census of 2010, there were 702 people, 286 households, and 166 families residing in the city. The population density was 1,096.9 inhabitants per square mile (423.5/km^{2}). There were 359 housing units at an average density of 560.9 per square mile (216.6/km^{2}). The racial makeup of the city was 97.0% White, 0.3% African American, 0.4% Native American, 0.7% Asian, 0.3% from other races, and 1.3% from two or more races. Hispanic or Latino of any race were 2.0% of the population.

There were 286 households, of which 30.8% had children under the age of 18 living with them, 45.5% were married couples living together, 9.4% had a female householder with no husband present, 3.1% had a male householder with no wife present, and 42.0% were non-families. 37.8% of all households were made up of individuals, and 21.6% had someone living alone who was 65 years of age or older. The average household size was 2.32 and the average family size was 3.13.

The median age in the city was 40.8 years. 26.1% of residents were under the age of 18; 5.3% were between the ages of 18 and 24; 22.7% were from 25 to 44; 22.6% were from 45 to 64; and 23.4% were 65 years of age or older. The gender makeup of the city was 46.4% male and 53.6% female.

=== 2000 census ===
As of the census of 2000, there were 704 people, 292 households, and 162 families residing in the city. The population density was 1,109.2 inhabitants per square mile (428.3/km^{2}). There were 347 housing units at an average density of 546.7 per square mile (211.1/km^{2}). The racial makeup of the city was 96.73% White, 0.28% African American, 0.71% Native American, 0.43% Asian, 0.28% from other races, and 1.56% from two or more races. Hispanic or Latino of any race were 2.41% of the population.

There were 292 households, out of which 27.4% had children under the age of 18 living with them, 46.9% were married couples living together, 6.5% had a female householder with no husband present, and 44.5% were non-families. 40.8% of all households were made up of individuals, and 25.7% had someone living alone who was 65 years of age or older. The average household size was 2.21 and the average family size was 3.02.

In the city, the population was spread out, with 23.6% under the age of 18, 6.1% from 18 to 24, 21.2% from 25 to 44, 19.9% from 45 to 64, and 29.3% who were 65 years of age or older. The median age was 44 years. For every 100 females, there were 86.7 males. For every 100 females age 18 and over, there were 81.1 males.

The median income for a household in the city was $28,929, and the median income for a family was $38,173. Males had a median income of $30,347 versus $21,250 for females. The per capita income for the city was $16,219. About 8.4% of families and 13.2% of the population were below the poverty line, including 17.5% of those under age 18 and 9.4% of those age 65 or over.

== Education ==
The community is served by Onaga USD 322 public school district.
