= Powhattan Township, Kansas =

Powhattan Township
- Township
- Location in Brown County
- Coordinates: 39°42′48″N 095°41′11″W
- Country: United States
- State: Kansas
- County: Brown

Area
  - Total: 89.82 sq mi (232.63 km^{2})
  - Land: 89.76 sq mi (232.49 km^{2})
  - Water: 0.054 sq mi (0.14 km^{2}) 0.06%
- Elevation: 1,096 ft (334 m)

Population (2000)
  - Total: 874
  - Density: 9.8/sq mi (3.8/km^{2})
- GNIS feature ID: 0472964

Powhattan Township is a township in Brown County, Kansas, United States. As of the 2000 census, its population was 874.

== Geography ==
Powhattan Township covers an area of 89.82 square miles (232.6 km^{2}) and contains one incorporated settlement, Powhattan. According to the USGS, it contains two cemeteries: Powhattan and South Powhattan.

The streams of Plum Creek, Pony Creek, Roys Creek and Squaw Creek run through this township.

== Transportation ==
Powhattan Township contains one airport or landing strip, Croxton Airport.
