= Elsmore, Kansas =

City in Allen County, Kansas

- City
- Location within Allen County and Kansas

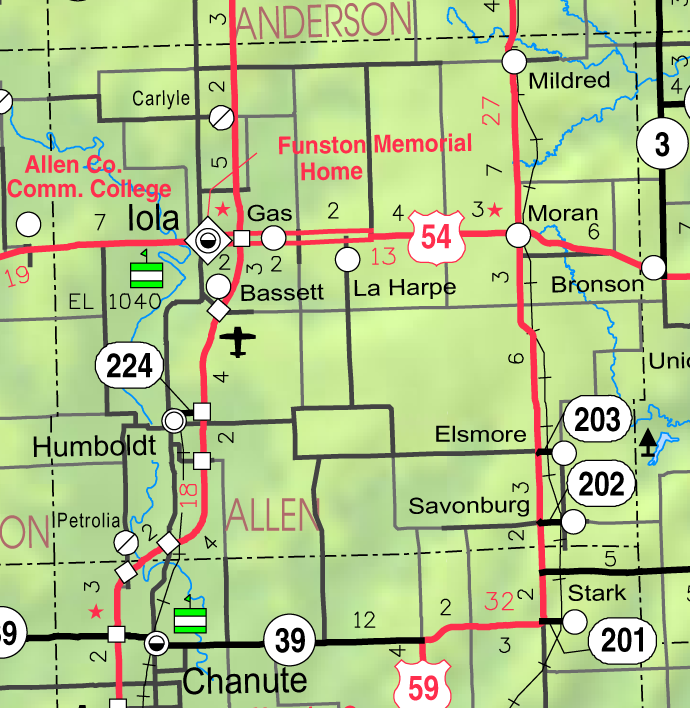
- KDOT map of Allen County (legend)
- Coordinates: 37°47′39″N 95°09′00″W
- Country: United States
- State: Kansas
- County: Allen
- Township: Elsmore
- Founded: 1888
- Incorporated: 1909

Area
  - Total: 0.15 sq mi (0.39 km^{2})
  - Land: 0.15 sq mi (0.39 km^{2})
  - Water: 0 sq mi (0.00 km^{2})
- Elevation: 1,053 ft (321 m)

Population (2020)
  - Total: 50
  - Density: 330/sq mi (130/km^{2})
- Time zone: UTC-6 (CST)
  - Summer (DST): UTC-5 (CDT)
- ZIP Code: 66732
- Area code: 620
- FIPS code: 20-20875
- GNIS ID: 2394679
- Website: elsmorekansas.tripod.com

Elsmore is a city in Elsmore Township, Allen County, Kansas, United States. As of the 2020 census, the population of the city was 50. The name Elsmore is a corruption of Elsinore, where Shakespeare's play Hamlet was set.

== History ==
The old town of Elsmore, which for several years was the center of attraction for the citizens of Elsmore Township, was located farther west, not far from Big Creek. On August 25, 1888, after the route of the Missouri, Kansas & Texas R.R. from Kansas City to Parsons had been definitely settled, N.L. Ard, J.L. Roberts, J.A. Nicholson, W.D. and H.W. Cox, and O.P. Mattson purchased 20 acres (81,000 m^{2}) where the present town of Elsmore stands, and platted the town. It soon became a popular trading center and shipping point for that section of the county, and in 1909 was incorporated. In 1910 it reported a population of 216 and had a money order post office (first opened in November 1866) with two rural delivery routes, a bank, several good stores, some small manufacturing enterprises, telegraph and express facilities.

== Geography ==
Elsmore is located in Section 7, Township 26 south, Range 21 east. Elsmore is situated in the southeastern part of the county in Elsmore Township, some 15 miles (24 km) southeast of the city of Iola (the county seat). U.S. Route 59 passes west of the city, and K-203 is a short connector (less than a mile) between US-59 and the city. The small city of Savonburg lies about 3 miles (4.8 km) to the south, and the larger city of Moran is about nine miles (14 km) to the north (along US-59).

According to the United States Census Bureau, the city has a total area of 0.15 square miles (0.39 km^{2}), all of it land.

== Demographics ==
Historical population
Census	Pop.	Note	%±
1910	216		—
1920	237		9.7%
1930	203		−14.3%
1940	180		−11.3%
1950	152		−15.6%
1960	128		−15.8%
1970	116		−9.4%
1980	104		−10.3%
1990	91		−12.5%
2000	73		−19.8%
2010	77		5.5%
2020	50		−35.1%
U.S. Decennial Census

=== 2020 census ===
The 2020 United States census counted 50 people, 29 households, and 16 families in Elsmore. The population density was 328.9 per square mile (127.0/km^{2}). There were 39 housing units at an average density of 256.6 per square mile (99.1/km^{2}). The racial makeup was 98.0% (49) white or European American (98.0% non-Hispanic white), 0.0% (0) black or African-American, 0.0% (0) Native American or Alaska Native, 0.0% (0) Asian, 0.0% (0) Pacific Islander or Native Hawaiian, 0.0% (0) from other races, and 2.0% (1) from two or more races. Hispanic or Latino of any race was 0.0% (0) of the population.

Of the 29 households, 37.9% had children under the age of 18; 31.0% were married couples living together; 27.6% had a female householder with no spouse or partner present. 34.5% of households consisted of individuals and 17.2% had someone living alone who was 65 years of age or older. The average household size was 2.3 and the average family size was 3.4. The percent of those with a bachelor's degree or higher was estimated to be 6.0% of the population.

22.0% of the population was under the age of 18, 6.0% from 18 to 24, 22.0% from 25 to 44, 24.0% from 45 to 64, and 26.0% who were 65 years of age or older. The median age was 45.0 years. For every 100 females, there were 92.3 males. For every 100 females ages 18 and older, there were 85.7 males.

The 2016–2020 5-year American Community Survey estimates show that the median family income was $51,875 (+/- $39,023). Males had a median income of $27,188 (+/- $20,514) versus $26,667 (+/- $7,052) for females. The median income for those above 16 years old was $26,964 (+/- $3,440).

=== 2010 census ===
As of the census of 2010, there were 77 people, 35 households, and 22 families residing in the city. The population density was 513.3 inhabitants per square mile (198.2/km^{2}). There were 47 housing units at an average density of 313.3 per square mile (121.0/km^{2}). The racial makeup of the city was 100.0% White.

There were 35 households, of which 25.7% had children under the age of 18 living with them, 45.7% were married couples living together, 8.6% had a female householder with no husband present, 8.6% had a male householder with no wife present, and 37.1% were non-families. 34.3% of all households were made up of individuals, and 22.8% had someone living alone who was 65 years of age or older. The average household size was 2.20 and the average family size was 2.68.

The median age in the city was 47.8 years. 22.1% of residents were under the age of 18; 5.2% were between the ages of 18 and 24; 19.5% were from 25 to 44; 23.4% were from 45 to 64; and 29.9% were 65 years of age or older. The gender makeup of the city was 48.1% male and 51.9% female.

=== 2000 census ===
As of the U.S. Census in 2000, there were 73 people, 35 households, and 21 families residing in the city. The population density was 476.3 inhabitants per square mile (183.9/km^{2}). There were 43 housing units at an average density of 280.5 per square mile (108.3/km^{2}). The racial makeup of the city was 95.89% White, 2.74% Native American, and 1.37% from two or more races.

There were 35 households, out of which 11.4% had children under the age of 18 living with them, 45.7% were married couples living together, 2.9% had a female householder with no husband present, and 40.0% were non-families. 31.4% of all households were made up of individuals, and 14.3% had someone living alone who was 65 years of age or older. The average household size was 2.09 and the average family size was 2.43.

In the city, the population was spread out, with 15.1% under the age of 18, 8.2% from 18 to 24, 23.3% from 25 to 44, 23.3% from 45 to 64, and 30.1% who were 65 years of age or older. The median age was 52 years. For every 100 females, there were 143.3 males. For every 100 females age 18 and over, there were 138.5 males.

The median income for a household in the city was $29,375, and the median income for a family was $33,750. Males had a median income of $30,417 versus $20,625 for females. The per capita income for the city was $20,600. There were 16.7% of families and 11.9% of the population living below the poverty line, including 50.0% of under eighteens and none of those over 64.

== Education ==
Elsmore is a part of USD 256 Marmaton Valley Schools. The district high school is Marmaton Valley High School, located in Moran. Marmaton Valley High School mascot is Wildcats.

Elsmore schools were closed through school unification. The Elsmore High School mascot was Elsmore Dragons.

== Transportation ==
The nearest intercity bus stop is located in Gas. Service is provided by Jefferson Lines on a route from Minneapolis to Tulsa.
