= Bayard, Kansas =

Unincorporated community in Allen County, Kansas

- Unincorporated community
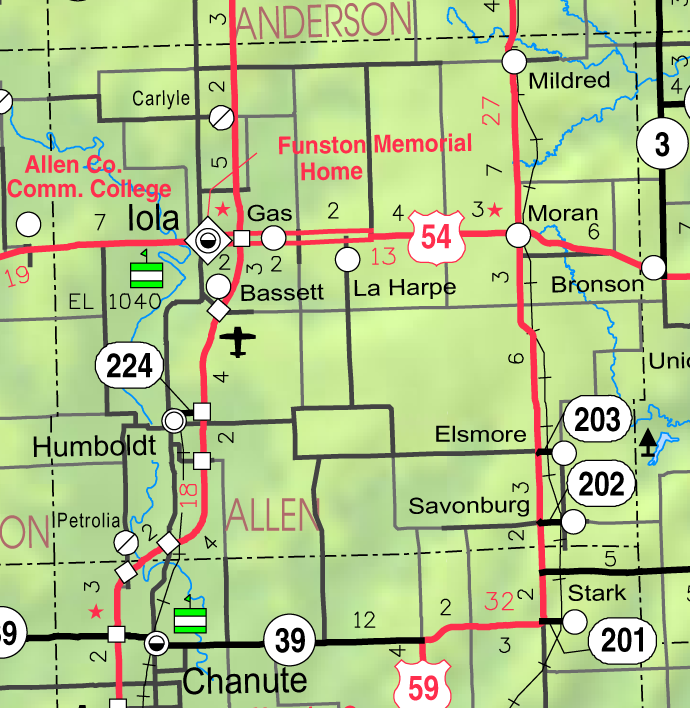
- KDOT map of Allen County (legend)

- Location within Kansas Location within the United States
- Coordinates: 37°59′37″N 95°09′47″W
- Country: United States
- State: Kansas
- County: Allen
- Township: Osage
- Elevation: 1,017 ft (310 m)
- Time zone: UTC-6 (CST)
  - Summer (DST): UTC-5 (CDT)
- ZIP Code: 66755
- Area code: 620
- FIPS code: 20-04650
- GNIS ID: 482698

Bayard is an unincorporated community in Osage Township, Allen County, Kansas, United States.

== History ==
In 1910, Bayard was a station on the Missouri, Kansas & Texas Railroad with a money order postoffice with one rural route, an express office, and some mercantile interests. It was a shipping point for the surrounding agricultural district. The population that year was reported as 50.

A post office was opened in Front (an extinct town) in June 1886, but it was moved to Bayard in August 1887 and remained in operation until it was discontinued in April 1943.

== Geography ==
Bayard is located in Section 36, Township 23 south, Range 20 east and Section 1, Township 24 south, Range 20 east. It is situated along the northern bank of a minor creek which empties into the South Fork Little Osage River. Contained entirely within Osage Township in Allen County, it is about 15 miles northeast of Iola (the county seat). Bayard lies less than a mile east of U.S. Route 59 (a north–south route) where Texas Road crosses a Union Pacific railroad. The tiny incorporated city of Mildred is just 2 miles to the north along US-59, and the larger city of Moran is more than 5 miles to the south.

== Transportation ==
The nearest intercity bus stop is located in Gas. Service is provided by Jefferson Lines on a route from Minneapolis to Tulsa.
