= Carlyle, Kansas =

Unincorporated community in Allen County, Kansas

- Unincorporated community
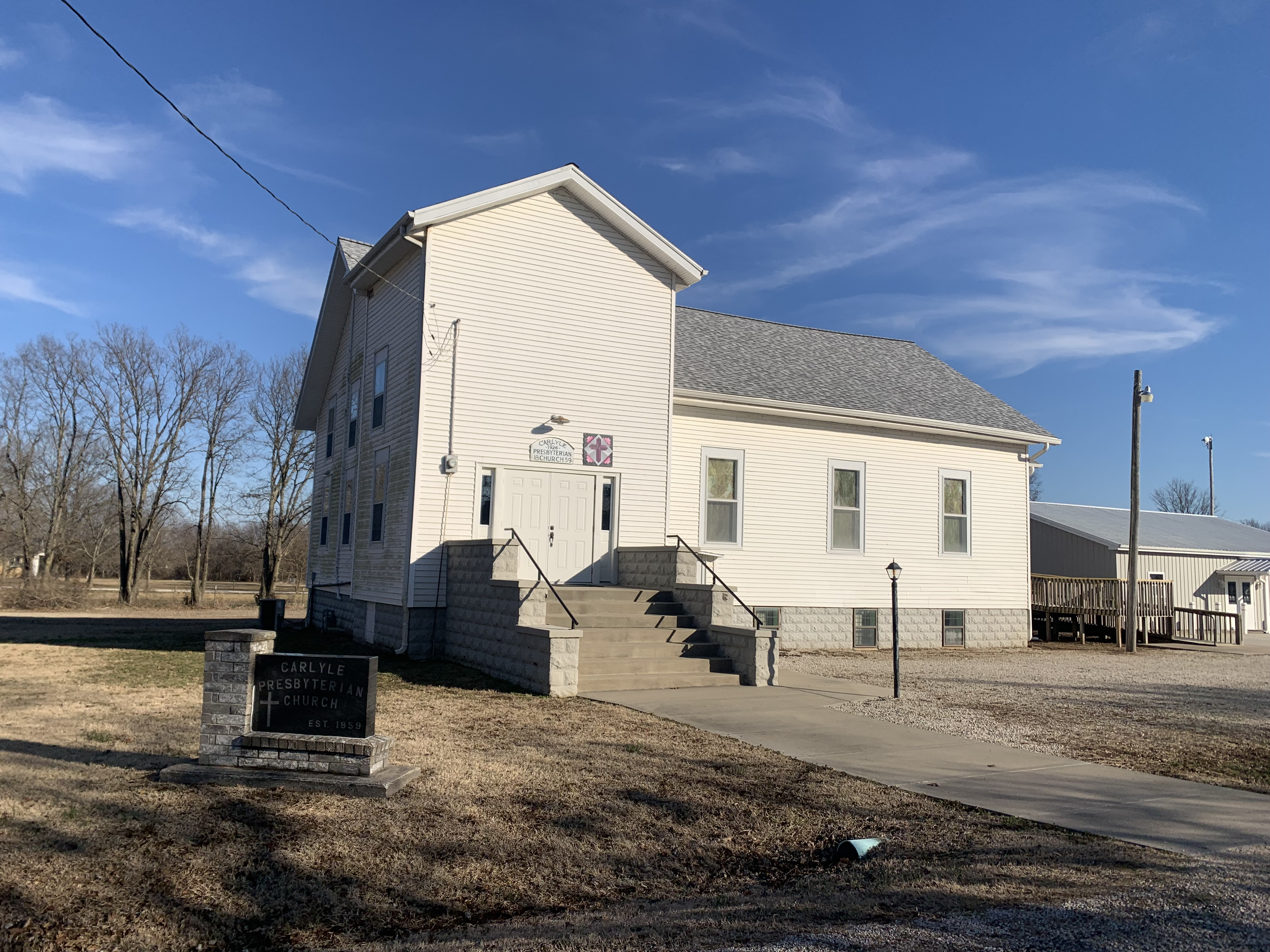
- Carlyle Presbyterian Church at Carlyle (2026)

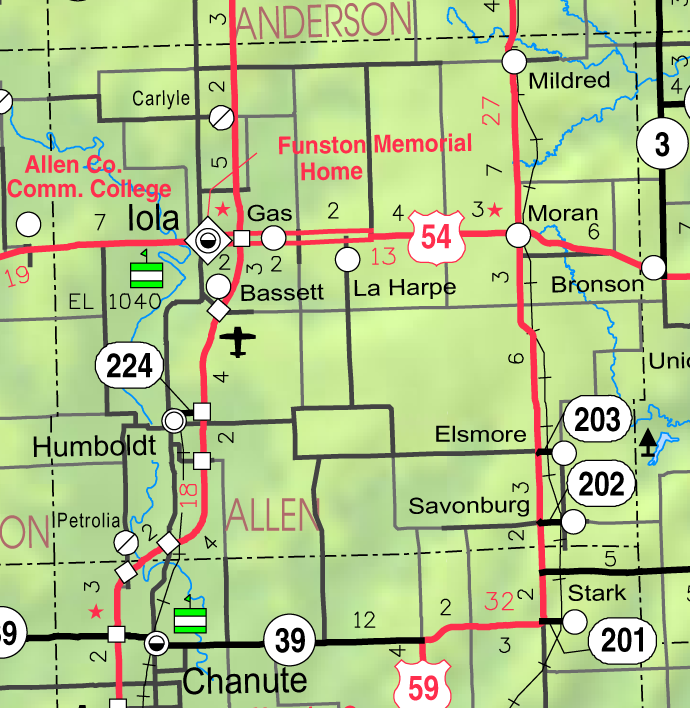
- KDOT map of Allen County (legend)

- Location within Kansas Location within the United States
- Coordinates: 37°59′37″N 95°23′27″W
- Country: United States
- State: Kansas
- County: Allen
- Township: Carlyle
- Founded: 1858
- Elevation: 997 ft (304 m)
- Time zone: UTC-6 (CST)
  - Summer (DST): UTC-5 (CDT)
- ZIP Code: 66749
- Area code: 620
- FIPS code: 20-10700
- GNIS ID: 484351

Carlyle is an unincorporated community in Carlyle Township, Allen County, Kansas, United States.

== History ==
A great part of the settlement in Allen County during the year 1858 was in what is now Deer Creek Township, along and near Deer Creek. In the fall of 1857, a small colony had been formed in Parke and Johnson counties, Indiana, for the purpose of making a settlement, and building up a town, which was to be named Carlyle. After the selection of the site north of Deer Creek, in 1857, two young men, P.M. Carnine and R.V. Ditmars were left to build cabins. In the spring of 1858, the colonists began to arrive. Among the first were T.P. Killen, J.M. Evans, S.C. Richards, J.W. Scott, David Bergen, and H. Scott. The Carlyle colony selected 320 acres (1.3 km^{2}) for a town site and proposed to build a church, schoolhouse and make other improvements calculated to insure the speedy building up of the proposed town. Finding many difficulties in the way of making a prosperous town, the project was abandoned, and the site cut up into farms, which were soon opened.

Though not successful in building a town, the colony prospered. A post office was secured, and a postal route established from Leavenworth via Hyatt, in Anderson County, Carlyle and Cofachique to Humboldt, in 1858. A church and schoolhouse was afterward built, a high school kept up, and part of the time there has been a store, while it had always retained the post office. Carlyle was well known and it had always been a prosperous and progressive neighborhood. When the Leavenworth, Lawrence and Galveston railroad (later the K.C., L. & S.K. R.R.) was built, Carlyle was made a station.

The post office was finally closed in November 1988.

The railroad tracks in Carlyle have since been converted to a rail trail. The trail is part of the Prairie Spirit Trail State Park.

== Geography ==
Carlyle is located in Township 23–24 south, Range 18 east. Contained entirely within Carlyle Township in Allen County, it is about five miles (8 km) north of Iola (the county seat), at the intersection of Texas Road and CR 1600 and less than a mile west of U.S. Route 169. An abandoned railroad passes to the east of Carlyle.

== Demographics ==
Although official populations are not compiled for unincorporated places, the population of the surrounding Carlyle Township was 276 in the 2000 census.

== Transportation ==
The nearest intercity bus stop is located in Gas. Service is provided by Jefferson Lines on a route from Minneapolis to Tulsa.
