= Geneva, Kansas =

Unincorporated community in Allen County, Kansas

- Unincorporated community
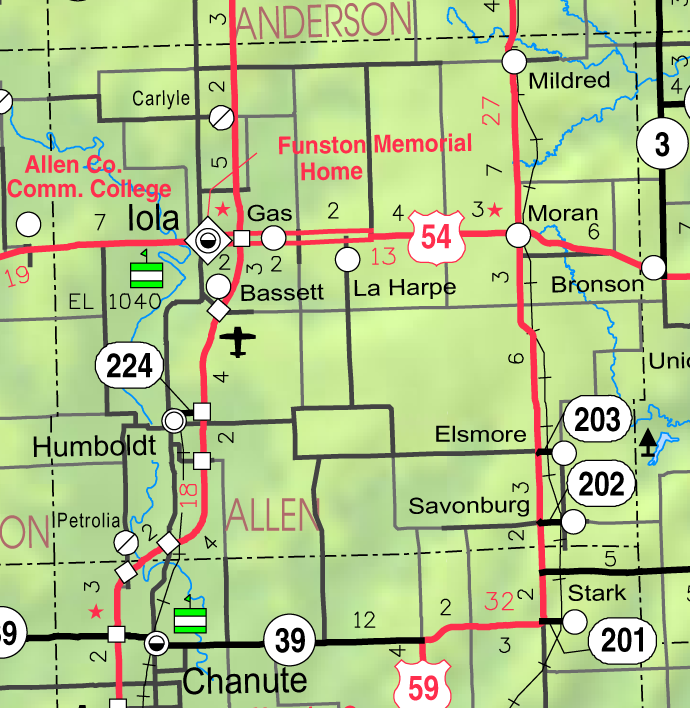
- KDOT map of Allen County (legend)

- Location within Kansas Location within the United States
- Coordinates: 38°1′1″N 95°29′39″W
- Country: United States
- State: Kansas
- County: Allen
- Township: Geneva
- Founded: 1857
- Elevation: 1,020 ft (310 m)
- Time zone: UTC-6 (CST)
  - Summer (DST): UTC-5 (CDT)
- ZIP Code: 66749 (Iola)
- Area code: 620
- FIPS code: 20-26090
- GNIS ID: 478117

Geneva is an unincorporated community in Geneva Township, Allen County, Kansas, United States.

== History ==
The town of Geneva was founded by free-state men in the summer of 1857. A colony was formed in New York under the leadership of Ephraim Fisk, and another in Michigan under the leadership of Merritt Moore. These united, forming the Union Settlement Association, among the prominent members in which were Dr. B.L.G. Stone, G.L. Wait, S.T. Jones, Rev. G.S. Northrup, I.A. Holman, P.P. Phillips, E.J. Brinkerhoff, J.H. Spicer, A.P. Sain, H.R. Somers, Frank Ureidenberg, J.C. Redfield, and J.M. Mattoon. The colony selected the northwestern part of Allen County for a location, and started out with great expectations. There were about 300 families engaged to settle at once. It was decided to locate and lay out a town comprising not less than 640 acres (2.6 km^{2}) of land. The site was chosen on account of the fertile prairie land around, as well as the heavy timber so close along the banks of the streams. It was decided to at once begin the building of a large structure and to found a non-sectarian college and academy.

Plans having been made for so much building and so many families having promised to locate, the next thing was to erect a saw-mill. Therefore, a contract was entered into with L.L. Northrup that he should build a steam saw-mill, and that the colony should, in turn, give him 160 acres (0.65 km^{2}) of good timber land and furnish him all the sawing he could do, and pay him $15 per thousand feet. The mill was brought and set up on the bank of Indian Creek, in the summer of the year 1858. But the sawing was not provided in any great quantities and Northrup soon opened a store.

Though the settlement started with such brilliant prospects, the idea of building a large town was soon given up. Not one-fourth of the projected colony of 300 families ever came, and those who did were rather poor, and through the lack of money and settlement the college was not built, though an academy afterward took its place. The settlers from the first were an intelligent and enterprising class of people, who regarded the moral and mental culture of the young as one of the first things to be looked to, after opening their farms, therefore churches and schools were established. There was at first considerable controversy over claims, which resulted in occasional riots, but aside from this the neighborhood had generally been very peaceable.

Geneva continued to exist as a small unincorporated community, and by the year 1869 it contained two stores, one blacksmith shop, a wagon shop, a hotel, a Congregational Church built of stone, and an academy. This building was a frame structure two stories high, and the school had been established in 1866 under charge of the Neosho Presbytery. The population was then about one hundred. By 1872 additional improvements were made, and several business enterprises were undertaken that afterward fell through. It was expected that a railroad would be built through that part of the county, and when the town failed to secure it, it began to decline.

Geneva had a post office from November 1858 until September 1942.

== Geography ==
Geneva is located in Section 25, Township 23 south, Range 17 east. It is situated north of the Neosho River, and between Martin and Indian creeks. Contained entirely within Geneva Township in Allen County, it is about 10 miles northwest of Iola (the county seat).

== Transportation ==
The nearest intercity bus stop is located in Gas. Service is provided by Jefferson Lines on a route from Minneapolis to Tulsa.
