= Elm Township, Kansas =

Elm Township
- Township
- Location in Allen County
- Coordinates: 37°54′26″N 095°17′56″W
- Country: United States
- State: Kansas
- County: Allen

Area
  - Total: 47.6 sq mi (123.3 km^{2})
  - Land: 47.1 sq mi (122.0 km^{2})
  - Water: 0.50 sq mi (1.3 km^{2}) 1.0%
- Elevation: 1,024 ft (312 m)

Population (2010)
  - Total: 1,257
  - Density: 27/sq mi (10.3/km^{2})
- GNIS feature ID: 0474514

Elm Township is one of twelve townships in Allen County, Kansas, United States. As of the 2010 census, its population was 1,257.

== Geography ==
Elm Township covers an area of 47.6 square miles (123.3 km^{2}). It contains one incorporated settlement and surrounds another, the governmentally independent city of La Harpe. According to the USGS, it contains two cemeteries: La Harpe and Saint Johns.

=== Communities ===
- Gas

== Transportation ==
Elm Township contains two airports or landing strips: Midway Air Park and National Airport.
