= Bassett, Kansas =

City in Allen County, Kansas

- City
- Location within Allen County and Kansas

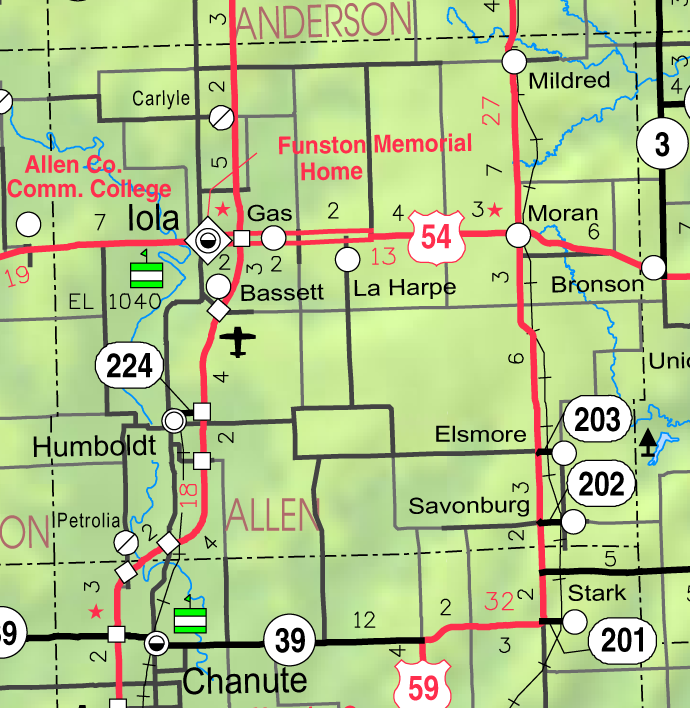
- KDOT map of Allen County (legend)
- Coordinates: 37°54′23″N 95°24′27″W
- Country: United States
- State: Kansas
- County: Allen
- Township: Iola
- Founded: 1903
- Incorporated: 1903

Area
  - Total: 0.097 sq mi (0.25 km^{2})
  - Land: 0.066 sq mi (0.17 km^{2})
  - Water: 0.031 sq mi (0.08 km^{2})
- Elevation: 955 ft (291 m)

Population (2020)
  - Total: 20
  - Density: 300/sq mi (120/km^{2})
- Time zone: UTC-6 (CST)
  - Summer (DST): UTC-5 (CDT)
- ZIP Code: 66749 (Iola)
- Area code: 620
- FIPS code: 20-04450
- GNIS ID: 2394075

Bassett is a city in Iola Township, Allen County, Kansas, United States. It is situated along the Neosho River. As of the 2020 census, the population of the city was 20.

== History ==
Bassett was founded in 1903. The following year the Bassett and Concreto extensions were made to the Iola Electric Railroad street car line. In 1914, the first concrete road in Kansas was laid in Bassett.

== Geography ==
Bassett is situated east of the Neosho River along the south bank of Elm Creek in Iola Township, and it lies adjacent to the southern border of the city of Iola (the county seat). Lake Bassola lies to the east of the city. The city is less than two miles southwest of the interchange between U.S. Routes 54 and 169.

According to the United States Census Bureau, the city has a total area of 0.09 square miles (0.23 km^{2}), of which, 0.06 square miles (0.16 km^{2}) is land and 0.03 square miles (0.08 km^{2}) is water.

=== Climate ===
The climate in this area is characterized by hot, humid summers and generally mild to cool winters. According to the Köppen Climate Classification system, Bassett has a humid subtropical climate, abbreviated "Cfa" on climate maps.

== Demographics ==
Historical population
Census	Pop.	Note	%±
1910	415		—
1920	319		−23.1%
1930	194		−39.2%
1940	124		−36.1%
1950	117		−5.6%
1960	67		−42.7%
1970	62		−7.5%
1980	31		−50.0%
1990	20		−35.5%
2000	22		10.0%
2010	14		−36.4%
2020	20		42.9%
U.S. Decennial Census

=== 2020 census ===
The 2020 United States census counted 20 people, 5 households, and 2 families in Bassett. The population density was 298.5 per square mile (115.3/km^{2}). There were 10 housing units at an average density of 149.3 per square mile (57.6/km^{2}). The racial makeup was 75.0% (15) white or European American (75.0% non-Hispanic white), 0.0% (0) black or African-American, 0.0% (0) Native American or Alaska Native, 0.0% (0) Asian, 0.0% (0) Pacific Islander or Native Hawaiian, 0.0% (0) from other races, and 25.0% (5) from two or more races. Hispanic or Latino of any race was 0.0% (0) of the population.

Of the 5 households, 40.0% had children under the age of 18; 20.0% were married couples living together; 40.0% had a female householder with no spouse or partner present. 40.0% of households consisted of individuals and 0.0% had someone living alone who was 65 years of age or older. The average household size was 2.5 and the average family size was 2.5. The percent of those with a bachelor's degree or higher was estimated to be 5.0% of the population.

30.0% of the population was under the age of 18, 0.0% from 18 to 24, 10.0% from 25 to 44, 35.0% from 45 to 64, and 25.0% who were 65 years of age or older. The median age was 49.5 years. For every 100 females, there were 122.2 males. For every 100 females ages 18 and older, there were 100.0 males.

=== 2010 census ===
As of the census of 2010, there were 14 people, 5 households, and 4 families residing in the city. The population density was 233.3 inhabitants per square mile (90.1/km^{2}). There were 10 housing units at an average density of 166.7 per square mile (64.4/km^{2}). The racial makeup of the city was 100.0% White.

There were 5 households, of which 40.0% had children under the age of 18 living with them, 80.0% were married couples living together, and 20.0% were non-families. 0.0% of all households were made up of individuals. The average household size was 2.80 and the average family size was 3.00.

The median age in the city was 38 years. 28.6% of residents were under the age of 18; 7.1% were between the ages of 18 and 24; 35.7% were from 25 to 44; 28.5% were from 45 to 64; and 0.0% were 65 years of age or older. The gender makeup of the city was 64.3% male and 35.7% female.

=== 2000 census ===
As of the U.S. Census in 2000, there were 22 people, 10 households, and 7 families residing in the city. The population density was 309.1 inhabitants per square mile (119.3/km^{2}). There were 10 housing units at an average density of 140.5 per square mile (54.2/km^{2}). The racial makeup of the city was 95.45% White and 4.55% Black or African American.

There were 10 households, out of which 30.0% had children under the age of 18 living with them, 50.0% were married couples living together, 10.0% had a female householder with no husband present, and 30.0% were non-families. 20.0% of all households were made up of individuals, and none had someone living alone who was 65 years of age or older. The average household size was 2.20 and the average family size was 2.14.

In the city, the population was spread out, with 13.6% under the age of 18, 22.7% from 18 to 24, 22.7% from 25 to 44, 31.8% from 45 to 64, and 9.1% who were 65 years of age or older. The median age was 34 years. For every 100 females, there were 120.0 males. For every 100 females age 18 and over, there were 137.5 males.

The median income for a household in the city was $14,688, and the median income for a family was $14,375. Males had a median income of $16,250 versus $0 for females. The per capita income for the city was $12,388. None of the population and none of the families were below the poverty line.

== Government ==
Bassett is incorporated as a city of the third class and, as such, receives services from Iola Township and Allen County.

== Transportation ==
The nearest intercity bus stop is located in Gas. Service is provided by Jefferson Lines on a route from Minneapolis to Tulsa.

== See also ==
- Great Flood of 1951
