= Marmaton Township =

Marmaton Township may refer to the following townships in the United States:

- Marmaton Township, Bourbon County, Kansas
- Marmaton Township, Allen County, Kansas
