= Allen County Jail =

- U.S. National Register of Historic Places
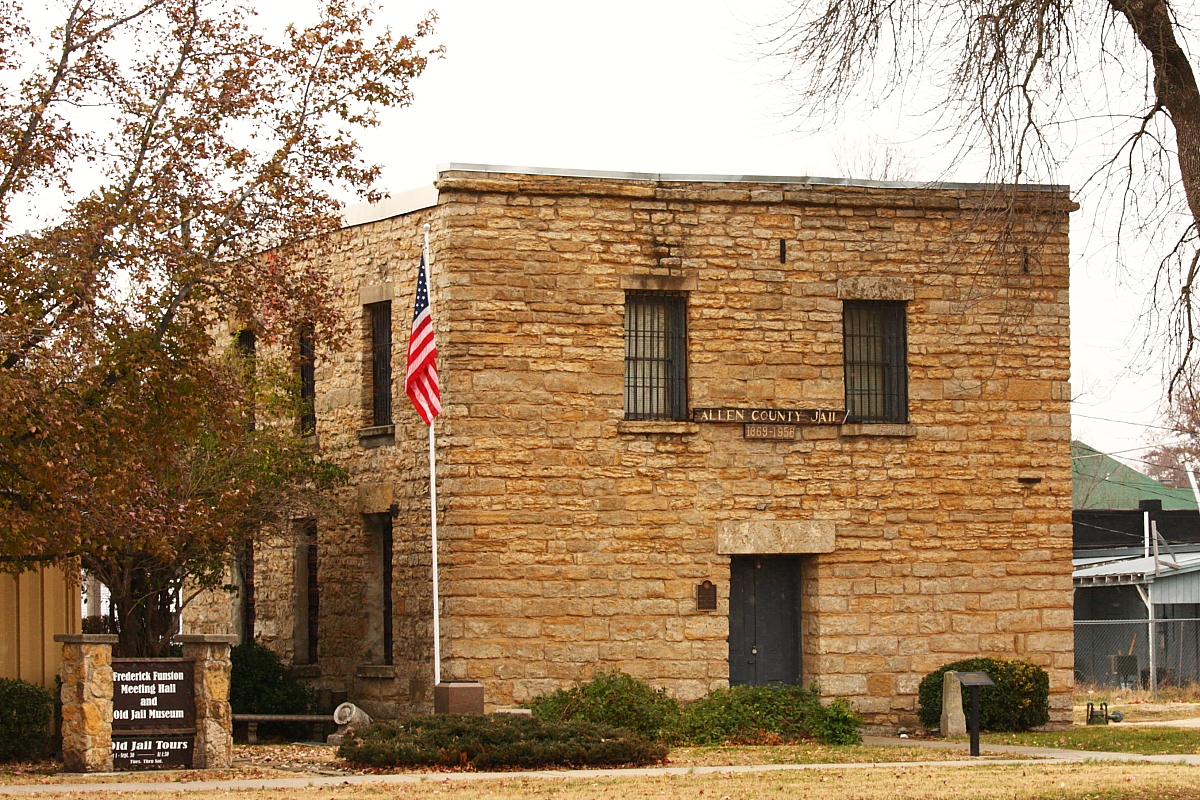
- Front of the jail

- Location within Kansas Location within the United States
- Location: 204 N. Jefferson St., Iola, Kansas
- Coordinates: 37°55′24″N 95°24′10″W
- Area: less than one acre
- Built: 1869
- Architect: White & Hays
- NRHP reference No.: 71000300
- Added to NRHP: January 25, 1971

The Old Allen County Jail is a former jail in Iola, Kansas, United States. Built in the late 1860s, it operated as a detention facility for nearly a century before a replacement opened; today, it is the Old Jail Museum, operated by the Allen County Historical Society, and it has been designated a historic site.

== Structure ==
The jail is a stone rubble masonry structure, two stories tall and constructed of large blocks of limestone. Its walls are approximately 2 feet (0.61 m) thick. As originally designed, the jail contained living space for the jailer on the second story and prison space on the first story; the cells were built of steel bars and placed on the solid stone floor. The facade includes two second-story windows and a central door on the first story. Although it was called the finest jail in southeastern Kansas at the time of its completion, it was never secure; over the course of its history, many prisoners escaped by removing bars from windows or cutting holes in the roof.

== Early history ==
As a result of disputes between residents of different areas of the county, Allen County lacked a jail for its initial years. The situation was resolved in 1868 after voters approved a $10,000 bond for the erection of a jail in Iola. Under the direction of the local contractors White and Hays, the building was finished in October of the following year at a price of $8,400; it was the first public building to be erected by the county government. Due to its reputation as the region's best jail, two other southeastern Kansas counties contracted with Allen County to use the structure for their own prisoners during the 1870s.

== Recent history ==
By the middle of the twentieth century, the original design of the jail had become insufficient for the county's needs. No more did the jailer live in the jail; the first floor cells were abandoned, and the prisoners were confined to the second floor. In the late 1950s, county officials came to the decision that a new jail was needed; a contract for the construction of such a structure was signed in early 1957, and the new jail opened in January 1959. During this process, many local citizens expressed a desire to see the old jail preserved; the 1957 Kansas Legislature passed a law to permit the county to convey to the Allen County Historical Society, which has since converted it into a museum.

In 1971, the jail was listed on the National Register of Historic Places because of its significant place in local history; key to its inclusion was its place as the first building erected by Allen County and its service as a rural jail for nearly ninety years. It was Allen County's only National Register property for over twenty-five years, until Iola's Northrup House was added to the Register in 1997.

The current Allen County jail was built in 2004.
