= Carlyle Township =

Carlyle Township may refer to the following townships in the United States:

- Carlyle Township, Clinton County, Illinois
- Carlyle Township, Allen County, Kansas
