= Humboldt Township, Kansas =

Humboldt Township
- Township
- Location in Allen County
- Coordinates: 37°49′25″N 095°25′06″W
- Country: United States
- State: Kansas
- County: Allen

Area
  - Total: 25.2 sq mi (65.3 km^{2})
  - Land: 24.7 sq mi (64.0 km^{2})
  - Water: 0.46 sq mi (1.2 km^{2}) 1.9%
- Elevation: 991 ft (302 m)

Population (2010)
  - Total: 253
  - Density: 10/sq mi (4/km^{2})
- GNIS feature ID: 0474722

Humboldt Township is one of twelve townships in Allen County, Kansas, United States. As of the 2010 census, its population was 253.

== Geography ==
Humboldt Township covers an area of 25.2 square miles (65.3 km^{2}) and contains one incorporated settlement, Humboldt. According to the USGS, it contains three cemeteries: Evan Young, Fussman and Saint Joseph.

The streams of Charles Branch and Slack Creek run through this township.
