= Prairie Spirit Trail State Park =

Kansas state park

Prairie Spirit Trail State Park is a rail trail that is a Kansas State Park.

The trail is built on the former right of way of the Leavenworth, Lawrence and Galveston Railroad from Ottawa, Kansas, to Iola, Kansas. The trail runs 50 miles from its northern terminus at Ottawa, Kansas to its southern terminus at Iola, Kansas.

The trail is open for use by hikers, joggers, and bicyclists year-round, from sunrise to sunset. This trail is paved with a hard-packed limestone screening outside of the city limits of Ottawa, Garnett, and Iola. Inside Ottawa, Garnett, and Iola, the trail is paved with asphalt. As of January 1st, 2019 a trail use permit is no longer required.

During flooding in June 2007, a section of the bridge carrying the trail over Pottawatomie Creek north of Garnett washed out. The bridge has since been replaced.

== Trail Route ==
The trail's northern terminus is located at the Old Depot Museum in Ottawa, Kansas at 38°37′13″N 95°16′12″W. The Museum and terminus of the trail is located just north of the Marais Des Cygnes River in downtown Ottawa. From Ottawa, the trail heads south and detours from the right of way to cross under Interstate 35 at its intersection with US Highway 59.

Continuing to the south from Ottawa, the trail hits two small railroad towns, Princeton and Richmond. Garnett, located about midway on the 50-mile (80 km) right of way between Ottawa and Iola features a restored Santa Fe depot which is used as the city's trailhead. The depot serves as a rest stop for trail users, as well as an information center for the city.

Phase 3 of the trail spans from Welda, Kansas, to Iola, Kansas, passing the small towns of Colony and Carlyle. Colony and Iola trailheads feature both restrooms and water, while the Carlyle trailhead has only a single restroom without water. Trail mile markers for phase three include mile 99 at Colony, mile 104 at Carlyle, Kansas, and mile 109 at the Iola terminating trailhead at 37°56′10″N 95°24′32″W.

== Future expansion ==
The trail has been developed southward from the Iola trailhead to the town of Humboldt, about nine miles, led through the efforts of Thrive Allen County, a community organization, and the Allen County local government. This extension is named the Southwind Rail-Trail, and opened to the public on June 10, 2013. Future aspirations of the trail include intersecting the Flint Hills Trail, a 117-mile (188 km) trail under construction (as of 2024) connecting Herington, Kansas, to the west, and Osawatomie, Kansas, to the east, in Ottawa. The eastern section from Ottawa to Osawatomie is completed. This trail is also part of the ambitious Quad-State Trail project which will connect trails together in Nebraska, Kansas, Missouri, and Iowa. The project also includes the Katy Trail State Park in Missouri.

== Management ==
The park is routinely patrolled by staff of the Kansas Department of Wildlife, Parks and Tourism and other law-enforcement agencies. Only non-motorized vehicles, and motorized wheelchairs, are allowed.
