= Petrolia, Kansas =

Unincorporated community in Allen County, Kansas

- Unincorporated community
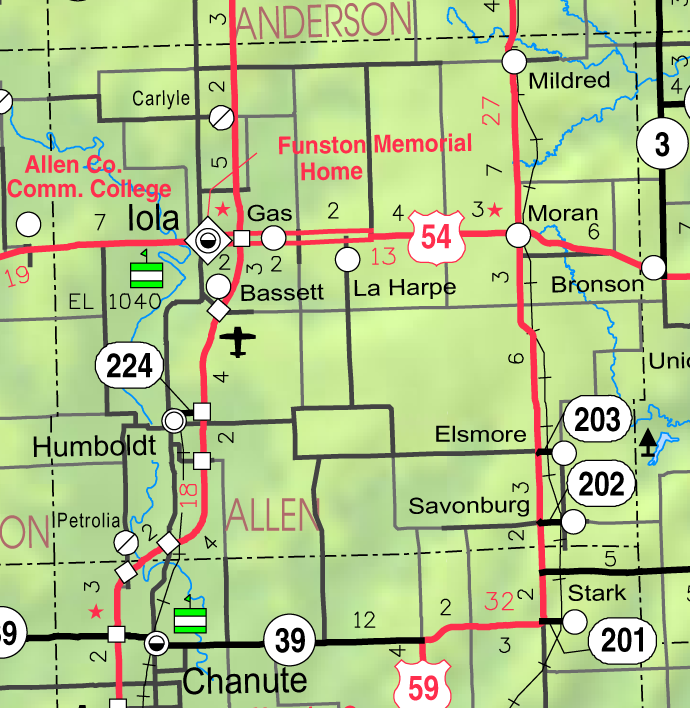
- KDOT map of Allen County (legend)

- Location within Kansas Location within the United States
- Coordinates: 37°44′45″N 95°28′18″W
- Country: United States
- State: Kansas
- County: Allen
- Township: Logan
- Elevation: 955 ft (291 m)
- Time zone: UTC-6 (CST)
  - Summer (DST): UTC-5 (CDT)
- ZIP Code: 66720
- Area code: 620
- FIPS code: 20-55625
- GNIS ID: 474962

Petrolia is an unincorporated community in Logan Township, Allen County, Kansas, United States. It is situated along the Neosho River.

== History ==
In 1910, Petrolia had a money order postoffice, an express office, and was a trading point for the neighborhood. The population that year was 200.

Petrolia had a post office from July 1905 until September 1953.

== Geography ==
Petrolia is located in Sections 31–32, Township 26 south, Range 18 east. Less than a mile from the southern border of Allen County, it is situated west of the Neosho River and to the south of Scatter Creek. Contained entirely within Logan Township, it is about 5 miles south-southwest of Humboldt and 13 miles from Iola (the county seat). U.S. Route 169 crosses the Neosho River a mile to the south of Petrolia.

== Education ==
The community is served by Chanute USD 413 public school district.

== Transportation ==
The nearest intercity bus stop is located in Chanute. Service is provided by Jefferson Lines on a route from Minneapolis to Tulsa.

== See also ==
- Great Flood of 1951
