= Allen County, Kansas =

County in Kansas, United States

- County
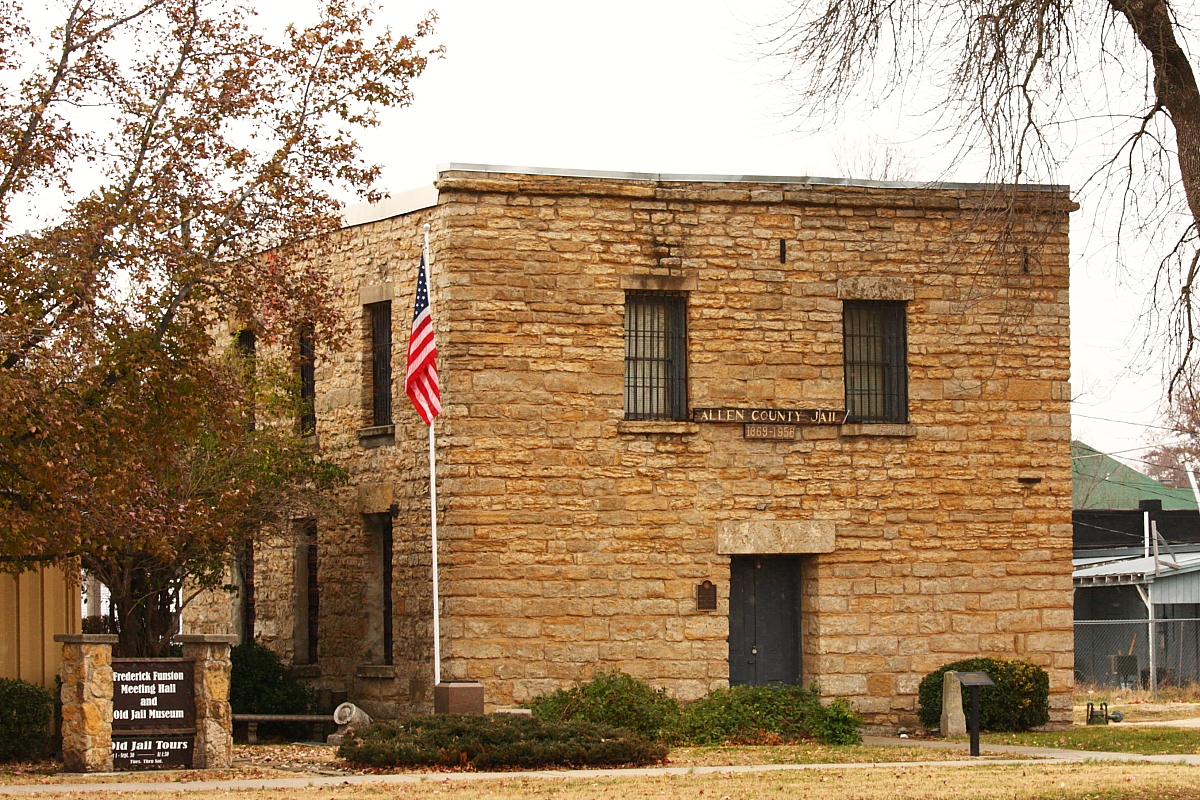
- Old Allen County Jail in Iola (2008)

- Seal

- Location within the U.S. state of Kansas
- Country: United States
- State: Kansas
- Founded: August 25, 1855
- Named for: William Allen
- Seat: Iola
- Largest city: Iola

Area
  - Total: 505 sq mi (1,310 km^{2})
  - Land: 500 sq mi (1,300 km^{2})
  - Water: 5.0 sq mi (13 km^{2}) 1.0%

Population (2020)
  - Total: 12,526
  - Estimate (2025): 12,302 ▼
  - Density: 25.1/sq mi (9.7/km^{2})
- Time zone: UTC−6 (Central)
  - Summer (DST): UTC−5 (CDT)
- Area code: 620
- Congressional district: 2nd
- Website: AllenCounty.org

Allen County is a county located in the southeast portion of the U.S. state of Kansas. Its county seat and most populous city is Iola. As of the 2020 census, the population was 12,526. The county was named for William Allen, a U.S. Senator from Ohio and prominent supporter of westward expansion.

== History ==
=== Early history ===
For many millennia, the Great Plains of North America was inhabited by nomadic Native Americans. From the 16th century to 18th century, the Kingdom of France claimed ownership of large parts of North America. In 1762, after the French and Indian War, France secretly ceded New France to Spain, per the Treaty of Fontainebleau.

=== 19th century ===
In 1802, Spain returned most of the land to France, but keeping title to about 7,500 square miles. In 1803, most of the land for modern day Kansas was acquired by the United States from France as part of the 828,000 square mile Louisiana Purchase for 2.83 cents per acre.

In 1854, the Kansas Territory was organized. Allen County is one of the 33 counties established by the first territorial legislature in August 1855, six years before Kansas statehood in 1861. It was named in honor of William Allen, a United States senator from Ohio. At the time of its creation, Charles Passmore was appointed probate judge; B.W. Cowden and Barnett Owen were appointed county commissioners, and William Godfrey was appointed sheriff. The appointments were temporary until the general election in 1857. The four men were authorized to appoint the county clerk and treasurer thus completing the county organization.

Richard J. Fuqua and his family are considered the first white settlers in the county, arriving in the valley of the Neosho River January 1855. Fuqua established a post for trading with the neighboring Indian tribes which became quite popular with the Sac and Fox Indians. B.W. Cowden and H.D. Parsons arrived in March of the same year and selected claims in the valley of the Neosho River, near the mouth of Elm Creek. The next settlement was made near the mouth of Deer Creek (so named for the abundance of deer in the area) by Major James Parsons, and his two sons, Jesse and James, and a Mr. Duncan. The population grew rapidly through the spring and summer of 1855, most of it located on or near the Neosho River.

Many of the early settlers were pro-slavery, but few slaves were actually brought into the county. The anti-slavery population expressed such antipathy toward their pro-slavery neighbors that slaves within the county there were either freed or taken elsewhere in Kansas by their masters. Immigration continued during the summer and fall of 1856, though in reduced numbers.

The first town and county seat was Cofachique. In the spring of 1855 pro-slavery settlers from Fort Scott laid out the town in a hilly area east of the Neosho River and south of the mouth of Elm Creek. The territorial legislature passed an act in July 1855 incorporating the Cofachique Town Association. It was the only town in Allen County for nearly two years and as such was quite successful; but in 1857 other towns were constructed and Cofachique began to decline almost immediately. One of the reasons for decline was accessibility, the other was a lack of good well water. Another possible contribution to the town's decline involved tensions between the pro and anti-slavery settlers. With the development of neighboring towns Humboldt and Iola the town of Cofachique all but disappeared by 1859. The county seat went briefly to Humboldt in 1857 where it remained until 1865, but with the election of that year Iola took the county seat and has retained this designation to the present.

After a series of disputes between residents in the county over where a county jail should be located, Allen County's first jail was constructed in Iola in 1869 at a cost of $8,400. It operated until a replacement jail house was opened in 1959. Since that time the original jail has been run as a museum.

The last year of the territorial period (1860) was one of the most difficult years since the initial settlement of the county. Periods of drought beginning as early as 1854 had plagued all of Kansas and though 1859 had seen a reprieve, by the end of 1859 and into 1860 the drought worsened. The St. Laurence newspaper reported: "No rain, no snow, and much open, thawing, mild weather, alternated with sharp, though brief [cold] snaps..." Most of the people who had moved to the county in the previous two years were still trying to establish their farms. With the prospect of starvation and hardship before them, many decided to return to the east.

== Geography ==
According to the U.S. Census Bureau, the county has a total area of 505 square miles (1,310 km^{2}), of which 500 square miles (1,300 km^{2}) is land and 5.0 square miles (13 km^{2}) (1.0%) is water. Allen County is located in the southeastern part of the state, in the second tier of counties west of Missouri, and about fifty miles north of Oklahoma. In extent it is twenty-one miles from north to south and twenty-four miles from east to west.

=== Geographic features ===
The general surface of the country is slightly rolling, though much more level than the greater portion of eastern Kansas. The soil is fertile and highly productive. The bottom lands along the streams average one and one-half miles in width, and comprise one-tenth the area of the county. The remainder is the gently rolling or level upland prairie. The principal varieties of trees native to the county are black walnut, hickory, cottonwood, oak, hackberry and elm.

The main water course is the Neosho River, which flows through the western part of the county from north to south. Its tributaries are Indian, Martin's, Deer, Elm, Vegetarian Creek, and other small creeks. The Marmaton River rises east of the center of the county, and flows through the southeastern part of the county. The Little Osage River rises not far from the head of the Marmaton and flows northeast. Its tributaries are Middle Creek on the north and the South Fork on the south.

=== Adjacent counties ===
- Anderson County (north)
- Linn County (northeast)
- Bourbon County (east)
- Neosho County (south)
- Wilson County (southwest)
- Woodson County (west)
- Coffey County (northwest)

== Demographics ==
Historical population
Census	Pop.	Note	%±
1860	3,082		—
1870	7,022		127.8%
1880	11,303		61.0%
1890	13,509		19.5%
1900	19,507		44.4%
1910	27,640		41.7%
1920	23,509		−14.9%
1930	21,391		−9.0%
1940	19,874		−7.1%
1950	18,187		−8.5%
1960	16,369		−10.0%
1970	15,043		−8.1%
1980	15,654		4.1%
1990	14,638		−6.5%
2000	14,385		−1.7%
2010	13,371		−7.0%
2020	12,526		−6.3%
2025 (est.)	12,302	▼	−1.8%
U.S. Decennial Census; 1790-1960 1900-1990; 1990-2000 2010-2020

=== 2020 census ===
As of the 2020 census, the county had a population of 12,526. The median age was 41.8 years. 21.9% of residents were under the age of 18 and 21.4% of residents were 65 years of age or older. For every 100 females there were 97.1 males, and for every 100 females age 18 and over there were 95.2 males age 18 and over. 46.7% of residents lived in urban areas, while 53.3% lived in rural areas.

The racial makeup of the county was 89.3% White, 1.5% Black or African American, 1.2% American Indian and Alaska Native, 0.5% Asian, 0.0% Native Hawaiian and Pacific Islander, 1.3% from some other race, and 6.2% from two or more races. Hispanic or Latino residents of any race comprised 4.0% of the population.

There were 5,273 households in the county, of which 27.3% had children under the age of 18 living with them and 26.7% had a female householder with no spouse or partner present. About 32.4% of all households were made up of individuals and 15.6% had someone living alone who was 65 years of age or older.

There were 6,054 housing units, of which 12.9% were vacant. Among occupied housing units, 69.6% were owner-occupied and 30.4% were renter-occupied. The homeowner vacancy rate was 1.9% and the rental vacancy rate was 11.2%.

=== Census 2010 ===
As of the 2010 United States census, there were 13,371 people living in the county. 93.3% were White, 1.9% Black or African American, 0.8% Native American, 0.5% Asian, 1.0% of some other race and 2.5% of two or more races. 2.9% were Hispanic or Latino (of any race). 31.7% were of German, 12.4% American, 11.1% Irish and 7.9% English ancestry.

=== Census 2000 ===
As of the 2000 census, there were 14,385 people, 5,775 households, and 3,892 families residing in Allen County. The population density was 29 people per square mile (11 people/km^{2}). There were 6,449 housing units at an average density of 13 units per square mile (5.0 units/km^{2}). The racial makeup of the county was 94.80% White, 1.63% Black or African American, 0.78% Native American, 0.26% Asian, 0.86% from other races, and 1.68% from two or more races. Hispanic or Latino of any race were 1.93% of the population. 28.8% were of German, 20.3% American, 9.8% English and 8.6% Irish ancestry.

There were 5,775 households, out of which 29.80% had children under the age of 18 living with them, 54.60% were married couples living together, 8.90% had a female householder with no husband present, and 32.60% were non-families. 28.50% of all households were made up of individuals, and 14.40% had someone living alone who was 65 years of age or older. The average household size was 2.43 and the average family size was 2.98.

In the county, the population was spread out, with 25.20% under the age of 18, 9.80% from 18 to 24, 24.10% from 25 to 44, 22.90% from 45 to 64, and 18.00% who were 65 years of age or older. The median age was 39 years. For every 100 females there were 95.60 males. For every 100 females age 18 and over, there were 90.70 males.

The median income for a household in the county was $31,481, and the median income for a family was $39,117. Males had a median income of $27,305 versus $19,221 for females. The per capita income for the county was $15,640. About 11.30% of families and 14.90% of the population were below the poverty line, including 20.20% of those under age 18 and 12.70% of those age 65 or over.

=== Historical trends ===
During the years of the American Civil War the county continued to develop though at a slower rate. From 1860 to 1870 there was a steady increase in population from 3,082 to 7,022 residents. The next ten years brought a similar steady rise, from 7,022 to 11,303 residents. The county's largest growth period was between 1890 and 1910. At its peak in 1910, Allen County had 27,640 residents. Thereafter the county experienced a slow decline in population. By 2010, the population was slightly below the population in 1890 there being 13,371 residents. The population increase during the 1890/1910 period was likely due to the oil and gas discoveries and production near Iola.

== Government ==
=== Presidential elections ===
Allen County is a Republican stronghold. The last Democrat to carry this county was Lyndon B. Johnson in 1964, although Bill Clinton came within just 39 votes of carrying it in 1992.

Presidential election results

United States presidential election results for Allen County, Kansas
Year	Republican		Democratic		Third party(ies)	
Year	No.	%	No.	%	No.	%
1888	1,886	56.62%	1,036	31.10%	409	12.28%
1892	1,509	51.20%	0	0.00%	1,438	48.80%
1896	1,833	51.60%	1,656	46.62%	63	1.77%
1900	2,680	55.57%	2,073	42.98%	70	1.45%
1904	3,754	68.06%	1,380	25.02%	382	6.93%
1908	3,283	53.80%	2,579	42.26%	240	3.93%
1912	1,692	35.07%	1,739	36.04%	1,394	28.89%
1916	4,129	47.78%	4,053	46.90%	459	5.31%
1920	5,091	67.68%	2,272	30.20%	159	2.11%
1924	6,101	69.94%	2,181	25.00%	441	5.06%
1928	6,695	78.30%	1,803	21.09%	52	0.61%
1932	4,510	50.47%	4,249	47.55%	177	1.98%
1936	6,071	61.05%	3,869	38.90%	5	0.05%
1940	6,376	66.42%	3,178	33.10%	46	0.48%
1944	5,032	68.56%	2,262	30.82%	46	0.63%
1948	4,704	61.21%	2,891	37.62%	90	1.17%
1952	6,045	73.40%	2,160	26.23%	31	0.38%
1956	5,342	71.15%	2,143	28.54%	23	0.31%
1960	4,947	65.89%	2,540	33.83%	21	0.28%
1964	2,841	45.44%	3,369	53.89%	42	0.67%
1968	3,520	59.66%	1,875	31.78%	505	8.56%
1972	3,938	69.47%	1,610	28.40%	121	2.13%
1976	3,269	53.23%	2,746	44.72%	126	2.05%
1980	3,811	60.33%	2,009	31.80%	497	7.87%
1984	4,267	69.76%	1,778	29.07%	72	1.18%
1988	3,429	58.14%	2,392	40.56%	77	1.31%
1992	2,351	36.56%	2,312	35.96%	1,767	27.48%
1996	2,797	47.06%	2,299	38.68%	847	14.25%
2000	3,379	58.60%	2,132	36.98%	255	4.42%
2004	3,867	65.84%	1,922	32.73%	84	1.43%
2008	3,552	60.67%	2,189	37.39%	114	1.95%
2012	3,316	62.45%	1,869	35.20%	125	2.35%
2016	3,651	66.94%	1,433	26.27%	370	6.78%
2020	4,218	71.59%	1,570	26.65%	104	1.77%
2024	4,029	71.95%	1,445	25.80%	126	2.25%

=== Laws ===
Following amendment to the Kansas Constitution in 1986, the county remained a prohibition, or "dry", county until 2000, when voters approved the sale of alcoholic liquor by the individual drink with a 30% food sales requirement.

== Education ==
=== Unified school districts ===
- Marmaton Valley USD 256
- Iola USD 257
- Humboldt USD 258

=== Colleges and universities ===
- Allen County Community College

== Transportation ==
=== Major highways ===
U.S. Route 54 is an east–west route passing through (from east to west) the cities of Moran, La Harpe, Gas, and Iola (the county seat). Outside the county the route connects to Fort Scott in the east and Yates Center and eventually Wichita in the west. Passing through eastern portions of the county and the communities of Mildred and Moran, U.S. Route 59 is one of two north–south routes. It connects to Kincaid and eventually Ottawa and Lawrence in the north and Erie in the south. The other route is U.S. Route 169 which passes through western portions of the county and bypasses to the east of the cities of Iola, Bassett, and Humboldt. It connects to Chanute and eventually Coffeyville in the south. The segment between Iola and Chanute is a freeway with fully controlled access, although there is only one lane in each direction. US-169 provides a direct route for traveling between Kansas City and Tulsa, Oklahoma.

=== Bus ===
- Jefferson Lines

=== Airports ===
- Allen County Airport (K88), public
- Croisant Airport (7KS5), private
- Ensminger Airport (74KS), private
- National Airport, public
- Womack Airport, public

== Communities ==
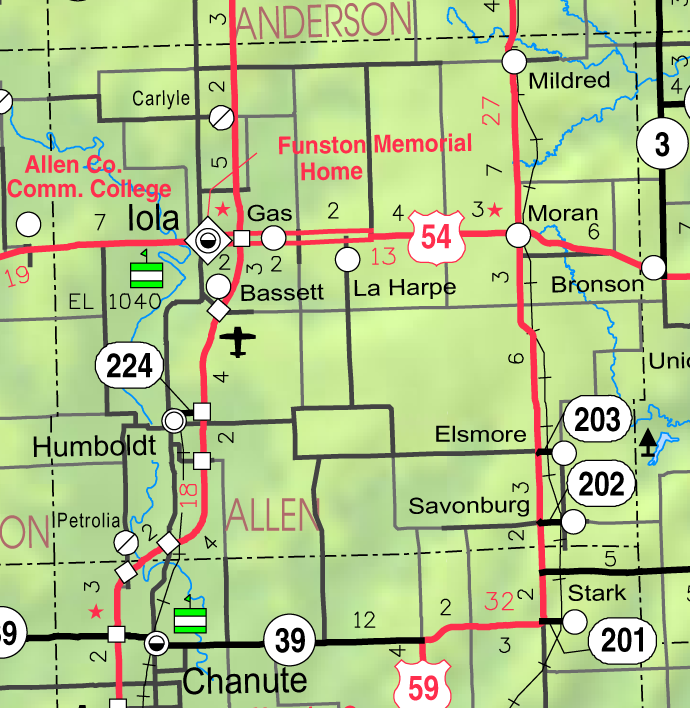
2005 map of Allen County (map legend)

List of townships / incorporated cities / unincorporated communities / extinct former communities within Allen County.

=== Cities ===
- Bassett
- Elsmore
- Gas
- Humboldt
- Iola (county seat)
- La Harpe
- Moran
- Savonburg

=== Unincorporated communities ===
‡ means a community has portions in an adjacent county. † means a community is designated a Census-Designated Place (CDP) by the United States Census Bureau.

- Bayard
- Carlyle
- Geneva
- Leanna‡
- Mildred†
- Petrolia

=== Ghost towns ===
- Cofachique
- Octagon City

=== Townships ===
Allen County is divided into twelve townships. Because Humboldt, Iola, and La Harpe are cities of the second class, they are governmentally independent from the townships and are excluded from the census figures for the townships. In the following table, the population center is the largest city (or cities) included in that township's population total, if it is of a significant size.

Township	FIPS	Population center	Population	Population density /km^{2} (/sq mi)	Land area km^{2} (sq mi)	Water area km^{2} (sq mi)	Water %	Geographic coordinates
Carlyle	10725		276	4 (9)	78 (30)	0 (0)	0.09%	37°59′50″N 95°22′47″W
Cottage Grove	15825		282	3 (8)	96 (37)	0 (0)	0.42%	37°45′20″N 95°22′11″W
Deer Creek	17175		142	2 (4)	94 (36)	0 (0)	0.13%	37°59′14″N 95°17′23″W
Elm	20550	Gas	1,259	10 (27)	123 (47)	0 (0)	0.33%	37°54′36″N 95°19′36″W
Elsmore	20900		460	3 (7)	165 (64)	0 (0)	0.06%	37°47′1″N 95°9′23″W
Geneva	26100		172	2 (6)	78 (30)	1 (0)	1.02%	38°0′7″N 95°28′33″W
Humboldt	33475		273	4 (11)	65 (25)	1 (0)	0.88%	37°48′47″N 95°25′34″W
Iola	34325		843	8 (19)	112 (43)	2 (1)	1.57%	37°54′29″N 95°25′27″W
Logan	41725		225	3 (7)	83 (32)	1 (0)	0.75%	37°47′2″N 95°29′2″W
Marmaton	44850	Moran	853	6 (15)	144 (56)	0 (0)	0.09%	37°54′40″N 95°9′48″W
Osage	53075		316	3 (7)	124 (48)	0 (0)	0.37%	38°0′14″N 95°9′36″W
Salem	62600		277	2 (6)	124 (48)	0 (0)	0.10%	37°49′31″N 95°18′6″W
Sources: "Census 2000 U.S. Gazetteer Files". U.S. Census Bureau, Geography Division. Archived from the original on August 2, 2002.

== See also ==
Community information for Kansas

- Kansas locations by per capita income
- List of counties in Kansas
- List of townships in Kansas
- List of cities in Kansas
- List of unincorporated communities in Kansas
- List of ghost towns in Kansas
