= La Harpe, Kansas =

City in Allen County, Kansas

- City
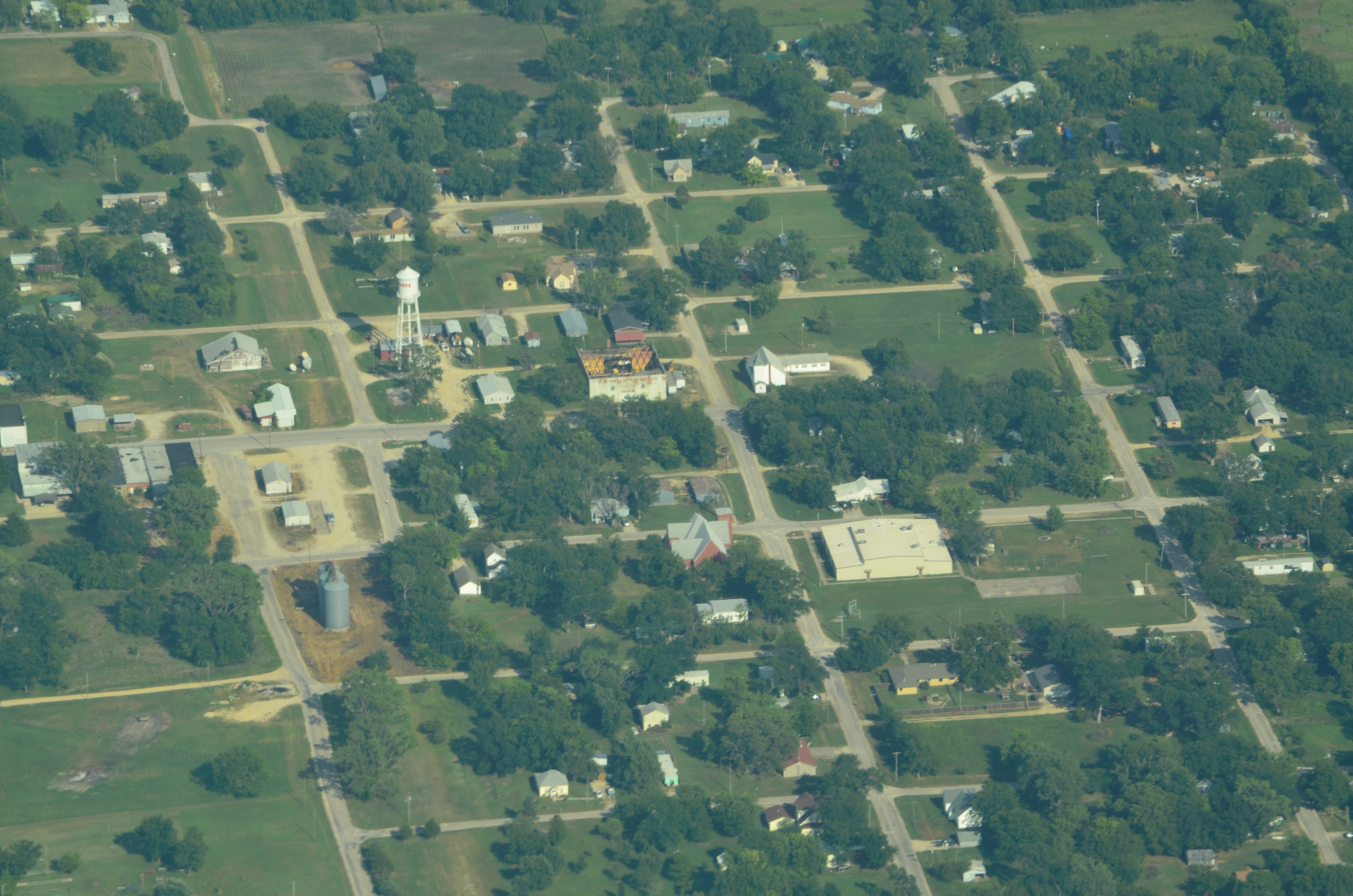
- Aerial View of La Harpe (2013)

- Location within Allen County and Kansas

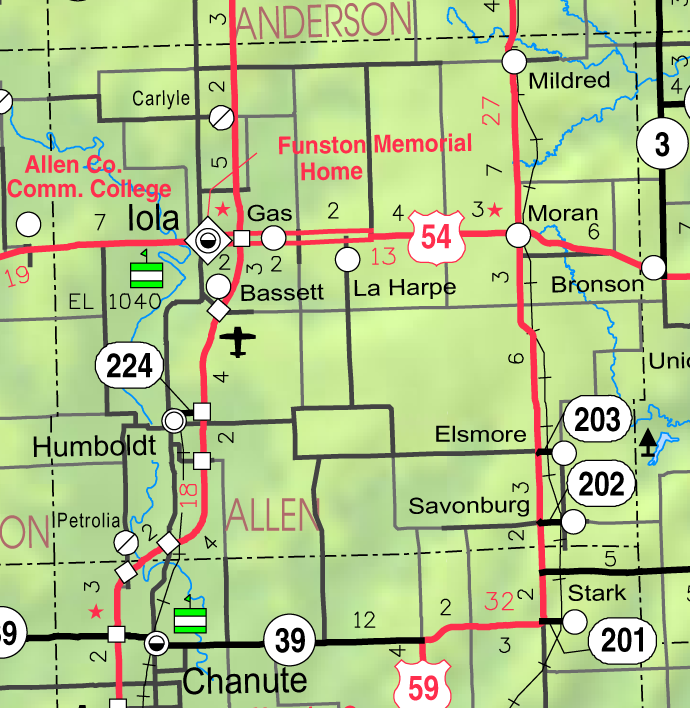
- KDOT map of Allen County (legend)
- Coordinates: 37°55′00″N 95°18′08″W
- Country: United States
- State: Kansas
- County: Allen
- Founded: 1881
- Platted: 1881
- Incorporated: 1905
- Named for: La Harpe, Illinois

Area
  - Total: 0.80 sq mi (2.08 km^{2})
  - Land: 0.80 sq mi (2.08 km^{2})
  - Water: 0 sq mi (0.00 km^{2})
- Elevation: 1,030 ft (310 m)

Population (2020)
  - Total: 480
  - Density: 600/sq mi (230/km^{2})
- Time zone: UTC-6 (CST)
  - Summer (DST): UTC-5 (CDT)
- ZIP Code: 66751
- Area code: 620
- FIPS code: 20-37725
- GNIS ID: 485604
- Website: cityoflaharpe.org

La Harpe is a city in Allen County, Kansas, United States. As of the 2020 census, the population of the city was 480.

== History ==
La Harpe was founded by the Fort Scott, Wichita & Western Railroad company (later the Missouri Pacific), and was platted in 1881. It was named after La Harpe, Illinois and they both commemorate a prominent French explorer of the southern Great Plains of North America, Bernard de la Harpe

When natural gas was discovered in the immediate vicinity in 1899 the city began to grow more rapidly and soon rose to be a city of importance. It was incorporated as a city of the second class, and in 1910 had some of the largest zinc smelters in the world, two banks, an opera house, several good mercantile establishments, a newspaper, and all the municipal improvements usually found in cities of that class. The population that year was 2,080. Its post office, first opened in November 1881, was authorized to issue international money orders, and two rural routes supplied mail to the surrounding country.

== Geography ==
La Harpe is situated along U.S. Route 54 in the central part of Allen County, La Harpe is about 5 1/2 miles east of the city of Iola (the county seat), 2 1/2 miles east of Gas, and about seven miles west of the junction of U.S. Routes 54 and 59 and the city of Moran.

According to the United States Census Bureau, the city has a total area of 0.82 square miles (2.12 km^{2}), all of it land.

== Demographics ==
Historical population
Census	Pop.	Note	%±
1900	610		—
1910	2,080		241.0%
1920	1,001		−51.9%
1930	756		−24.5%
1940	624		−17.5%
1950	511		−18.1%
1960	529		3.5%
1970	509		−3.8%
1980	687		35.0%
1990	650		−5.4%
2000	706		8.6%
2010	578		−18.1%
2020	480		−17.0%
U.S. Decennial Census

=== 2020 census ===
The 2020 United States census counted 480 people, 207 households, and 133 families in La Harpe. The population density was 602.3 per square mile (232.5/km^{2}). There were 234 housing units at an average density of 293.6 per square mile (113.4/km^{2}). The racial makeup was 92.71% (445) white or European American (91.88% non-Hispanic white), 0.21% (1) black or African-American, 1.88% (9) Native American or Alaska Native, 0.42% (2) Asian, 0.0% (0) Pacific Islander or Native Hawaiian, 0.42% (2) from other races, and 4.38% (21) from two or more races. Hispanic or Latino of any race was 2.29% (11) of the population.

Of the 207 households, 28.5% had children under the age of 18; 47.3% were married couples living together; 17.9% had a female householder with no spouse or partner present. 29.5% of households consisted of individuals and 8.7% had someone living alone who was 65 years of age or older. The average household size was 2.5 and the average family size was 2.9. The percent of those with a bachelor's degree or higher was estimated to be 5.6% of the population.

19.8% of the population was under the age of 18, 8.8% from 18 to 24, 21.9% from 25 to 44, 30.2% from 45 to 64, and 19.4% who were 65 years of age or older. The median age was 44.7 years. For every 100 females, there were 103.4 males. For every 100 females ages 18 and older, there were 96.4 males.

The 2016–2020 5-year American Community Survey estimates show that the median household income was $34,583 (with a margin of error of +/- $4,323) and the median family income was $43,125 (+/- $18,550). Males had a median income of $27,292 (+/- $7,377) versus $17,130 (+/- $3,177) for females. The median income for those above 16 years old was $21,797 (+/- $5,632). Approximately, 10.1% of families and 12.5% of the population were below the poverty line, including 20.5% of those under the age of 18 and 8.9% of those ages 65 or over.

=== 2010 census ===
As of the census of 2010, there were 578 people, 234 households, and 161 families residing in the city. The population density was 704.9 inhabitants per square mile (272.2/km^{2}). There were 273 housing units at an average density of 332.9 per square mile (128.5/km^{2}). The racial makeup of the city was 93.6% White, 1.4% African American, 1.2% Native American, 0.9% Asian, 1.0% from other races, and 1.9% from two or more races. Hispanic or Latino of any race were 1.6% of the population.

There were 234 households, of which 28.6% had children under the age of 18 living with them, 49.6% were married couples living together, 12.0% had a female householder with no husband present, 7.3% had a male householder with no wife present, and 31.2% were non-families. 26.1% of all households were made up of individuals, and 12% had someone living alone who was 65 years of age or older. The average household size was 2.47 and the average family size was 2.91.

The median age in the city was 42.2 years. 22.3% of residents were under the age of 18; 9% were between the ages of 18 and 24; 24.1% were from 25 to 44; 27.9% were from 45 to 64; and 16.8% were 65 years of age or older. The gender makeup of the city was 52.1% male and 47.9% female.

=== 2000 census ===
As of the census of 2000, there were 706 people, 268 households, and 191 families residing in the city. The population density was 819.4 inhabitants per square mile (316.4/km^{2}). There were 298 housing units at an average density of 345.9 per square mile (133.6/km^{2}). The racial makeup of the city was 93.77% White, 0.99% African American, 2.12% Native American, and 3.12% from two or more races. Hispanic or Latino of any race were 0.85% of the population.

There were 268 households, out of which 35.8% had children under the age of 18 living with them, 57.1% were married couples living together, 9.7% had a female householder with no husband present, and 28.4% were non-families. 23.5% of all households were made up of individuals, and 11.2% had someone living alone who was 65 years of age or older. The average household size was 2.63 and the average family size was 3.08.

In the city, the population was spread out, with 28.6% under the age of 18, 9.8% from 18 to 24, 29.6% from 25 to 44, 21.4% from 45 to 64, and 10.6% who were 65 years of age or older. The median age was 34 years. For every 100 females, there were 103.5 males. For every 100 females age 18 and over, there were 100.8 males.

The median income for a household in the city was $24,219, and the median income for a family was $32,981. Males had a median income of $22,102 versus $16,058 for females. The per capita income for the city was $12,196. About 8.9% of families and 13.4% of the population were below the poverty line, including 16.1% of those under age 18 and 11.8% of those age 65 or over.

== Education ==
La Harpe is a part of USD 257 Iola. The Iola High School mascot is Mustangs.

La Harpe schools were closed through school unification. The La Harpe High School mascot was La Harpe Panthers.

== Transportation ==
The nearest intercity bus stop is located in Gas. Service is provided by Jefferson Lines on a route from Minneapolis to Tulsa.

== Notable people ==
- Ad Brennan, baseball player
