= Logan Township, Allen County, Kansas =

Logan Township
- Township
- Location in Allen County
- Coordinates: 37°48′20″N 095°29′56″W
- Country: United States
- State: Kansas
- County: Allen

Area
  - Total: 32.4 sq mi (84.0 km^{2})
  - Land: 32.0 sq mi (82.8 km^{2})
  - Water: 0.46 sq mi (1.2 km^{2}) 1.4%
- Elevation: 932 ft (284 m)

Population (2010)
  - Total: 219
  - Density: 6.7/sq mi (2.6/km^{2})
- GNIS feature ID: 0474708

Logan Township is one of twelve townships in Allen County, Kansas, United States. As of the 2010 census, its population was 219.

== Geography ==
Logan Township covers an area of 32.4 square miles (84.0 km^{2}) and contains one unincorporated settlement: Petrolia.

According to the USGS, it contains two cemeteries: Dewitt and Ellison.

The streams of Bloody Run, Mud Creek, Onion Creek, Owl Creek and Scatter Creek run through this township.
