= Mildred, Kansas =

Unincorporated community in Allen County, Kansas

- CDP
- Location within Allen County and Kansas

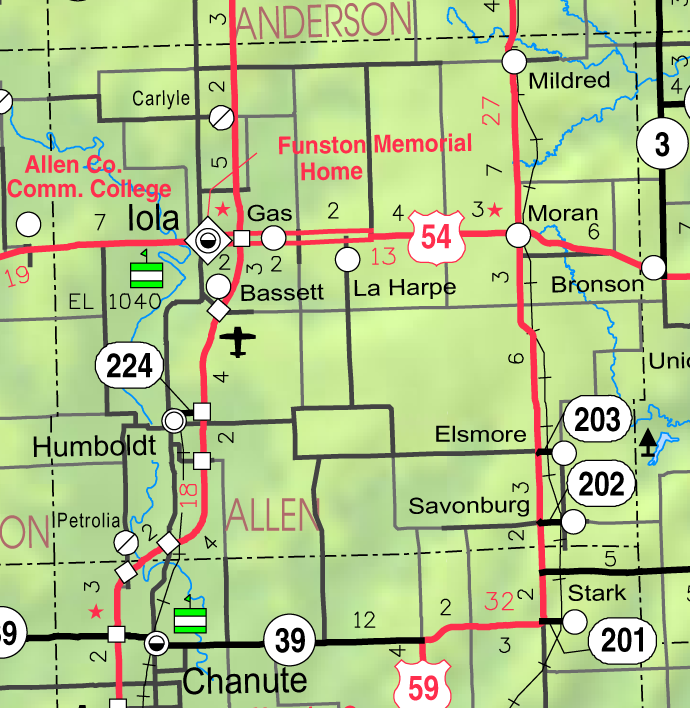
- KDOT map of Allen County (legend)
- Coordinates: 38°01′25″N 95°10′18″W
- Country: United States
- State: Kansas
- County: Allen
- Founded: 1907
- Named for: Mildred Wagner

Area
  - Total: 0.21 sq mi (0.54 km^{2})
  - Land: 0.21 sq mi (0.54 km^{2})
  - Water: 0 sq mi (0 km^{2})
- Elevation: 1,063 ft (324 m)

Population (2020)
  - Total: 25
  - Density: 120/sq mi (46/km^{2})
- Time zone: UTC-6 (CST)
  - Summer (DST): UTC-5 (CDT)
- Area code: 620
- FIPS code: 20-46500
- GNIS ID: 2804709

Mildred a census-designated place (CDP) in Osage Township, Allen County, Kansas, United States. As of the 2020 census, the population was 25. It is located along US 59 highway about 7 miles (11.3 km) north of Moran and 4 miles (6.4 km) south of Kincaid.

== History ==
Mildred was founded in 1907 by Sam Dermott for the Great Western Cement Company. The community was named for the daughter of J. W. Wagner a local industrialist, and the president of the cement company. Cement was shipped all over the world, and cement from the plant was used to construct the Liberty Memorial and World War I museum in Kansas City, Missouri. At its peak the cement plant employed 375, but the community lost most of its population when the plant closed.

The community was previously served by the Missouri–Kansas–Texas Railroad, which maintained a passenger depot in the community, as well as spur lines that served the cement plant and the grain elevator.

Mildred had a Post Office from 1907 to 1973, and was a city until it disincorporated in 2016.

== Geography ==
Mildred is located at 38°1′22″N 95°10′25″W (38.022777, -95.173512). According to the United States Census Bureau, the community has a total area of 0.21 square miles (0.54 km^{2}), all of it land.

== Demographics ==
Historical population
Census	Pop.	Note	%±
1920	336		—
1930	341		1.5%
1940	155		−54.5%
1950	79		−49.0%
1960	60		−24.1%
1970	42		−30.0%
1980	64		52.4%
1990	46		−28.1%
2000	36		−21.7%
2010	28		−22.2%
2020	25		−10.7%
U.S. Decennial Census

=== 2020 census ===
The 2020 United States census counted 25 people, 6 households, and 4 families in Mildred. The population density was 36.7 per square mile (14.2/km^{2}). There were 16 housing units at an average density of 23.5 per square mile (9.1/km^{2}). The racial makeup was 92.0% (23) white or European American (92.0% non-Hispanic white), 0.0% (0) black or African-American, 0.0% (0) Native American or Alaska Native, 0.0% (0) Asian, 0.0% (0) Pacific Islander or Native Hawaiian, 0.0% (0) from other races, and 8.0% (2) from two or more races. Hispanic or Latino of any race was 0.0% (0) of the population.

Of the 6 households, 50.0% had children under the age of 18; 66.7% were married couples living together; 0.0% had a female householder with no spouse or partner present. 33.3% of households consisted of individuals and 33.3% had someone living alone who was 65 years of age or older. The average household size was 2.3 and the average family size was 3.4.

20.0% of the population was under the age of 18, 0.0% from 18 to 24, 40.0% from 25 to 44, 20.0% from 45 to 64, and 20.0% who were 65 years of age or older. The median age was 33.8 years. For every 100 females, there were 47.1 males. For every 100 females ages 18 and older, there were 33.3 males.

=== 2010 census ===
As of the census of 2010, there were 28 people, 14 households, and 6 families residing in the community. The population density was 133.3 inhabitants per square mile (51.5/km^{2}). There were 21 housing units at an average density of 100.0 per square mile (38.6/km^{2}). The racial makeup of the community was 82.1% White, 10.7% African American, and 7.1% Native American. Hispanic or Latino of any race were 7.1% of the population.

There were 14 households, of which 28.6% had children under the age of 18 living with them, 35.7% were married couples living together, 7.1% had a male householder with no wife present, and 57.1% were non-families. 57.1% of all households were made up of individuals, and 21.4% had someone living alone who was 65 years of age or older. The average household size was 2.00 and the average family size was 3.33.

The median age in the community was 46 years. 25% of residents were under the age of 18; 3.4% were between the ages of 18 and 24; 14.3% were from 25 to 44; 39.3% were from 45 to 64; and 17.9% were 65 years of age or older. The gender makeup of the community was 57.1% male and 42.9% female.

== Education ==
The community is served by the Marmaton Valley USD 256 public school district, and all students attend schools in the city of Moran.

The former Mildred High School closed after the 1944 school year.

== Transportation ==
The nearest intercity bus stop is located in the city of Gas. Service is provided by Jefferson Lines on a route from Minneapolis to Tulsa.
