= Salem Township, Allen County, Kansas =

Salem Township
- Township
- Location in Allen County
- Coordinates: 37°47′45″N 095°22′36″W
- Country: United States
- State: Kansas
- County: Allen

Area
  - Total: 48.0 sq mi (124.3 km^{2})
  - Land: 47.6 sq mi (123.4 km^{2})
  - Water: 0.39 sq mi (1.0 km^{2}) 0.8%
- Elevation: 994 ft (303 m)

Population (2010)
  - Total: 249
  - Density: 5.2/sq mi (2/km^{2})
- GNIS feature ID: 0474746

Salem Township is one of twelve townships in Allen County, Kansas, United States. As of the 2010 census, its population was 249. More recent estimates place the population at approximately 249 as of 2026.

== Geography ==
Salem Township covers an area of 48.0 square miles (124.3 km^{2}) and contains no incorporated settlements. According to the USGS, it contains two cemeteries: Maple Grove and Salem.

== Transportation ==
Salem Township contains one airport or landing strip, Croisant Airport.
