= Elsmore Township, Kansas =

Elsmore Township
- Township
- Location in Allen County
- Coordinates: 37°47′30″N 095°09′08″W
- Country: United States
- State: Kansas
- County: Allen

Area
  - Total: 63.8 sq mi (165.3 km^{2})
  - Land: 63.6 sq mi (164.6 km^{2})
  - Water: 0.31 sq mi (0.8 km^{2}) 0.45%
- Elevation: 1,050 ft (320 m)

Population (2010)
  - Total: 414
  - Density: 6.5/sq mi (2.5/km^{2})
- GNIS feature ID: 0474741

Elsmore Township is one of twelve townships in Allen County, Kansas, United States. As of the 2010 census, its population was 414.

== Geography ==
Elsmore Township covers an area of 63.8 square miles (165.3 km^{2}) and contains two incorporated settlements: Elsmore and Savonburg. According to the USGS, it contains four cemeteries: Elsmore, Friends Home, Harmony and Old Elsmore.

The streams of Jackie Branch Marmaton River, Little Creek and Mud Creek run through this township.
