= Deer Creek Township, Allen County, Kansas =

Deer Creek Township
- Township
- Location in Allen County
- Coordinates: 37°59′40″N 095°16′51″W
- Country: United States
- State: Kansas
- County: Allen

Area
  - Total: 36.2 sq mi (93.7 km^{2})
  - Land: 35.9 sq mi (93.1 km^{2})
  - Water: 0.23 sq mi (0.6 km^{2}) 0.7%
- Elevation: 1,027 ft (313 m)

Population (2010)
  - Total: 129
  - Density: 3.6/sq mi (1.4/km^{2})
- GNIS feature ID: 0478126

Deer Creek Township is one of twelve townships in Allen County, Kansas, United States. As of the 2010 census, its population was 129.

== Geography ==
Deer Creek Township covers an area of 36.2 square miles (93.7 km^{2}) and contains no incorporated settlements. According to the USGS, it contains one cemetery, Pleasant Valley.
