= Iola Township, Kansas =

Iola Township
- Township
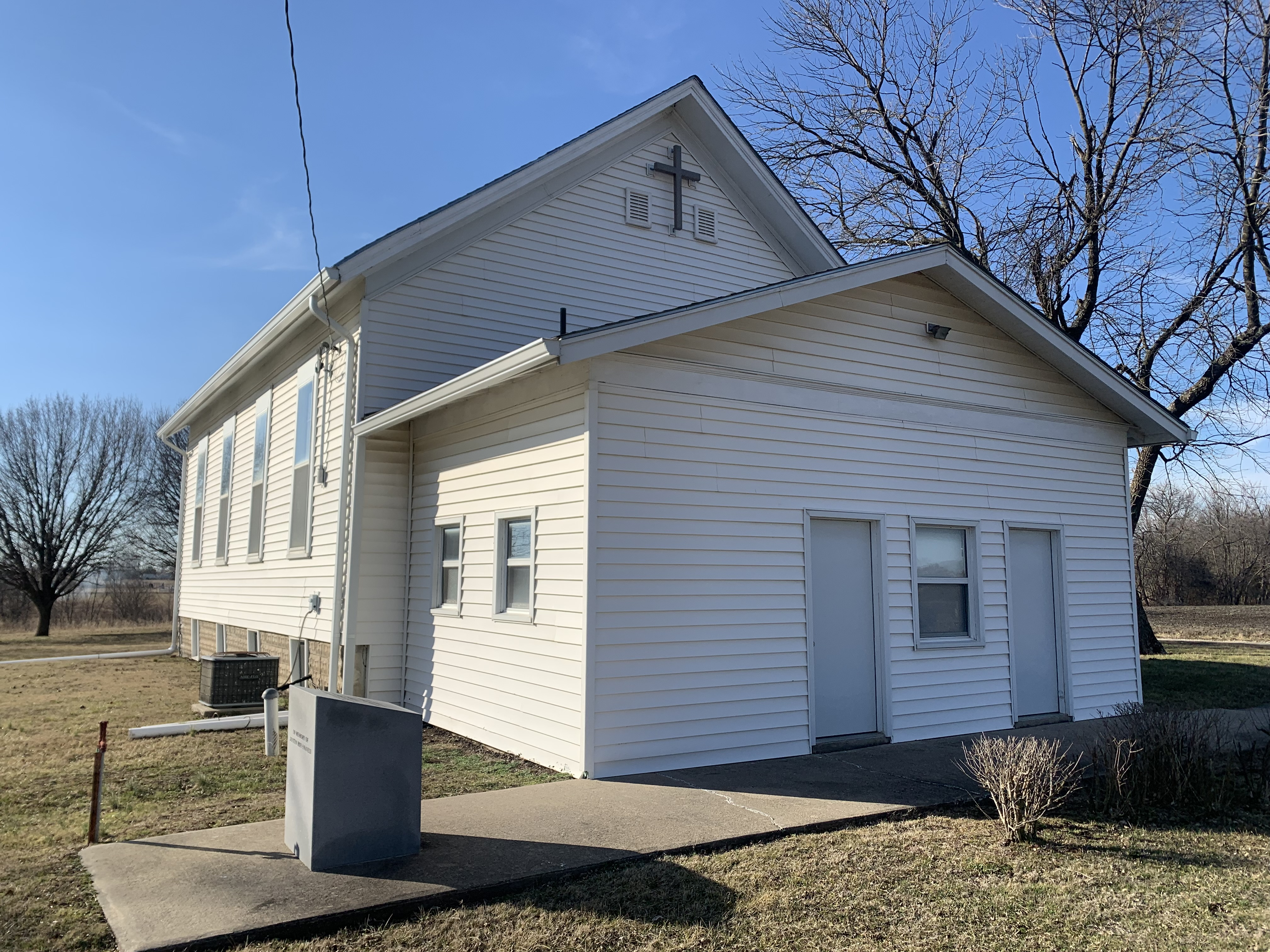
- Salem United Methodist Church (2026)

- Location in Allen County
- Coordinates: 37°54′28″N 095°26′46″W
- Country: United States
- State: Kansas
- County: Allen

Area
  - Total: 43.5 sq mi (112.7 km^{2})
  - Land: 42.7 sq mi (110.6 km^{2})
  - Water: 0.77 sq mi (2.0 km^{2}) 1.8%
- Elevation: 958 ft (292 m)

Population (2010)
  - Total: 830
  - Density: 19/sq mi (7.5/km^{2})
- GNIS ID: 0474513

Iola Township is one of twelve townships in Allen County, Kansas, United States. As of the 2010 census, its population was 830.

== Geography ==
Iola Township covers an area of 43.5 square miles (112.7 km^{2}) and contains two incorporated settlements: Bassett and Iola (the county seat). According to the USGS, it contains three cemeteries: Highland, Iola and Iola.

The streams of Coon Creek, Deer Creek, Elm Creek and Rock Creek run through this township.

== Transportation ==
Iola Township contains three airports or landing strips: Allen County Airport, Allen County Hospital Airport and Womack Airport.
