= Marmaton Township, Allen County, Kansas =

Marmaton Township
- Township
- Location in Allen County
- Coordinates: 37°54′25″N 095°09′36″W
- Country: United States
- State: Kansas
- County: Allen

Area
  - Total: 55.8 sq mi (144.6 km^{2})
  - Land: 55.6 sq mi (143.9 km^{2})
  - Water: 0.27 sq mi (0.7 km^{2}) 0.5%
- Elevation: 1,099 ft (335 m)

Population (2010)
  - Total: 877
  - Density: 16/sq mi (6.1/km^{2})
- GNIS feature ID: 0474522

Marmaton Township is one of twelve townships in Allen County, Kansas, United States. As of the 2010 census, its population was 877. The majority of inhabitants are farmers.

== Geography ==
Marmaton Township covers an area of 55.8 square miles (144.6 km^{2}) and contains one incorporated settlement, Moran. According to the USGS, it contains one cemetery, Moran.

The stream of Sweet Branch runs through this township.
