= Savonburg, Kansas =

City in Allen County, Kansas

- City
- Location within Allen County and Kansas

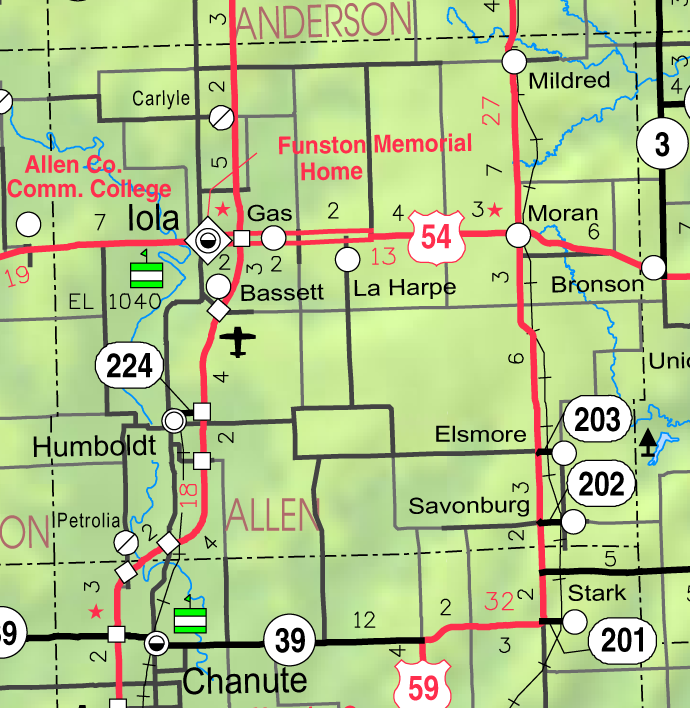
- KDOT map of Allen County (legend)
- Coordinates: 37°44′56″N 95°08′34″W
- Country: United States
- State: Kansas
- County: Allen
- Township: Elsmore
- Founded: 1879
- Incorporated: 1902

Area
  - Total: 0.19 sq mi (0.50 km^{2})
  - Land: 0.19 sq mi (0.50 km^{2})
  - Water: 0 sq mi (0.00 km^{2})
- Elevation: 1,047 ft (319 m)

Population (2020)
  - Total: 74
  - Density: 380/sq mi (150/km^{2})
- Time zone: UTC-6 (CST)
  - Summer (DST): UTC-5 (CDT)
- ZIP Code: 66772
- Area code: 620
- FIPS code: 20-63200
- GNIS ID: 2396546

Savonburg is a city in Elsmore Township, Allen County, Kansas, United States. As of the 2020 census, the population of the city was 74.

== History ==
Savonburg was founded in 1879. The origin of the name Savonburg is obscure. It was incorporated as a city in 1902. Its high school closed in 1946, then its grade school closed in the 1960s. Many of the settlers of Savonburg were Swedish. In the early days, the city had a Swedish concert band. For much of the 20th century, Savonburg was served by the Missouri–Kansas–Texas Railroad which maintained a passenger depot in the city.

== Geography ==
According to the United States Census Bureau, the city has a total area of 0.20 square miles (0.52 km^{2}), all of it land.

== Demographics ==
Historical population
Census	Pop.	Note	%±
1910	257		—
1920	258		0.4%
1930	230		−10.9%
1940	198		−13.9%
1950	155		−21.7%
1960	131		−15.5%
1970	109		−16.8%
1980	113		3.7%
1990	93		−17.7%
2000	91		−2.2%
2010	109		19.8%
2020	74		−32.1%
U.S. Decennial Census

=== 2010 census ===
As of the census of 2010, there were 109 people, 41 households, and 27 families residing in the city. The population density was 545.0 inhabitants per square mile (210.4/km^{2}). There were 47 housing units at an average density of 235.0 per square mile (90.7/km^{2}). The racial makeup of the city was 89.9% White, 4.6% Native American, and 5.5% from two or more races. Hispanic or Latino of any race were 5.5% of the population.

There were 41 households, of which 46.3% had children under the age of 18 living with them, 43.9% were married couples living together, 4.9% had a female householder with no husband present, 17.1% had a male householder with no wife present, and 34.1% were non-families. 34.1% of all households were made up of individuals, and 14.6% had someone living alone who was 65 years of age or older. The average household size was 2.66 and the average family size was 3.41.

The median age in the city was 31.5 years. 39.4% of residents were under the age of 18; 1.8% were between the ages of 18 and 24; 22% were from 25 to 44; 20.2% were from 45 to 64; and 16.5% were 65 years of age or older. The gender makeup of the city was 55.0% male and 45.0% female.

=== 2000 census ===
As of the census of 2000, there were 91 people, 37 households, and 24 families residing in the city. The population density was 462.6 inhabitants per square mile (178.6/km^{2}). There were 45 housing units at an average density of 228.8 per square mile (88.3/km^{2}). The racial makeup of the city was 92.31% White, 6.59% Native American, and 1.10% from two or more races.

There were 37 households, out of which 24.3% had children under the age of 18 living with them, 51.4% were married couples living together, 5.4% had a female householder with no husband present, and 35.1% were non-families. 32.4% of all households were made up of individuals, and 18.9% had someone living alone who was 65 years of age or older. The average household size was 2.46 and the average family size was 3.04.

In the city, the population was spread out, with 24.2% under the age of 18, 7.7% from 18 to 24, 22.0% from 25 to 44, 28.6% from 45 to 64, and 17.6% who were 65 years of age or older. The median age was 40 years. For every 100 females, there were 85.7 males. For every 100 females age 18 and over, there were 76.9 males.

The median income for a household in the city was $8,750, and the median income for a family was $40,625. Males had a median income of $19,375 versus $21,875 for females. The per capita income for the city was $11,085. There were 23.1% of families and 40.7% of the population living below the poverty line, including 26.7% of under eighteens and 70.0% of those over 64.

== Transportation ==
The nearest intercity bus stop is located in Chanute. Service is provided by Jefferson Lines on a route from Minneapolis to Tulsa.
