= Northrup House (Iola, Kansas) =

Historic house in Kansas, United States

- U.S. National Register of Historic Places
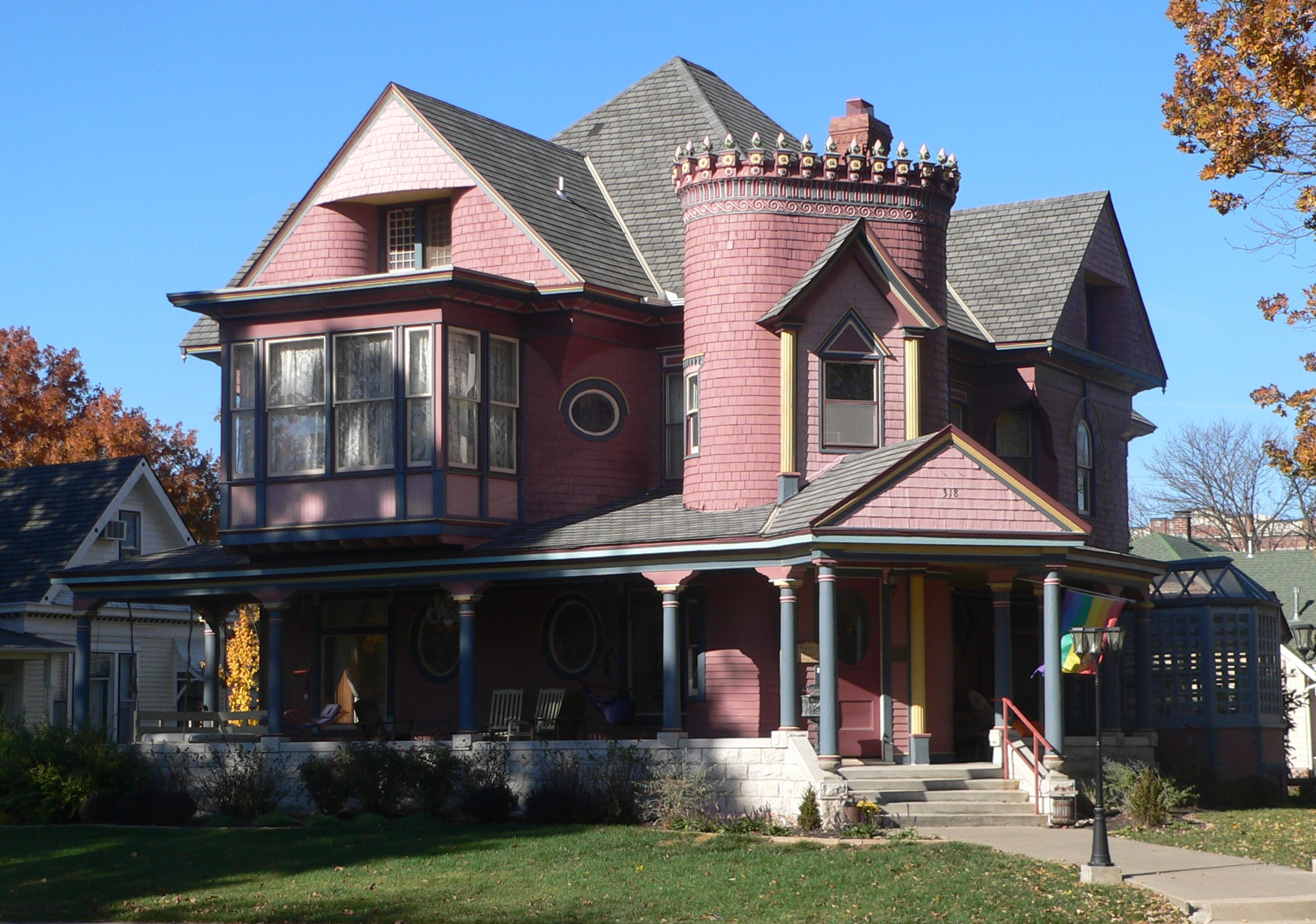
- The Northrup House in 2017

- Location within Kansas Location within the United States
- Location: 318 East St., Iola, Kansas
- Coordinates: 37°55′21″N 95°23′57″W
- Area: Less than one acre
- Built: 1895
- Architectural style: Queen Anne
- NRHP reference No.: 97000395
- Added to NRHP: May 12, 1997

The Northrup House in Iola, Kansas, is a historic Queen Anne-style house built in about 1895. It was listed on the National Register of Historic Places in 1997.

It was originally built as a one-and-a-half-story Queen Anne cottage in 1895 and has been added onto since then. It is now a two-and-one-half-story frame building upon a rusticated limestone and concrete block foundation.

A second contributing building is included in the listing: a single-story, gable-roofed concrete block garage.
