= Geneva Township, Kansas =

Geneva Township, Allen County, Kansas
- Township
- Location in Allen County
- Coordinates: 37°59′40″N 095°27′16″W
- Country: United States
- State: Kansas
- County: Allen

Area
  - Total: 30.2 sq mi (78.2 km^{2})
  - Land: 29.8 sq mi (77.2 km^{2})
  - Water: 0.39 sq mi (1.0 km^{2}) 1.3%
- Elevation: 1,047 ft (319 m)

Population (2010)
  - Total: 119
  - Density: 3.9/sq mi (1.5/km^{2})
- GNIS feature ID: 0478111

Geneva Township is one of twelve townships in Allen County, Kansas, United States. As of the 2010 census, its population was 119.

== Geography ==
Geneva Township covers an area of 30.2 square miles (78.2 km^{2}) and contains no incorporated settlements.

According to the USGS, it contains two cemeteries: Carpenter and Geneva.

The streams of Greaser Creek, Indian Creek, Liberty Creek, Martin Creek and Rock Creek run through this township.
