= Cofachique, Kansas =

Ghost town in Allen County, Kansas

Coordinates: 37.9333°N 95.4148°W

Cofachique (pronounced ko-fa-chee) is a ghost town situated along the Neosho River near the present-day city of Iola in Allen County, Kansas, United States. Being the first town established in Allen County in 1855, it was the original county seat. However, within five years the greater part of the town was moved to the new town of Iola, while the old site of Cofachique became farm land. The town was named in honor of an Osage chief known as Cofachique, who is said to have been particularly helpful to early settlers, bringing aid to the distressed and homeless. The name "Cofachique" appears to have origins with the Cofachiqui (or Cofitachiqui) tribe in South Carolina, who were Siouan speakers, and the Osage who settled this area were closely affiliated with the Siouan.

== History ==
In the spring of 1855 a party of pro-slavery men from Fort Scott formed a town company and laid out a town on the high land east of the Neosho River, south of the mouth of Elm Creek, and about on the north line of Section 10, Township 25 south, Range 18 east. The first Territorial Legislature in July, 1855, passed an act incorporating the Cofachique Town Association. The legislature empowered the Association to locate and hold a tract of land not to exceed nine hundred acres, around the proposed town site, and passed an act making Cofachique the permanent county seat of Allen County. The incorporators were Daniel Woodson, Charles Passmore, James S. Barbee, Samuel A. Williams, and Joseph C. Anderson; Mr. Barbee was elected the first president of the company. During the summer of 1855 the town was located and staked out with Mr. Barbee as the first to settle on the new town site. He was appointed the County Clerk at the first meeting of the county commissioners on May 7, 1856.

For about two years this was the only town in the county, and as a new town was for a time quite successful. Several stores had been opened and Cofachique was known far and near. There was a heavy trade with the neighboring tribes of Indians, and for a time the town had good prospects. The first store was opened by James Galbreath. This was soon followed by another, owned by H.D. Parsons and Mr. Lynn. The next store was opened by Johnson & Owens. In the summer of 1856, Joseph Ledlie, who was engaged in the survey of the standard parallels, brought a sawmill from Westport, Missouri (now a part of Kansas City), and set up in the timber near the town. This mill was run by horse power and was the first manufacturing concern of any kind in the county. During the more prosperous years James Faulkner and Aaron Case were the principal business men.

The first term of the United States District Court was held at Cofachique in 1856, Judge Sterling G. Cato presiding; J.S. Barbee was Clerk, and James Johnson was Sheriff. There is no record of this term of court, and very little was done. The second term of the Court was held at the same place in October, 1858, Judge Williams presiding; J.B. Lambkin was Clerk, and J.E. Morris was Sheriff.

Until the summer of 1857 there was no post office nearer than Fort Scott, and all mail was brought over by a carrier employed by the citizens for the purpose. The first mail route established by the government extended from Fort Scott to Cofachique, and regular mail service began July 1, 1857. The town was established as a post office in the spring of 1857, and Aaron Case was appointed Postmaster.

In 1857 other towns were started and Cofachique began to decline. The founders of Humboldt numbered among them some influential men who, unknown to the citizens of the county, appeared before the free-state Territorial Legislature early in the year 1858, and secured the passage of an act locating the county seat at Humboldt. The following year the greater part of Cofachique was removed about two miles (3 km) north to Iola, that town having just been started. The principal cause of the failure of Cofachique was that, being in a hilly region it was difficult of access, besides which it was almost impossible to obtain good well water. Another reason for its failure was that it was settled by pro-slavery men, generally, and during the early political troubles an armed company of pro-slavery men was stationed there, which caused some anxiety and created a feeling of enmity toward the town. When the towns of Iola and Humboldt were started on either side it was not long until Cofachique became entirely depopulated.

== See also ==
- List of ghost towns in Kansas

== Bibliography ==
- Cutler, William G. (1883). "Allen County". History of the State of Kansas. Chicago, IL: A.T. Andreas. Archived from the original on December 16, 2002. Main source of this town's history.
- Frank W. Blackmar, ed. (1912). "Allen County". Kansas: a cyclopedia of state history, embracing events, institutions, industries, counties, cities, towns, prominent persons, etc ... Vol. I. Chicago: Standard Pub Co. pp. 59–64.
