= Marmaton Valley High School =

Location
- 128 West Oak Street; Moran, Kansas 66755; United States
- Coordinates: 37°55′10″N 95°10′18″W

Information
- School type: Public, High School
- School board: Board Website
- School district: Marmaton Valley USD 256
- CEEB code: 172065
- Principal: Brian Campbell
- Teaching staff: 13.50 (FTE)
- Grades: 7 to 12
- Gender: Coed
- Enrollment: 121 (2023–2024)
- Student to teacher ratio: 8.96
- Campus type: Rural
- Colors: orange black
- Athletics: Class 8 Man I District 2
- Athletics conference: Three Rivers
- Mascot: Wildcats
- Website: marmatonvalley.org

Marmaton Valley High School is a public high school located in Moran, Kansas, United States, serving students in grades 6–12. It is operated by Marmaton Valley USD 256 school district. The current principal is Kim Ensminger. The school colors are orange and black.

== Academics ==
Marmaton Valley serves 193 students in grades 7–12.

== Extracurricular activities ==
Marmaton Valley is a member of the Kansas State High School Activities Association and offers a variety of sports programs. Athletic teams compete in the 1A division and are known as the "Wildcats". Extracurricular activities are also offered in the form of performing arts, school publications, and clubs.

=== Athletics ===
The extracurricular activities offered at Marmaton Valley High School are few and numbered due to the school's small size. The Wildcats compete various sports programs and are classified as a 1A school, the smallest classification in Kansas according to the Kansas State High School Activities Association. Throughout its history, Marmaton Valley has never won a team state championship in any sport, although it has had individual state champions.

== See also ==
- List of high schools in Kansas
- List of unified school districts in Kansas
