= Osage Township, Allen County, Kansas =

Osage Township
- Township
- Location in Allen County
- Coordinates: 37°59′40″N 095°09′06″W
- Country: United States
- State: Kansas
- County: Allen

Area
  - Total: 48.2 sq mi (124.9 km^{2})
  - Land: 47.9 sq mi (124.0 km^{2})
  - Water: 0.35 sq mi (0.9 km^{2}) 0.7%
- Elevation: 1,027 ft (313 m)

Population (2010)
  - Total: 258
  - Density: 5.4/sq mi (2.1/km^{2})
- GNIS feature ID: 0478140

Osage Township is one of twelve townships in Allen County, Kansas, United States. As of the 2010 census, its population was 258.

== Geography ==
Osage Township covers an area of 48.2 square miles (124.9 km^{2}) and contains one incorporated settlement, Mildred. According to the USGS, it contains one cemetery, Osage.

The streams of Coal Creek, Middle Fork Little Osage River and North Fork Little Osage River run through this township.
