= Carlyle Township, Kansas =

Carlyle Township
- Township
- Location in Allen County
- Coordinates: 37°59′42″N 095°22′51″W
- Country: United States
- State: Kansas
- County: Allen

Area
  - Total: 30.0 sq mi (77.7 km^{2})
  - Land: 29.7 sq mi (77.0 km^{2})
  - Water: 0.27 sq mi (0.7 km^{2}) 0.9%
- Elevation: 1,001 ft (305 m)

Population (2010)
  - Total: 285
  - Density: 9.6/sq mi (3.7/km^{2})
- GNIS feature ID: 0478122

Carlyle Township is one of twelve townships in Allen County, Kansas, United States. As of the 2010 census, its population was 285.

== Geography ==
Carlyle Township covers an area of 30.0 square miles (77.7 km^{2}) and contains no incorporated settlements. According to the USGS, it contains two cemeteries: Old Carlyle and Pioneer.

Boyers Lake is within this township. The streams of Carlyle Creek, Cottonwood Creek and Little Deer Creek run through this township.

=== Communities ===
- Carlyle
