= Moran, Kansas =

City in Allen County, Kansas

- City
- Location within Allen County and Kansas

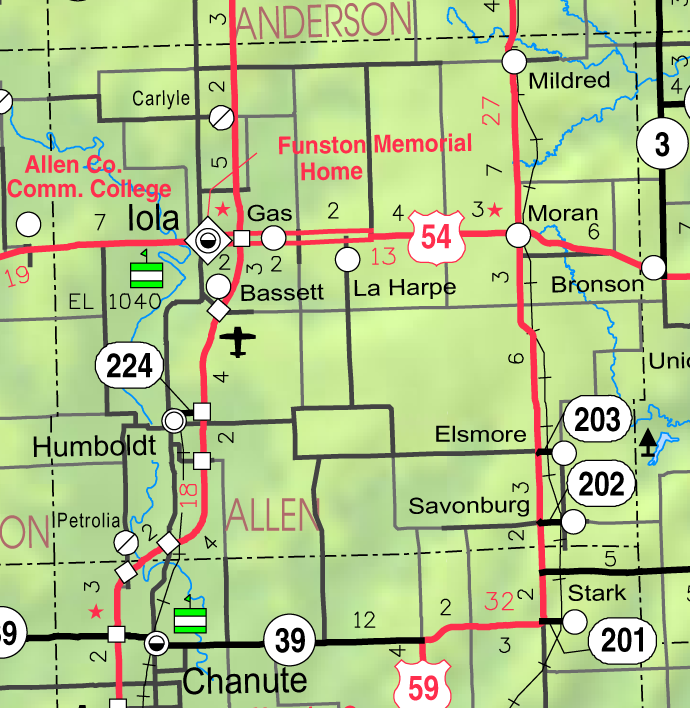
- KDOT map of Allen County (legend)
- Coordinates: 37°55′00″N 95°10′17″W
- Country: United States
- State: Kansas
- County: Allen
- Township: Marmaton
- Founded: 1881
- Platted: 1881
- Incorporated: 1881

Area
  - Total: 0.42 sq mi (1.08 km^{2})
  - Land: 0.42 sq mi (1.08 km^{2})
  - Water: 0 sq mi (0.00 km^{2})
- Elevation: 1,109 ft (338 m)

Population (2020)
  - Total: 466
  - Density: 1,120/sq mi (431/km^{2})
- Time zone: UTC-6 (CST)
  - Summer (DST): UTC-5 (CDT)
- ZIP Code: 66755
- Area code: 620
- FIPS code: 20-48125
- GNIS ID: 2395397
- Website: morancity.org

Moran is a city in Marmaton Township, Allen County, Kansas, United States. As of the 2020 census, the population of the city was 466.

== History ==
Moran had its start in the year 1881 by the building of the Saint Louis, Fort Scott, and Wichita Railroad (later known as the Wichita & Western Division of the Missouri Pacific Railroad) through that territory. The Kansas City Pacific (later known as the Kansas City subdivision of the Missouri-Kansas-Texas Railroad) built through the town. The community was originally called Morantown.

== Geography ==
According to the United States Census Bureau, the city has a total area of 0.42 square miles (1.09 km^{2}), all land.

=== Climate ===
The climate in this area is characterized by hot, humid summers and generally mild to cool winters. According to the Köppen Climate Classification system, Moran has a humid subtropical climate, abbreviated "Cfa" on climate maps.

== Demographics ==
Historical population
Census	Pop.	Note	%±
1890	463		—
1900	464		0.2%
1910	559		20.5%
1920	676		20.9%
1930	651		−3.7%
1940	592		−9.1%
1950	616		4.1%
1960	549		−10.9%
1970	550		0.2%
1980	643		16.9%
1990	551		−14.3%
2000	562		2.0%
2010	558		−0.7%
2020	466		−16.5%
U.S. Decennial Census

=== 2020 census ===
The 2020 United States census counted 466 people, 203 households, and 109 families in Moran. The population density was 1,112.2 per square mile (429.4/km^{2}). There were 230 housing units at an average density of 548.9 per square mile (211.9/km^{2}). The racial makeup was 89.48% (417) white or European American (88.63% non-Hispanic white), 0.43% (2) black or African-American, 1.93% (9) Native American or Alaska Native, 0.43% (2) Asian, 0.21% (1) Pacific Islander or Native Hawaiian, 0.64% (3) from other races, and 6.87% (32) from two or more races. Hispanic or Latino of any race was 2.79% (13) of the population.

Of the 203 households, 26.6% had children under the age of 18; 41.4% were married couples living together; 30.5% had a female householder with no spouse or partner present. 41.9% of households consisted of individuals and 20.7% had someone living alone who was 65 years of age or older. The average household size was 2.2 and the average family size was 2.9. The percent of those with a bachelor's degree or higher was estimated to be 9.7% of the population.

21.9% of the population was under the age of 18, 4.5% from 18 to 24, 20.8% from 25 to 44, 27.7% from 45 to 64, and 25.1% who were 65 years of age or older. The median age was 46.9 years. For every 100 females, there were 102.6 males. For every 100 females ages 18 and older, there were 111.6 males.

The 2016–2020 5-year American Community Survey estimates show that the median household income was $61,875 (with a margin of error of +/- $33,052) and the median family income was $76,061 (+/- $906). Males had a median income of $31,406 (+/- $4,356) versus $45,377 (+/- $11,566) for females. The median income for those above 16 years old was $39,861 (+/- $11,065). Approximately, 2.6% of families and 7.0% of the population were below the poverty line, including 7.5% of those under the age of 18 and 9.1% of those ages 65 or over.

=== 2010 census ===
As of the census of 2010, there were 558 people, 219 households, and 142 families living in the city. The population density was 1,328.6 inhabitants per square mile (513.0/km^{2}). There were 247 housing units at an average density of 588.1 per square mile (227.1/km^{2}). The racial makeup of the city was 93.7% White, 2.0% African American, 1.3% Native American, 0.2% Pacific Islander, 0.2% from other races, and 2.7% from two or more races. Hispanic or Latino of any race were 1.1% of the population.

There were 219 households, of which 34.2% had children under the age of 18 living with them, 43.4% were married couples living together, 10.5% had a female householder with no husband present, 11.0% had a male householder with no wife present, and 35.2% were non-families. 28.8% of all households were made up of individuals, and 14.6% had someone living alone who was 65 years of age or older. The average household size was 2.36 and the average family size was 2.75.

The median age in the city was 45.4 years. 23.7% of residents were under the age of 18; 7.1% were between the ages of 18 and 24; 18.5% were from 25 to 44; 28.9% were from 45 to 64; and 21.9% were 65 years of age or older. The gender makeup of the city was 45.7% male and 54.3% female.

=== 2000 census ===
As of the census of 2000, there were 562 people, 224 households, and 140 families living in the city. The population density was 1,351.3 inhabitants per square mile (521.7/km^{2}). There were 255 housing units at an average density of 613.1 per square mile (236.7/km^{2}). The racial makeup of the city was 96.44% White, 0.36% African American, 1.96% Native American, and 1.25% from two or more races. Hispanic or Latino of any race were 0.36% of the population.

There were 224 households, out of which 28.6% had children under the age of 18 living with them, 48.7% were married couples living together, 9.4% had a female householder with no husband present, and 37.5% were non-families. 31.3% of all households were made up of individuals, and 19.6% had someone living alone who was 65 years of age or older. The average household size was 2.34 and the average family size was 2.99.

In the city, the population was spread out, with 24.7% under the age of 18, 7.7% from 18 to 24, 21.9% from 25 to 44, 20.5% from 45 to 64, and 25.3% who were 65 years of age or older. The median age was 42 years. For every 100 females, there were 90.5 males. For every 100 females age 18 and over, there were 80.8 males.

The median income for a household in the city was $30,179, and the median income for a family was $37,750. Males had a median income of $25,729 versus $19,028 for females. The per capita income for the city was $14,080. About 8.7% of families and 13.1% of the population were below the poverty line, including 6.7% of those under age 18 and 25.3% of those age 65 or over.

== Education ==
The community is served by Marmaton Valley USD 256 public school district. The district high school is Marmaton Valley High School located in Moran. Marmaton Valley High School mascot is Wildcats.

== Transportation ==
The nearest intercity bus stop is located in Gas. Service is provided by Jefferson Lines on a route from Minneapolis to Tulsa.

== Notable person ==
- Debra Dene Barnes, 1968 Miss America
