= Gas, Kansas =

City in Allen County, Kansas

- City
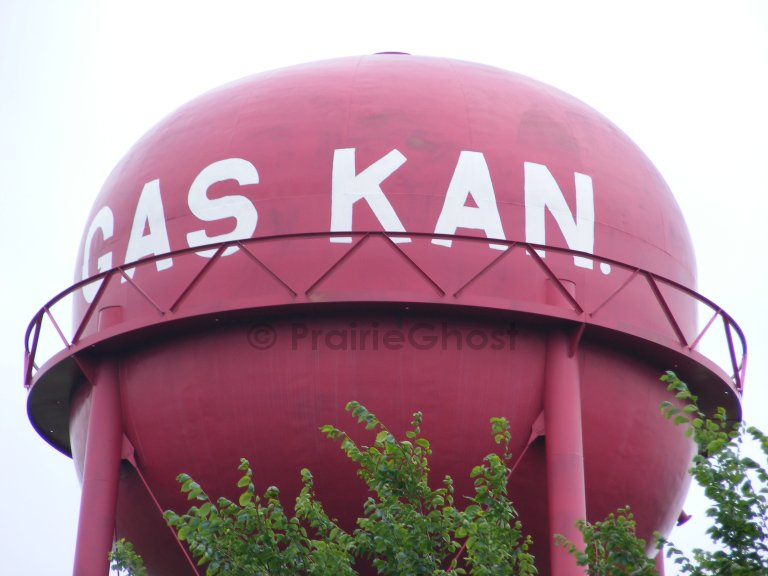
- "Gas Kan"- shaped Watertower in Gas (2012)
- Motto(s): "Don't Pass Gas, Stop and Enjoy It"
- Location within Allen County and Kansas

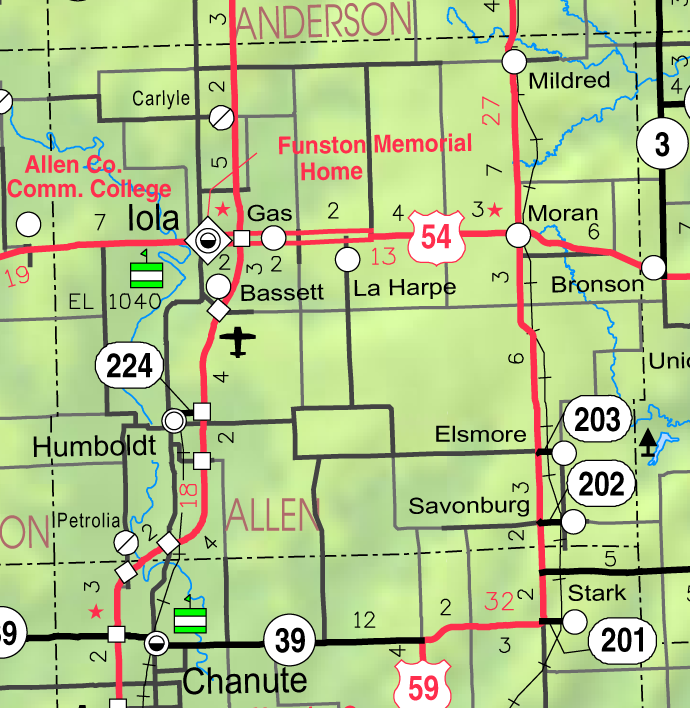
- KDOT map of Allen County (legend)
- Coordinates: 37°55′23″N 95°20′43″W
- Country: United States
- State: Kansas
- County: Allen
- Township: Elm
- Founded: 1898
- Incorporated: 1901
- Named for: Natural gas

Area
  - Total: 0.72 sq mi (1.87 km^{2})
  - Land: 0.72 sq mi (1.86 km^{2})
  - Water: 0 sq mi (0.00 km^{2})
- Elevation: 1,020 ft (310 m)

Population (2020)
  - Total: 475
  - Density: 661/sq mi (255/km^{2})
- Time zone: UTC-6 (CST)
  - Summer (DST): UTC-5 (CDT)
- ZIP Code: 66742
- Area code: 620
- FIPS code: 20-25975
- GNIS ID: 2394865
- Website: cityofgasks.gov

Gas is a city in Allen County, Kansas, United States. As of the 2020 census, the population of the city was 475. The city was named for the abundant natural gas that was found in the area.

== History ==
When natural gas was discovered in Elm Township in the summer of 1898 E.K. Taylor sold 60 acres (24 ha) of his farm to some spelter companies and in October sub-divided the remainder into lots, which was the beginning of "Gas City". The place grew rapidly, the cheap fuel afforded by the immense supply of natural gas bringing in a number of large manufacturing plants of various kinds. In 1910 the population was 1,281, and the city had a bank, a daily and a weekly newspaper, an opera house, an international money order postoffice (first opened in August 1899) from which mail was distributed to the surrounding country by rural free delivery, several good mercantile houses, telegraph and express offices.

== Geography ==
Gas is situated along U.S. Route 54 in Elm Township, the city is about three miles (5 km) east of the city of Iola (the county seat) and 2 1/2 miles west of the city of La Harpe. The interchange between U.S. Routes 54 and 169 is about two miles (3 km) west of Gas.

According to the United States Census Bureau, the city has a total area of 0.73 square miles (1.89 km^{2}), all of it land.

== Demographics ==
Historical population
Census	Pop.	Note	%±
1910	1,281		—
1920	367		−71.4%
1930	326		−11.2%
1940	357		9.5%
1950	294		−17.6%
1960	342		16.3%
1970	438		28.1%
1980	543		24.0%
1990	505		−7.0%
2000	556		10.1%
2010	564		1.4%
2020	475		−15.8%
U.S. Decennial Census

=== 2020 census ===
The 2020 United States census counted 475 people, 193 households, and 124 families in Gas. The population density was 659.7 per square mile (254.7/km^{2}). There were 219 housing units at an average density of 304.2 per square mile (117.4/km^{2}). The racial makeup was 89.89% (427) white or European American (88.21% non-Hispanic white), 1.26% (6) black or African-American, 1.89% (9) Native American or Alaska Native, 1.26% (6) Asian, 0.0% (0) Pacific Islander or Native Hawaiian, 0.42% (2) from other races, and 5.26% (25) from two or more races. Hispanic or Latino of any race was 2.53% (12) of the population.

Of the 193 households, 26.4% had children under the age of 18; 48.2% were married couples living together; 24.4% had a female householder with no spouse or partner present. 30.1% of households consisted of individuals and 14.5% had someone living alone who was 65 years of age or older. The average household size was 2.1 and the average family size was 2.5. The percent of those with a bachelor's degree or higher was estimated to be 16.8% of the population.

24.2% of the population was under the age of 18, 8.6% from 18 to 24, 21.3% from 25 to 44, 23.6% from 45 to 64, and 22.3% who were 65 years of age or older. The median age was 41.1 years. For every 100 females, there were 101.3 males. For every 100 females ages 18 and older, there were 100.0 males.

The 2016–2020 5-year American Community Survey estimates show that the median household income was $56,696 (with a margin of error of +/- $8,121) and the median family income was $58,583 (+/- $3,402). Males had a median income of $35,417 (+/- $16,031) versus $16,875 (+/- $7,626) for females. The median income for those above 16 years old was $24,773 (+/- $8,334). Approximately, 9.0% of families and 13.8% of the population were below the poverty line, including 8.8% of those under the age of 18 and 34.2% of those ages 65 or over.

=== 2010 census ===
As of the census of 2010, there were 564 people, 216 households, and 149 families residing in the city. The population density was 772.6 inhabitants per square mile (298.3/km^{2}). There were 246 housing units at an average density of 337.0 per square mile (130.1/km^{2}). The racial makeup of the city was 95.7% White, 0.4% African American, 1.6% Native American, 1.4% from other races, and 0.9% from two or more races. Hispanic or Latino of any race were 2.0% of the population.

There were 216 households, of which 33.3% had children under the age of 18 living with them, 56.0% were married couples living together, 9.7% had a female householder with no husband present, 3.2% had a male householder with no wife present, and 31.0% were non-families. 23.1% of all households were made up of individuals, and 13.9% had someone living alone who was 65 years of age or older. The average household size was 2.61 and the average family size was 3.03.

The median age in the city was 38.7 years. 27.7% of residents were under the age of 18; 7.1% were between the ages of 18 and 24; 21.2% were from 25 to 44; 28.1% were from 45 to 64; and 15.8% were 65 years of age or older. The gender makeup of the city was 50.7% male and 49.3% female.

=== 2000 census ===
As of the census of 2000, there were 556 people, 217 households, and 167 families residing in the city. The population density was 735.0 inhabitants per square mile (283.8/km^{2}). There were 234 housing units at an average density of 309.4 per square mile (119.5/km^{2}). The racial makeup of the city was 94.60% White, 0.18% African American, 1.26% Native American, 0.72% Asian, 0.18% from other races, and 3.06% from two or more races. Hispanic or Latino of any race were 2.16% of the population.

There were 217 households, out of which 34.6% had children under the age of 18 living with them, 65.9% were married couples living together, 7.8% had a female householder with no husband present, and 22.6% were non-families. 20.7% of all households were made up of individuals, and 7.8% had someone living alone who was 65 years of age or older. The average household size was 2.56 and the average family size was 2.94.

In the city, the population was spread out, with 26.6% under the age of 18, 8.5% from 18 to 24, 29.0% from 25 to 44, 23.0% from 45 to 64, and 12.9% who were 65 years of age or older. The median age was 38 years. For every 100 females, there were 104.4 males. For every 100 females age 18 and over, there were 96.2 males.

The median income for a household in the city was $35,804, and the median income for a family was $38,942. Males had a median income of $25,104 versus $18,500 for females. The per capita income for the city was $14,012. About 9.4% of families and 12.4% of the population were below the poverty line, including 11.9% of those under age 18 and 10.9% of those age 65 or over.

== Transportation ==
Intercity bus service is provided by Jefferson Lines on a route from Minneapolis to Tulsa.
