= Charleston Township, Kansas =

Township in Washington County, Kansas, U.S.

Charleston Township
- Township
- Location within Washington County
- Coordinates: 39.879542°N 96.966939°W
- Country: United States
- State: Kansas
- County: Washington
- Established: 1874

Government
  - District 2 Commissioner: Arthur Schottel

Area
  - Total: 35.804 sq mi (92.73 km^{2})
  - Land: 35.454 sq mi (91.83 km^{2})
  - Water: 0.35 sq mi (0.91 km^{2}) 0.98%

Population (2020)
  - Total: 67
  - Density: 1.9/sq mi (0.73/km^{2})
- Time zone: UTC-6 (CST)
  - Summer (DST): UTC-5 (CDT)
- Area code: 785
- GNIS feature ID: 472644

Charleston Township is a township in Washington County, Kansas, United States. As of the 2020 census, its population was 67.

== History ==
Charleston Township was created in 1874 from parts of Hanover Township, Hollenberg Township (no longer exists), and Washington Township.

Charleston Township is also home to two now-extinct towns: Emmons and Rogersville. Emmons' post office was open from 1885 to 1918, and had a population of 50 in 1910. Rogersville's post office was open from 1860 to 1864. It was founded on the farm of a judge named S. F. Snider.

== Geography ==
Charleston Township covers an area of 35.804 square miles (92.73 km^{2}), 0.98% of it water. Mill Creek and Devils Creek flow through the township.

=== Adjacent townships ===
Franklin Township, Washington County
Highland Township, Washington County	northwest	north	northeast	Independence Township, Washington County
Farmington Township, Washington County	west	self	east	Hanover Township, Washington County
Washington Township, Washington County	southwest	south	southeast	Little Blue Township, Washington County
Logan Township, Washington County

== Demographics ==
As of the 2020 census, the township had a population of 67, giving a population density of 1.9 people per square mile (0.73 people/km^{2}). The racial makeup of the township was 86.6% White, 1.5% Asian, 3.0% from some other race, and 9.0% from two or more races. Hispanics or Latinos of any race were 4.5% of the population.

The 2020–2024 American Community Survey estimated that the township contained 27 households and 27 housing units.
