= Franklin Township =

Franklin Township may refer to the following places in the United States:

== Arkansas ==
- Franklin Township, Carroll County, Arkansas
- Franklin Township, Desha County, Arkansas, in Desha County, Arkansas
- Franklin Township, Drew County, Arkansas, in Drew County, Arkansas
- Franklin Township, Grant County, Arkansas, in Grant County, Arkansas
- Franklin Township, Howard County, Arkansas, in Howard County, Arkansas
- Franklin Township, Izard County, Arkansas, in Izard County, Arkansas
- Franklin Township, Little River County, Arkansas, in Little River County, Arkansas
- Franklin Township, Stone County, Arkansas, in Stone County, Arkansas
- Franklin Township, Union County, Arkansas, in Union County, Arkansas

== Illinois ==
- Franklin Township, DeKalb County, Illinois

== Indiana ==
- Franklin Township, DeKalb County, Indiana
- Franklin Township, Floyd County, Indiana
- Franklin Township, Grant County, Indiana
- Franklin Township, Harrison County, Indiana
- Franklin Township, Hendricks County, Indiana
- Franklin Township, Henry County, Indiana
- Franklin Township, Johnson County, Indiana
- Franklin Township, Kosciusko County, Indiana
- Franklin Township, Marion County, Indiana
- Franklin Township, Montgomery County, Indiana
- Franklin Township, Owen County, Indiana
- Franklin Township, Pulaski County, Indiana
- Franklin Township, Putnam County, Indiana
- Franklin Township, Randolph County, Indiana
- Franklin Township, Ripley County, Indiana
- Franklin Township, Washington County, Indiana
- Franklin Township, Wayne County, Indiana

== Iowa ==
- Franklin Township, Allamakee County, Iowa
- Franklin Township, Appanoose County, Iowa
- Franklin Township, Bremer County, Iowa
- Franklin Township, Cass County, Iowa
- Franklin Township, Clarke County, Iowa
- Franklin Township, Decatur County, Iowa
- Franklin Township, Des Moines County, Iowa
- Franklin Township, Greene County, Iowa
- Franklin Township, Lee County, Iowa
- Franklin Township, Linn County, Iowa
- Franklin Township, Marion County, Iowa, in Marion County
- Franklin Township, Monona County, Iowa
- Franklin Township, Monroe County, Iowa
- Franklin Township, O'Brien County, Iowa
- Franklin Township, Polk County, Iowa
- Franklin Township, Story County, Iowa
- Franklin Township, Washington County, Iowa

== Kansas ==
- Franklin Township, Bourbon County, Kansas
- Franklin Township, Edwards County, Kansas
- Franklin Township, Franklin County, Kansas
- Franklin Township, Jackson County, Kansas
- Franklin Township, Lincoln County, Kansas, in Lincoln County
- Franklin Township, Marshall County, Kansas, in Marshall County
- Franklin Township, Ness County, Kansas, in Ness County
- Franklin Township, Trego County, Kansas, in Trego County, Kansas
- Franklin Township, Washington County, Kansas, in Washington County, Kansas

== Michigan ==
- Franklin Township, Clare County, Michigan
- Franklin Township, Houghton County, Michigan
- Franklin Township, Lenawee County, Michigan

== Minnesota ==
- Franklin Township, Wright County, Minnesota

== Missouri ==
- Franklin Township, Dent County, Missouri
- Franklin Township, Grundy County, Missouri
- Franklin Township, Howard County, Missouri
- Franklin Township, Laclede County, Missouri
- Franklin Township, Miller County, Missouri
- Franklin Township, Newton County, Missouri, in Newton County, Missouri

== Nebraska ==
- Franklin Township, Butler County, Nebraska
- Franklin Township, Fillmore County, Nebraska

== New Jersey ==
- Franklin Township, Bergen County, New Jersey, historical
- Franklin Township, Essex County, New Jersey, now the township of Nutley
- Franklin Township, Gloucester County, New Jersey
- Franklin Township, Hunterdon County, New Jersey
- Franklin Township, Somerset County, New Jersey
- Franklin Township, Warren County, New Jersey

== North Carolina ==
- Franklin Township, Rowan County, North Carolina
- Franklin Township, Surry County, North Carolina

== Ohio ==
- Franklin Township, Adams County, Ohio
- Franklin Township, Brown County, Ohio
- Franklin Township, Clermont County, Ohio
- Franklin Township, Columbiana County, Ohio
- Franklin Township, Coshocton County, Ohio
- Franklin Township, Darke County, Ohio
- Franklin Township, Franklin County, Ohio
- Franklin Township, Fulton County, Ohio
- Franklin Township, Harrison County, Ohio
- Franklin Township, Jackson County, Ohio
- Franklin Township, Licking County, Ohio
- Franklin Township, Mercer County, Ohio
- Franklin Township, Monroe County, Ohio
- Franklin Township, Morrow County, Ohio
- Franklin Township, Portage County, Ohio
- Franklin Township, Richland County, Ohio
- Franklin Township, Ross County, Ohio
- Franklin Township, Shelby County, Ohio
- Franklin Township, Summit County, Ohio, now the city of New Franklin
- Franklin Township, Tuscarawas County, Ohio
- Franklin Township, Warren County, Ohio
- Franklin Township, Wayne County, Ohio

== Pennsylvania ==
- Franklin Township, Adams County, Pennsylvania
- Franklin Township, Beaver County, Pennsylvania
- Franklin Township, Bradford County, Pennsylvania
- Franklin Township, Butler County, Pennsylvania
- Franklin Township, Carbon County, Pennsylvania
- Franklin Township, Chester County, Pennsylvania
- Franklin Township, Columbia County, Pennsylvania
- Franklin Township, Erie County, Pennsylvania
- Franklin Township, Fayette County, Pennsylvania
- Franklin Township, Greene County, Pennsylvania
- Franklin Township, Huntingdon County, Pennsylvania
- Franklin Township, Luzerne County, Pennsylvania
- Franklin Township, Lycoming County, Pennsylvania
- Franklin Township, Snyder County, Pennsylvania
- Franklin Township, Susquehanna County, Pennsylvania
- Franklin Township, York County, Pennsylvania

== North Dakota ==
- Franklin Township, Steele County, North Dakota, in Steele County, North Dakota

== South Dakota ==
- Franklin Township, Jerauld County, South Dakota, in Jerauld County, South Dakota
- Franklin Township, Lake County, South Dakota, in Lake County, South Dakota

== See also ==
- Rural Municipality of Franklin, Manitoba, Canada
- Franklin (disambiguation)
