= Swede Creek Township, Kansas =

Township in Riley County, Kansas, U.S.

Swede Creek Township
- Township
- Location within Riley County
- Coordinates: 39.532191°N 96.702171°W
- Country: United States
- State: Kansas
- County: Riley

Government
  - District 2 County Commissioner: John Ford (R)

Area
  - Total: 49.779 sq mi (128.93 km^{2})
  - Land: 48.654 sq mi (126.01 km^{2})
  - Water: 1.125 sq mi (2.91 km^{2}) 2.26%

Population (2020)
  - Total: 204
  - Density: 4.19/sq mi (1.62/km^{2})
- Time zone: UTC-6 (CST)
  - Summer (DST): UTC-5 (CDT)
- Area code: 785
- GNIS feature ID: 473383

Swede Creek Township is a township in Riley County, Kansas, United States. As of the 2020 census, its population was 204.

== Geography ==
Swede Creek Township covers an area of 49.779 square miles (128.93 square kilometers). The Big Blue River flows through it.

=== Adjacent townships ===
Cottage Hill Township, Marshall County; Blue Rapids Township, Marshall County
Lincoln Township, Washington County	northwest	north	northeast	Bigelow Township, Marshall County
May Day Township, Riley County	west	self	east	Spring Creek Township, Pottawatomie County
Center Township, Riley County	southwest	south	southeast	Blue Valley Township, Pottawatomie County
Jackson Township, Riley County

== Transportation ==
=== Major highways ===
- US-77
