= Barnes Township, Kansas =

Township in Washington County, Kansas, U.S.

Barnes Township
- Township
- Location within Washington County
- Coordinates: 39.696882°N 96.86249°W
- Country: United States
- State: Kansas
- County: Washington

Government
  - District 1 Commissioner: Scott Zabokrtsky

Area
  - Total: 35.927 sq mi (93.05 km^{2})
  - Land: 35.859 sq mi (92.87 km^{2})
  - Water: 0.068 sq mi (0.18 km^{2}) 0.19%

Population (2020)
  - Total: 239
  - Density: 6.66/sq mi (2.57/km^{2})
- Time zone: UTC-6 (CST)
  - Summer (DST): UTC-5 (CDT)
- Area code: 785
- GNIS feature ID: 473143

Barnes Township is a township in Washington County, Kansas, United States. As of the 2020 census, its population was 239.

== History ==
Barnes Township was created from Little Blue Township and Lincoln Township.

== Geography ==
Barnes Township covers an area of 35.927 square miles (93.05 km^{2}), 0.19% of it water. The Little Blue River flows through it, as well as Coon Creek, Camp Creek, and Mercer Creek.

=== Communities ===
- Barnes

=== Adjacent townships ===
Little Blue Township, Washington County
Logan Township, Washington County	northwest	north	northeast	Walnut Township, Marshall County
Greenleaf Township, Washington County	west	self	east	Waterville Township, Marshall County
Kimeo Township, Washington County	southwest	south	southeast	Cottage Hill Township, Marshall County
Lincoln Township, Washington County

== Transportation ==
=== Major highways ===
- K-9
- K-148

== Demographics ==
As of the 2020 census, the township had a population of 239, giving a population density of 6.66 people per square mile (2.57 people/km^{2}). The racial makeup of the township was 89.5% White, 1.7% from some other race, and 8.8% from two or more races. Hispanics or Latinos of any race were 10.9% of the population.

The 2020–2024 American Community Survey estimated that the township contained 135 households and 154 housing units.
