= Franklin Township, Nebraska =

Franklin Township, Nebraska may refer to the following places:

- Franklin Township, Butler County, Nebraska
- Franklin Township, Fillmore County, Nebraska

See also: Franklin Township (disambiguation)
