= Farmington Township, Kansas =

Farmington Township, Kansas may refer to:

- Farmington Township, Republic County, Kansas
- Farmington Township, Stafford County, Kansas
- Farmington Township, Washington County, Kansas
