= Kimeo Township, Kansas =

Township in Washington County, Kansas, U.S.

Kimeo Township
- Township
- Location within Washington County
- Coordinates: 39.60827°N 96.973148°W
- Country: United States
- State: Kansas
- County: Washington

Government
  - District 1 Commissioner: Scott Zabokrtsky

Area
  - Total: 36.01 sq mi (93.3 km^{2})
  - Land: 35.905 sq mi (92.99 km^{2})
  - Water: 0.105 sq mi (0.27 km^{2}) 0.29%

Population (2020)
  - Total: 54
  - Density: 1.5/sq mi (0.58/km^{2})
- Time zone: UTC-6 (CST)
  - Summer (DST): UTC-5 (CDT)
- Area code: 785
- GNIS feature ID: 473135

Kimeo Township is a township in Washington County, Kansas, United States. As of the 2020 census, its population was 54.

== History ==
Kimeo Township was created from part of Lincoln Township and Sherman Township. The township is home to the now-extinct town of Kimeo. Kimeo was established by Irish settlers in the 1870s. The post office was opened in 1872 but closed in 1904. Kimeo had a population of 50 in 1910.

== Geography ==
Kimeo Township covers an area of 36.01 square miles (93.3 km^{2}), 0.29% of it water.

=== Adjacent townships ===
Greenleaf Township, Washington County
| Linn Township, Washington County | northwest | north | northeast | Barnes Township, Washington County |
| Sherman Township, Washington County | west | self | east | Lincoln Township, Washington County |
| | | south | southeast | May Day Township, Riley County |
Goshen Township, Clay County

== Demographics ==
As of the 2020 census, the township had a population of 54, giving a population density of 1.5 people per square mile (0.58 people/km^{2}). The racial makeup of the township was 98.1% White and 1.9% from two or more races.

The 2020–2024 American Community Survey estimated that the township contained 46 households and 46 housing units.
