= Haddam Township, Kansas =

Township in Washington County, Kansas, U.S.

Haddam Township
- Township
- Location within Washington County
- Coordinates: 39.878503°N 97.304108°W
- Country: United States
- State: Kansas
- County: Washington

Government
  - District 3 Commissioner: Raleigh Ordoyne

Area
  - Total: 35.922 sq mi (93.04 km^{2})
  - Land: 35.847 sq mi (92.84 km^{2})
  - Water: 0.075 sq mi (0.19 km^{2}) 0.21%

Population (2020)
  - Total: 158
  - Density: 4.41/sq mi (1.70/km^{2})
- Time zone: UTC-6 (CST)
  - Summer (DST): UTC-5 (CDT)
- Area code: 785
- GNIS feature ID: 472625

Haddam Township is a township in Washington County, Kansas, United States. As of the 2020 census, its population was 158.

== History ==
Haddam Township was created from parts of Mill Creek Township and Union Township.

== Geography ==
Haddam Township covers an area of 35.922 square miles (93.04 km^{2}), 0.21% of it water. Mill Creek, its north and south forks, Bowman Creek, Turkey Creek, Myer Creek, Mulberry Creek, Cherry Creek, and Davis Creek all flow through it.

=== Communities ===
- Haddam

=== Adjacent townships ===
Union Township, Washington County
Albion Township, Republic County	northwest	north	northeast	Lowe Township, Washington County
Farmington Township, Republic County	west	self	east	Mill Creek Township, Washington County
Richland Township, Republic County	southwest	south	southeast	Coleman Township, Washington County
Grant Township, Washington County

== Transportation ==
=== Major highways ===
- K-22

== Demographics ==
As of the 2020 census, the township had a population of 158, giving a population density of 4.41 people per square mile (1.70 people/km^{2}). The racial makeup of the township was 93.0% White, 1.3% Black or African American, 0.6% Asian, and 5.1% from two or more races. Hispanics or Latinos of any race were 3.2% of the population.

The 2020–2024 American Community Survey estimated that the township contained 58 households and 78 housing units.
