= Greenleaf Township, Kansas =

Township in Washington County, Kansas, U.S.

Greenleaf Township
- Township
- Location within Washington County
- Coordinates: 39.691476°N 96.972659°W
- Country: United States
- State: Kansas
- County: Washington

Government
  - District 1 Commissioner: Scott Zabokrtsky

Area
  - Total: 35.901 sq mi (92.98 km^{2})
  - Land: 35.814 sq mi (92.76 km^{2})
  - Water: 0.087 sq mi (0.23 km^{2}) 0.24%

Population (2020)
  - Total: 415
  - Density: 11.6/sq mi (4.47/km^{2})
- Time zone: UTC-6 (CST)
  - Summer (DST): UTC-5 (CDT)
- Area code: 785
- GNIS feature ID: 473134

Greenleaf Township is a township in Washington County, Kansas, United States. As of the 2020 census, its population was 415.

== History ==
Greenleaf Township was created from parts of Sherman Township, Little Blue Township, and Lincoln Township.

== Geography ==
Greenleaf Township covers an area of 35.901 square miles (92.98 km^{2}), 0.24% of it water. Coon Creek flows through it.

=== Communities ===
- Greenleaf

=== Adjacent townships ===
Logan Township, Washington County
Washington Township, Washington County	northwest	north	northeast	Little Blue Township, Washington County
Linn Township, Washington County	west	self	east	Barnes Township, Washington County
Sherman Township, Washington County	southwest	south	southeast	Lincoln Township, Washington County
Kimeo Township, Washington County

== Transportation ==
=== Major highways ===
- K-9
- K-119

== Demographics ==
As of the 2020 census, the township had a population of 415, giving a population density of 11.6 people per square mile (4.5 people/km^{2}). The racial makeup of the township was 84.8% White, 5.1% from some other race, and 10.1% from two or more races. Hispanics or Latinos of any race were 12.8% of the population.

The 2020–2024 American Community Survey estimated that the township contained 12 households and 35 housing units.
