= Franklin Township, New Jersey =

Franklin Township is the name of some places in the U.S. state of New Jersey:

- Franklin Township, Gloucester County, New Jersey
- Franklin Township, Hunterdon County, New Jersey
- Franklin Township, Somerset County, New Jersey
- Franklin Township, Warren County, New Jersey
- Franklin Township, Bergen County, New Jersey (defunct)
- Franklin Township, Essex County, New Jersey, now known as Nutley, New Jersey

== See also ==
- Franklin, New Jersey in Sussex County
- Franklin Lakes, New Jersey
- Franklin Township (disambiguation)
