= Franklin Township, Arkansas =

Franklin Township, Arkansas may refer to:

- Franklin Township, Calhoun County, Arkansas
- Franklin Township, Carroll County, Arkansas
- Franklin Township, Desha County, Arkansas
- Franklin Township, Drew County, Arkansas
- Franklin Township, Grant County, Arkansas
- Franklin Township, Howard County, Arkansas
- Franklin Township, Izard County, Arkansas
- Franklin Township, Little River County, Arkansas
- Franklin Township, Marion County, Arkansas
- Franklin Township, Stone County, Arkansas
- Franklin Township, Union County, Arkansas

== See also ==
- List of townships in Arkansas
- Franklin Township (disambiguation)
