= Marysville Township, Marshall County, Kansas =

Township in Marshall County, Kansas, U.S.

Marysville Township
- Township
- Interactive map of Marysville Township
- Coordinates: 39.877769°N 96.629501°W
- Country: United States
- State: Kansas
- County: Marshall

Area
  - Total: 31.041 sq mi (80.40 km^{2})
  - Land: 30.659 sq mi (79.41 km^{2})
  - Water: 0.382 sq mi (0.99 km^{2}) 1.23%

Population (2020)
  - Total: 270
  - Density: 8.8/sq mi (3.4/km^{2})
- Time zone: UTC-6 (CST)
  - Summer (DST): UTC-5 (CDT)
- Area code: 785

Marysville Township is a township in Marshall County, Kansas, United States. As of the 2020 census, its population was 270. The city of Marysville is completely surrounded by the township, but is not part of it.

== Geography ==
Marysville Township covers an area of 31.041 square miles (80.40 square kilometers). The Big Blue River runs through it.

=== Adjacent townships ===
- Oketo Township, Marshall County (north)
- Balderson Township, Marshall County (northeast)
- Franklin Township, Marshall County (east)
- Center Township, Marshall County (southeast)
- Elm Creek Township, Marshall County (south)
- Walnut Township, Marshall County (southwest)
- Logan Township, Marshall County (west)
- Herkimer Township, Marshall County (northwest)

=== Major highways ===
- US-36
- US-77
