= Murray Township, Kansas =

Township in Marshall County, Kansas, U.S.

Murray Township
- Township
- Interactive map of Murray Township
- Coordinates: 39.864371°N 96.285247°W
- Country: United States
- State: Kansas
- County: Marshall

Area
  - Total: 35.65 sq mi (92.3 km^{2})
  - Land: 35.546 sq mi (92.06 km^{2})
  - Water: 0.104 sq mi (0.27 km^{2}) 0.29%

Population (2020)
  - Total: 600
  - Density: 17/sq mi (6.5/km^{2})
- Time zone: UTC-6 (CST)
  - Summer (DST): UTC-5 (CDT)
- Area code: 785

Murray Township is a township in Marshall County, Kansas, United States. As of the 2020 census, its population was 600.

== Geography ==
Murray Township covers an area of 35.65 square miles (92.3 square kilometers).

=== Communities ===
- Axtell

=== Adjacent townships ===
- St. Bridget Township, Marshall County (north)
- Clear Creek Township, Marshall County (northeast)
- Marion Township, Nemaha County (east)
- Center Township, Nemaha County (southeast)
- Lincoln Township, Marshall County (south)
- Rock Township, Marshall County (southwest)
- Guittard Township, Marshall County (west)
- Richland Township, Marshall County (northwest)

=== Major highways ===
- US-36
- K-87
- K-99
- K-110
