= Herkimer Township, Kansas =

Township in Marshall County, Kansas, U.S.

Herkimer Township
- Township
- Interactive map of Herkimer Township
- Coordinates: 39.951634°N 96.744974°W
- Country: United States
- State: Kansas
- County: Marshall

Area
  - Total: 35.656 sq mi (92.35 km^{2})
  - Land: 35.588 sq mi (92.17 km^{2})
  - Water: 0.068 sq mi (0.18 km^{2}) 0.19%

Population (2020)
  - Total: 191
  - Density: 5.37/sq mi (2.07/km^{2})
- Time zone: UTC-6 (CST)
  - Summer (DST): UTC-5 (CDT)
- Area code: 785

Herkimer Township is a township in Marshall County, Kansas, United States. As of the 2020 census, its population was 191.

== Geography ==
Herkimer Township covers an area of 35.656 square miles (92.35 square kilometers).

=== Adjacent townships ===
- Paddock Township, Gage County, Nebraska (north)
- Oketo Township, Marshall County (east)
- Marysville Township, Marshall County (southeast)
- Logan Township, Marshall County (south)
- Hanover Township, Washington County (southwest)
- Independence Township, Washington County (west)
- Glenwood Township, Gage County, Nebraska (northwest)
