= Oketo Township, Kansas =

Township in Marshall County, Kansas, U.S.

Oketo Township
- Township
- Interactive map of Oketo Township
- Coordinates: 39.954396°N 96.633816°W
- Country: United States
- State: Kansas
- County: Marshall

Area
  - Total: 35.459 sq mi (91.84 km^{2})
  - Land: 35.177 sq mi (91.11 km^{2})
  - Water: 0.282 sq mi (0.73 km^{2}) 0.80%

Population (2020)
  - Total: 221
  - Density: 6.28/sq mi (2.43/km^{2})
- Time zone: UTC-6 (CST)
  - Summer (DST): UTC-5 (CDT)
- Area code: 785

Oketo Township is a township in Marshall County, Kansas, United States. As of the 2020 census, its population was 221.

== Geography ==
Oketo Township covers an area of 35.459 square miles (91.84 square kilometers). The Big Blue River runs through it.

=== Communities ===
- Oketo

=== Adjacent townships ===
- Barneston Township, Gage County, Nebraska (north)
- Balderson Township, Marshall County (east)
- Franklin Township, Marshall County (southeast)
- Marysville Township, Marshall County (south)
- Logan Township, Marshall County (southwest)
- Herkimer Township, Marshall County (west)
- Paddock Township, Gage County, Nebraska (northwest)

=== Major highways ===
- US-77
- K-233
