= Center Township, Marshall County, Kansas =

Township in Marshall County, Kansas, U.S.

Center Township
- Township
- Interactive map of Center Township
- Coordinates: 39.782709°N 96.521243°W
- Country: United States
- State: Kansas
- County: Marshall

Area
  - Total: 37.777 sq mi (97.84 km^{2})
  - Land: 37.688 sq mi (97.61 km^{2})
  - Water: 0.089 sq mi (0.23 km^{2}) 0.24%

Population (2020)
  - Total: 130
  - Density: 3.4/sq mi (1.3/km^{2})
- Time zone: UTC-6 (CST)
  - Summer (DST): UTC-5 (CDT)
- Area code: 785

Center Township is a township in Marshall County, Kansas, United States. As of the 2020 census, its population was 130.

== Geography ==
Center Township covers an area of 37.777 square miles (97.84 square kilometers).

=== Adjacent townships ===
- Franklin Township, Marshall County (north)
- Guittard Township, Marshall County (northeast)
- Rock Township, Marshall County (east)
- Vermillion Township, Marshall County (southeast)
- Wells Township, Marshall County (south)
- Blue Rapids City Township, Marshall County (southwest)
- Elm Creek Township, Marshall County (west)
- Marysville Township, Marshall County (northwest)
