= Elm Creek Township, Marshall County, Kansas =

Township in Marshall County, Kansas, U.S.

Elm Creek Township
- Township
- Interactive map of Elm Creek Township
- Coordinates: 39.783263°N 96.643224°W
- Country: United States
- State: Kansas
- County: Marshall

Area
  - Total: 35.954 sq mi (93.12 km^{2})
  - Land: 35.621 sq mi (92.26 km^{2})
  - Water: 0.333 sq mi (0.86 km^{2}) 0.93%

Population (2020)
  - Total: 150
  - Density: 4.2/sq mi (1.6/km^{2})
- Time zone: UTC-6 (CST)
  - Summer (DST): UTC-5 (CDT)
- Area code: 785

Elm Creek Township is a township in Marshall County, Kansas, United States. As of the 2020 census, its population was 150.

== Geography ==
Elm Creek Township covers an area of 35.954 square miles (93.12 square kilometers). The Big Blue River runs through it.

=== Adjacent townships ===
- Marysville Township, Marshall County (north)
- Franklin Township, Marshall County (northeast)
- Center Township, Marshall County (east)
- Wells Township, Marshall County (southeast)
- Blue Rapids City Township, Marshall County (south)
- Waterville Township, Marshall County (southwest)
- Walnut Township, Marshall County (west)
- Logan Township, Marshall County (northwest)

=== Major highways ===
- US-77
