= Guittard Township, Kansas =

Township in Marshall County, Kansas, U.S.

Guittard Township
- Township
- Interactive map of Guittard Township
- Coordinates: 39.874675°N 96.403505°W
- Country: United States
- State: Kansas
- County: Marshall

Area
  - Total: 35.865 sq mi (92.89 km^{2})
  - Land: 35.785 sq mi (92.68 km^{2})
  - Water: 0.08 sq mi (0.21 km^{2}) 0.22%

Population (2020)
  - Total: 372
  - Density: 10.4/sq mi (4.01/km^{2})
- Time zone: UTC-6 (CST)
  - Summer (DST): UTC-5 (CDT)
- Area code: 785

Guittard Township is a township in Marshall County, Kansas, United States. As of the 2020 census, its population was 372.

== Geography ==
Guittard Township covers an area of 35.865 square miles (92.89 square kilometers).

=== Communities ===
- Beattie

=== Adjacent townships ===
- Richland Township, Marshall County (north)
- St. Bridget Township, Marshall County (northeast)
- Murray Township, Marshall County (east)
- Lincoln Township, Marshall County (southeast)
- Rock Township, Marshall County (south)
- Center Township, Marshall County (southwest)
- Franklin Township, Marshall County (west)
- Balderson Township, Marshall County (northwest)

=== Major highways ===
- US-36
- K-99
