= Richland Township, Marshall County, Kansas =

Township in Marshall County, Kansas, U.S.

Richland Township
- Township
- Interactive map of Richland Township
- Coordinates: 39.956855°N 96.40609°W
- Country: United States
- State: Kansas
- County: Marshall

Area
  - Total: 35.739 sq mi (92.56 km^{2})
  - Land: 35.641 sq mi (92.31 km^{2})
  - Water: 0.098 sq mi (0.25 km^{2}) 0.27%

Population (2020)
  - Total: 159
  - Density: 4.46/sq mi (1.72/km^{2})
- Time zone: UTC-6 (CST)
  - Summer (DST): UTC-5 (CDT)
- Area code: 785

Richland Township is a township in Marshall County, Kansas, United States. As of the 2020 census, its population was 159.

== Geography ==
Richland Township covers an area of 35.739 square miles (92.56 square kilometers).

=== Communities ===
- part of Summerfield

=== Adjacent townships ===
- St. Bridget Township, Marshall County (east)
- Murray Township, Marshall County (southeast)
- Guittard Township, Marshall County (south)
- Franklin Township, Marshall County (southwest)
- Balderson Township, Marshall County (west)
- Liberty Township, Gage County, Nebraska (northwest)

=== Major highways ===
- K-99
