= Wells Township, Kansas =

Township in Marshall County, Kansas, U.S.

Wells Township
- Township
- Interactive map of Wells Township
- Coordinates: 39.6964°N 96.5294°W
- Country: United States
- State: Kansas
- County: Marshall

Area
  - Total: 37.777 sq mi (97.84 km^{2})
  - Land: 37.667 sq mi (97.56 km^{2})
  - Water: 0.11 sq mi (0.28 km^{2}) 0.29%

Population (2020)
  - Total: 97
  - Density: 2.6/sq mi (0.99/km^{2})
- Time zone: UTC-6 (CST)
  - Summer (DST): UTC-5 (CDT)
- Area code: 785

Wells Township is a township in Marshall County, Kansas, United States.

== History ==
Wells Township was named for John D. Wells, a first settler.

== Geography ==
Wells Township covers an area of 37.777 square miles (97.84 square kilometers).

=== Adjacent townships ===
- Center Township, Marshall County (north)
- Rock Township, Marshall County (northeast)
- Vermillion Township, Marshall County (east)
- Clear Fork Township, Marshall County (southeast)
- Bigelow Township, Marshall County (south)
- Blue Rapids Township, Marshall County (southwest)
- Blue Rapids City Township, Marshall County (west)
- Elm Creek Township, Marshall County (northwest)

=== Major highways ===
- K-9
