= Balderson Township, Kansas =

Township in Marshall County, Kansas, U.S.

Balderson Township
- Township
- Interactive map of Balderson Township
- Coordinates: 39.954532°N 96.526453°W
- Country: United States
- State: Kansas
- County: Marshall

Area
  - Total: 37.682 sq mi (97.60 km^{2})
  - Land: 37.582 sq mi (97.34 km^{2})
  - Water: 0.1 sq mi (0.26 km^{2}) 0.27%

Population (2020)
  - Total: 91
  - Density: 2.4/sq mi (0.93/km^{2})
- Time zone: UTC-6 (CST)
  - Summer (DST): UTC-5 (CDT)
- Area code: 785

Balderson Township is a township in Marshall County, Kansas, United States. As of the 2020 census, its population was 91.

== Geography ==
Balderson Township covers an area of 37.682 square miles (97.60 square kilometers).

=== Adjacent townships ===
- Liberty Township, Gage County, Nebraska (north)
- Richland Township, Marshall County (east)
- Guittard Township, Marshall County (southeast)
- Franklin Township, Marshall County (south)
- Marysville Township, Marshall County (southwest)
- Oketo Township, Marshall County (west)
- Barneston Township, Gage County, Nebraska (northwest)
