= Lincoln Township, Marshall County, Kansas =

Township in Marshall County, Kansas, U.S.

Lincoln Township
- Township
- Interactive map of Lincoln Township
- Coordinates: 39.782392°N 96.29377°W
- Country: United States
- State: Kansas
- County: Marshall

Area
  - Total: 35.689 sq mi (92.43 km^{2})
  - Land: 35.485 sq mi (91.91 km^{2})
  - Water: 0.204 sq mi (0.53 km^{2}) 0.57%

Population (2020)
  - Total: 145
  - Density: 4.09/sq mi (1.58/km^{2})
- Time zone: UTC-6 (CST)
  - Summer (DST): UTC-5 (CDT)
- Area code: 785

Lincoln Township is a township in Marshall County, Kansas, United States. As of the 2020 census, its population was 145.

== Geography ==
Lincoln Township covers an area of 35.689 square miles (92.43 square kilometers).

=== Adjacent townships ===
- Murray Township, Marshall County (north)
- Marion Township, Nemaha County (northeast)
- Center Township, Nemaha County (east)
- Home Township, Nemaha County (southeast)
- Noble Township, Marshall County (south)
- Vermillion Township, Marshall County (southwest)
- Rock Township, Marshall County (west)
- Guittard Township, Marshall County (northwest)
