= Rohrbach Covered Bridge No. 24 =

- U.S. National Register of Historic Places
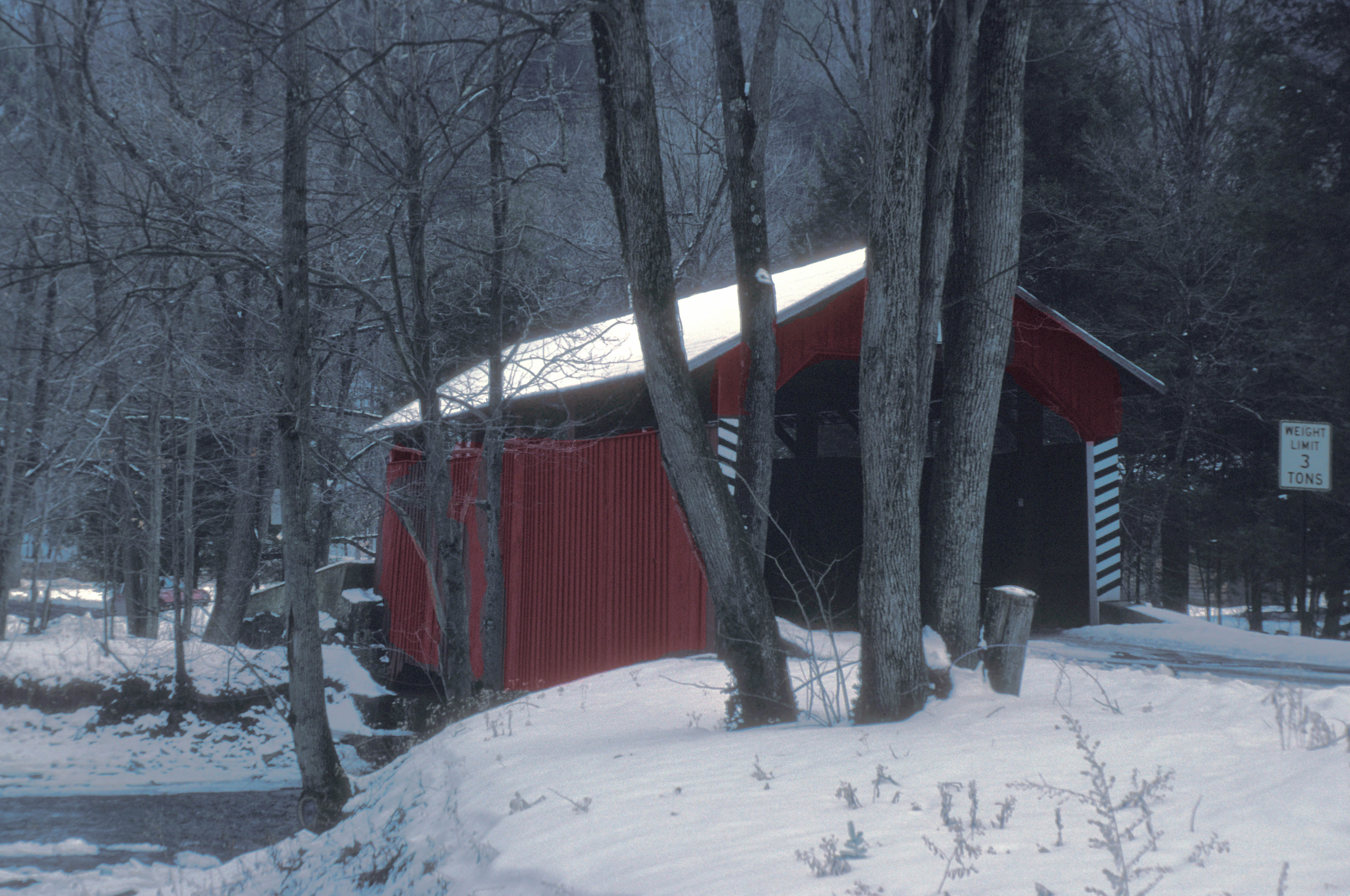

- Location within Pennsylvania Location within the United States
- Location: Pennsylvania Route 369, southwest of Catawissa, Franklin Township, Pennsylvania
- Coordinates: 40°54′0″N 76°30′43″W
- Area: 0.1 acres (0.040 ha)
- Built: 1846
- Built by: Joseph Fulton
- Architectural style: Queen Post Truss
- MPS: Covered Bridges of Columbia and Montour Counties TR
- NRHP reference No.: 79003197
- Added to NRHP: November 29, 1979

The Rohrbach Covered Bridge No. 24 was an historic, wooden covered bridge that was located in Franklin Township in Columbia County, Pennsylvania, United States.

It was listed on the National Register of Historic Places in 1979. The bridge was disassembled in October 1986 and the pieces are in storage at Knoebels Amusement Resort.

== History and architectural features ==
This historic structure was a 64.3-foot-long (19.6 m), Queen Post Truss bridge that was constructed in 1846. It crossed the South Branch of Roaring Creek, and was one of twenty-eight historic covered bridges that were located in Columbia and Montour counties.
