= Logan Township, Marshall County, Kansas =

Township in Marshall County, Kansas, U.S.

Logan Township
- Township
- Interactive map of Logan Township
- Coordinates: 39.878377°N 96.7406°W
- Country: United States
- State: Kansas
- County: Marshall

Area
  - Total: 35.948 sq mi (93.10 km^{2})
  - Land: 35.863 sq mi (92.88 km^{2})
  - Water: 0.085 sq mi (0.22 km^{2}) 0.24%

Population (2020)
  - Total: 251
  - Density: 7.00/sq mi (2.70/km^{2})
- Time zone: UTC-6 (CST)
  - Summer (DST): UTC-5 (CDT)
- Area code: 785

Logan Township is a township in Marshall County, Kansas, United States. As of the 2020 census, its population was 251.

== Geography ==
Logan Township covers an area of 35.948 square miles (93.10 square kilometers).

=== Communities ===
- Bremen
- Herkimer

=== Adjacent townships ===
- Herkimer Township, Marshall County (north)
- Oketo Township, Marshall County (northeast)
- Marysville Township, Marshall County (east)
- Elm Creek Township, Marshall County (southeast)
- Walnut Township, Marshall County (south)
- Little Blue Township, Washington County (southwest)
- Hanover Township, Washington County (west)
- Independence Township, Washington County (northwest)

=== Major highways ===
- US-36
