= Riegel Covered Bridge No. 6 =

- U.S. National Register of Historic Places
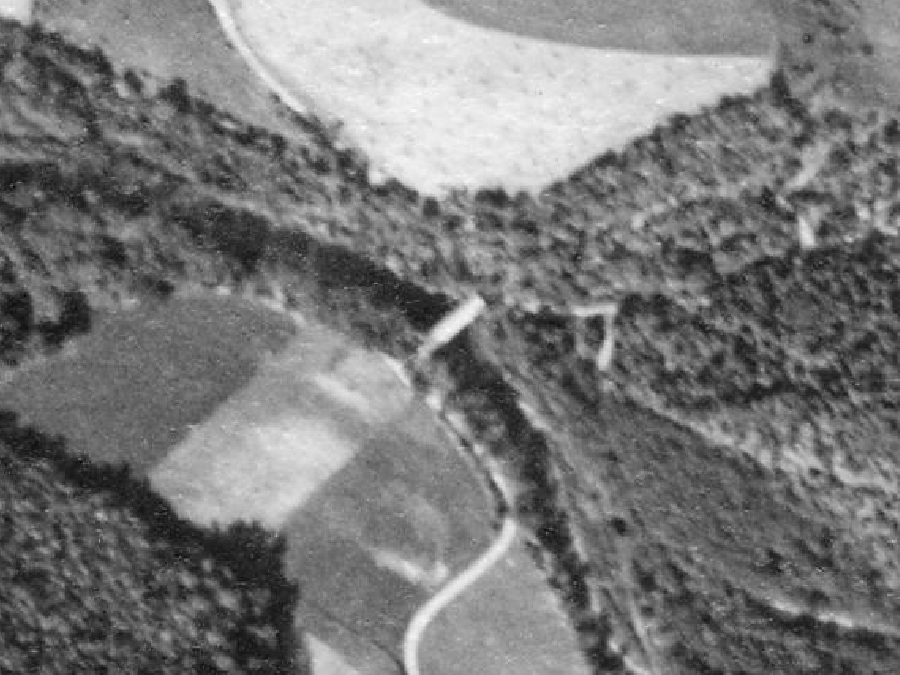
- Aerial view of the bridge over Roaring Creek in October 1938

- Location within Pennsylvania Location within the United States
- Location: Pennsylvania Route 312, southwest of Catawissa, Franklin Township, Pennsylvania
- Coordinates: 40°54′44″N 76°30′49″W
- Area: 0.1 acres (0.040 ha)
- Built: 1870
- Built by: Jacob Kostenbauder
- Architectural style: Burr Truss Arch
- MPS: Covered Bridges of Columbia and Montour Counties TR
- NRHP reference No.: 79003196
- Added to NRHP: November 29, 1979

The Riegel Covered Bridge No. 6 (also known as the Reuben Reigel's Covered Bridge) was an historic wooden covered bridge that was located in Franklin Township in Columbia County, Pennsylvania.

== History and architectural features ==
This historic structure was a 107.25-foot-long (32.69 m), Burr Truss arch bridge with a tarred metal roof, constructed in 1870. It crossed Roaring Creek.

It was one of twenty-eight historic covered bridges that were located in Columbia and Montour counties identified during the late-1970s.

It was listed on the National Register of Historic Places in 1979. The bridge was destroyed in an arson fire on May 30, 1979.
