= Rock Township, Kansas =

Township in Marshall County, Kansas, U.S.

Rock Township, Marshall County, Kansas
- Township
- Location within the state of Kansas
- Coordinates: 39°47′2″N 96°24′45″W
- Country: United States
- State: Kansas
- County: Marshall

Area
  - Total: 35.8 sq mi (92.6 km^{2})
  - Land: 35.7 sq mi (92.5 km^{2})
  - Water: 0.039 sq mi (0.1 km^{2})
- Elevation: 1,286 ft (392 m)

Population (2020)
  - Total: 159
  - Density: 4.45/sq mi (1.72/km^{2})
- Time zone: UTC-6 (Central (CST))
  - Summer (DST): UTC-5 (CDT)
- FIPS code: 20-60425
- GNIS feature ID: 0472935

Rock Township is a township in Marshall County, Kansas, United States.

== Geography ==
=== Adjacent townships ===
- Guittard Township, Marshall County (north)
- Murray Township, Marshall County (northeast)
- Lincoln Township, Marshall County (east)
- Noble Township, Marshall County (southeast)
- Vermillion Township, Marshall County (south)
- Wells Township, Marshall County (southwest)
- Center Township, Marshall County (west)
- Franklin Township, Marshall County (northwest)

=== Major highways ===
- K-99
