= Parr's Mill Covered Bridge No. 10 =

- U.S. National Register of Historic Places
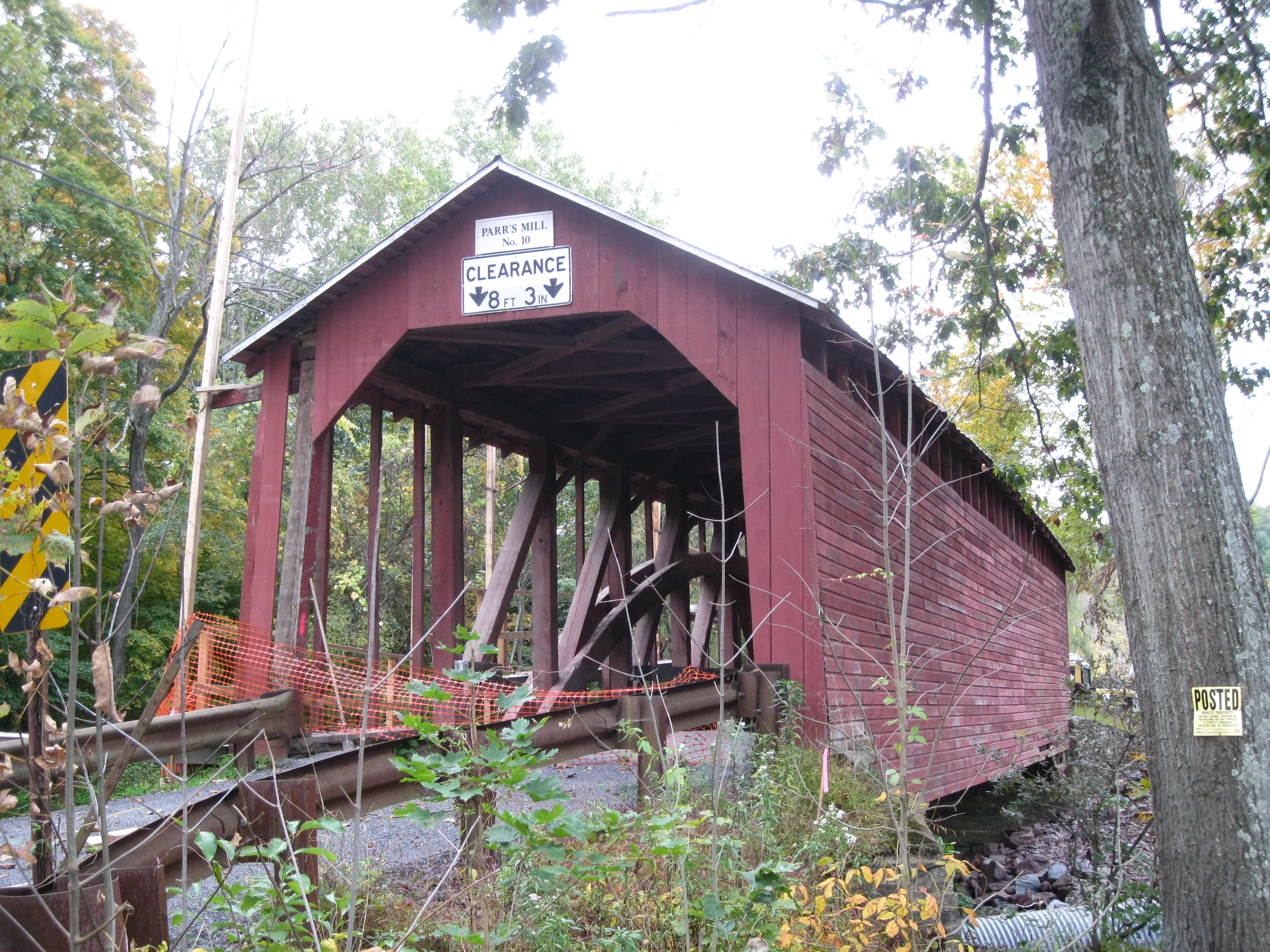
- The bridge being renovated in September 2012

- Location within Pennsylvania Location within the United States
- Location: Pennsylvania Route 371 at Parr's Mill, Cleveland Township and Franklin Township, Pennsylvania
- Coordinates: 40°54′23″N 76°28′23″W
- Area: 0.1 acres (0.040 ha)
- Built: 1865
- Built by: F.L. Shuman
- Architectural style: Burr Truss-Arch
- MPS: Covered Bridges of Columbia and Montour Counties TR
- NRHP reference No.: 79003189
- Added to NRHP: November 29, 1979

The Parr's Mill Covered Bridge No. 10 is an historic wooden covered bridge in Cleveland Township and Franklin Township in Columbia County, Pennsylvania, United States.

It was listed on the National Register of Historic Places in 1979.

== History and architectural features ==
This historic structure is a 84.25-foot-long (25.68 m), Burr Truss arch bridge with a tarred metal roof. Erected in 1865, it crosses the North Branch of Roaring Creek, and is one of twenty-eight historic covered bridges in Columbia and Montour Counties.
