= St. Bridget Township, Kansas =

Township in Marshall County, Kansas, U.S.

St. Bridget Township
- Township
- Interactive map of St. Bridget Township
- Coordinates: 39.949799°N 96.278666°W
- Country: United States
- State: Kansas
- County: Marshall

Area
  - Total: 35.468 sq mi (91.86 km^{2})
  - Land: 35.439 sq mi (91.79 km^{2})
  - Water: 0.029 sq mi (0.075 km^{2}) 0.08%

Population (2020)
  - Total: 132
  - Density: 3.72/sq mi (1.44/km^{2})
- Time zone: UTC-6 (CST)
  - Summer (DST): UTC-5 (CDT)
- Area code: 785

St. Bridget Township is a township in Marshall County, Kansas, United States. As of the 2020 census, its population was 132.

== Geography ==
St. Bridget Township covers an area of 35.468 square miles (91.86 square kilometers).

=== Communities ===
- part of Summerfield

=== Adjacent townships ===
- Clear Creek Township, Nemaha County (east)
- Marion Township, Nemaha County (southeast)
- Murray Township, Marshall County (south)
- Guittard Township, Marshall County (southwest)
- Richland Township, Marshall County (west)

=== Major highways ===
- K-99
