= Blue Rapids City Township, Kansas =

Township in Marshall County, Kansas, U.S.

Blue Rapids City Township
- Township
- Interactive map of Blue Rapids City Township
- Coordinates: 39.700255°N 96.63761°W
- Country: United States
- State: Kansas
- County: Marshall

Area
  - Total: 35.984 sq mi (93.20 km^{2})
  - Land: 35.522 sq mi (92.00 km^{2})
  - Water: 0.462 sq mi (1.20 km^{2}) 1.28%

Population (2020)
  - Total: 1,017
  - Density: 28.63/sq mi (11.05/km^{2})
- Time zone: UTC-6 (CST)
  - Summer (DST): UTC-5 (CDT)
- Area code: 785

Blue Rapids City Township is a township in Marshall County, Kansas, United States. As of the 2020 census, its population was 1,017.

== Geography ==
Blue Rapids City Township covers an area of 35.984 square miles (93.20 square kilometers). The Big Blue River and Little Blue River flow through it.

=== Communities ===
- Blue Rapids

=== Adjacent townships ===
- Elm Creek Township, Marshall County (north)
- Center Township, Marshall County (northeast)
- Wells Township, Marshall County (east)
- Bigelow Township, Marshall County (southeast)
- Blue Rapids Township, Marshall County (south)
- Cottage Hill Township, Marshall County (southwest)
- Waterville Township, Marshall County (west)
- Walnut Township, Marshall County (northwest)

=== Major highways ===
- US-77
- K-9
