= Bigelow Township, Kansas =

Township in Marshall County, Kansas, U.S.

Bigelow Township
- Township
- Interactive map of Bigelow Township
- Coordinates: 39.608324°N 96.530606°W
- Country: United States
- State: Kansas
- County: Marshall

Area
  - Total: 37.777 sq mi (97.84 km^{2})
  - Land: 37.24 sq mi (96.5 km^{2})
  - Water: 0.537 sq mi (1.39 km^{2}) 1.42%

Population (2020)
  - Total: 59
  - Density: 1.6/sq mi (0.61/km^{2})
- Time zone: UTC-6 (CST)
  - Summer (DST): UTC-5 (CDT)
- Area code: 785

Bigelow Township is a township in Marshall County, Kansas, United States. As of the 2020 census, its population was 59.

== Geography ==
Bigelow Township covers an area of 37.777 square miles (97.84 square kilometers). The Big Blue River flows through it.

=== Adjacent townships ===
- Wells Township, Marshall County (north)
- Vermillion Township, Marshall County (northeast)
- Clear Fork Township, Marshall County (east)
- Clear Creek Township, Pottawatomie County (southeast)
- Spring Creek Township, Pottawatomie County (south)
- Sweden Creek Township, Riley County (southwest)
- Blue Rapids Township, Marshall County (west)
- Blue Rapids City Township, Marshall County (northwest)
