= Franklin Township, Marshall County, Kansas =

Township in Marshall County, Kansas, U.S.

Franklin Township
- Township
- Interactive map of Franklin Township
- Coordinates: 39.871147°N 96.523992°W
- Country: United States
- State: Kansas
- County: Marshall

Area
  - Total: 37.831 sq mi (97.98 km^{2})
  - Land: 37.744 sq mi (97.76 km^{2})
  - Water: 0.087 sq mi (0.23 km^{2}) 0.23%

Population (2020)
  - Total: 273
  - Density: 7.23/sq mi (2.79/km^{2})
- Time zone: UTC-6 (CST)
  - Summer (DST): UTC-5 (CDT)
- Area code: 785

Franklin Township is a township in Marshall County, Kansas, United States. As of the 2020 census, its population was 273.

== Geography ==
Franklin Township covers an area of 37.831 square miles (97.98 square kilometers).

=== Communities ===
- Home

=== Adjacent townships ===
- Balderson Township, Marshall County (north)
- Richland Township, Marshall County (northeast)
- Guittard Township, Marshall County (east)
- Rock Township, Marshall County (southeast)
- Center Township, Marshall County (south)
- Elm Creek Township, Marshall County (southwest)
- Marysville Township, Marshall County (west)
- Oketo Township, Marshall County (northwest)

=== Major highways ===
- US-36
