= Independence Township, Washington County, Kansas =

Township in Washington County, Kansas, U.S.

Independence Township
- Township
- Location within Washington County
- Coordinates: 39.95676°N 96.860556°W
- Country: United States
- State: Kansas
- County: Washington

Government
  - District 1 Commissioner: Scott Zabokrtsky

Area
  - Total: 35.764 sq mi (92.63 km^{2})
  - Land: 35.598 sq mi (92.20 km^{2})
  - Water: 0.166 sq mi (0.43 km^{2}) 0.46%

Population (2020)
  - Total: 101
  - Density: 2.84/sq mi (1.10/km^{2})
- Time zone: UTC-6 (CST)
  - Summer (DST): UTC-5 (CDT)
- Area code: 785
- GNIS feature ID: 472650

Independence Township is a township in Washington County, Kansas, United States. As of the 2020 census, its population was 101.

== History ==
Independence Township was created from part of Hanover Township.

== Geography ==
Independence Township covers an area of 35.764 square miles (92.63 km^{2}), 0.46% of it water. The Little Blue River flows through it, as well as Horseshoe Creek.

=== Communities ===
- part of Lanham

=== Adjacent townships ===
Glenwood Township, Gage County, Nebraska
Jefferson County, Nebraska	northwest	north
Franklin Township, Washington County	west	self	east	Herkimer Township, Marshall County
Charleston Township, Washington County	southwest	south	southeast	Logan Township, Marshall County
Hanover Township, Washington County

== Transportation ==
=== Major highways ===
- K-148

== Demographics ==
As of the 2020 census, the township had a population of 101, giving a population density of 2.84 people per square mile (1.10 people/km^{2}). The racial makeup of the township was 99.0% White and 1.0% from two or more races. Hispanics or Latinos of any race were 1.0% of the population.

The 2020–2024 American Community Survey estimated that the township contained 25 households and 25 housing units.
