= Hanover Township, Washington County, Kansas =

Township in Washington County, Kansas, U.S.

Hanover Township
- Township
- Location within Washington County
- Coordinates: 39.871605°N 96.859489°W
- Country: United States
- State: Kansas
- County: Washington
- Established: 1870

Government
  - District 1 Commissioner: Scott Zabokrtsky

Area
  - Total: 36.07 sq mi (93.4 km^{2})
  - Land: 35.698 sq mi (92.46 km^{2})
  - Water: 0.372 sq mi (0.96 km^{2}) 1.03%

Population (2020)
  - Total: 913
  - Density: 25.6/sq mi (9.87/km^{2})
- Time zone: UTC-6 (CST)
  - Summer (DST): UTC-5 (CDT)
- Area code: 785
- GNIS feature ID: 472653

Hanover Township is a township in Washington County, Kansas, United States. As of the 2020 census, its population was 913.

== History ==
Hanover Township was established in 1870 from part of Washington Township. In 1874, Charleston Township was created from part of Hanover Township. Later, Independence Township would be created from part of Hanover Township.

== Geography ==
Hanover Township covers an area of 36.07 square miles (93.4 km^{2}), 1.03% of it water. The Little Blue River flows through it, as well as Lane Branch, Cedar Creek, and Cottonwood Creek.

=== Communities ===
- Hanover

=== Adjacent townships ===
Independence Township, Washington County
Franklin Township, Washington County	northwest	north	northeast	Herkimer Township, Marshall County
Charleston Township, Washington County	west	self	east	Logan Township, Marshall County
Logan Township, Washington County	southwest	south	southeast	Walnut Township, Marshall County
Little Blue Township, Washington County

== Transportation ==
=== Major highways ===
- US-36
- K-148

== Demographics ==
As of the 2020 census, the township had a population of 913, giving a population density of 25.6 people per square mile (9.9 people/km^{2}). The racial makeup of the township was 96.7% White, 0.4% Black or African American, 0.1% Asian, 0.1% Pacific Islander, 0.5% from some other race, and 2.1% from two or more races. Hispanics or Latinos of any race were 1.9% of the population.

The 2020–2024 American Community Survey estimated that the township contained 387 households and 404 housing units.
