= Blue Rapids Township, Kansas =

Township in Marshall County, Kansas, U.S.

Blue Rapids Township
- Township
- Interactive map of Blue Rapids Township
- Coordinates: 39.610855°N 96.634762°W
- Country: United States
- State: Kansas
- County: Marshall

Area
  - Total: 35.947 sq mi (93.10 km^{2})
  - Land: 35.826 sq mi (92.79 km^{2})
  - Water: 0.121 sq mi (0.31 km^{2}) 0.34%

Population (2020)
  - Total: 89
  - Density: 2.5/sq mi (0.96/km^{2})
- Time zone: UTC-6 (CST)
  - Summer (DST): UTC-5 (CDT)
- Area code: 785

Blue Rapids Township is a township in Marshall County, Kansas, United States. As of the 2020 census, its population was 89.

== Geography ==
Bigelow Township covers an area of 35.947 square miles (93.10 square kilometers). The Big Blue River flows through it.

=== Adjacent townships ===
- Blue Rapids City Township, Marshall County (north)
- Wells Township, Marshall County (northeast)
- Bigelow Township, Marshall County (east)
- Spring Creek Township, Pottawatomie County (southeast)
- Sweden Creek Township, Riley County (south)
- Cottage Hill Township, Marshall County (west)
- Waterville Township, Marshall County (northwest)
