= Coleman Township, Kansas =

Township in Washington County, Kansas, U.S.

Coleman Township
- Township
- Location within Washington County
- Coordinates: 39.777864°N 97.1896°W
- Country: United States
- State: Kansas
- County: Washington

Government
  - District 3 Commissioner: Raleigh Ordoyne

Area
  - Total: 36.255 sq mi (93.90 km^{2})
  - Land: 36.147 sq mi (93.62 km^{2})
  - Water: 0.108 sq mi (0.28 km^{2}) 0.30%

Population (2020)
  - Total: 52
  - Density: 1.4/sq mi (0.56/km^{2})
- Time zone: UTC-6 (CST)
  - Summer (DST): UTC-5 (CDT)
- Area code: 785
- GNIS feature ID: 472860

Coleman Township is a township in Washington County, Kansas, United States. As of the 2020 census, its population was 52.

== History ==
Coleman Township was created from parts of Mill Creek Township, Washington Township, Sherman Township, and Strawberry Township. Coleman Township is home to the now-extinct town of Throop. Throop's post office was open from 1890 to 1903 and it had a population of 28 in 1910.

== Geography ==
Coleman Township covers an area of 36.255 square miles (93.90 km^{2}), 0.3% of it water.

=== Adjacent townships ===
Mill Creek Township, Washington County
Haddam Township, Washington County	northwest	north	northeast	Farmington Township, Washington County
Grant Township, Washington County	west	self	east	Washington Township, Washington County
Brantford Township, Washington County	southwest	south	southeast	Linn Township, Washington County
Strawberry Township, Washington County

== Transportation ==
=== Major highways ===
- US-36
- K-15

== Demographics ==
As of the 2020 census, the township had a population of 52, giving a population density of 1.4 people per square mile (0.54 people/km^{2}). The racial makeup of the township was 96.2% White and 3.8% from two or more races. Hispanics or Latinos of any race were 1.9% of the population.

The 2020–2024 American Community Survey estimated that the township contained 19 households and 19 housing units.
