= Franklin Township, Dent County, Missouri =

Township in Dent County, Missouri, U.S.

Coordinates: 37.5422°N 91.5058°W

Franklin Township is an inactive township in Dent County, in the U.S. state of Missouri.

Franklin Township was established in 1866, taking its name from Benjamin Franklin.
