= Franklin Township, Columbia County, Pennsylvania =

Township in Pennsylvania, US

Coordinates: 40°55′00″N 76°28′59″W

- Township
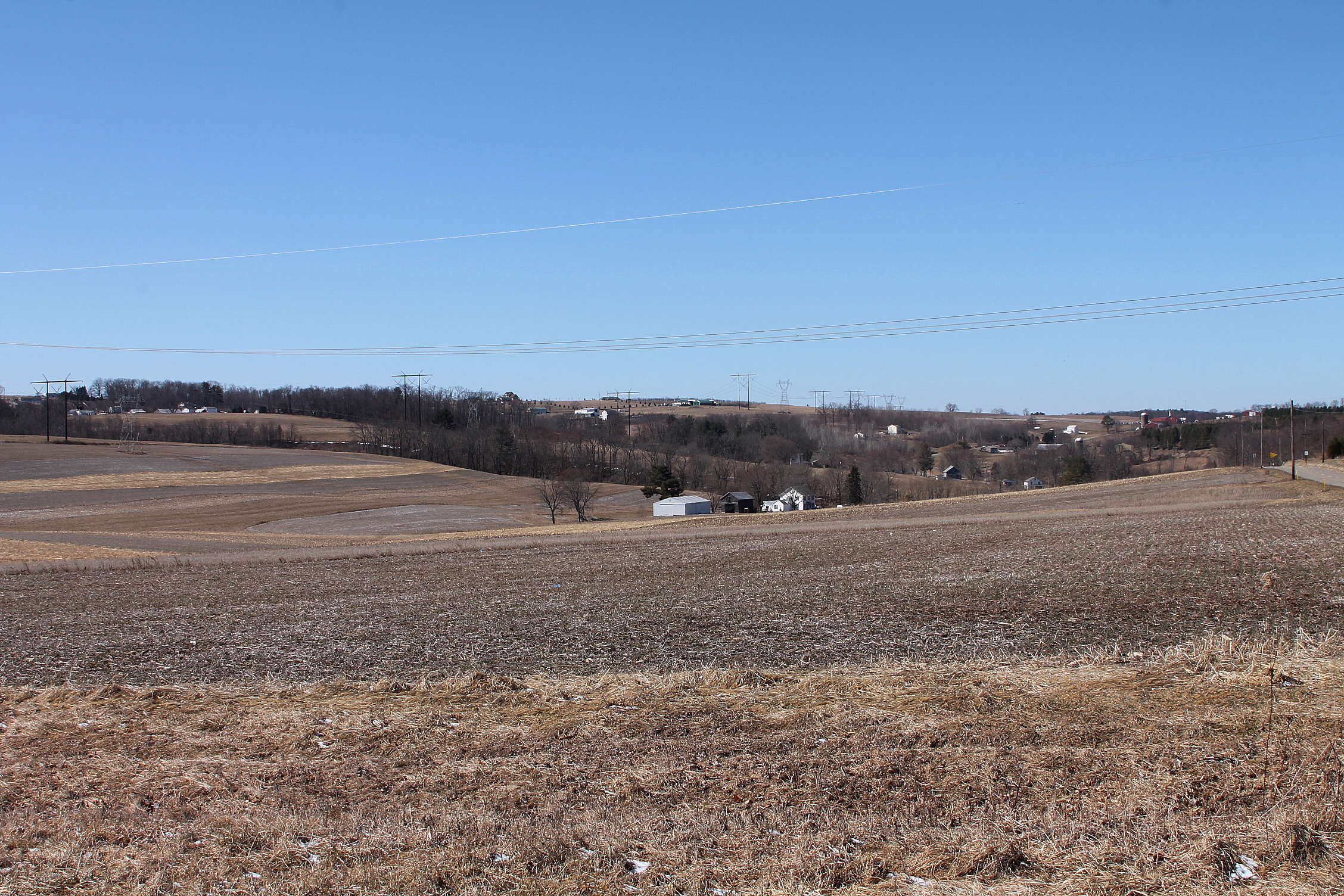
- Scenery of Franklin Township from State Route 3012

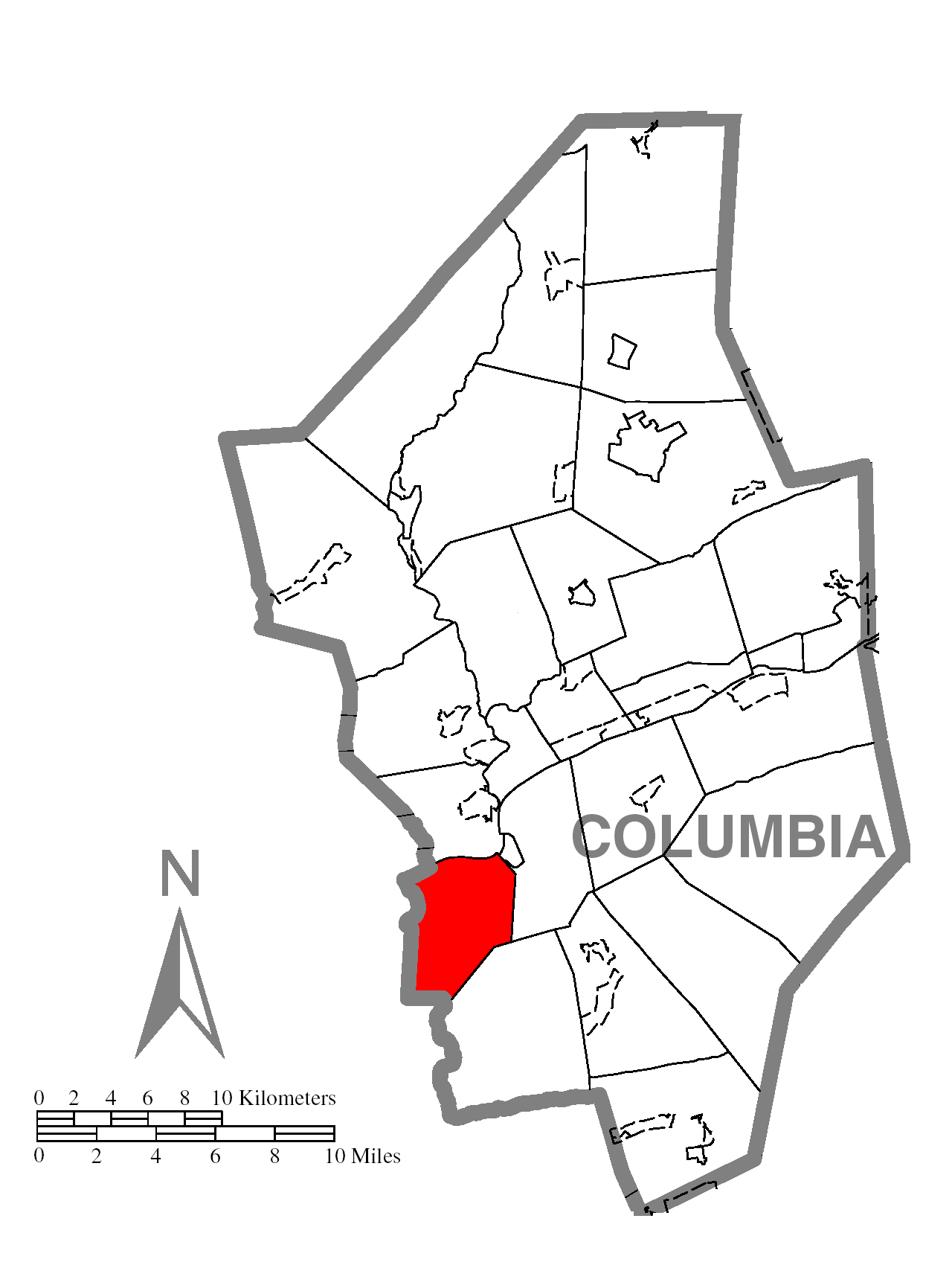
- Map of Columbia County, Pennsylvania highlighting Franklin Township

- Map of Columbia County, Pennsylvania
- Country: United States
- State: Pennsylvania
- County: Columbia
- Settled: 1783
- Incorporated: 1843

Area
  - Total: 13.53 sq mi (35.04 km^{2})
  - Land: 13.09 sq mi (33.90 km^{2})
  - Water: 0.44 sq mi (1.14 km^{2})

Population (2020)
  - Total: 552 ▼
  - Estimate (2021): 554
  - Density: 45/sq mi (17.2/km^{2})
- Time zone: UTC-5 (Eastern (EST))
  - Summer (DST): UTC-4 (EDT)
- Area code: 570
- FIPS code: 42-037-27384
- Website: https://franklintwpcc.com/

Franklin Township is a township in Columbia County, Pennsylvania. It is part of Northeastern Pennsylvania. The population was 552 at the 2020 census.

== History ==
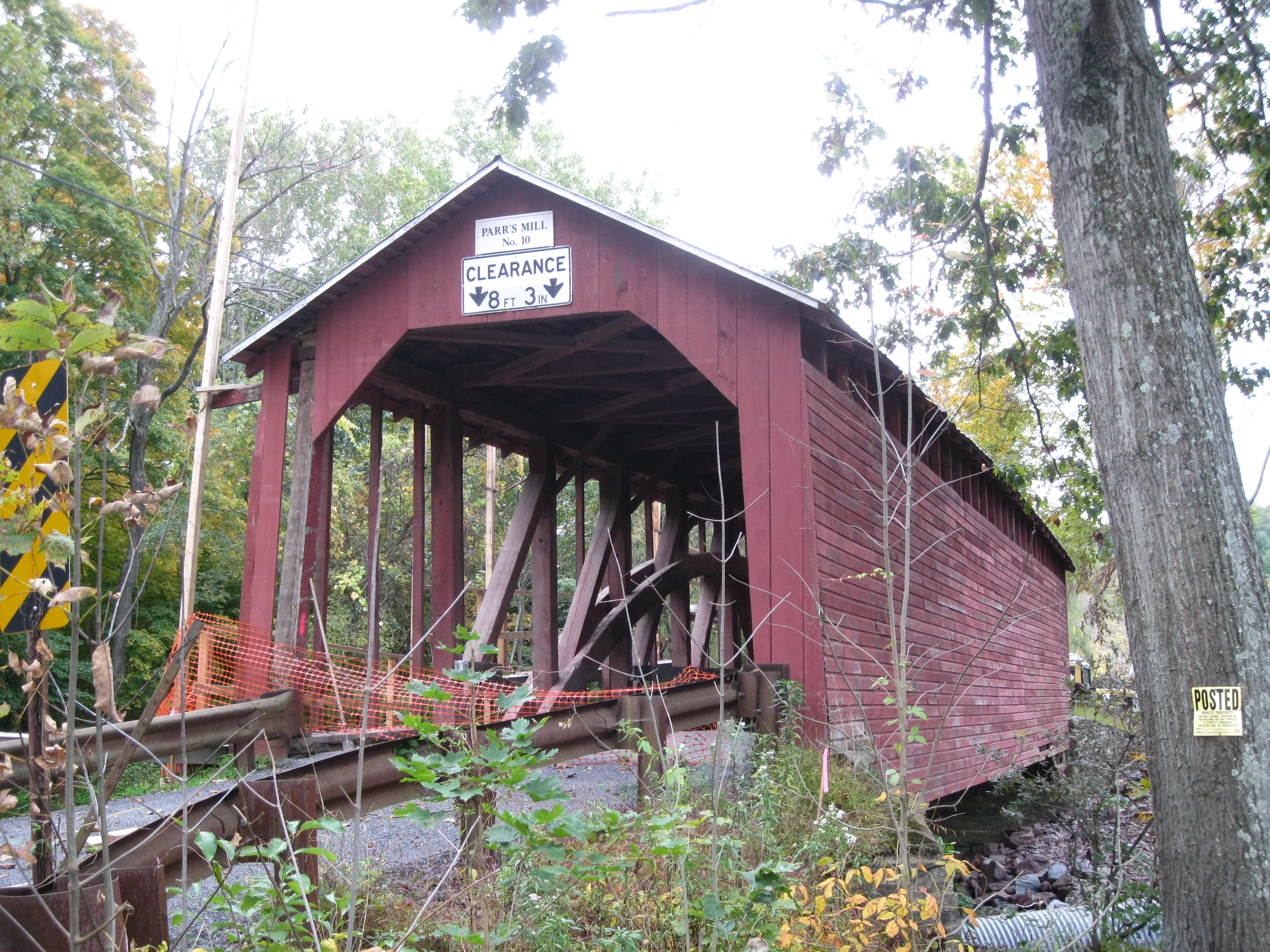
Parr's Mill Covered Bridge No. 10

The Parr's Mill Covered Bridge No. 10, Riegel Covered Bridge No. 6, and Rohrbach Covered Bridge No. 24 was listed on the National Register of Historic Places in 1979.

== Geography ==
Franklin Township is in southwestern Columbia County, bordered by Montour County to the west and Northumberland County to the south. The Susquehanna River forms the northern border, and Roaring Creek, its tributary, crosses the township and forms part of its western boundary.

According to the U.S. Census Bureau, the township has a total area of 13.5 square miles (35.0 km^{2}), of which 13.1 square miles (33.9 km^{2}) is land and 0.42 square miles (1.1 km^{2}), or 3.25%, is water.

== Demographics ==
Historical population
Census	Pop.	Note	%±
2010	595		—
2020	552		−7.2%
2021 (est.)	554		0.4%
U.S. Decennial Census

As of the census of 2000, there were 597 people, 231 households, and 181 families residing in the township. The population density was 45.3 inhabitants per square mile (17.5/km^{2}). There were 267 housing units at an average density of 20.3 units per square mile (7.8 units/km^{2}). The racial makeup of the township was 99.66% White, 0.34% from other races. Hispanic or Latino of any race were 0.34% of the population.

There were 231 households, out of which 33.8% had children under the age of 18 living with them, 65.8% were married couples living together, 6.5% had a female householder with no husband present, and 21.6% were non-families. 19.0% of all households were made up of individuals, and 6.9% had someone living alone who was 65 years of age or older. The average household size was 2.58 and the average family size was 2.90.

In the township the population was spread out, with 23.8% under the age of 18, 7.0% from 18 to 24, 29.6% from 25 to 44, 24.1% from 45 to 64, and 15.4% who were 65 years of age or older. The median age was 40 years. For every 100 females, there were 111.0 males. For every 100 females age 18 and over, there were 109.7 males.

The median income for a household in the township was $41,161, and the median income for a family was $42,750. Males had a median income of $29,464 versus $26,875 for females. The per capita income for the township was $17,096. About 4.5% of families and 7.2% of the population were below the poverty line, including 8.2% of those under age 18 and 3.9% of those age 65 or over.
