= Franklin Township, Miller County, Missouri =

Township in Miller County, Missouri, U.S.

Coordinates: 38.2931°N 92.6278°W

Franklin Township is an inactive township in Miller County, in the U.S. state of Missouri.

Franklin Township was established in 1860, and named after the local Franklin family.
