= Walnut Township, Marshall County, Kansas =

Township in Marshall County, Kansas, U.S.

Walnut Township
- Township
- Interactive map of Walnut Township
- Coordinates: 39.790997°N 96.74588°W
- Country: United States
- State: Kansas
- County: Marshall

Area
  - Total: 35.918 sq mi (93.03 km^{2})
  - Land: 35.84 sq mi (92.8 km^{2})
  - Water: 0.078 sq mi (0.20 km^{2}) 0.22%

Population (2020)
  - Total: 101
  - Density: 2.82/sq mi (1.09/km^{2})
- Time zone: UTC-6 (CST)
  - Summer (DST): UTC-5 (CDT)
- Area code: 785

Walnut Township is a township in Marshall County, Kansas, United States. As of the 2020 census, its population was 101.

== Geography ==
Walnut Township covers an area of 35.918 square miles (93.03 square kilometers).

=== Adjacent townships ===
- Logan Township, Marshall County (north)
- Marysville Township, Marshall County (northeast)
- Elm Creek Township, Marshall County (east)
- Blue Rapids City Township, Marshall County (southeast)
- Waterville Township, Marshall County (south)
- Barnes Township, Washington County (southwest)
- Little Blue Township, Washington County (west)
- Hanover Township, Washington County (northwest)
