= Highland Township, Washington County, Kansas =

Township in Washington County, Kansas, U.S.

Highland Township
- Township
- Location within Washington County
- Coordinates: 39.944707°N 97.090778°W
- Country: United States
- State: Kansas
- County: Washington

Government
  - District 2 Commissioner: Arthur Schottel

Area
  - Total: 35.744 sq mi (92.58 km^{2})
  - Land: 35.508 sq mi (91.97 km^{2})
  - Water: 0.236 sq mi (0.61 km^{2}) 0.66%

Population (2020)
  - Total: 24
  - Density: 0.68/sq mi (0.26/km^{2})
- Time zone: UTC-6 (CST)
  - Summer (DST): UTC-5 (CDT)
- Area code: 785
- GNIS feature ID: 472627

Highland Township is a township in Washington County, Kansas, United States. As of the 2020 census, its population was 24.

== History ==
Highland Township was created from part of Hollenberg Township, which no longer exists.

== Geography ==
Highland Township covers an area of 35.744 square miles (92.58 km^{2}), 0.66% of it water. Washington County State Lake and Washington County State Park both lie within the township.

=== Adjacent townships ===
Jefferson County, Nebraska
| | | north |
| Lowe Township, Washington County | west | self | east | Franklin Township, Washington County |
| Mill Creek Township, Washington County | southwest | south | southeast | Charleston Township, Washington County |
Farmington Township, Washington County

== Demographics ==
As of the 2020 census, the township had a population of 24, giving a population density of 0.68 people per square mile (0.26 people/km^{2}). The racial makeup of the township was 95.8% White and 4.2% from two or more races.

The 2020–2024 American Community Survey estimated that the township contained 7 households and 7 housing units.
