= Franklin Township, Rowan County, North Carolina =

Township in Rowan County, North Carolina, U.S.

Coordinates: 35°42′34″N 80°30′03″W

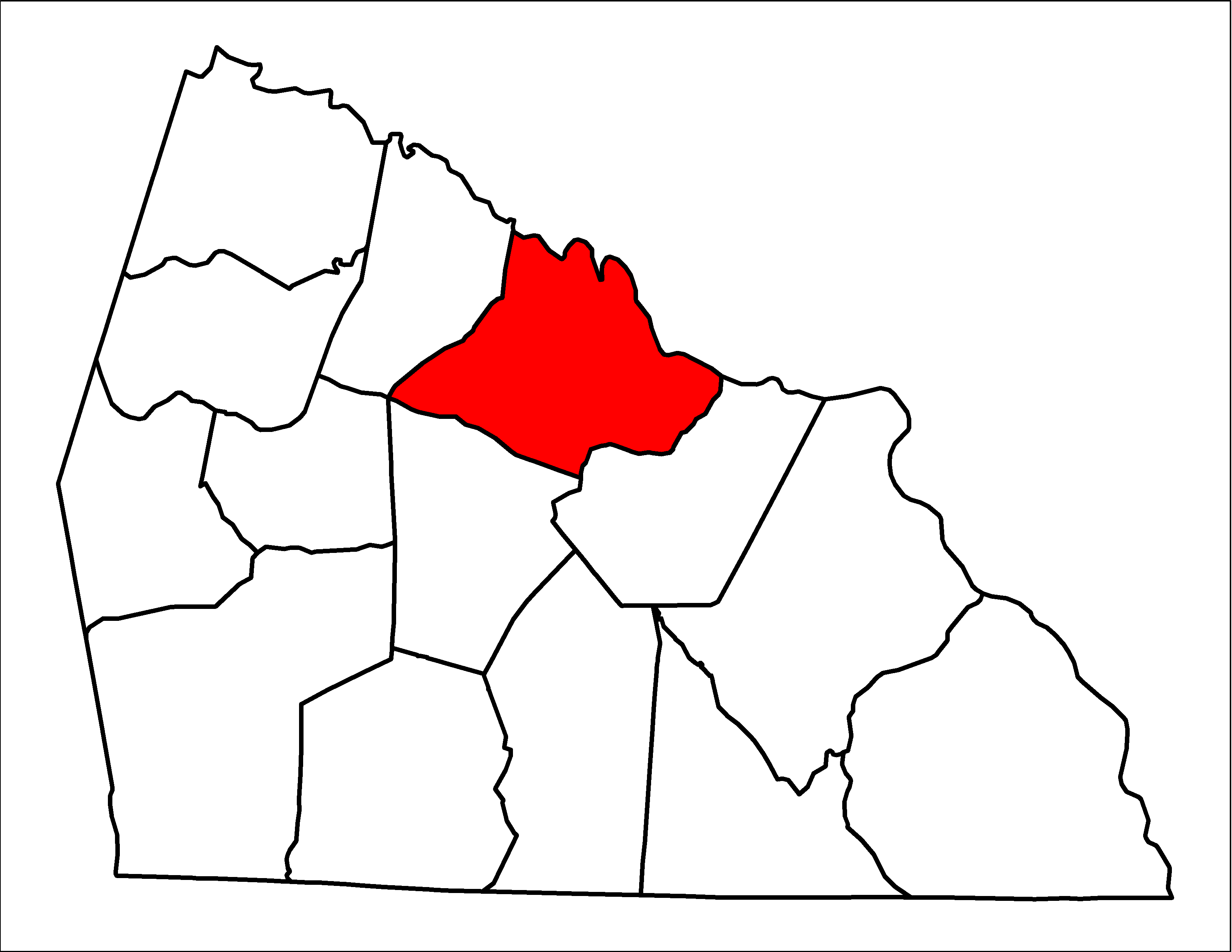
Location of Franklin Township in Rowan County, N.C.

Franklin Township is one of fourteen townships in Rowan County, North Carolina, United States. The township had a population of 12,301 according to the 2000 census.

Geographically, Franklin Township occupies 37.52 square miles (97.2 km^{2}) in northern Rowan County. The only incorporated municipality located in Franklin Township is a portion of the city of Salisbury, the county seat of Rowan County.

Franklin Township Fire Department provides fire suppression, prevention, and emergency medical care for its 12,000 plus citizens. The fire department currently operates out of two stations, with a complement of four pumper/tankers, two tanker trucks, one rescue, one brush truck and one squad truck. The department in 2018 ran approximately 600 emergency calls. Franklin Township VFD has approximately 30 volunteer firefighters, with many holding either North Carolina Medical Responder or Emergency Medical Technician certification. In 2008, the department began having a paid staff of two firefighters working weekday's to help the department maintain equipment, ensure a timely response to calls, and provide services during the volunteers normal working hours.
