= Waterville Township, Kansas =

Township in Marshall County, Kansas, U.S.

Waterville Township
- Township
- Interactive map of Waterville Township
- Coordinates: 39.700219°N 96.746622°W
- Country: United States
- State: Kansas
- County: Marshall

Area
  - Total: 35.902 sq mi (92.99 km^{2})
  - Land: 35.514 sq mi (91.98 km^{2})
  - Water: 0.388 sq mi (1.00 km^{2}) 1.08%

Population (2020)
  - Total: 782
  - Density: 22.0/sq mi (8.50/km^{2})
- Time zone: UTC-6 (CST)
  - Summer (DST): UTC-5 (CDT)
- Area code: 785

Waterville Township is a township in Marshall County, Kansas, United States. As of the 2020 census, its population was 782.

== Geography ==
Waterville Township covers an area of 35.902 square miles (92.99 square kilometers). The Little Blue River and Big Blue River flow through it.

=== Communities ===
- Waterville

=== Adjacent townships ===
- Walnut Township, Marshall County (north)
- Elm Creek Township, Marshall County (northeast)
- Blue Rapids City Township, Marshall County (east)
- Blue Rapids Township, Marshall County (southeast)
- Cottage Hill Township, Marshall County (south)
- Lincoln Township, Washington County (southwest)
- Barnes Township, Washington County (west)
- Little Blue Township, Washington County (northwest)

=== Major highways ===
- US-77
- K-9
