= Farmington Township, Washington County, Kansas =

Township in Washington County, Kansas, U.S.

Farmington Township
- Township
- Location within Washington County
- Coordinates: 39.86479°N 97.082313°W
- Country: United States
- State: Kansas
- County: Washington

Government
  - District 2 Commissioner: Arthur Schottel

Area
  - Total: 36.222 sq mi (93.81 km^{2})
  - Land: 36.121 sq mi (93.55 km^{2})
  - Water: 0.101 sq mi (0.26 km^{2}) 0.28%

Population (2020)
  - Total: 172
  - Density: 4.76/sq mi (1.84/km^{2})
- Time zone: UTC-6 (CST)
  - Summer (DST): UTC-5 (CDT)
- Area code: 785
- GNIS feature ID: 472628

Farmington Township is a township in Washington County, Kansas, United States. As of the 2020 census, its population was 172.

== History ==
Farmington Township was created from parts of Washington Township and Hollenberg Township, which no longer exists. In June of 1890, a 25-thousand-year-old meteorite landed in the township. The fireball was seen by thousands and a small earthquake was felt upon impact. It was likely thought to be an Apollo asteroid.

== Geography ==
Farmington Township covers an area of 36.222 square miles (93.81 km^{2}), 0.28% of it water.

=== Adjacent townships ===
Highland Township, Washington County
Lowe Township, Washington County	northwest	north	northeast	Franklin Township, Washington County
Mill Creek Township, Washington County	west	self	east	Charleston Township, Washington County
Coleman Township, Washington County	southwest	south	southeast	Logan Township, Washington County
Washington Township, Washington County

== Transportation ==
=== Major highways ===
- US-36
- K-15

== Demographics ==
As of the 2020 census, the township had a population of 172, giving a population density of 4.76 people per square mile (1.84 people/km^{2}). The racial makeup of the township was 94.8% White, 0.6% Asian, 0.6% from some other race, and 4.1% from two or more races. Hispanics or Latinos of any race were 1.7% of the population.

The 2020–2024 American Community Survey estimated that the township contained 91 households and 108 housing units.
