= Franklin Township, Washington County, Kansas =

Township in Washington County, Kansas, U.S.

Franklin Township
- Township
- Location within Washington County
- Coordinates: 39.958316°N 96.964649°W
- Country: United States
- State: Kansas
- County: Washington

Government
  - District 2 Commissioner: Arthur Schottel

Area
  - Total: 35.759 sq mi (92.62 km^{2})
  - Land: 35.39 sq mi (91.7 km^{2})
  - Water: 0.369 sq mi (0.96 km^{2}) 1.03%

Population (2020)
  - Total: 84
  - Density: 2.4/sq mi (0.92/km^{2})
- Time zone: UTC-6 (CST)
  - Summer (DST): UTC-5 (CDT)
- Area code: 785
- GNIS feature ID: 472638

Franklin Township is a township in Washington County, Kansas, United States. As of the 2020 census, its population was 84.

== History ==
Franklin Township was created from part of Hollenberg Township, which no longer exists.

== Geography ==
Franklin Township covers an area of 35.759 square miles (92.62 km^{2}), 1.03% of it water. The Little Blue River flows through it, as well as Joy Creek and Mill Creek.

=== Communities ===
- Hollenberg

=== Adjacent townships ===
Jefferson County, Nebraska
		north
Highland Township, Washington County	west	self	east	Independence Township, Washington County
Farmington Township, Washington County	southwest	south	southeast	Hanover Township, Washington County
Charleston Township, Washington County

== Demographics ==
As of the 2020 census, the township had a population of 84, giving a population density of 2.4 people per square mile (0.93 people/km^{2}). The racial makeup of the township was 97.6% White, 1.2% Native American, and 1.2% from two or more races. Hispanics or Latinos of any race were 2.4% of the population.

The 2020–2024 American Community Survey estimated that the township contained 79 households and 90 housing units.
