= Franklin Township, Butler County, Nebraska =

Franklin Township
- Township
- Location in Butler County
- Coordinates: 41°15′51″N 097°05′08″W
- Country: United States
- State: Nebraska
- County: Butler

Area
  - Total: 34.37 sq mi (89.01 km^{2})
  - Land: 34 sq mi (89 km^{2})
  - Water: 0.0077 sq mi (0.02 km^{2}) 0.02%
- Elevation: 1,644 ft (501 m)

Population (2020)
  - Total: 213
  - Density: 6.2/sq mi (2.4/km^{2})
- GNIS feature ID: 0838007

Franklin Township is one of seventeen townships in Butler County, Nebraska, United States. The population was 213 at the 2020 census. A 2021 estimate placed the township's population at 215.
