= Cottage Hill Township, Kansas =

Township in Marshall County, Kansas, U.S.

Cottage Hill Township
- Township
- Interactive map of Cottage Hill Township
- Coordinates: 39.602772°N 96.759441°W
- Country: United States
- State: Kansas
- County: Marshall

Area
  - Total: 36.02 sq mi (93.3 km^{2})
  - Land: 35.935 sq mi (93.07 km^{2})
  - Water: 0.085 sq mi (0.22 km^{2}) 0.24%

Population (2020)
  - Total: 131
  - Density: 3.65/sq mi (1.41/km^{2})
- Time zone: UTC-6 (CST)
  - Summer (DST): UTC-5 (CDT)
- Area code: 785

Cottage Hill Township is a township in Marshall County, Kansas, United States. As of the 2020 census, its population was 131.

== Geography ==
Cottage Hill Township covers an area of 36.02 square miles (93.3 square kilometers).

=== Adjacent townships ===
- Waterville Township, Marshall County (north)
- Blue Rapids City Township, Marshall County (northeast)
- Blue Rapids Township, Marshall County (east)
- Swede Creek Township, Riley County (south)
- Lincoln Township, Washington County (west)
- Barnes Township, Washington County (northwest)

=== Major highways ===
- US-77
