= Franklin Township, Fillmore County, Nebraska =

Franklin Township
- Township
- Location in Fillmore County
- Coordinates: 40°23′42″N 097°25′35″W
- Country: United States
- State: Nebraska
- County: Fillmore

Area
  - Total: 36.05 sq mi (93.36 km^{2})
  - Land: 36.04 sq mi (93.34 km^{2})
  - Water: 0.0077 sq mi (0.02 km^{2}) 0.02%
- Elevation: 1,552 ft (473 m)

Population (2020)
  - Total: 189 ▼
  - Density: 5.24/sq mi (2.02/km^{2})
- GNIS feature ID: 0838008

Franklin Township is one of fifteen townships in Fillmore County, Nebraska, United States. The population was 189 at the 2020 census.

The village of Ohiowa lies within the township.
