= Lincoln Township, Washington County, Kansas =

Township in Washington County, Kansas, U.S.

Lincoln Township
- Township
- Location within Washington County
- Coordinates: 39.602747°N 96.85347°W
- Country: United States
- State: Kansas
- County: Washington
- Established: 1868

Government
  - District 1 Commissioner: Scott Zabokrtsky

Area
  - Total: 35.985 sq mi (93.20 km^{2})
  - Land: 35.869 sq mi (92.90 km^{2})
  - Water: 0.116 sq mi (0.30 km^{2}) 0.32%

Population (2020)
  - Total: 61
  - Density: 1.7/sq mi (0.66/km^{2})
- Time zone: UTC-6 (CST)
  - Summer (DST): UTC-5 (CDT)
- Area code: 785
- GNIS feature ID: 473144

Lincoln Township is a township in Washington County, Kansas, United States. As of the 2020 census, its population was 61.

== History ==
Lincoln Township was created in 1868. In 1870, Little Blue Township was created from part of Lincoln Township. Lincoln Township is home to two now-extinct towns: Chepstow and Parallel. Chepstow was located in the Coon Creek valley and had a population of 25 in 1910. Its post office was open from 1870 to 1872 and 1874 to 1905. All that remains in the present day is the cemetery. Parallel was established in 1863 and was located near the border with Riley County. Its post office was open from 1863 to 1905, and it was moved across the county line several times during its operation. Its population was 30 in 1884, but dropped to 15 by 1900.

== Geography ==
Lincoln Township covers an area of 35.985 square miles (93.20 km^{2}), 0.32% of it water. The north fork of Fancy Creek, Sulphur Creek, and Coon Creek flow through it.

=== Adjacent townships ===
Barnes Township, Washington County
Greenleaf Township, Washington County	northwest	north	northeast	Waterville Township, Marshall County
Kimeo Township, Washington County	west	self	east	Cottage Hill Township, Marshall County
		south	southeast	Swede Creek Township, Riley County
May Day Township, Riley County

== Demographics ==
As of the 2020 census, the township had a population of 61, giving a population density of 1.7 people per square mile (0.66 people/km^{2}). The racial makeup of the township was 98.4% White and 1.6% from some other race. Hispanics or Latinos of any race were 1.6% of the population.

The 2020–2024 American Community Survey estimated that the township contained 14 households and 14 housing units.
