= National Register of Historic Places listings in Marshall County, Kansas =

Location of Marshall County in Kansas

This is a list of the National Register of Historic Places listings in Marshall County, Kansas.

This is intended to be a complete list of the properties and districts on the National Register of Historic Places in Marshall County, Kansas, United States. The locations of National Register properties and districts for which the latitude and longitude coordinates are included below, may be seen in a map.

There are 23 properties and districts listed on the National Register in the county.

This National Park Service list is complete through NPS recent listings posted October 2, 2026.

== Current listings ==
	Name on the Register	Image	Date listed	Location	City or town	Description
1	Alcove Springs	Alcove Springs	February 23, 1972 (#72000513)	4 miles (6.4 km) north of Blue Rapids; E. River Rd; 39°44′56″N 96°40′35″W	Blue Rapids	Boundary increase September 25, 2013
2	Barrett Schoolhouse	Barrett Schoolhouse	March 14, 1973 (#73000766)	4 miles (6.4 km) southwest of Frankfort on K-99; 39°39′59″N 96°27′06″W	Frankfort	
3	Blue Rapids Library	Blue Rapids Library	March 17, 1972 (#72000514)	Eastern side of the public square 39°40′55″N 96°39′29″W	Blue Rapids	
4	Frankfort School	Frankfort School	December 27, 1972 (#72000515)	400 Locust St. 39°42′17″N 96°25′01″W	Frankfort	
5	Perry Hutchinson House	Perry Hutchinson House	April 13, 1972 (#72000516)	1 mile (1.6 km) northwest of Marysville on U.S. Route 77; 39°51′02″N 96°40′02″W	Marysville	
6	Koester Block Historic District	Koester Block Historic District	December 5, 1980 (#80001469)	Between 9th, 10th, Elm, and Broadway Sts. 39°50′29″N 96°38′44″W	Marysville	
7	Charles Koester House	Charles Koester House	May 12, 1975 (#75000715)	919 Broadway; 39°50′29″N 96°38′44″W	Marysville	
8	Marshall County Courthouse	Marshall County Courthouse	November 5, 1974 (#74000843)	1207 Broadway; 39°50′32″N 96°38′31″W	Marysville	
9	Marysville Downtown Historic District		October 5, 2026 (#100013523)	5th Street to 11th Street along Broadway, from 6th to 9th Streets on the north side of Center Street (Hwy 36), and from 8th to 10th Streets on both sides of Elm Street; 39°50′30″N 96°38′53″W	Marysville	
10	Marysville High School-Junior High School Complex	Marysville High School-Junior High School Complex	January 2, 2013 (#12001120)	1011-1111 Walnut St. 39°50′23″N 96°38′41″W	Marysville	
11	Marysville Pony Express Barn	Marysville Pony Express Barn	April 2, 1973 (#73000767)	108 S. 8th St. 39°50′27″N 96°38′51″W	Marysville	
12	Marysville Union Pacific Depot	Marysville Union Pacific Depot	October 11, 2016 (#16000709)	000 Hedrix Ave. (at Alston St.); 39°50′39″N 96°38′56″W	Marysville	
13	Z. H. Moore Store	Z. H. Moore Store	June 24, 1976 (#76000830)	State and Center Sts. 39°57′53″N 96°36′01″W	Oketo	
14	Old Frankfort City Jail	Old Frankfort City Jail	November 1, 1982 (#82000418)	Railway Ave. 39°42′05″N 96°25′02″W	Frankfort	
15	Oregon and California Trail--Pacha Ruts		January 8, 2014 (#13001040)	Address Restricted	Bremen vicinity	
16	Samuel Powell House	Samuel Powell House	December 27, 1972 (#72000517)	108 W. Commercial St. 39°41′34″N 96°44′59″W	Waterville	
17	Pusch-Randell House	Pusch-Randell House	September 22, 1986 (#86002680)	1000 Elm St. 39°50′30″N 96°38′48″W	Marysville	
18	Robidoux Creek Pratt Truss Bridge	Robidoux Creek Pratt Truss Bridge	May 22, 2003 (#03000474)	Sunflower Rd., 0.8 miles (1.3 km) west of its junction with 21st Rd., northwest of Frankfort; 39°43′33″N 96°26′26″W	Frankfort	
19	St. Bridget Church	St. Bridget Church	September 12, 1996 (#96001011)	Rural Route 2, 6.5 miles (10.5 km) north of Axtell; 39°57′58″N 96°15′48″W	St. Bridget Township	
20	Transue Brothers Blacksmith & Wagon Shop	Transue Brothers Blacksmith & Wagon Shop	December 30, 2009 (#09001164)	309 Main St. 39°59′54″N 96°20′55″W	Summerfield	
21	Vermillion United Methodist Church	Vermillion United Methodist Church	June 10, 2024 (#100010392)	300 Silver Street; 39°43′06″N 96°16′02″W	Vermillion	
22	Waterville Opera House	Waterville Opera House	October 16, 2008 (#08000984)	200 E. Front St. 39°41′29″N 96°44′51″W	Waterville	
23	Weaver Hotel	Weaver Hotel	August 28, 1975 (#75000716)	126 S. Kansas St. 39°41′30″N 96°44′51″W	Waterville	

== See also ==
- List of National Historic Landmarks in Kansas
- National Register of Historic Places listings in Kansas
