= Marshall County, Kansas =

County in Kansas, United States

- County
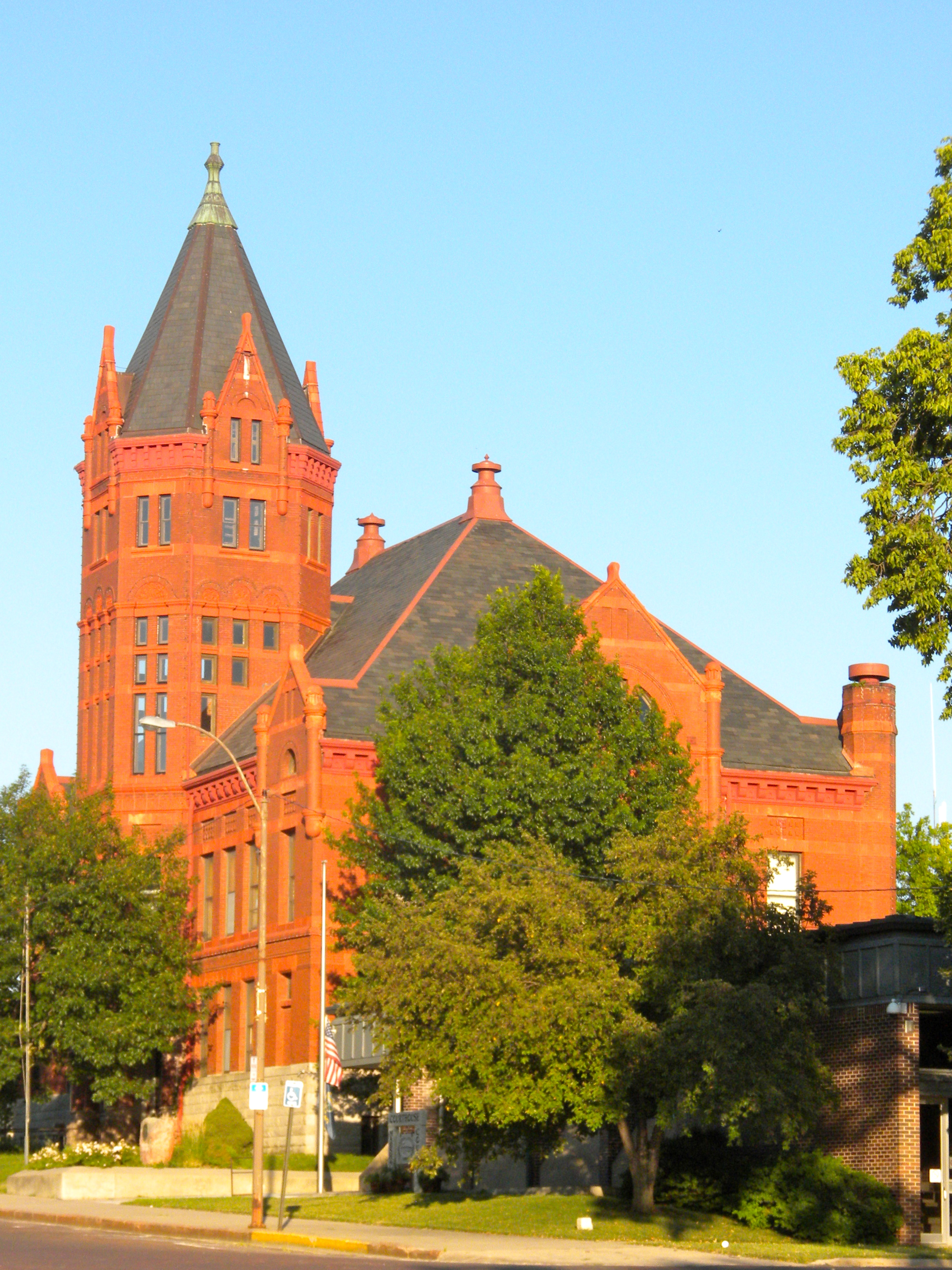
- Former Marshall County Courthouse (left), current one-story courthouse (right) in Marysville (2010)

- Location within the U.S. state of Kansas
- Coordinates: 39°48′N 96°33′W
- Country: United States
- State: Kansas
- Founded: August 25, 1855
- Named for: Frank J. Marshall
- Seat: Marysville
- Largest city: Marysville

Area
  - Total: 905 sq mi (2,340 km^{2})
  - Land: 900 sq mi (2,300 km^{2})
  - Water: 4.9 sq mi (13 km^{2}) 0.20%

Population (2020)
  - Total: 10,038
  - Estimate (2025): 9,852 ▼
  - Density: 11.1/sq mi (4.3/km^{2})
- Time zone: UTC−6 (Central)
  - Summer (DST): UTC−5 (CDT)
- Area code: 785
- Congressional district: 1st
- Website: ks283.cichosting.com/main/

Marshall County is a county located in the U.S. state of Kansas. Its county seat and largest city is Marysville. As of the 2020 census, the county population was 10,038. The county was named after Frank J. Marshall, a state representative who operated the first ferry over the Big Blue River.

== History ==
The Oregon Trail crosses Marshall County. The infamous Donner Reed Party rested along the banks of the Big Blue river and lost one of its members, Sarah Keyes, who is still buried at Alcove Springs (located outside of Marysville). Many documented pioneer bodies are buried surrounding Alcove Springs.

In 1849 Francis James Marshall, from Weston, Missouri, came to Marshall County and established a ferry service on the Big Blue River at "Independence Crossing." A few years later Francis Marshall decided to stay on in Marshall County and make it his home. He moved his ferry business to an upper crossing now known as Marysville (the city is named after Marshall's own wife Mary).

On May 30, 1879, the "Irving, Kansas Tornado" passed through Marshall County. This tornado measured F4 on the Fujita scale and had a damage path 800 yards (730 m) wide and 100 miles (160 km) long. Eighteen people were killed and sixty were injured.

The Marshall County Historical Society resides in the county's historic courthouse, which is now a museum and research library.

== Geography ==
According to the U.S. Census Bureau, the county has a total area of 905 square miles (2,340 km^{2}), of which 900 square miles (2,300 km^{2}) is land and 4.9 square miles (13 km^{2}) (0.5%) is water.

=== Adjacent counties ===
- Pawnee County, Nebraska (northeast)
- Nemaha County (east)
- Pottawatomie County (south)
- Riley County (southwest)
- Washington County (west)
- Gage County, Nebraska (northwest)

== Demographics ==
Historical population
Census	Pop.	Note	%±
1860	2,280		—
1870	6,901		202.7%
1880	16,186		134.5%
1890	23,912		47.7%
1900	24,355		1.9%
1910	23,880		−2.0%
1920	22,730		−4.8%
1930	23,056		1.4%
1940	20,986		−9.0%
1950	17,926		−14.6%
1960	15,598		−13.0%
1970	13,139		−15.8%
1980	12,787		−2.7%
1990	11,705		−8.5%
2000	10,965		−6.3%
2010	10,117		−7.7%
2020	10,038		−0.8%
2025 (est.)	9,852	▼	−1.9%
U.S. Decennial Census; 1790-1960 1900-1990; 1990-2000 2010-2020

=== Racial and ethnic composition ===
Marshall County, Kansas – Racial and ethnic composition Note: the US Census treats Hispanic/Latino as an ethnic category. This table excludes Latinos from the racial categories and assigns them to a separate category. Hispanics/Latinos may be of any race.
Race / Ethnicity (NH = Non-Hispanic)	Pop 1980	Pop 1990	Pop 2000	Pop 2010	Pop 2020	% 1980	% 1990	% 2000	% 2010	% 2020
White alone (NH)	12,724	11,601	10,716	9,727	9,410	99.51%	99.11%	97.73%	96.15%	93.74%
Black or African American alone (NH)	6	9	24	26	39	0.05%	0.08%	0.22%	0.26%	0.39%
Native American or Alaska Native alone (NH)	5	34	38	26	23	0.04%	0.29%	0.35%	0.26%	0.23%
Asian alone (NH)	13	11	21	22	41	0.10%	0.09%	0.19%	0.22%	0.41%
Native Hawaiian or Pacific Islander alone (NH)	x	x	1	3	0	x	x	0.01%	0.03%	0.00%
Other race alone (NH)	2	1	2	2	13	0.02%	0.01%	0.02%	0.02%	0.13%
Mixed race or Multiracial (NH)	x	x	80	118	285	x	x	0.73%	1.17%	2.84%
Hispanic or Latino (any race)	37	49	83	193	227	0.29%	0.42%	0.76%	1.91%	2.26%
Total	12,787	11,705	10,965	10,117	10,038	100.00%	100.00%	100.00%	100.00%	100.00%

=== 2020 census ===
As of the 2020 census, the county had a population of 10,038 and a median age of 43.6 years. 23.9% of residents were under the age of 18 and 22.7% were 65 years of age or older. For every 100 females there were 102.3 males, and for every 100 females age 18 and over there were 100.4 males. 0.0% of residents lived in urban areas, while 100.0% lived in rural areas.

The racial makeup of the county was 94.4% White, 0.4% Black or African American, 0.2% American Indian and Alaska Native, 0.5% Asian, 0.0% Native Hawaiian and Pacific Islander, 0.6% from some other race, and 3.9% from two or more races. Hispanic or Latino residents of any race comprised 2.3% of the population.

There were 4,195 households in the county, of which 27.2% had children under the age of 18 living with them and 20.9% had a female householder with no spouse or partner present. About 31.2% of all households were made up of individuals and 15.3% had someone living alone who was 65 years of age or older.

There were 4,762 housing units, of which 11.9% were vacant. Among occupied housing units, 77.4% were owner-occupied and 22.6% were renter-occupied. The homeowner vacancy rate was 2.7% and the rental vacancy rate was 12.8%.

=== 2000 census ===
As of the 2000 census, there were 10,965 people, 4,458 households, and 3,026 families residing in the county. The population density was 12 people per square mile (4.6 people/km^{2}). There were 4,999 housing units at an average density of 6 per square mile (2.3/km^{2}). The racial makeup of the county was 98.14% White, 0.23% Black or African American, 0.36% Native American, 0.19% Asian, 0.02% Pacific Islander, 0.26% from other races, and 0.80% from two or more races. 0.76% of the population were Hispanic or Latino of any race.

There were 4,458 households, out of which 30.20% had children under the age of 18 living with them, 59.70% were married couples living together, 5.40% had a female householder with no husband present, and 32.10% were non-families. 29.50% of all households were made up of individuals, and 17.00% had someone living alone who was 65 years of age or older. The average household size was 2.40 and the average family size was 2.98.

In the county, the population was spread out, with 25.00% under the age of 18, 6.60% from 18 to 24, 23.60% from 25 to 44, 22.80% from 45 to 64, and 22.00% who were 65 years of age or older. The median age was 42 years. For every 100 females there were 96.80 males. For every 100 females age 18 and over, there were 94.00 males.

The median income for a household in the county was $32,089, and the median income for a family was $39,705. Males had a median income of $28,361 versus $19,006 for females. The per capita income for the county was $17,090. About 6.40% of families and 9.20% of the population were below the poverty line, including 9.60% of those under age 18 and 9.10% of those age 65 or over.

== Government ==
=== Presidential elections ===
Marshall County is, in common with most rural regions of the Great Plains states, a predominantly Republican county. The county has not been carried by a Democratic candidate in a presidential election since 1932, and has only failed to back the Republican candidate in two other elections from 1888 on. The closest Democrats have come to winning the county since 1932 was in 1964, when Barry Goldwater only won it by 98 votes in the midst of a national landslide by Lyndon B. Johnson, and 1992 when George H. W. Bush only won it by eight votes in conjunction with independent candidate Ross Perot winning a significant share of the vote.

Presidential election results

United States presidential election results for Marshall County, Kansas
Year	Republican		Democratic		Third party(ies)	
Year	No.	%	No.	%	No.	%
1888	2,547	48.33%	1,815	34.44%	908	17.23%
1892	2,531	45.32%	0	0.00%	3,054	54.68%
1896	3,052	51.75%	2,776	47.07%	70	1.19%
1900	3,413	55.63%	2,669	43.50%	53	0.86%
1904	3,530	66.14%	1,564	29.30%	243	4.55%
1908	3,296	55.91%	2,514	42.65%	85	1.44%
1912	1,492	26.98%	2,278	41.20%	1,759	31.81%
1916	4,581	50.08%	4,275	46.74%	291	3.18%
1920	5,706	71.47%	2,026	25.38%	252	3.16%
1924	5,809	62.35%	2,369	25.43%	1,139	12.22%
1928	6,918	67.06%	3,329	32.27%	69	0.67%
1932	4,455	42.25%	5,970	56.62%	119	1.13%
1936	5,929	52.98%	5,238	46.81%	24	0.21%
1940	7,286	66.65%	3,588	32.82%	57	0.52%
1944	6,184	69.59%	2,681	30.17%	21	0.24%
1948	5,122	61.50%	3,148	37.80%	59	0.71%
1952	6,851	75.35%	2,215	24.36%	26	0.29%
1956	5,664	69.25%	2,487	30.41%	28	0.34%
1960	4,932	62.50%	2,931	37.14%	28	0.35%
1964	3,432	50.31%	3,334	48.87%	56	0.82%
1968	3,835	58.85%	1,949	29.91%	733	11.25%
1972	4,127	67.68%	1,823	29.90%	148	2.43%
1976	6,187	52.17%	5,366	45.24%	307	2.59%
1980	4,127	67.69%	1,555	25.50%	415	6.81%
1984	4,098	68.49%	1,813	30.30%	72	1.20%
1988	3,140	54.23%	2,560	44.21%	90	1.55%
1992	2,030	34.65%	2,022	34.52%	1,806	30.83%
1996	2,811	51.11%	1,932	35.13%	757	13.76%
2000	3,066	59.94%	1,831	35.80%	218	4.26%
2004	3,261	63.84%	1,789	35.02%	58	1.14%
2008	3,157	62.69%	1,784	35.42%	95	1.89%
2012	3,195	66.94%	1,469	30.78%	109	2.28%
2016	3,307	70.77%	1,072	22.94%	294	6.29%
2020	3,729	72.92%	1,259	24.62%	126	2.46%
2024	3,644	73.35%	1,205	24.26%	119	2.40%

=== Laws ===
Marshall County was a prohibition, or "dry", county until the Kansas Constitution was amended in 1986 and voters approved the sale of alcoholic liquor by the individual drink with a 30 percent food sales requirement.

== Education ==
=== Unified school districts ===
- Marysville USD 364
- Vermillion USD 380
- Valley Heights USD 498

Historical

- Axtell USD 488 (Marshall County) and Sabetha USD 441 (Nemaha County) consolidated to create Prairie Hills USD 113.

== Communities ==
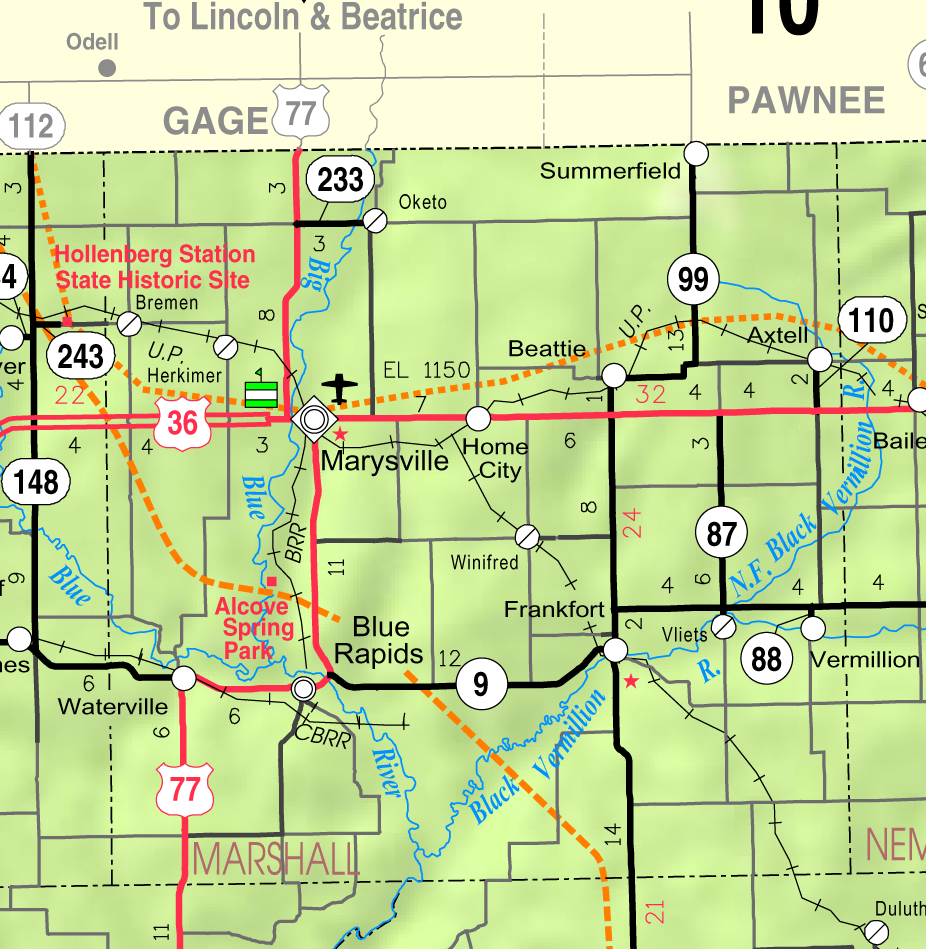
2005 map of Marshall County (map legend)

List of townships / incorporated cities / unincorporated communities / extinct former communities within Marshall County.

=== Cities ===
- Axtell
- Beattie
- Blue Rapids
- Frankfort
- Marysville (county seat)
- Oketo
- Summerfield
- Vermillion
- Waterville

=== Unincorporated communities ===
† means a community is designated a Census-Designated Place (CDP) by the United States Census Bureau.

- Bremen†
- Herkimer†
- Home†
- Lillis
- Marietta
- Vliets
- Winifred

=== Ghost towns ===
- Bigelow
- Irving

=== Townships ===
Marshall County is divided into twenty-five townships. The city of Marysville is considered governmentally independent and is excluded from the census figures for the townships. In the following table, the population center is the largest city (or cities) included in that township's population total, if it is of a significant size.

Sources: 2000 U.S. Gazetteer from the U.S. Census Bureau.
Township	FIPS	Population center	Population	Population density /km^{2} (/sq mi)	Land area km^{2} (sq mi)	Water area km^{2} (sq mi)	Water %	Geographic coordinates
Balderson	03850		106	1 (3)	98 (38)	0 (0)	0.09%	39°57′39″N 96°30′39″W
Bigelow	06725		66	1 (2)	97 (37)	1 (0)	0.96%	39°36′36″N 96°31′56″W
Blue Rapids	07675	Blue Rapids	78	1 (2)	93 (36)	0 (0)	0.23%	39°37′17″N 96°37′28″W
Blue Rapids City	07700	Irving	1,201	13 (34)	92 (36)	1 (0)	0.98%	39°41′6″N 96°39′19″W
Center	11850	Reedsville	151	2 (4)	98 (38)	0 (0)	0%	39°47′14″N 96°30′51″W
Clear Fork	13875	Bigelow	54	1 (2)	93 (36)	0 (0)	0.02%	39°36′58″N 96°23′55″W
Cleveland	14100		91	1 (3)	92 (36)	1 (0)	1.02%	39°36′43″N 96°17′47″W
Cottage Hill	15850	Cottage Hill	143	2 (4)	93 (36)	0 (0)	0.03%	39°36′10″N 96°45′34″W
Elm Creek	20600	Schroyer	178	2 (5)	93 (36)	0 (0)	0.02%	39°46′57″N 96°37′52″W
Franklin	24450	Home City	337	3 (9)	98 (38)	0 (0)	0.06%	39°51′47″N 96°31′46″W
Guittard	29225	Beattie	454	5 (13)	93 (36)	0 (0)	0.03%	39°51′52″N 96°24′53″W
Herkimer	31450		234	3 (7)	92 (36)	0 (0)	0.02%	39°57′44″N 96°45′2″W
Lincoln	40850		130	1 (4)	92 (35)	0 (0)	0.36%	39°46′56″N 96°17′27″W
Logan	41975	Bremen, Herkimer	335	4 (9)	93 (36)	0 (0)	0%	39°53′14″N 96°45′8″W
Marysville	45075	Marysville	383	5 (12)	84 (32)	0 (0)	0%	39°51′36″N 96°38′42″W
Murray	49275	Axtell	640	7 (18)	92 (36)	0 (0)	0.14%	39°52′28″N 96°16′17″W
Noble	50850	Vermillion, Vliets	217	2 (6)	92 (35)	1 (0)	0.83%	39°42′45″N 96°17′6″W
Oketo	52550	Marietta, Oketo	251	3 (7)	92 (35)	0 (0)	0%	39°57′11″N 96°37′32″W
Richland	59450	Summerfield	206	2 (6)	93 (36)	0 (0)	0%	39°57′54″N 96°23′55″W
Rock	60425		123	1 (3)	93 (36)	0 (0)	0.09%	39°47′2″N 96°24′45″W
St. Bridget	62100	Mina	232	3 (7)	92 (35)	0 (0)	0.05%	39°57′53″N 96°19′28″W
Vermillion	73550	Barrett, Frankfort	1,012	11 (28)	93 (36)	0 (0)	0.07%	39°42′12″N 96°24′48″W
Walnut	75025		144	2 (4)	93 (36)	0 (0)	0%	39°47′28″N 96°44′45″W
Waterville	75975	Waterville	797	9 (22)	93 (36)	0 (0)	0.03%	39°41′44″N 96°45′8″W
Wells	76525		131	1 (3)	98 (38)	0 (0)	0%	39°41′13″N 96°30′39″W

== Notable people ==
- Frank Wayenberg (1898-1975) - pitcher for the Cleveland Indians in 1924.
- Butch Nieman (1918-1993) - born in Herkimer, played outfield for the Boston Braves from 1943 to 1945.
- Don Songer (1899-1962) - pitcher for the Pittsburgh Pirates from 1924 to 1927 and the New York Giants in 1927.

== See also ==
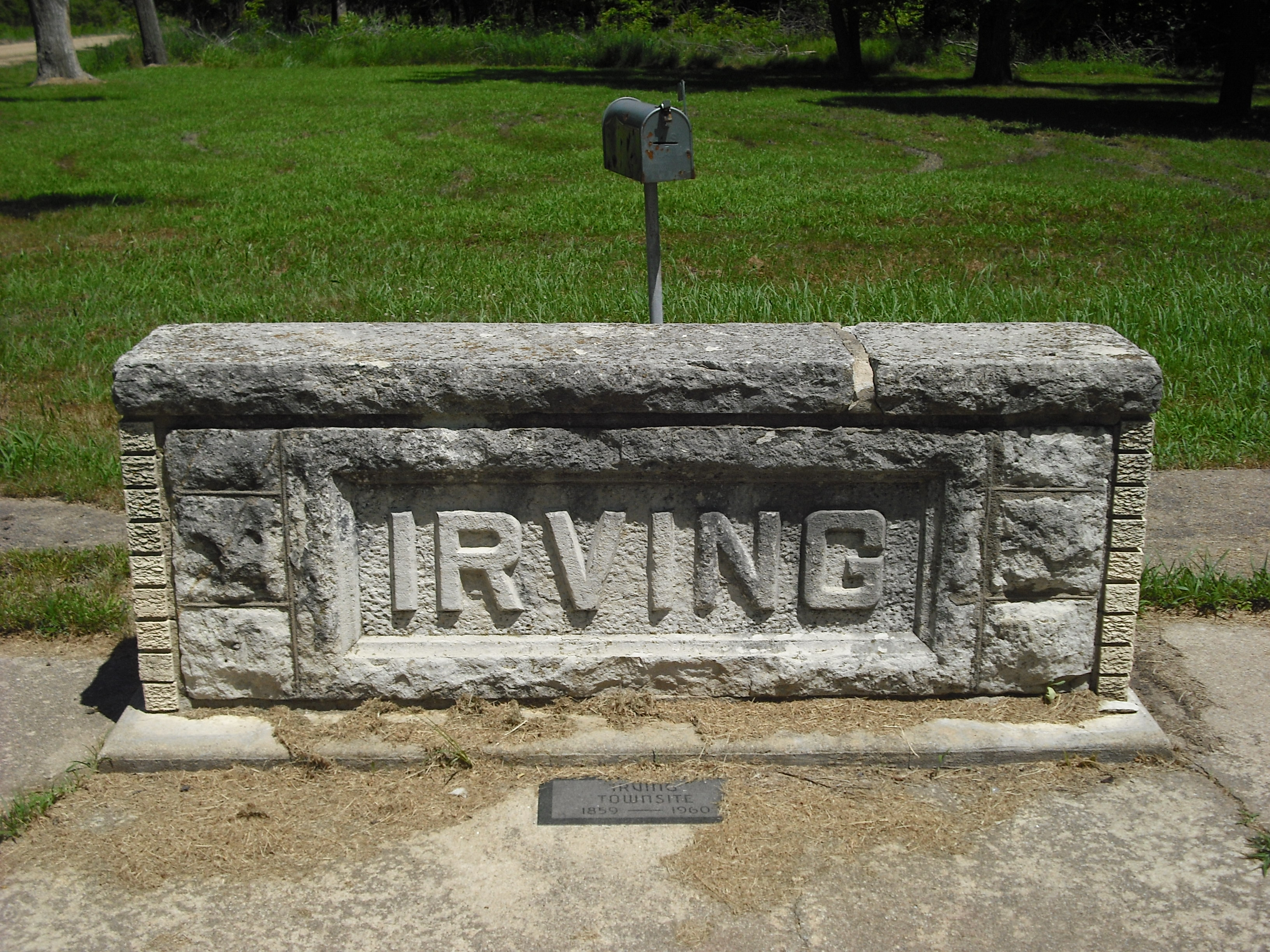
The Irving stone marker southeast of Blue Rapids.

- National Register of Historic Places listings in Marshall County, Kansas

Community information for Kansas

- Kansas locations by per capita income
- List of counties in Kansas
- List of townships in Kansas
- List of cities in Kansas
- List of unincorporated communities in Kansas
- List of ghost towns in Kansas
