= Bigelow, Kansas =

Ghost town in Marshall County, Kansas, US

- Ghost town
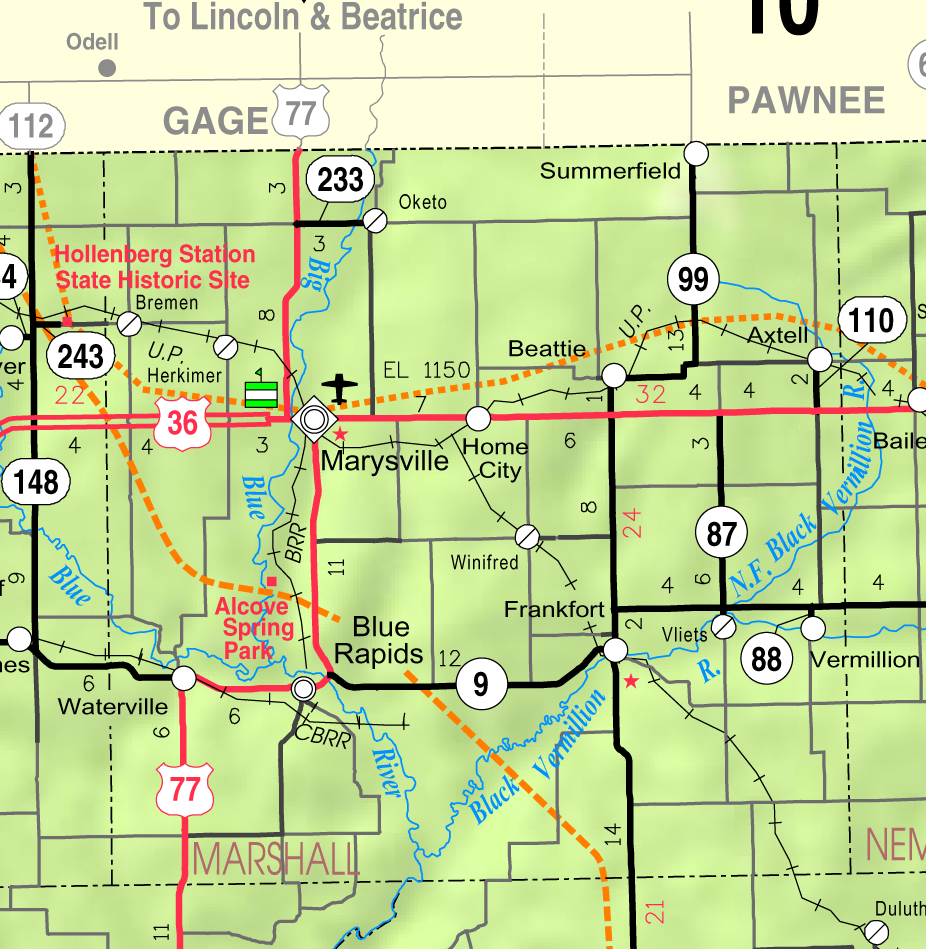
- KDOT map of Marshall County (legend)

- Location within Kansas Location within the United States
- Coordinates: 39°38′0″N 96°30′16″W
- Country: United States
- State: Kansas
- County: Marshall
- Founded: 1881
- Named for: Alfred Bigelow
- Elevation: 1,175 ft (358 m)

Population
  - Total: 0
- Time zone: UTC-6 (CST)
  - Summer (DST): UTC-5 (CDT)
- Area code: 785
- GNIS ID: 481833

Bigelow is a ghost town in Marshall County, Kansas, United States. It was located approximately 6.5 miles (10.5 km) southwest of Frankfort.

== History ==
It was founded in 1881 and named for General Alfred Bigelow. It was known for its limestone quarries and peaked in population in 1910 at 200.

Missouri Pacific Railroad bought all the limestone produced. After the railroad stopped constructing bridges in 1910, the quarries closed. The quarries reopened briefly in the 1940s but then closed permanently.

The post office closed in 1960, and the town was demolished during the construction of Tuttle Creek Lake. All that remains is a historical marker at the intersection of 17th and Zenith Roads and Antioch Cemetery.
