= Home, Kansas =

Unincorporated community in Marshall County, Kansas

- CDP
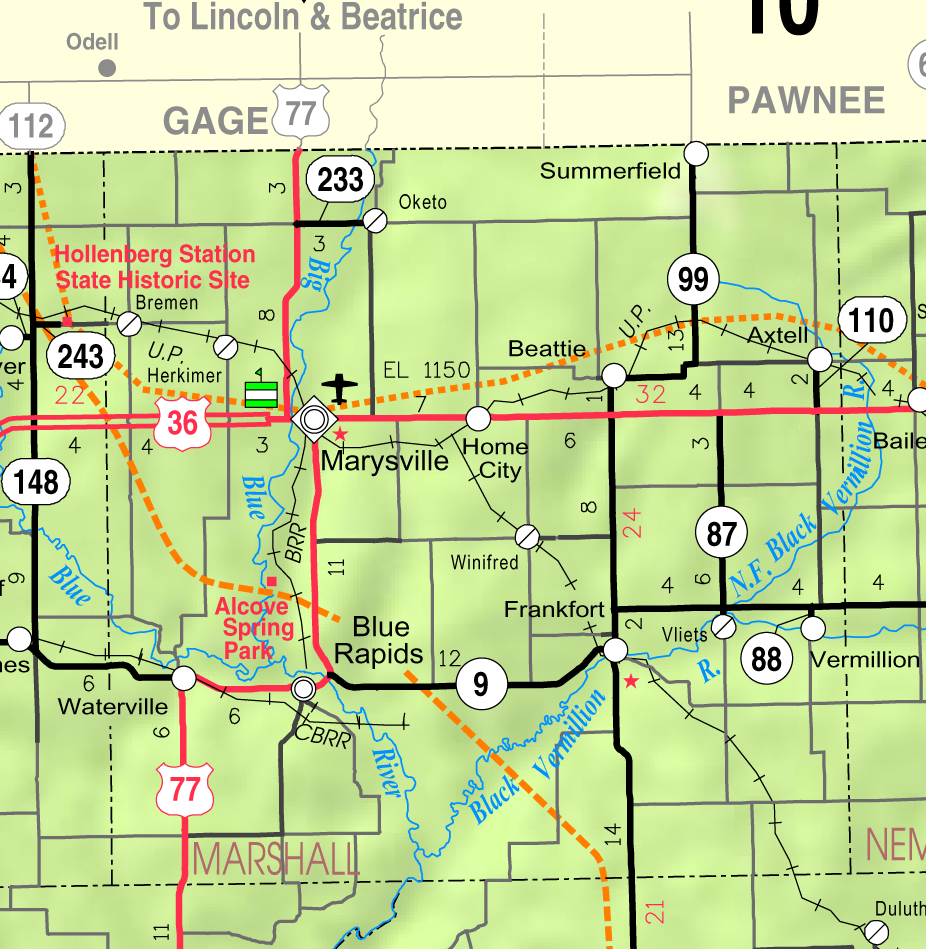
- KDOT map of Marshall County (legend)

- Location within Kansas Location within the United States
- Coordinates: 39°50′30″N 96°31′11″W
- Country: United States
- State: Kansas
- County: Marshall
- Elevation: 1,342 ft (409 m)

Population (2020)
  - Total: 154
- Time zone: UTC-6 (CST)
  - Summer (DST): UTC-5 (CDT)
- ZIP Code: 66438
- Area code: 785
- FIPS code: 20-32875
- GNIS ID: 472923

Home is a census-designated place (CDP) in southern Franklin Township, Marshall County, Kansas, United States. As of the 2020 census, the population was 154. It lies along U.S. Route 36 – the Pony Express Highway – and a Union Pacific rail line, east of the city of Marysville.

== History ==
The community gets its name from the first post office located in a private residence. Thomas B. Dexter circulated the petition in the winter of 1872-1873 for a Post Office Named Dexter. This was denied as Dexter in southern Kansas had already been established. Undeterred he resubmitted the post office application with the name Home, saying "well it's Home to me!" The post office eventually was moved to its own building, which is now facing possible closure due to postal service austerity measures.

== Geography ==
Home's altitude is 1,345 feet (410 m), and it is located at 39°50′30″N 96°31′11″W (39.8416678, -96.5197389).

== Demographics ==
Historical population
Census	Pop.	Note	%±
2020	154		—
U.S. Decennial Census

The 2020 United States census counted 154 people, 66 households, and 43 families in Home. The population density was 38.9 per square mile (15.0/km^{2}). There were 77 housing units at an average density of 19.4 per square mile (7.5/km^{2}). The racial makeup was 95.45% (147) white or European American (95.45% non-Hispanic white), 0.0% (0) black or African-American, 0.0% (0) Native American or Alaska Native, 0.0% (0) Asian, 0.0% (0) Pacific Islander or Native Hawaiian, 0.0% (0) from other races, and 4.55% (7) from two or more races. Hispanic or Latino of any race was 1.3% (2) of the population.

Of the 66 households, 19.7% had children under the age of 18; 59.1% were married couples living together; 19.7% had a female householder with no spouse or partner present. 34.8% of households consisted of individuals and 21.2% had someone living alone who was 65 years of age or older. The average household size was 2.2 and the average family size was 2.7. The percent of those with a bachelor's degree or higher was estimated to be 24.0% of the population.

24.7% of the population was under the age of 18, 1.9% from 18 to 24, 15.6% from 25 to 44, 38.3% from 45 to 64, and 19.5% who were 65 years of age or older. The median age was 57.7 years. For every 100 females, there were 108.1 males. For every 100 females ages 18 and older, there were 114.8 males.

The 2016–2020 5-year American Community Survey estimates show that the median household income was $77,639 (with a margin of error of +/- $62,724) and the median family income was $83,182 (+/- $6,103). Males had a median income of $68,558 (+/- $30,329) versus $30,795 (+/- $15,309) for females. The median income for those above 16 years old was $39,286 (+/- $18,938). Approximately, 0.0% of families and 0.0% of the population were below the poverty line, including 0.0% of those under the age of 18 and 0.0% of those ages 65 or over.

== Education ==
The community is served by Marysville USD 364 public school district.
