= Charles Koester House =

Historic house in Kansas, United States

- U.S. National Register of Historic Places
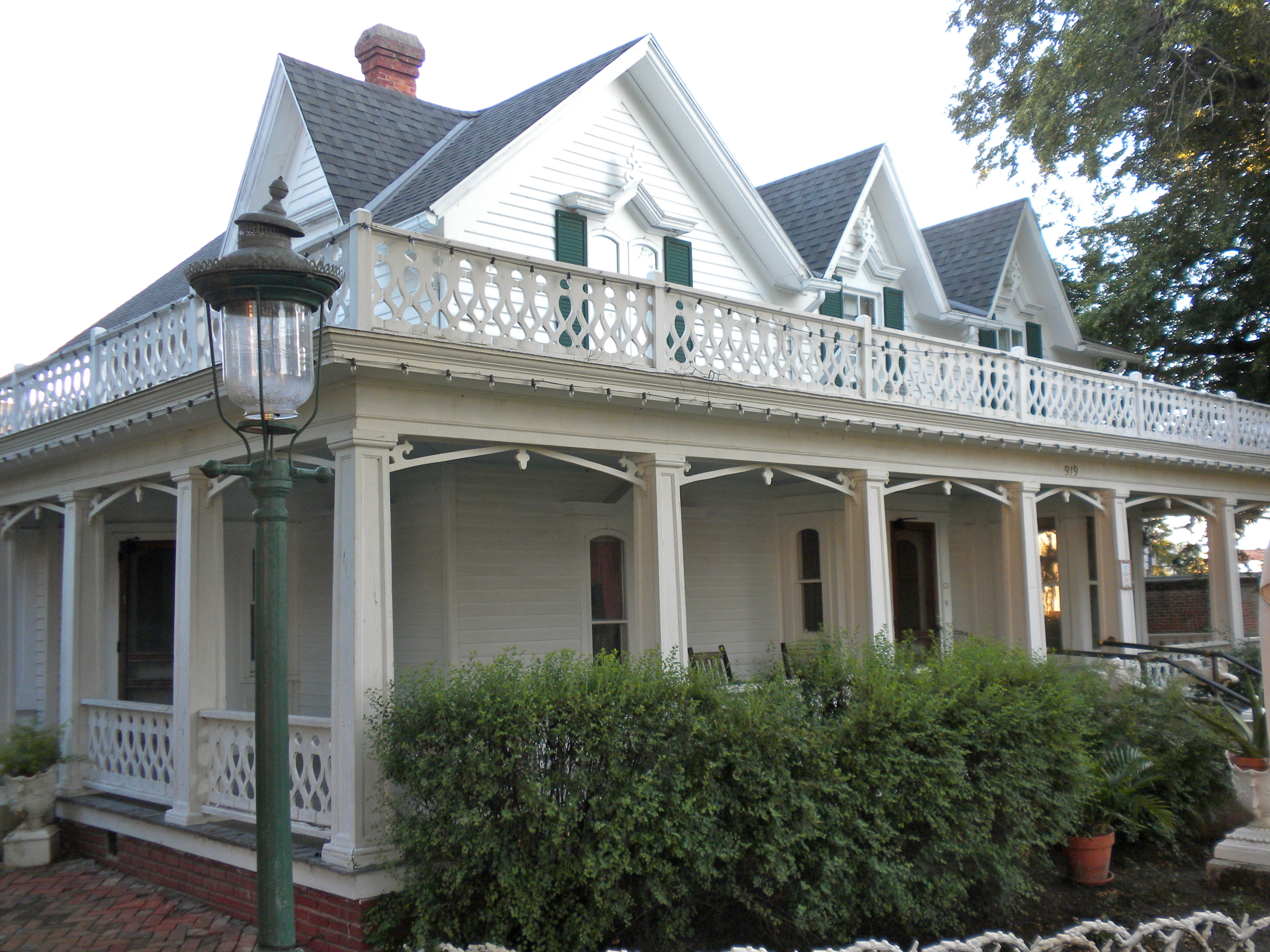

- Location within Kansas Location within the United States
- Location: 919 Broadway, Marysville, Kansas
- Coordinates: 39°50′29″N 96°38′44″W
- Area: 1 acre (0.40 ha)
- Built: 1873
- NRHP reference No.: 75000715
- Added to NRHP: May 12, 1975

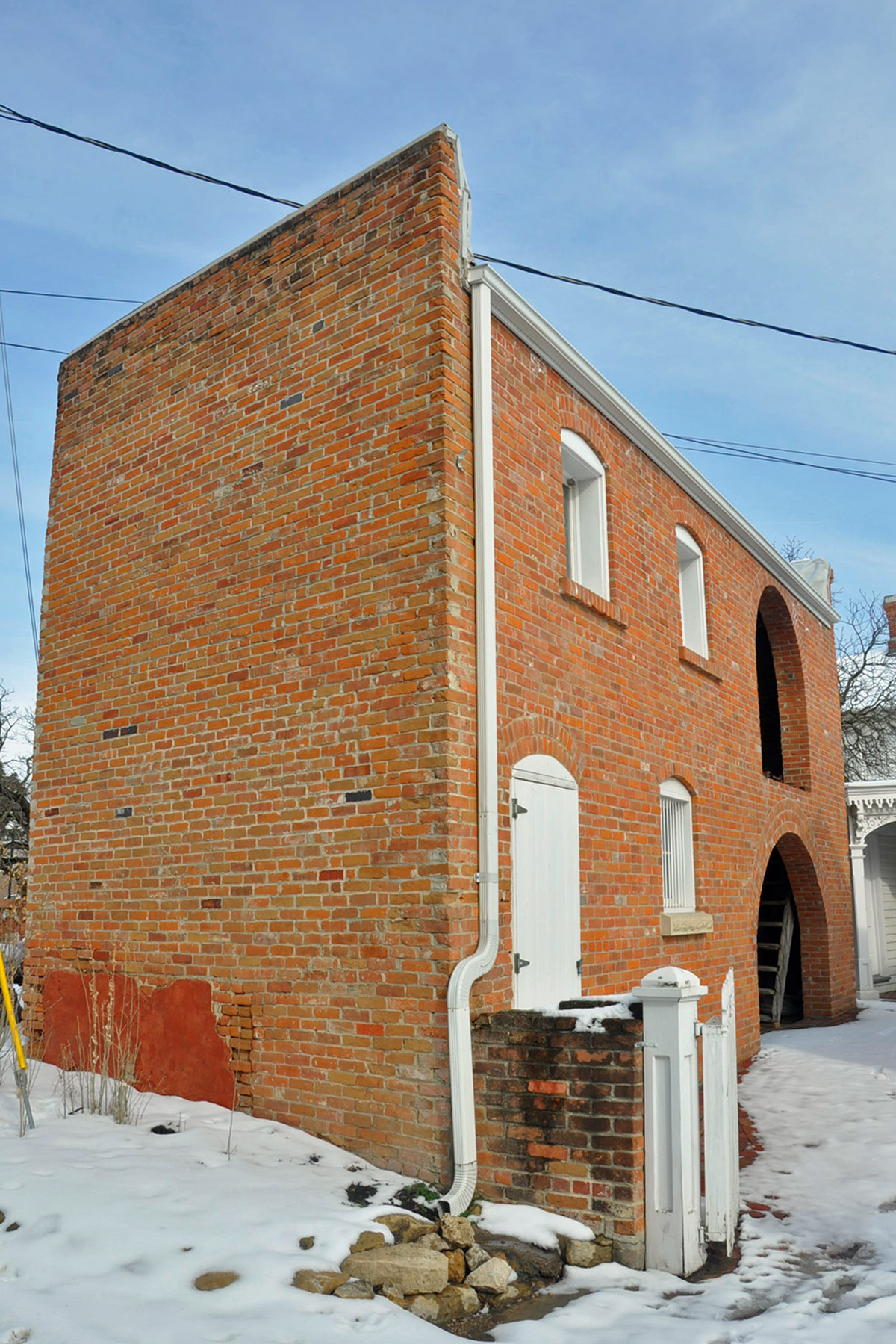

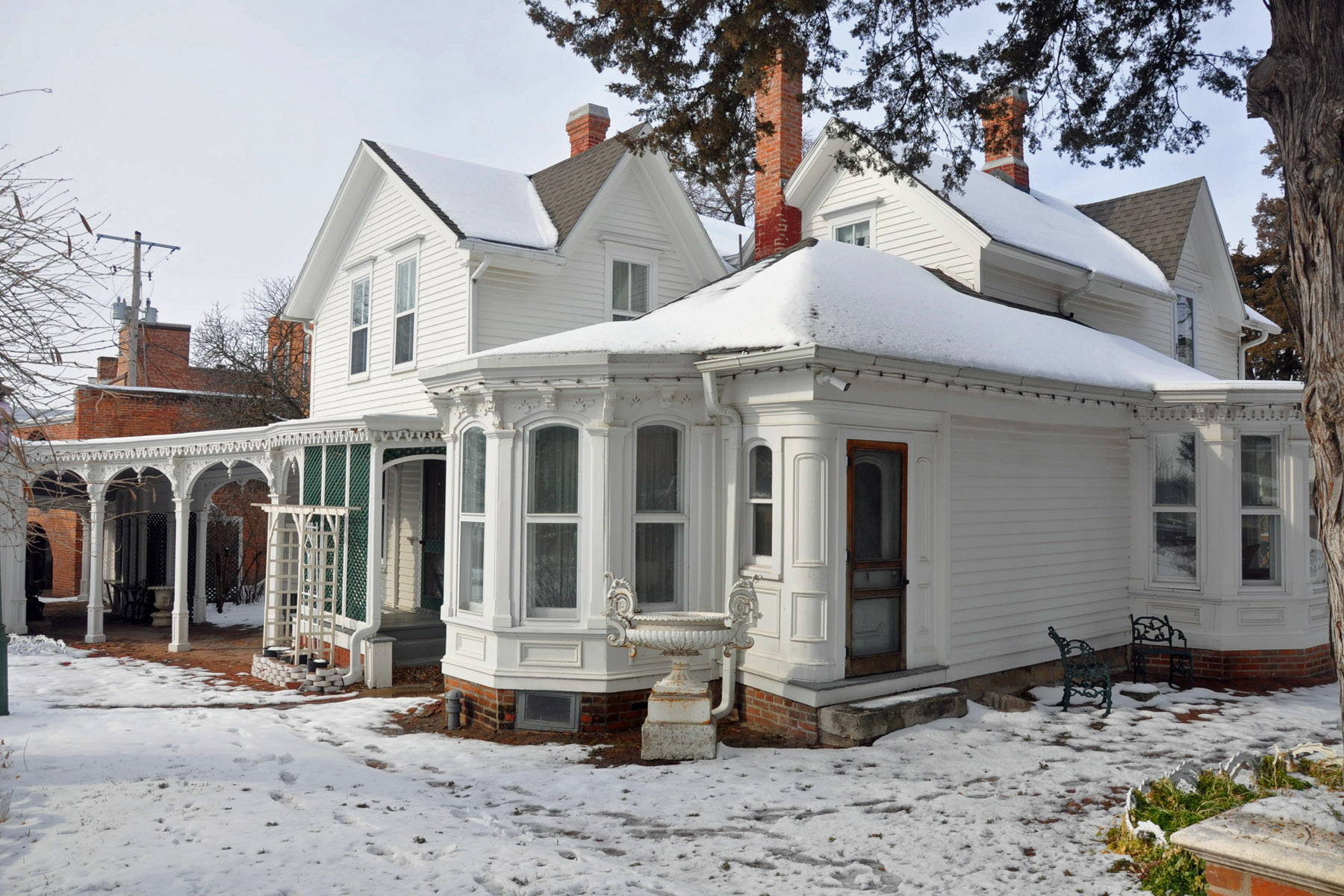

The Charles Koester House at 919 Broadway in Marysville, Kansas was built in 1873. It was listed on the National Register of Historic Places in 1975.

It was the home of Charles F. Koester. It has been termed "The Most Beautiful House in Kansas", by dint of the quality of the house plus extensive landscaping.

It has also been known as the Koester House Museum.

The house is also included in the NRHP-listed Koester Block Historic District. The district also contains the home of Charles F. Koestler's son, Charles J. D. Koester, which is named the Charles J.D. Koester House, and which faces onto Elm Street.
