= Beattie, Kansas =

City in Marshall County, Kansas

- City
- Location within Marshall County and Kansas

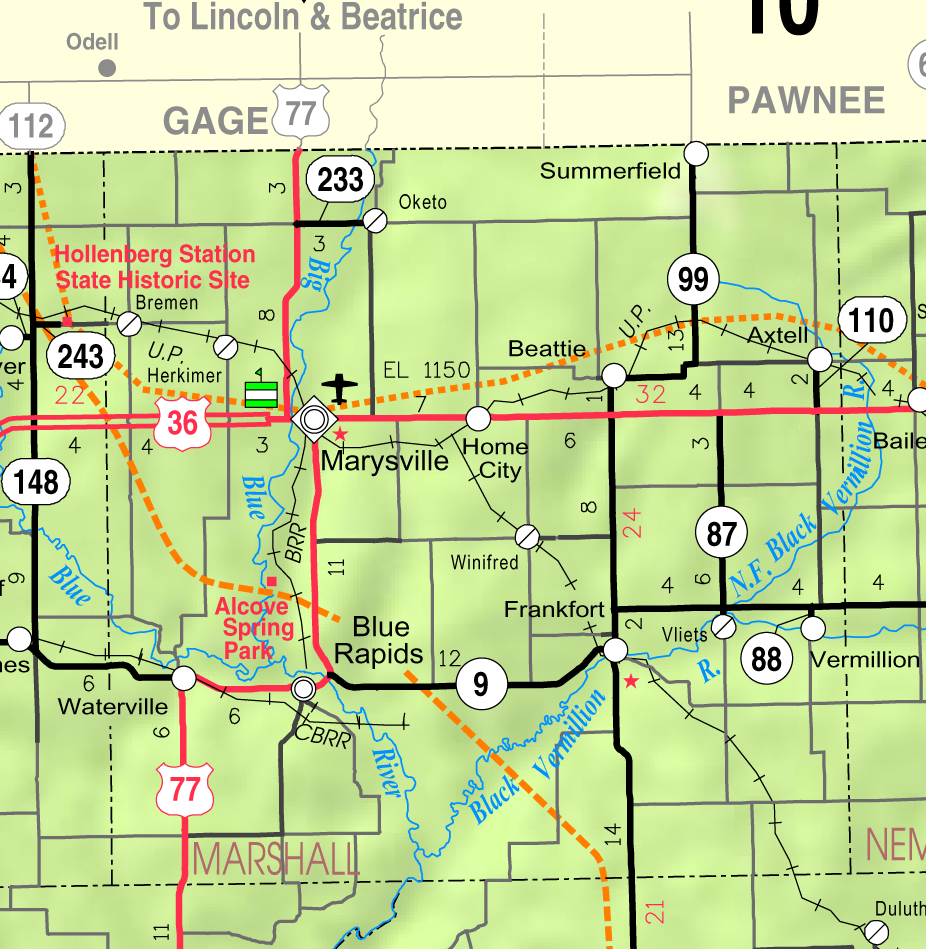
- KDOT map of Marshall County (legend)
- Coordinates: 39°51′45″N 96°25′04″W
- Country: United States
- State: Kansas
- County: Marshall
- Platted: 1870
- Incorporated: 1884
- Named for: Armstrong Beattie

Area
  - Total: 0.23 sq mi (0.59 km^{2})
  - Land: 0.23 sq mi (0.59 km^{2})
  - Water: 0 sq mi (0.00 km^{2})
- Elevation: 1,326 ft (404 m)

Population (2020)
  - Total: 197
  - Density: 860/sq mi (330/km^{2})
- Time zone: UTC-6 (CST)
  - Summer (DST): UTC-5 (CDT)
- ZIP Code: 66406
- Area code: 785
- FIPS code: 20-04900
- GNIS ID: 2394097

Beattie is a city in Marshall County, Kansas, United States. As of the 2020 census, the population of the city was 197. The city has been called "The Milo Capital of the World" and hosts the annual "Beattie Milo Festival".

== History ==
Beattie was laid out in 1870. It is named for Armstrong Beattie, eighth Mayor of St. Joseph, Missouri.

The first post office in Beattie was established in July 1871.

== Geography ==
According to the United States Census Bureau, the city has a total area of 0.23 square miles (0.60 km^{2}), all land.

== Demographics ==
Historical population
Census	Pop.	Note	%±
1880	270		—
1890	648		140.0%
1900	633		−2.3%
1910	497		−21.5%
1920	452		−9.1%
1930	434		−4.0%
1940	389		−10.4%
1950	321		−17.5%
1960	314		−2.2%
1970	288		−8.3%
1980	316		9.7%
1990	221		−30.1%
2000	277		25.3%
2010	200		−27.8%
2020	197		−1.5%
U.S. Decennial Census

=== 2020 census ===
The 2020 United States census counted 197 people, 86 households, and 53 families in Beattie. The population density was 860.3 per square mile (332.1/km^{2}). There were 89 housing units at an average density of 388.6 per square mile (150.1/km^{2}). The racial makeup was 90.86% (179) white or European American (89.85% non-Hispanic white), 1.52% (3) black or African-American, 1.52% (3) Native American or Alaska Native, 0.0% (0) Asian, 0.0% (0) Pacific Islander or Native Hawaiian, 0.51% (1) from other races, and 5.58% (11) from two or more races. Hispanic or Latino of any race was 2.54% (5) of the population.

Of the 86 households, 27.9% had children under the age of 18; 50.0% were married couples living together; 20.9% had a female householder with no spouse or partner present. 33.7% of households consisted of individuals and 15.1% had someone living alone who was 65 years of age or older. The average household size was 2.2 and the average family size was 2.5. The percent of those with a bachelor's degree or higher was estimated to be 11.2% of the population.

19.3% of the population was under the age of 18, 4.6% from 18 to 24, 24.4% from 25 to 44, 31.5% from 45 to 64, and 20.3% who were 65 years of age or older. The median age was 47.5 years. For every 100 females, there were 84.1 males. For every 100 females ages 18 and older, there were 91.6 males.

The 2016–2020 5-year American Community Survey estimates show that the median household income was $47,375 (with a margin of error of +/- $16,605) and the median family income was $35,000 (+/- $16,401). The median income for those above 16 years old was $30,909 (+/- $2,453). Approximately, 0.0% of families and 10.4% of the population were below the poverty line, including 0.0% of those under the age of 18 and 10.4% of those ages 65 or over.

=== 2010 census ===
As of the census of 2010, there were 200 people, 90 households, and 51 families residing in the city. The population density was 869.6 inhabitants per square mile (335.8/km^{2}). There were 104 housing units at an average density of 452.2 per square mile (174.6/km^{2}). The racial makeup of the city was 95.0% White, 1.0% African American, 1.5% Native American, 1.0% from other races, and 1.5% from two or more races. Hispanic or Latino of any race were 3.5% of the population.

There were 90 households, of which 18.9% had children under the age of 18 living with them, 50.0% were married couples living together, 3.3% had a female householder with no husband present, 3.3% had a male householder with no wife present, and 43.3% were non-families. 42.2% of all households were made up of individuals, and 21.1% had someone living alone who was 65 years of age or older. The average household size was 2.01 and the average family size was 2.73.

The median age in the city was 49.5 years. 14% of residents were under the age of 18; 8% were between the ages of 18 and 24; 21% were from 25 to 44; 41% were from 45 to 64; and 16% were 65 years of age or older. The gender makeup of the city was 50.0% male and 50.0% female.

=== 2000 census ===
As of the census of 2000, there were 277 people, 107 households, and 63 families residing in the city. The population density was 1,210.3 inhabitants per square mile (467.3/km^{2}). There were 115 housing units at an average density of 502.5 per square mile (194.0/km^{2}). The racial makeup of the city was 95.67% White, 0.36% African American, 0.36% Pacific Islander, 2.89% from other races, and 0.72% from two or more races. Hispanic or Latino of any race were 3.97% of the population.

There were 107 households, out of which 32.7% had children under the age of 18 living with them, 52.3% were married couples living together, 2.8% had a female householder with no husband present, and 41.1% were non-families. 35.5% of all households were made up of individuals, and 19.6% had someone living alone who was 65 years of age or older. The average household size was 2.51 and the average family size was 3.25.

In the city, the population was spread out, with 26.4% under the age of 18, 7.2% from 18 to 24, 28.2% from 25 to 44, 21.7% from 45 to 64, and 16.6% who were 65 years of age or older. The median age was 39 years. For every 100 females, there were 99.3 males. For every 100 females age 18 and over, there were 92.5 males.

The median income for a household in the city was $29,583, and the median income for a family was $36,875. Males had a median income of $30,066 versus $14,722 for females. The per capita income for the city was $12,204. About 14.9% of families and 17.0% of the population were below the poverty line, including 10.9% of those under the age of eighteen and 11.1% of those 65 or over.

== Education ==
The community is served by Marysville USD 364 public school district.
