= Marysville station (Kansas) =

- Marysville Union Pacific Depot
- U.S. National Register of Historic Places
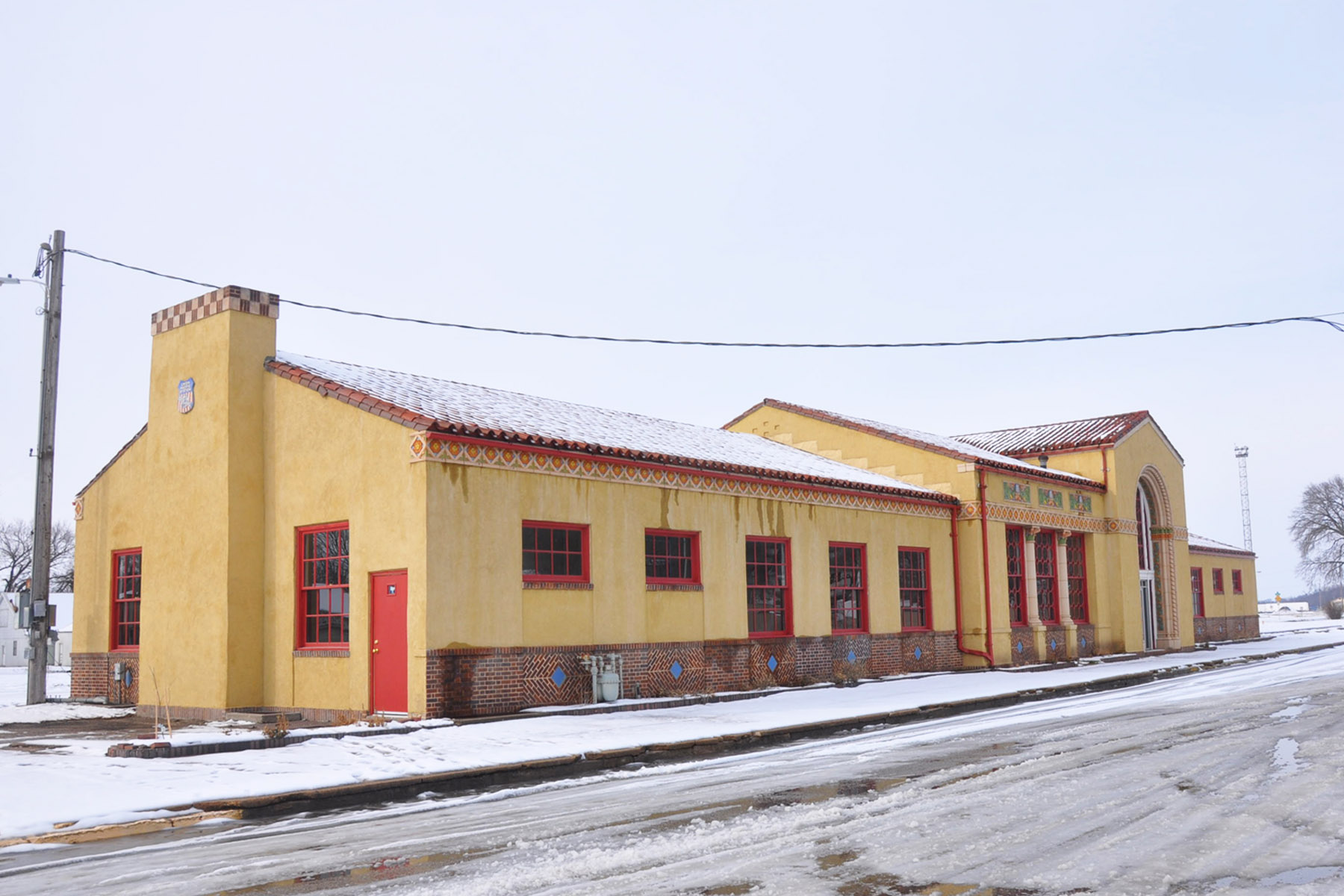

- Location within Kansas Location within the United States
- Location: 400 Hedrix Ave; Marysville, Kansas
- Coordinates: 39°50′39″N 96°38′57″W
- Built: 1929
- Architect: Gilbert Stanley Underwood
- Architectural style: Spanish Revival
- NRHP reference No.: 16000709
- Added to NRHP: October 11, 2016

The Marysville station, nominated as the Marysville Union Pacific Depot, is a historic railroad depot building at 400 Hedrix Ave in Marysville, Kansas. The depot was at the junction of multiple lines of the Union Pacific Railroad with connections to St. Joseph, Topeka, Manahattan, Grand Island and other cities. In the 1920s, city leaders considered the 1880 wooden depot "deplorable" and pressured Union Pacific to provide a new depot. Gilbert Stanley Underwood drafted plans for a new depot based on the design of the depot in Gering, Nebraska. Construction began in August 1928 and was completed April 11, 1929 with a celebratory parade from the courthouse to the depot. The first trains began stopping the next day.

Passenger service to the depot ended in 1955, although passengers could ride in the caboose of a freight train for a few more years. The station was added to the National Register of Historic Places on October 11, 2016.

Preceding station	Union Pacific Railroad	Following station
Blue Rapids toward Manhattan	Manhattan – Valley	Oketo toward Valley
