= Frankfort School =

- U.S. National Register of Historic Places
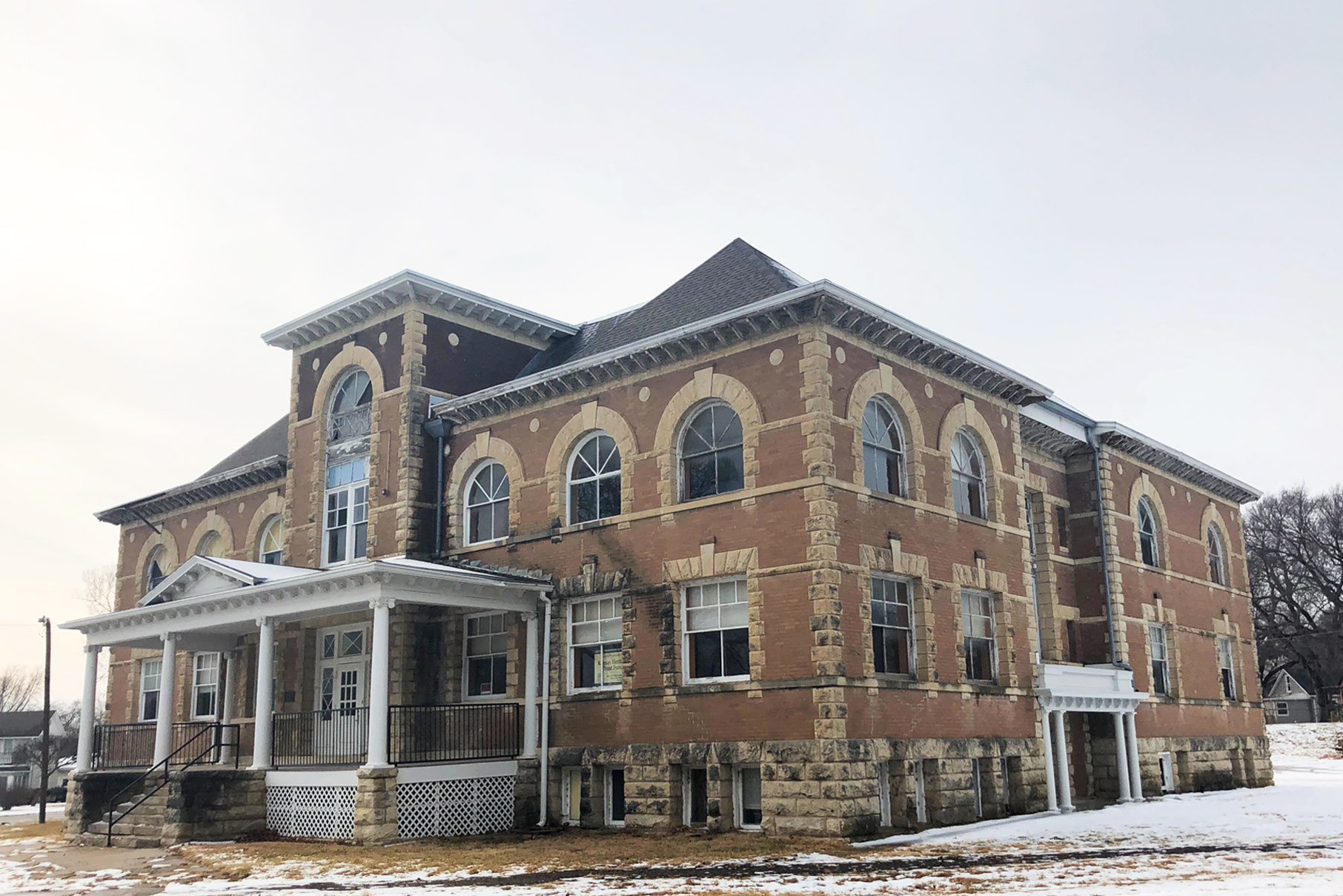
- The Frankfort School in 2021

- Location within Kansas Location within the United States
- Location: 400 Locust St. Frankfort, Kansas
- Coordinates: 39°42′17″N 96°25′01″W
- Area: 1 acre (0.40 ha)
- Built: 1902–03
- Architect: A.W. Snodgrass
- Architectural style: Renaissance Revival
- NRHP reference No.: 72000515
- Added to NRHP: December 27, 1972

The Frankfort School at 400 Locust St. in Frankfort, Kansas, was built during 1902–03. It was listed on the National Register of Historic Places in 1972.

It was deemed to be "an excellent example of Renaissance-influenced turn-of-the-century school architecture in Kansas."

The school was designed by local architect A.W. Snodgrass after the previous, 1880-built school was destroyed by a fire caused by a lightning strike on August 20, 1902.
