= Koester Block Historic District =

Historic district in Kansas, United States

- U.S. National Register of Historic Places
- U.S. Historic district
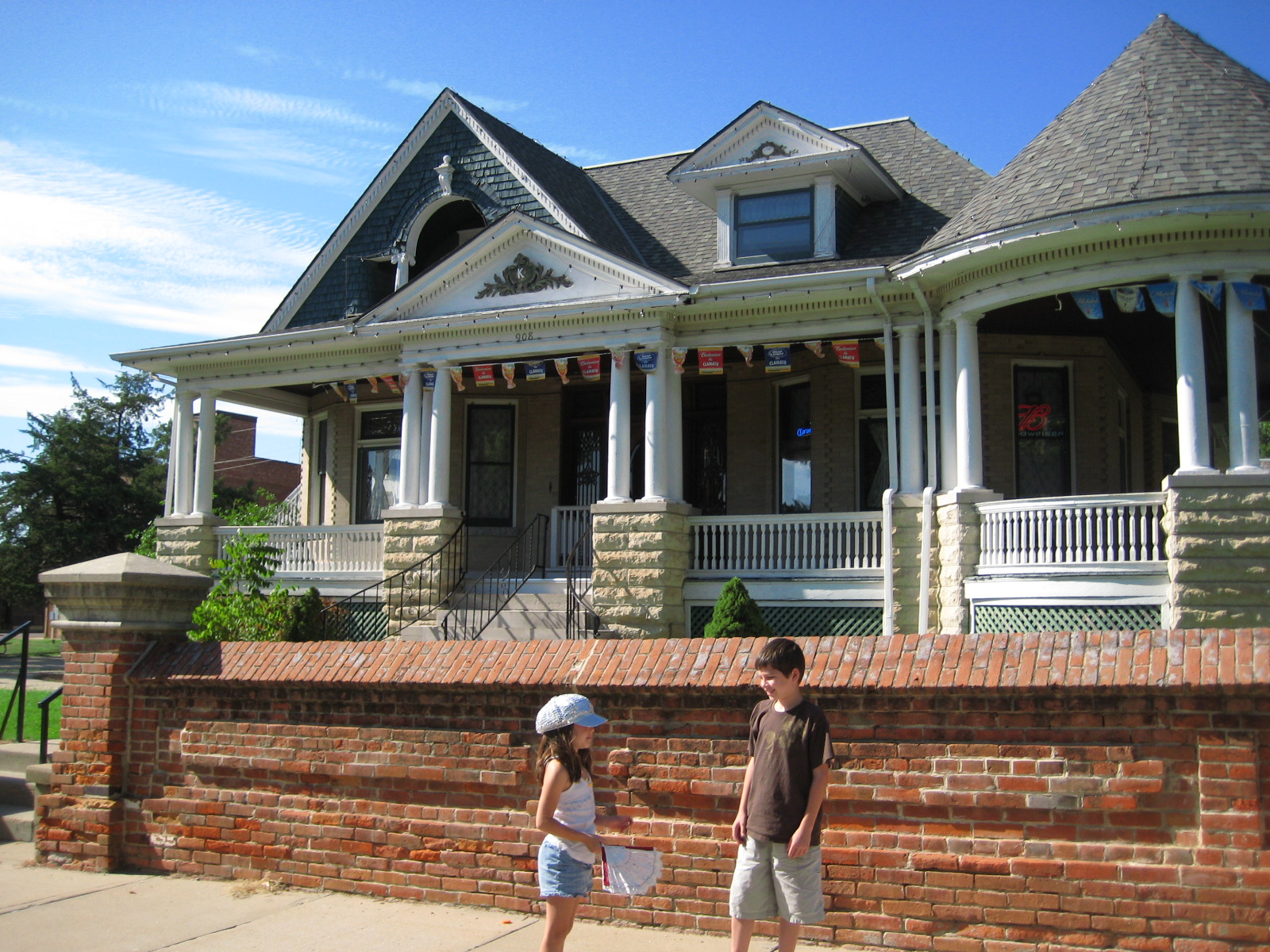

- Location within Kansas Location within the United States
- Location: Between 9th, 10th, Elm and Broadway Sts., Marysville, Kansas
- Coordinates: 39°50′29″N 96°38′44″W
- Area: 1.5 acres (0.61 ha)
- Built: 1870
- Built by: Crothers, W.E., et al.
- Architectural style: Commercial Palace
- NRHP reference No.: 80001469
- Added to NRHP: December 5, 1980

The Koester Block Historic District is a historic district which was listed on the National Register of Historic Places in 1980.

The 1.5 acres (0.61 ha) listed area included five contributing buildings.

It includes the Charles Koester House, which is separately listed on the National Register, and was the home of Charles F. Koester. The district also includes the Charles J. D. Koester House and three commercial buildings.
