= Marietta, Kansas =

Unincorporated community in Marshall County, Kansas

- Unincorporated community
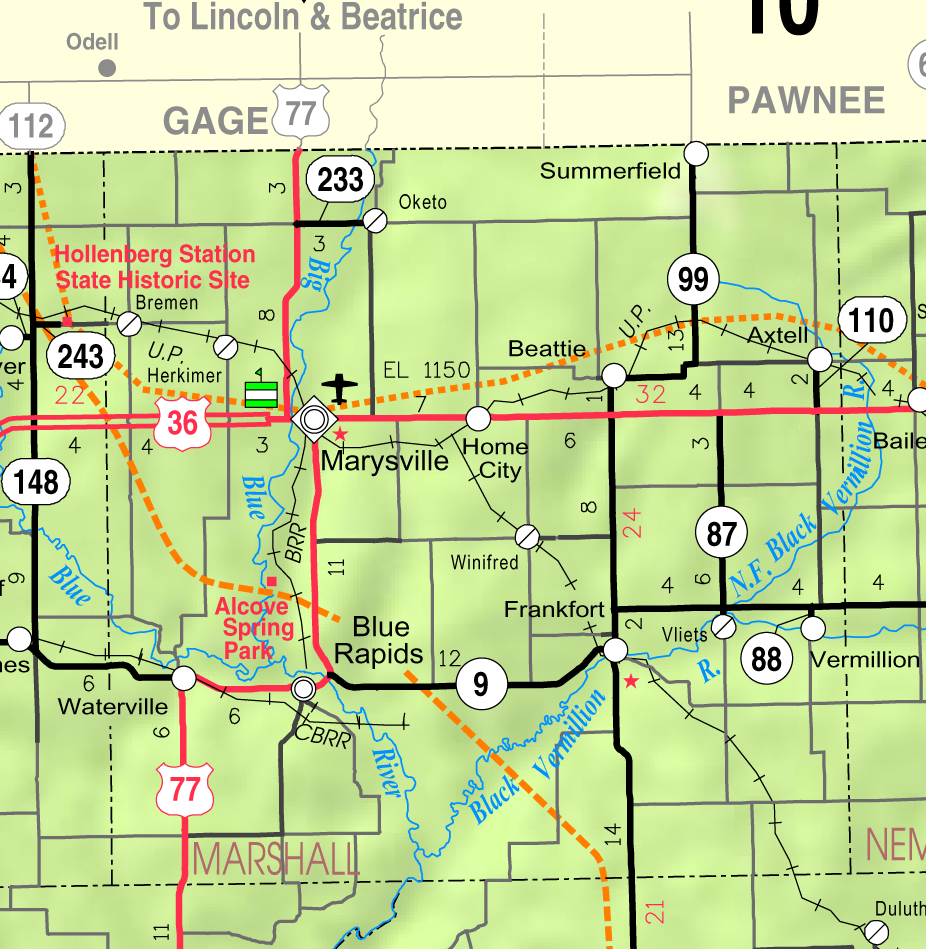
- KDOT map of Marshall County (legend)

- Location within Kansas Location within the United States
- Coordinates: 39°56′35″N 96°36′31″W
- Country: United States
- State: Kansas
- County: Marshall
- Named for: Mrs. Marieta Mann
- Elevation: 1,188 ft (362 m)
- Time zone: UTC-6 (CST)
  - Summer (DST): UTC-5 (CDT)
- Area code: 785
- FIPS code: 20-44625
- GNIS ID: 472691

Marietta is an unincorporated community in Marshall County, Kansas, United States.

== History ==
Marietta was named for Mrs. Marieta Mann. Marietta had a post office from 1895 until 1959.

== Education ==
The community is served by Marysville USD 364 public school district.
