= Butch Nieman =

American baseball player (1918-1993)

- Outfielder
- Born: February 8, 1918; Herkimer, Kansas, U.S.
- Died: November 2, 1993 (aged 75); Topeka, Kansas, U.S.
- Batted: Left Threw: Left

MLB debut
- May 2, 1943, for the Boston Braves

Last MLB appearance
- September 30, 1945, for the Boston Braves

MLB statistics
- Batting average: .256
- Home runs: 37
- Runs batted in: 167
- Stats at Baseball Reference

Teams
- Boston Braves (1943–1945)

Elmer Le Roy "Butch" Nieman (February 8, 1918 – November 2, 1993) was an American Major League Baseball outfielder who played for the Boston Braves from 1943 to 1945. He played collegiately at Kansas State University from 1938–1939. He was a native of Herkimer, Kansas.

Nieman is one of many ballplayers who only appeared in the major leagues during World War II. He was a regular for Boston during much of his three years with the team. He finished in the league's TOP TEN for triples in 1943, for home runs in 1944, and for at bats per home run in 1945.

Career totals include 332 games played, 269 hits, 37 home runs, 167 RBI, 147 runs, a .256 batting average, and a slugging percentage of .432. He was a slightly below average defensive outfielder for his era, and in his 317 appearances had a fielding percentage of .961. One defensive highlight was 13 assists in 1944.

Nieman died at the age of 75 in Topeka, Kansas.
