= Weaver Hotel =

- U.S. National Register of Historic Places
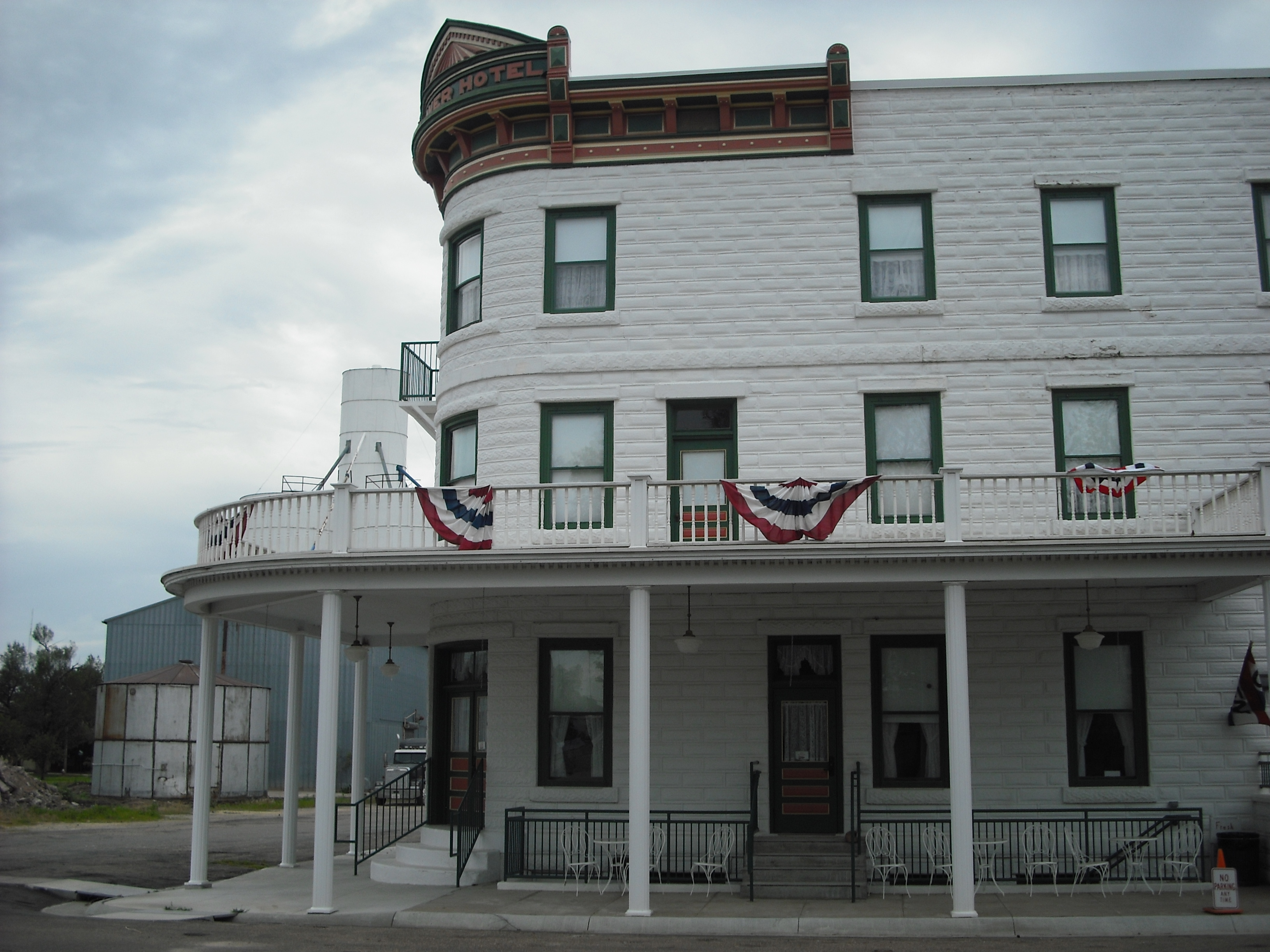

- Location within Kansas Location within the United States
- Location: 126 S. Kansas St., Waterville, Kansas
- Coordinates: 39°41′30″N 96°44′51″W
- Area: 1 acre (0.40 ha)
- Built: 1905
- Architect: Brooks, J.J.; Schmidt, Herman
- Architectural style: Renaissance
- NRHP reference No.: 75000716
- Added to NRHP: August 28, 1975

The Weaver Hotel was built in 1905–06 in Waterville, Kansas. The only three-story building in Waterville, it was built by William E. Weaver for his parents. The hotel has operated more or less continuously ever since.

The hotel is located at the corner of Kansas and Front Streets. The precast concrete block building is about 90 feet (27 m) long and 22 feet (6.7 m) wide. The stone-textured blocks have been painted white. The flat roof is concealed by a parapet, with a painted wood parapet at the corner. A wood porch extends along the south side, around the rounded corner of the building and halfway down the east side. Restaurant space originally occupied the ground floor, with guest rooms on the upper levels.

The Weaver Hotel was listed on the National Register of Historic Places on August 28, 1975.
