= Oketo, Kansas =

City in Marshall County, Kansas

- City
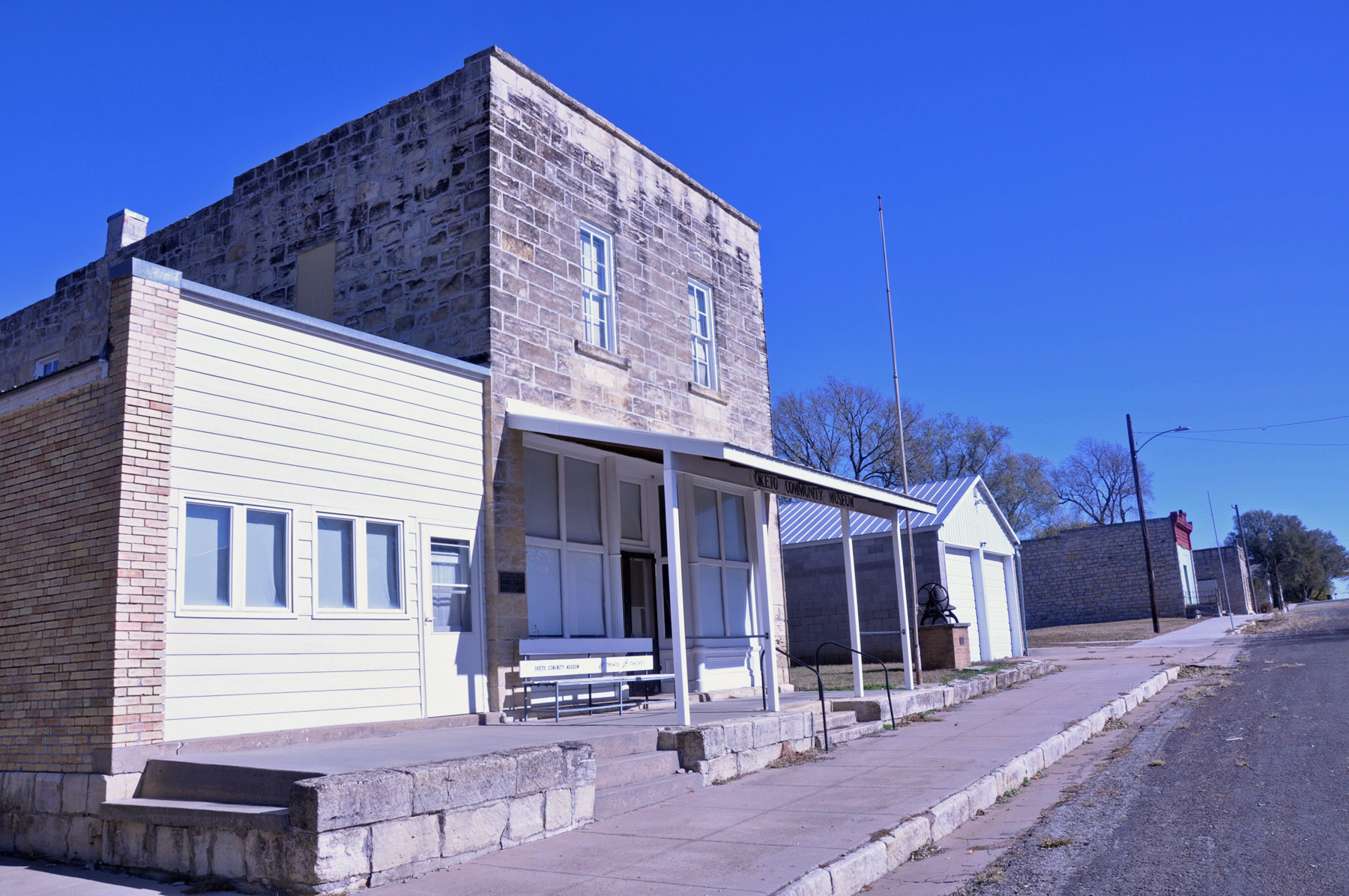
- Oketo Community Museum (at corner of Center and State streets) (2020)

- Location within Marshall County and Kansas

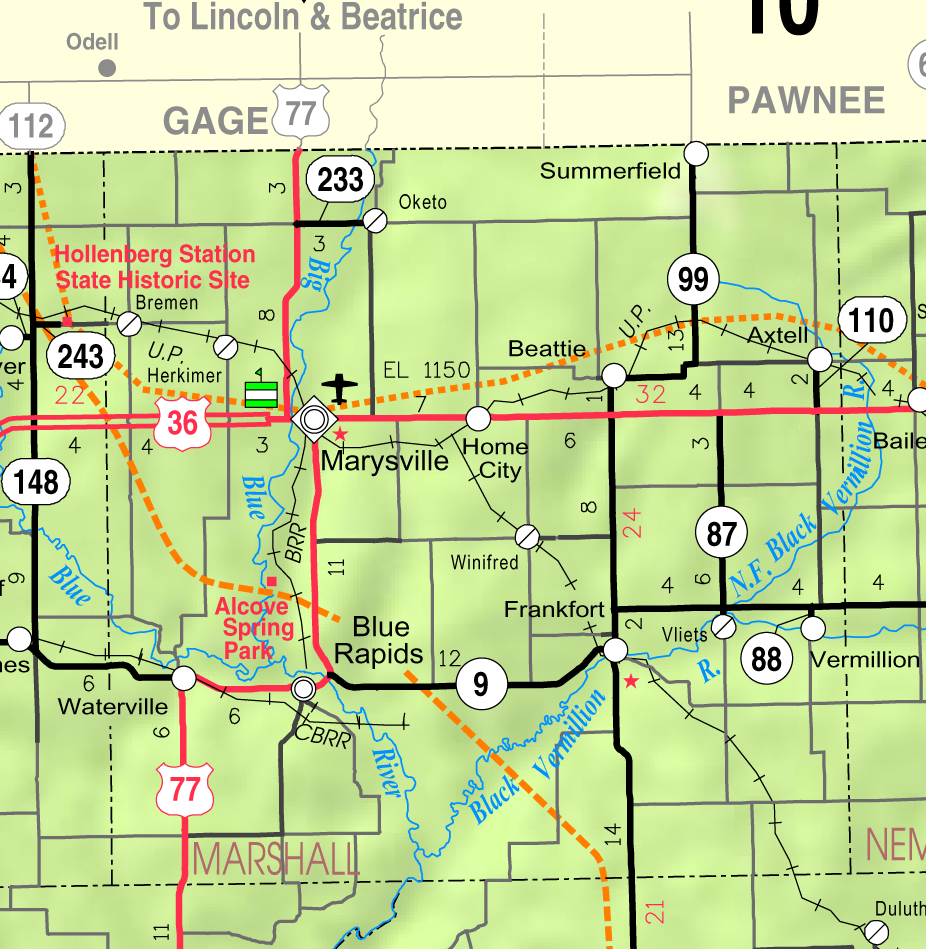
- KDOT map of Marshall County (legend)
- Coordinates: 39°57′48″N 96°35′56″W
- Country: United States
- State: Kansas
- County: Marshall
- Incorporated: 1887

Area
  - Total: 0.10 sq mi (0.27 km^{2})
  - Land: 0.10 sq mi (0.27 km^{2})
  - Water: 0 sq mi (0.00 km^{2})
- Elevation: 1,270 ft (390 m)

Population (2020)
  - Total: 64
  - Density: 610/sq mi (240/km^{2})
- Time zone: UTC-6 (CST)
  - Summer (DST): UTC-5 (CDT)
- ZIP Code: 66518
- Area code: 785
- FIPS code: 20-52525
- GNIS ID: 2395312

Oketo is a city in Marshall County, Kansas, United States. As of the 2020 census, the population of the city was 64.

== History ==
Oketo was incorporated as a city, as defined by Kansas law, in 1870. It was named for a chief of the Otoe tribe.

The first post office in Oketo was established in May 1873.

== Geography ==
According to the United States Census Bureau, the city has a total area of 0.11 square miles (0.28 km^{2}), all land.

== Demographics ==
Historical population
Census	Pop.	Note	%±
1890	334		—
1900	347		3.9%
1910	253		−27.1%
1920	225		−11.1%
1930	225		0.0%
1940	218		−3.1%
1950	169		−22.5%
1960	128		−24.3%
1970	133		3.9%
1980	130		−2.3%
1990	116		−10.8%
2000	87		−25.0%
2010	66		−24.1%
2020	64		−3.0%
U.S. Decennial Census

=== 2020 census ===
The 2020 United States census counted 64 people, 30 households, and 22 families in Oketo. The population density was 621.4 per square mile (239.9/km^{2}). There were 40 housing units at an average density of 388.3 per square mile (149.9/km^{2}). The racial makeup was 87.5% (56) white or European American (87.5% non-Hispanic white), 0.0% (0) black or African-American, 0.0% (0) Native American or Alaska Native, 1.56% (1) Asian, 0.0% (0) Pacific Islander or Native Hawaiian, 4.69% (3) from other races, and 6.25% (4) from two or more races. Hispanic or Latino of any race was 6.25% (4) of the population.

Of the 30 households, 30.0% had children under the age of 18; 53.3% were married couples living together; 3.3% had a female householder with no spouse or partner present. 26.7% of households consisted of individuals and 13.3% had someone living alone who was 65 years of age or older. The average household size was 1.4 and the average family size was 2.6. The percent of those with a bachelor's degree or higher was estimated to be 17.2% of the population.

12.5% of the population was under the age of 18, 7.8% from 18 to 24, 23.4% from 25 to 44, 32.8% from 45 to 64, and 23.4% who were 65 years of age or older. The median age was 54.0 years. For every 100 females, there were 88.2 males. For every 100 females ages 18 and older, there were 75.0 males.

The 2016–2020 5-year American Community Survey estimates show that the median household income was $63,828 (with a margin of error of +/- $563) and the median family income was $71,875 (+/- $23,337). Males had a median income of $63,438 (+/- $1,659) versus $20,938 (+/- $8,959) for females. The median income for those above 16 years old was $63,047 (+/- $19,580). Approximately, 0.0% of families and 0.0% of the population were below the poverty line, including 0.0% of those under the age of 18 and 0.0% of those ages 65 or over.

=== 2010 census ===
As of the census of 2010, there were 66 people, 31 households, and 19 families residing in the city. The population density was 600.0 inhabitants per square mile (231.7/km^{2}). There were 38 housing units at an average density of 345.5 per square mile (133.4/km^{2}). The racial makeup of the city was 100.0% White. Hispanic or Latino of any race were 1.5% of the population.

There were 31 households, of which 29.0% had children under the age of 18 living with them, 48.4% were married couples living together, 3.2% had a female householder with no husband present, 9.7% had a male householder with no wife present, and 38.7% were non-families. 38.7% of all households were made up of individuals, and 19.4% had someone living alone who was 65 years of age or older. The average household size was 2.13 and the average family size was 2.68.

The median age in the city was 46.5 years. 22.7% of residents were under the age of 18; 4.5% were between the ages of 18 and 24; 15.1% were from 25 to 44; 34.8% were from 45 to 64; and 22.7% were 65 years of age or older. The gender makeup of the city was 51.5% male and 48.5% female.

=== 2000 census ===
As of the census of 2000, there were 87 people, 41 households, and 28 families residing in the city. The population density was 811.2 inhabitants per square mile (313.2/km^{2}). There were 47 housing units at an average density of 438.2 per square mile (169.2/km^{2}). The racial makeup of the city was 95.40% White, and 4.60% from two or more races.

There were 41 households, out of which 24.4% had children under the age of 18 living with them, 61.0% were married couples living together, 7.3% had a female householder with no husband present, and 31.7% were non-families. 29.3% of all households were made up of individuals, and 12.2% had someone living alone who was 65 years of age or older. The average household size was 2.12 and the average family size was 2.57.

In the city, the population was spread out, with 20.7% under the age of 18, 2.3% from 18 to 24, 29.9% from 25 to 44, 23.0% from 45 to 64, and 24.1% who were 65 years of age or older. The median age was 44 years. For every 100 females, there were 112.2 males. For every 100 females age 18 and over, there were 97.1 males.

The median income for a household in the city was $26,667, and the median income for a family was $30,893. Males had a median income of $26,042 versus $20,833 for females. The per capita income for the city was $16,862. There were 8.7% of families and 9.5% of the population living below the poverty line, including no under eighteens and none of those over 64.

== Education ==
The community is served by Marysville USD 364 public school district.

== Notable people ==
- Thomas Olmsted, Roman Catholic bishop
