= Herkimer, Kansas =

Unincorporated community in Marshall County, Kansas

- CDP
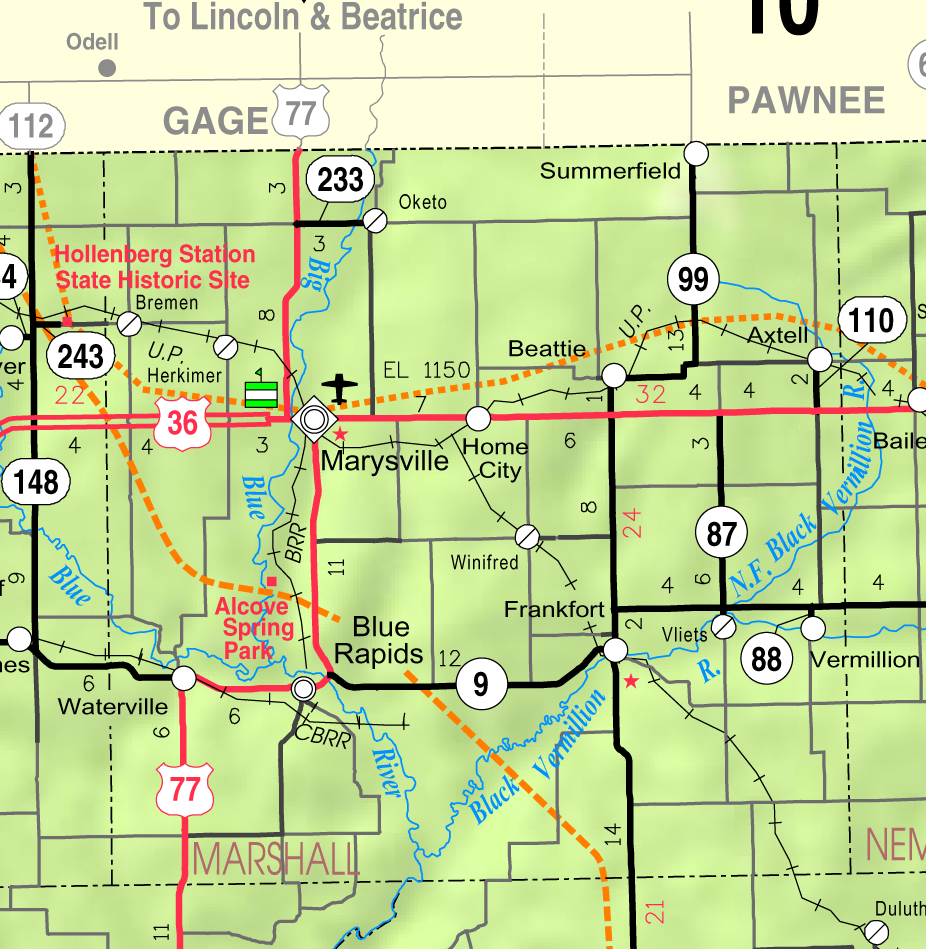
- KDOT map of Marshall County (legend)

- Location within Kansas Location within the United States
- Coordinates: 39°53′28″N 96°42′40″W
- Country: United States
- State: Kansas
- County: Marshall
- Named for: Herkimer, New York
- Elevation: 1,250 ft (380 m)

Population (2020)
  - Total: 54
- Time zone: UTC-6 (CST)
  - Summer (DST): UTC-5 (CDT)
- Area code: 785
- FIPS code: 20-31425
- GNIS ID: 472670

Herkimer is a census-designated place (CDP) in Marshall County, Kansas, United States. As of the 2020 census, the population was 54.

== History ==
Herkimer was named after Herkimer, New York. A post office was opened in Herkimer in 1878, and remained in operation until it was discontinued in 1974.

== Demographics ==
Historical population
Census	Pop.	Note	%±
2020	54		—
U.S. Decennial Census

The 2020 United States census counted 54 people, 26 households, and 22 families in Herkimer. The population density was 57.6 per square mile (22.2/km^{2}). There were 26 housing units at an average density of 27.7 per square mile (10.7/km^{2}). The racial makeup was 98.15% (53) white or European American (98.15% non-Hispanic white), 0.0% (0) black or African-American, 0.0% (0) Native American or Alaska Native, 0.0% (0) Asian, 0.0% (0) Pacific Islander or Native Hawaiian, 0.0% (0) from other races, and 1.85% (1) from two or more races. Hispanic or Latino of any race was 0.0% (0) of the population.

Of the 26 households, 15.4% had children under the age of 18; 84.6% were married couples living together; 0.0% had a female householder with no spouse or partner present. 15.4% of households consisted of individuals and 3.8% had someone living alone who was 65 years of age or older. The average household size was 2.4 and the average family size was 3.0. The percent of those with a bachelor's degree or higher was estimated to be 0.0% of the population, with a 11% margin of error.

14.8% of the population was under the age of 18, 1.9% from 18 to 24, 25.9% from 25 to 44, 11.1% from 45 to 64, and 46.3% who were 65 years of age or older. The median age was 60.3 years. For every 100 females, there were 116.0 males. For every 100 females ages 18 and older, there were 130.0 males.

The 2016–2020 5-year American Community Survey estimates show that the median household income was $76,500 (with a margin of error of +/- $23,596). The median income for those above 16 years old was $31,563 (+/- $31,075). Approximately, 0.0% of families and 13.2% of the population were below the poverty line, including 0.0% of those under the age of 18 and 50.0% of those ages 65 or over.

== Education ==
The community is served by Marysville USD 364 public school district.
