= Bremen, Kansas =

Unincorporated community in Marshall County, Kansas

- CDP
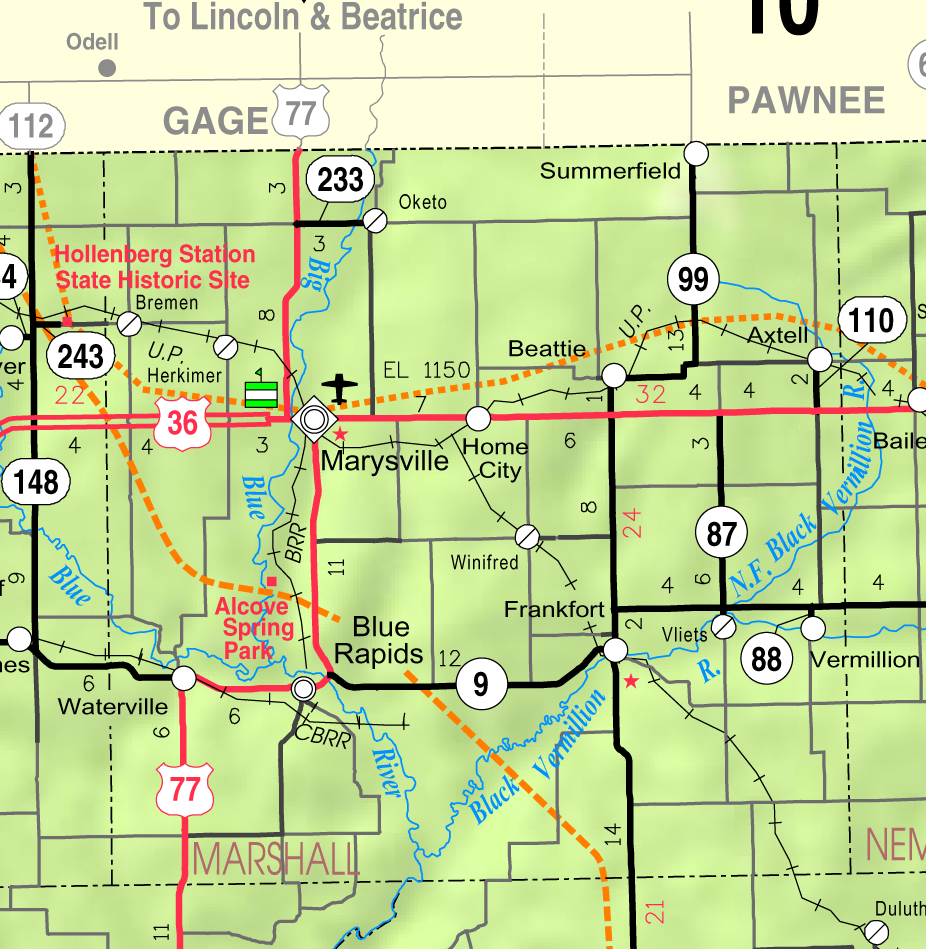
- KDOT map of Marshall County (legend)

- Location within Kansas Location within the United States
- Coordinates: 39°54′05″N 96°47′21″W
- Country: United States
- State: Kansas
- County: Marshall
- Founded: 1886
- Platted: 1886
- Named for: Bremen, Germany
- Elevation: 1,332 ft (406 m)

Population (2020)
  - Total: 51
- Time zone: UTC-6 (CST)
  - Summer (DST): UTC-5 (CDT)
- ZIP Code: 66412
- Area code: 785
- FIPS code: 20-08300
- GNIS ID: 472665

Bremen is a census-designated place (CDP) in Marshall County, Kansas, United States. As of the 2020 census, the population was 51.

== History ==
Bremen was laid out in 1886 by Henry Brenneke, a native of Bremen, Germany.

== Demographics ==
Historical population
Census	Pop.	Note	%±
2020	51		—
U.S. Decennial Census

The 2020 United States census counted 51 people, 17 households, and 16 families in Bremen. The population density was 30.2 per square mile (11.7/km^{2}). There were 25 housing units at an average density of 14.8 per square mile (5.7/km^{2}). The racial makeup was 94.12% (48) white or European American (94.12% non-Hispanic white), 0.0% (0) black or African-American, 0.0% (0) Native American or Alaska Native, 0.0% (0) Asian, 0.0% (0) Pacific Islander or Native Hawaiian, 0.0% (0) from other races, and 5.88% (3) from two or more races. Hispanic or Latino of any race was 0.0% (0) of the population.

Of the 17 households, 0.0% had children under the age of 18; 94.1% were married couples living together; 0.0% had a female householder with no spouse or partner present. 5.9% of households consisted of individuals and 5.9% had someone living alone who was 65 years of age or older. The average household size was 2.0 and the average family size was 2.3. The percent of those with a bachelor's degree or higher was estimated to be 7.8% of the population.

23.5% of the population was under the age of 18, 0.0% from 18 to 24, 13.7% from 25 to 44, 29.4% from 45 to 64, and 33.3% who were 65 years of age or older. The median age was 58.4 years. For every 100 females, there were 45.7 males. For every 100 females ages 18 and older, there were 44.4 males.

The 2016–2020 5-year American Community Survey estimates show that the median household income was $58,750 (with a margin of error of +/- $15,444). Approximately, 0.0% of families and 0.0% of the population were below the poverty line, including 0.0% of those under the age of 18 and 0.0% of those ages 65 or over.

== Economy ==
Bremen Farmers Mutual Insurance Company is the main employer in Bremen. Also, the community has a U.S. Post Office.

== Education ==
The community is served by Marysville USD 364 public school district.
