= Marysville USD 364 =

Public school district in Marysville, Kansas

Address
- 211 South 10th Street Marysville, Kansas, 66508; United States
- Coordinates: 39.83998°N 96.64588°W

District information
- Type: Public
- Grades: K to 12
- Schools: 2

Other information
- Website: usd364.org

Marysville USD 364 is a public unified school district headquartered in Marysville, Kansas, United States. The district includes the communities of Marysville, Beattie, Oketo, Bremen, Herkimer, Home, Marietta, and nearby rural areas.

== Schools ==
The school district operates the following schools:

- Marysville Junior/Senior High School
- Marysville Elementary School

== See also ==
- Kansas State Department of Education
- Kansas State High School Activities Association
- List of high schools in Kansas
- List of unified school districts in Kansas
