= Summerfield, Kansas =

City in Marshall County, Kansas

- City
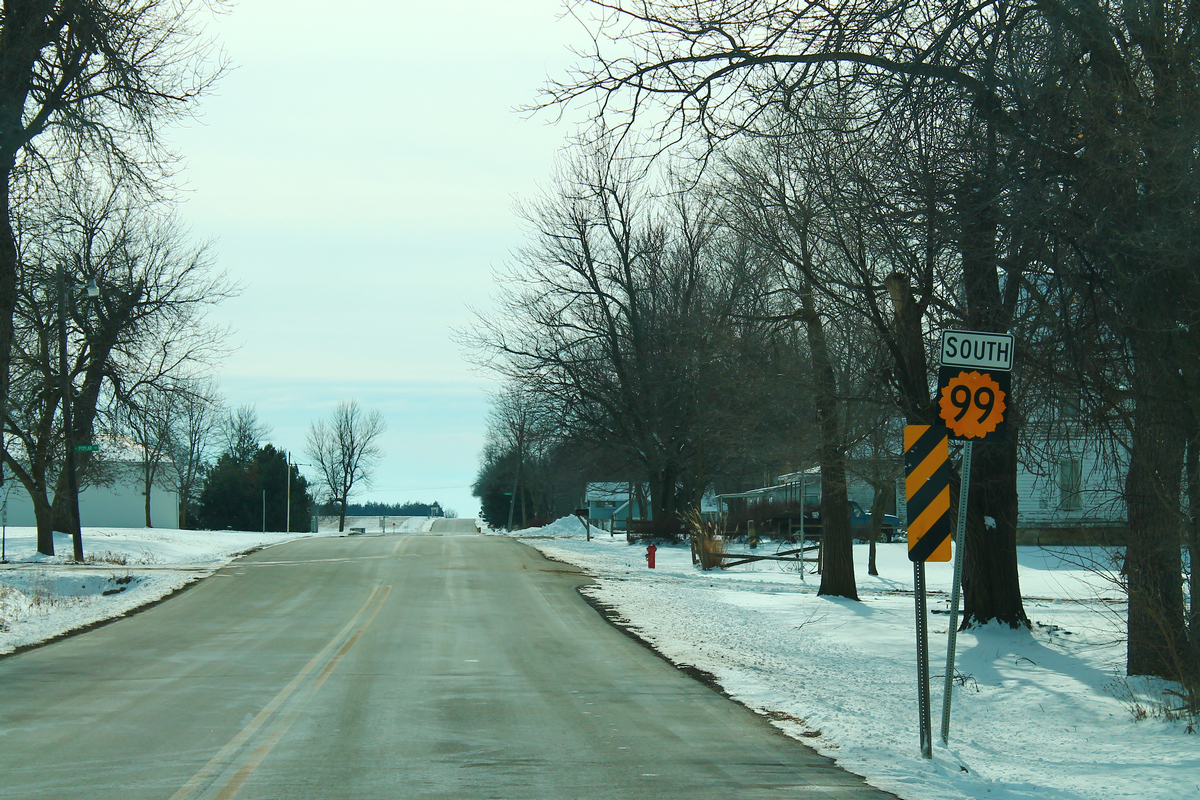
- Summerfield (Feb 2014)

- Location within Marshall County and Kansas

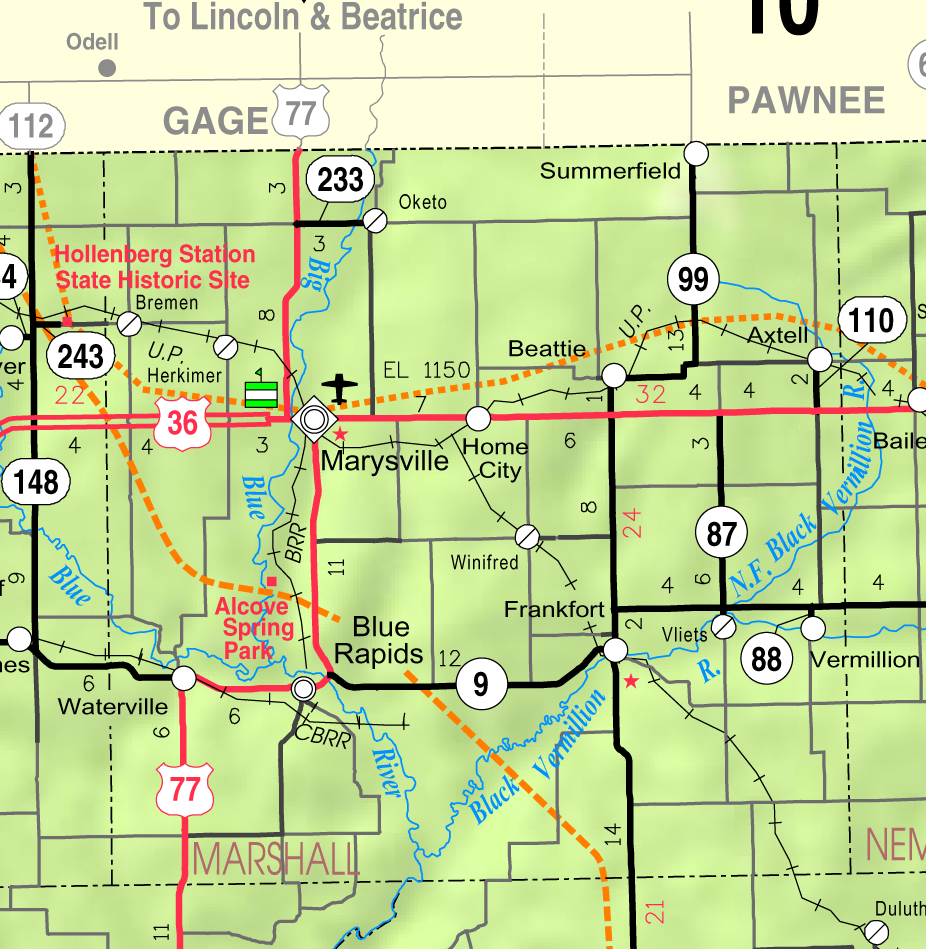
- KDOT map of Marshall County (legend)
- Coordinates: 39°59′49″N 96°20′57″W
- Country: United States
- State: Kansas
- County: Marshall
- Founded: about 1889
- Incorporated: 1889
- Named for: Elias Summerfield

Area
  - Total: 0.34 sq mi (0.89 km^{2})
  - Land: 0.34 sq mi (0.89 km^{2})
  - Water: 0 sq mi (0.00 km^{2})
- Elevation: 1,513 ft (461 m)

Population (2020)
  - Total: 125
  - Density: 360/sq mi (140/km^{2})
- Time zone: UTC-6 (CST)
  - Summer (DST): UTC-5 (CDT)
- ZIP Code: 66541
- Area code: 785
- FIPS code: 20-68950
- GNIS ID: 2396000
- Website: summerfieldkansas.com

Summerfield is a city in Marshall County, Kansas, United States. As of the 2020 census, the population of the city was 125. The Kansas-Nebraska state border is the northern edge of the city.

== History ==
Summerfield had its start in about 1889 by the building of the railroad through that territory. It was named for Elias Summerfield, a railroad official.

The first post office in Summerfield was established in February 1889.

== Geography ==
According to the United States Census Bureau, the city has a total area of 0.34 square miles (0.88 km^{2}), all land.

== Demographics ==
Historical population
Census	Pop.	Note	%±
1890	102		—
1900	505		395.1%
1910	554		9.7%
1920	539		−2.7%
1930	398		−26.2%
1940	396		−0.5%
1950	305		−23.0%
1960	237		−22.3%
1970	254		7.2%
1980	225		−11.4%
1990	169		−24.9%
2000	211		24.9%
2010	156		−26.1%
2020	125		−19.9%
U.S. Decennial Census

=== 2010 census ===
As of the census of 2010, there were 156 people, 79 households, and 41 families residing in the city. The population density was 458.8 inhabitants per square mile (177.1/km^{2}). There were 107 housing units at an average density of 314.7 per square mile (121.5/km^{2}). The racial makeup of the city was 98.1% White, 0.6% African American, and 1.3% from two or more races. Hispanic or Latino of any race were 1.3% of the population.

There were 79 households, of which 20.3% had children under the age of 18 living with them, 40.5% were married couples living together, 7.6% had a female householder with no husband present, 3.8% had a male householder with no wife present, and 48.1% were non-families. 39.2% of all households were made up of individuals, and 12.6% had someone living alone who was 65 years of age or older. The average household size was 1.97 and the average family size was 2.68.

The median age in the city was 51.2 years. 19.2% of residents were under the age of 18; 5.1% were between the ages of 18 and 24; 14.7% were from 25 to 44; 39% were from 45 to 64; and 21.8% were 65 years of age or older. The gender makeup of the city was 47.4% male and 52.6% female.

=== 2000 census ===
As of the census of 2000, there were 211 people, 75 households, and 53 families residing in the city. The population density was 629.8 inhabitants per square mile (243.2/km^{2}). There were 92 housing units at an average density of 274.6 per square mile (106.0/km^{2}). The racial makeup of the city was 99.05% White, 0.47% Native American, and 0.47% from two or more races.

There were 75 households, out of which 33.3% had children under the age of 18 living with them, 64.0% were married couples living together, 6.7% had a female householder with no husband present, and 29.3% were non-families. 26.7% of all households were made up of individuals, and 17.3% had someone living alone who was 65 years of age or older. The average household size was 2.48 and the average family size was 3.02.

In the city, the population was spread out, with 23.7% under the age of 18, 6.2% from 18 to 24, 19.9% from 25 to 44, 16.6% from 45 to 64, and 33.6% who were 65 years of age or older. The median age was 45 years. For every 100 females, there were 78.8 males. For every 100 females age 18 and over, there were 78.9 males.

The median income for a household in the city was $26,250, and the median income for a family was $31,875. Males had a median income of $19,375 versus $14,500 for females. The per capita income for the city was $17,046. About 7.1% of families and 11.8% of the population were below the poverty line, including 17.1% of those under the age of eighteen and 14.0% of those 65 or over.

== Education ==
The community is served by Prairie Hills USD 113 public school district. The school board voted to close Summerfield Elementary School at the end of the 2013-2014 school year.
