= Frankfort, Kansas =

City in Marshall County, Kansas

- City
- Location within Marshall County and Kansas

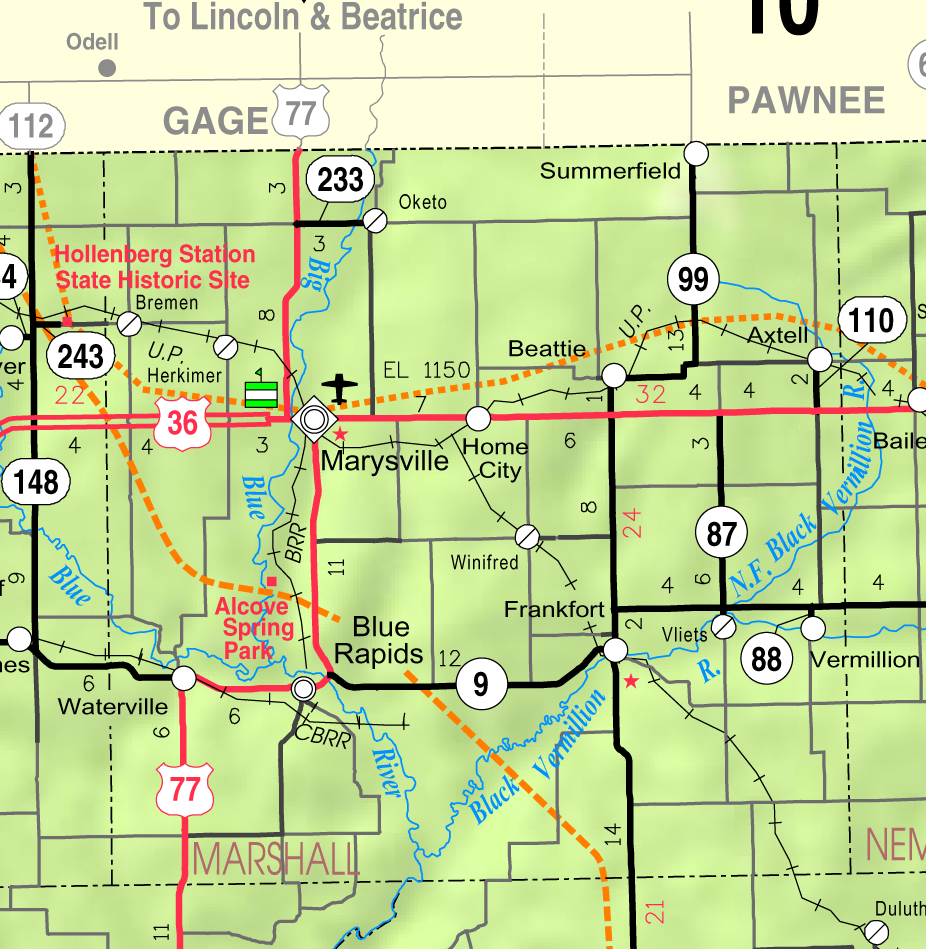
- KDOT map of Marshall County (legend)
- Coordinates: 39°42′14″N 96°25′01″W
- Country: United States
- State: Kansas
- County: Marshall
- Platted: 1867
- Incorporated: 1875
- Named for: Frank Schmidt

Area
  - Total: 1.01 sq mi (2.62 km^{2})
  - Land: 1.01 sq mi (2.61 km^{2})
  - Water: 0.0039 sq mi (0.01 km^{2})
- Elevation: 1,152 ft (351 m)

Population (2020)
  - Total: 730
  - Density: 720/sq mi (280/km^{2})
- Time zone: UTC-6 (CST)
  - Summer (DST): UTC-5 (CDT)
- ZIP Code: 66427
- Area code: 785
- FIPS code: 20-24275
- GNIS ID: 2394806
- Website: cityoffrankfort.org

Frankfort is a city in Marshall County, Kansas, United States. As of the 2020 census, the population of the city was 730.

== History ==
Frankfort was laid out in 1867 when the Central Branch Union Pacific Railroad was built through the area. The nearby post office of Nottingham, established in 1857, moved roughly a half-mile northwest to meet the railroad. It was named for Frank Schmidt, a member of the town company. Frankfort was incorporated as a city of the third class in 1875.

The town lost 32 men during World War II, more per capita than any other community in the USA.

== Geography ==
According to the United States Census Bureau, the city has a total area of 1.02 square miles (2.64 km^{2}), of which 1.01 square miles (2.62 km^{2}) is land and 0.01 square miles (0.03 km^{2}) is water.

== Demographics ==
Historical population
Census	Pop.	Note	%±
1890	1,053		—
1900	1,167		10.8%
1910	1,426		22.2%
1920	1,314		−7.9%
1930	1,346		2.4%
1940	1,243		−7.7%
1950	1,237		−0.5%
1960	1,106		−10.6%
1970	960		−13.2%
1980	1,038		8.1%
1990	927		−10.7%
2000	855		−7.8%
2010	726		−15.1%
2020	730		0.6%
U.S. Decennial Census

=== 2020 census ===
The 2020 United States census counted 730 people, 311 households, and 198 families in Frankfort. The population density was 724.9 per square mile (279.9/km^{2}). There were 348 housing units at an average density of 345.6 per square mile (133.4/km^{2}). The racial makeup was 97.4% (711) white or European American (96.85% non-Hispanic white), 0.14% (1) black or African-American, 0.41% (3) Native American or Alaska Native, 0.14% (1) Asian, 0.0% (0) Pacific Islander or Native Hawaiian, 0.14% (1) from other races, and 1.78% (13) from two or more races. Hispanic or Latino of any race was 0.82% (6) of the population.

Of the 311 households, 26.7% had children under the age of 18; 54.3% were married couples living together; 22.2% had a female householder with no spouse or partner present. 32.2% of households consisted of individuals and 14.8% had someone living alone who was 65 years of age or older. The average household size was 2.3 and the average family size was 2.9. The percent of those with a bachelor's degree or higher was estimated to be 13.2% of the population.

22.2% of the population was under the age of 18, 6.8% from 18 to 24, 23.0% from 25 to 44, 21.2% from 45 to 64, and 26.7% who were 65 years of age or older. The median age was 42.8 years. For every 100 females, there were 100.0 males. For every 100 females ages 18 and older, there were 105.1 males.

The 2016–2020 5-year American Community Survey estimates show that the median household income was $59,833 (with a margin of error of +/- $8,200) and the median family income was $82,969 (+/- $9,877). Males had a median income of $38,125 (+/- $5,178) versus $20,536 (+/- $9,584) for females. The median income for those above 16 years old was $30,347 (+/- $4,304). Approximately, 5.4% of families and 9.0% of the population were below the poverty line, including 6.0% of those under the age of 18 and 14.9% of those ages 65 or over.

=== 2010 census ===
As of the census of 2010, there were 726 people, 307 households, and 195 families residing in the city. The population density was 718.8 inhabitants per square mile (277.5/km^{2}). There were 363 housing units at an average density of 359.4 per square mile (138.8/km^{2}). The racial makeup of the city was 98.8% White, 0.6% African American, 0.1% Asian, and 0.6% from two or more races. Hispanic or Latino of any race were 1.2% of the population.

There were 307 households, of which 26.7% had children under the age of 18 living with them, 54.1% were married couples living together, 7.5% had a female householder with no husband present, 2.0% had a male householder with no wife present, and 36.5% were non-families. 33.2% of all households were made up of individuals, and 20.8% had someone living alone who was 65 years of age or older. The average household size was 2.22 and the average family size was 2.80.

The median age in the city was 47.7 years. 21.5% of residents were under the age of 18; 5.4% were between the ages of 18 and 24; 21.3% were from 25 to 44; 23.3% were from 45 to 64; and 28.4% were 65 years of age or older. The gender makeup of the city was 48.9% male and 51.1% female.

=== 2000 census ===
As of the census of 2000, there were 855 people, 367 households, and 230 families residing in the city. The population density was 842.2 inhabitants per square mile (325.2/km^{2}). There were 411 housing units at an average density of 404.8 per square mile (156.3/km^{2}). The racial makeup of the city was 98.25% White, 0.35% African American, 0.12% Native American, 0.12% Pacific Islander, and 1.17% from two or more races. Hispanic or Latino of any race were 0.35% of the population.

There were 367 households, out of which 24.8% had children under the age of 18 living with them, 55.0% were married couples living together, 4.4% had a female householder with no husband present, and 37.1% were non-families. 34.3% of all households were made up of individuals, and 24.5% had someone living alone who was 65 years of age or older. The average household size was 2.19 and the average family size was 2.81.

In the city, the population was spread out, with 20.2% under the age of 18, 8.0% from 18 to 24, 18.7% from 25 to 44, 19.5% from 45 to 64, and 33.6% who were 65 years of age or older. The median age was 46 years. For every 100 females, there were 88.3 males. For every 100 females age 18 and over, there were 85.8 males.

The median income for a household in the city was $28,269, and the median income for a family was $34,545. Males had a median income of $25,167 versus $19,375 for females. The per capita income for the city was $16,078. About 6.8% of families and 10.5% of the population were below the poverty line, including 11.3% of those under age 18 and 16.7% of those age 65 or over.

== Education ==
The community and nearby rural areas are served by Vermillion USD 380 public school district.

The Frankfort Wildcats won the Kansas State High School boys basketball class 2A championship in 1973 and the class 1A DII championship in 2012. Frankfort football teams have brought home state titles in 1983 in Class 1A, as well as 1996 in Class 2-1A. Both teams were coached by Larry Schroeder, a member of the KSHSAA Hall of Fame. Frankfort also won the 1A volleyball state championship in both 1986 and 2009.
