= Marysville, Kansas =

City in Marshall County, Kansas

- City and County seat
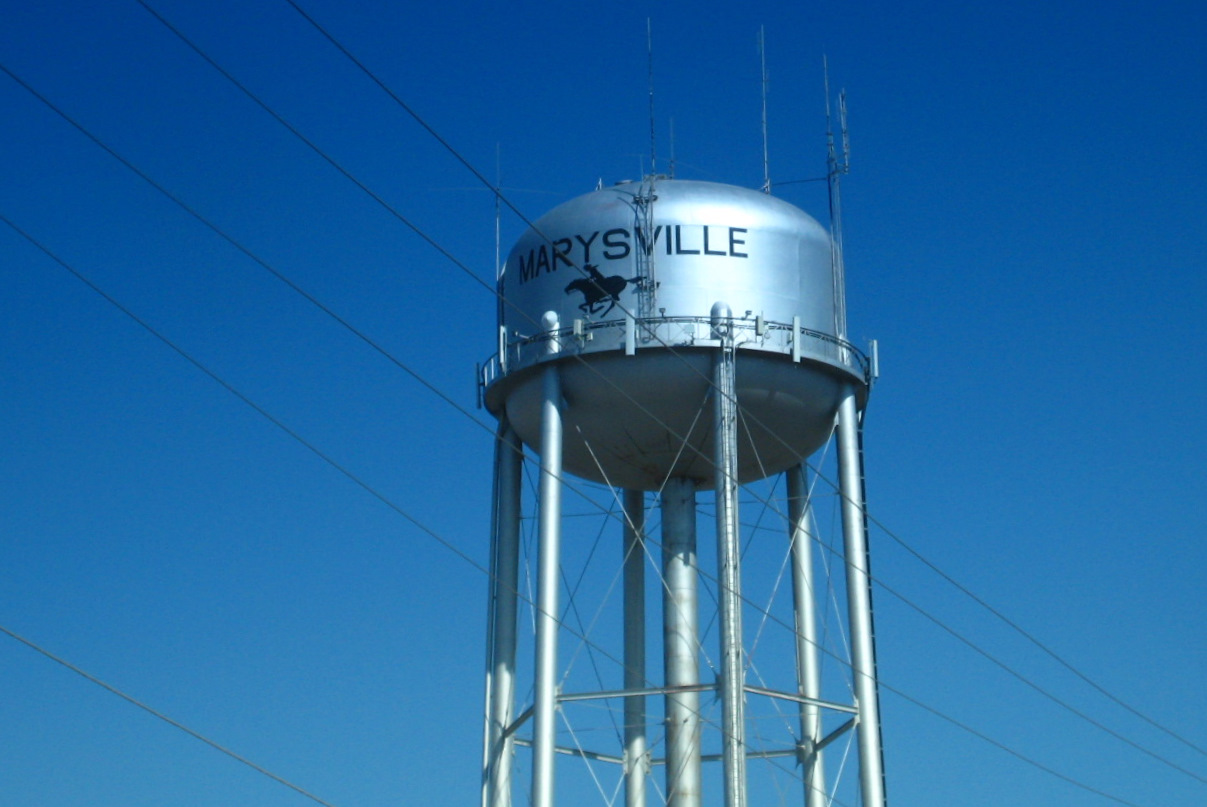
- Marysville water tower (2009)

- Location within Marshall County and Kansas

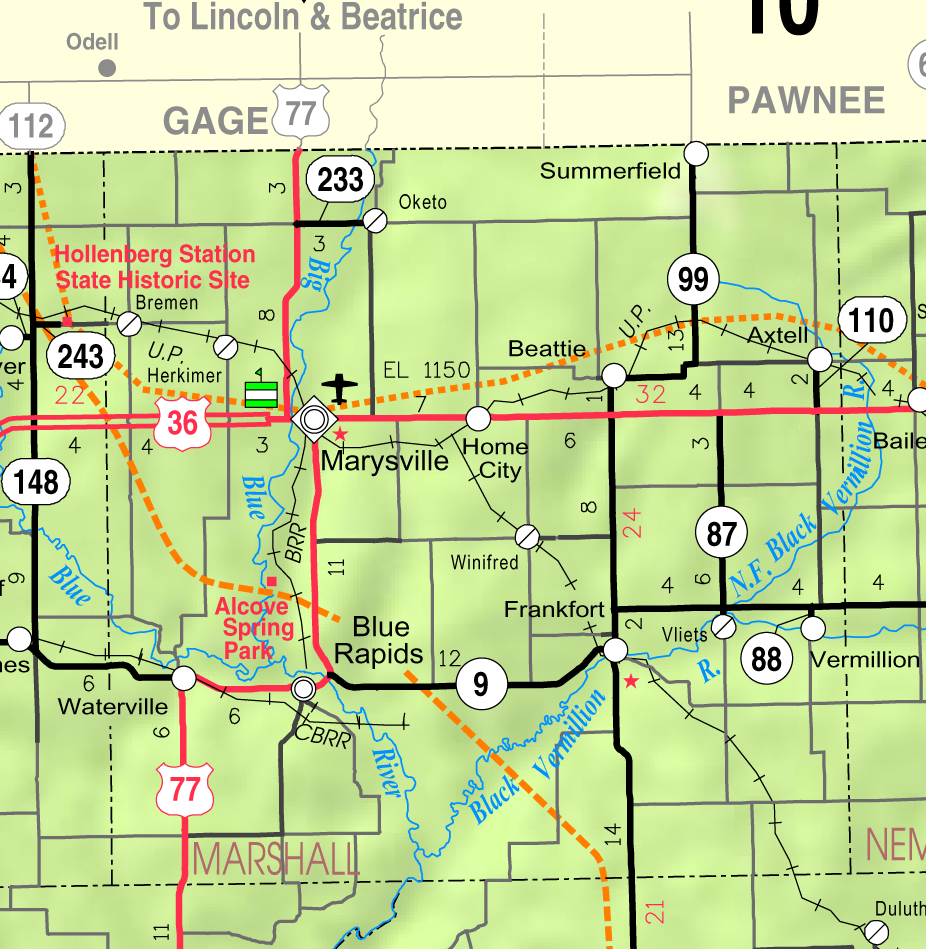
- KDOT map of Marshall County (legend)
- Coordinates: 39°50′35″N 96°38′19″W
- Country: United States
- State: Kansas
- County: Marshall
- Platted: 1855
- Incorporated: 1861

Area
  - Total: 4.61 sq mi (11.94 km^{2})
  - Land: 4.58 sq mi (11.86 km^{2})
  - Water: 0.031 sq mi (0.08 km^{2})
- Elevation: 1,234 ft (376 m)

Population (2020)
  - Total: 3,447
  - Density: 752.8/sq mi (290.6/km^{2})
- Time zone: UTC-6 (CST)
  - Summer (DST): UTC-5 (CDT)
- ZIP Codes: 66508, 66555
- Area code: 785
- FIPS code: 20-45050
- GNIS ID: 485620
- Website: cityofmarysvilleks.com

Marysville is a city in and the county seat of Marshall County, Kansas, United States. As of the 2020 census, the population of the city was 3,447.

== History ==
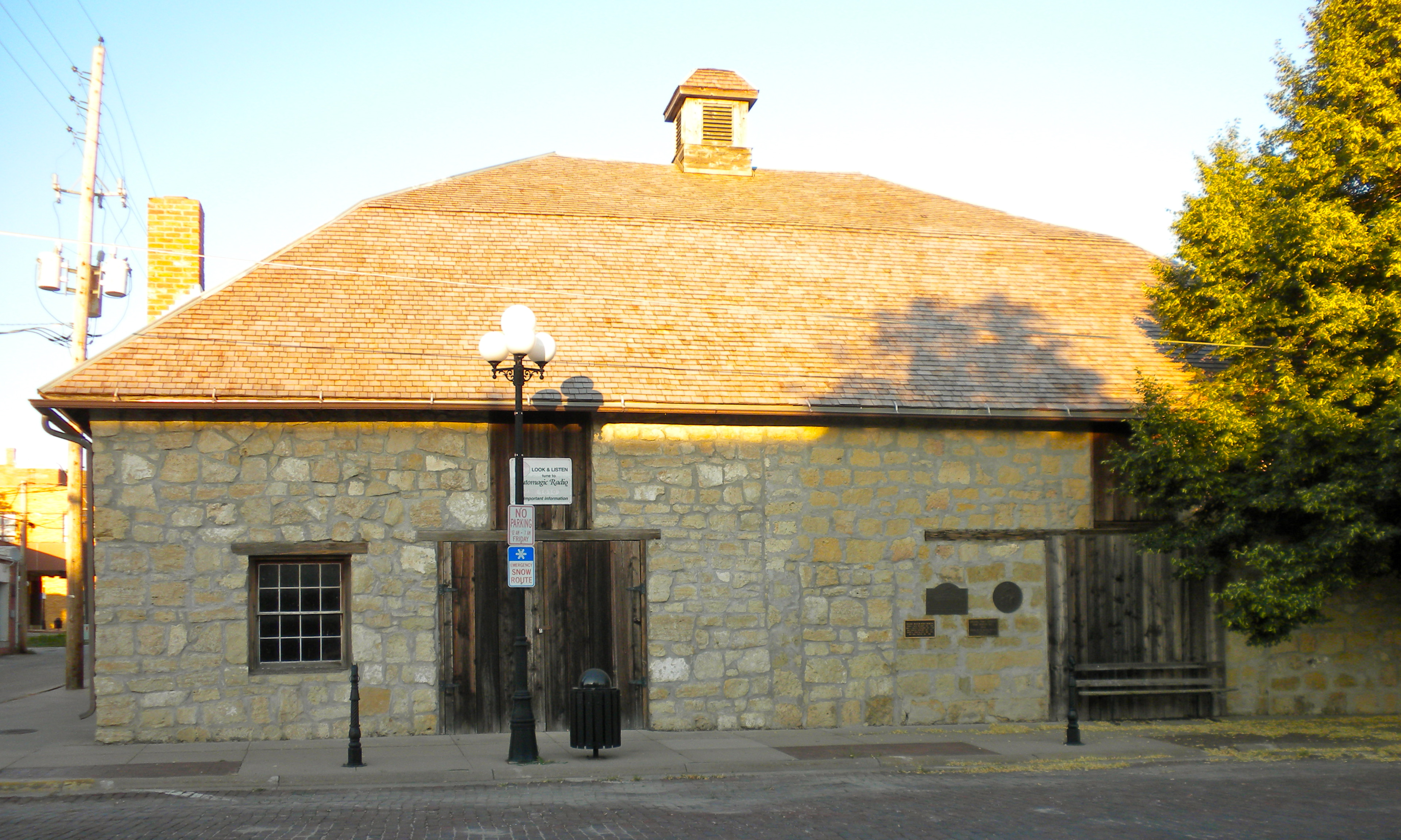
Pony Express Station (2010)

Marysville was laid out in 1855 by Francis J. Marshall, and designated in that same year the county seat. It was incorporated as a city in 1861.

Marysville was located on the Oregon Trail and the route of the Pony Express, the St. Joe Road, the Overland Stage, The Military Road, and the Otoe-Missouria Trail. British explorer Richard Francis Burton en route to California in 1860 noted: "Passing by Marysville, in old maps Palmetto City, a country-town which thrives by selling whiskey to ruffians of all descriptions ..." The old Pony Express Station still stands in downtown Marysville. In Beyond the Mississippi (1867), Albert D. Richardson, who passed through Marysville in 1860, wrote that the town—which was named after the Border Ruffian Marshall's wife—"had 50 houses and was famed for whisky and shooting affrays."

Marysville owed much of its prosperity to the Union Pacific Railroad, which became a major employer. But as the city grew along the railroad most of the community was across the tracks from a good part of downtown. As rail traffic increased, vehicular delays were estimated at 7.5 to 8 hours per day at the five grade crossings, which also affected emergency vehicles. In 2006 the main line was moved out of the center of town to a bypass to the south and west, with grade separations for US-36 and US-77.

Marysville is also known as the "Black Squirrel City" due to an isolated community of all-black squirrels that make their homes in the town. The squirrels are said to be the result of escapees from a traveling circus.

== Geography ==
Marysville is located in northeastern Kansas near the Nebraska border, approximately 75 miles (120 km) northwest of the Kansas capital of Topeka and 67 miles (108 km) south of Lincoln, Nebraska. According to the United States Census Bureau, the city has a total area of 4.62 square miles (11.97 km^{2}), of which 4.58 square miles (11.86 km^{2}) is land and 0.04 square miles (0.10 km^{2}) is water.

=== Climate ===
Climate data for Marysville, Kansas (1991–2020 normals, extremes 1950–present)
Month	Jan	Feb	Mar	Apr	May	Jun	Jul	Aug	Sep	Oct	Nov	Dec	Year
Record high °F (°C)	71 (22)	84 (29)	92 (33)	97 (36)	102 (39)	108 (42)	112 (44)	110 (43)	109 (43)	97 (36)	87 (31)	74 (23)	112 (44)
Mean maximum °F (°C)	60.4 (15.8)	67.4 (19.7)	79.2 (26.2)	86.6 (30.3)	91.5 (33.1)	96.0 (35.6)	100.4 (38.0)	99.4 (37.4)	94.8 (34.9)	88.8 (31.6)	74.0 (23.3)	63.6 (17.6)	102.1 (38.9)
Mean daily maximum °F (°C)	38.2 (3.4)	43.3 (6.3)	55.3 (12.9)	65.7 (18.7)	75.7 (24.3)	85.6 (29.8)	90.2 (32.3)	88.6 (31.4)	81.2 (27.3)	69.2 (20.7)	54.2 (12.3)	42.2 (5.7)	65.8 (18.8)
Daily mean °F (°C)	26.7 (−2.9)	31.3 (−0.4)	42.5 (5.8)	52.8 (11.6)	63.7 (17.6)	73.9 (23.3)	78.5 (25.8)	76.3 (24.6)	67.9 (19.9)	55.3 (12.9)	41.9 (5.5)	30.9 (−0.6)	53.5 (11.9)
Mean daily minimum °F (°C)	15.3 (−9.3)	19.3 (−7.1)	29.6 (−1.3)	40.0 (4.4)	51.6 (10.9)	62.1 (16.7)	66.8 (19.3)	64.1 (17.8)	54.5 (12.5)	41.4 (5.2)	29.5 (−1.4)	19.5 (−6.9)	41.1 (5.1)
Mean minimum °F (°C)	−5.8 (−21.0)	−0.4 (−18.0)	9.9 (−12.3)	23.3 (−4.8)	35.3 (1.8)	48.3 (9.1)	54.5 (12.5)	52.0 (11.1)	37.5 (3.1)	24.0 (−4.4)	13.2 (−10.4)	0.8 (−17.3)	−9.6 (−23.1)
Record low °F (°C)	−21 (−29)	−28 (−33)	−18 (−28)	6 (−14)	15 (−9)	35 (2)	42 (6)	44 (7)	27 (−3)	11 (−12)	−3 (−19)	−27 (−33)	−28 (−33)
Average precipitation inches (mm)	0.83 (21)	1.07 (27)	2.11 (54)	3.09 (78)	4.86 (123)	4.91 (125)	4.65 (118)	3.61 (92)	3.28 (83)	2.52 (64)	1.50 (38)	1.17 (30)	33.60 (853)
Average snowfall inches (cm)	4.9 (12)	4.3 (11)	1.5 (3.8)	0.7 (1.8)	0.0 (0.0)	0.0 (0.0)	0.0 (0.0)	0.0 (0.0)	0.0 (0.0)	0.1 (0.25)	1.0 (2.5)	3.3 (8.4)	15.8 (40)
Average precipitation days (≥ 0.01 in)	4.7	5.2	6.8	9.3	11.3	11.1	10.5	10.1	8.9	7.7	5.8	5.0	96.4
Average snowy days (≥ 0.1 in)	2.1	2.1	0.9	0.2	0.0	0.0	0.0	0.0	0.0	0.2	0.6	1.3	7.4
Source: NOAA

== Demographics ==
Historical population
Census	Pop.	Note	%±
1860	171		—
1870	300		75.4%
1880	1,249		316.3%
1890	1,913		53.2%
1900	2,006		4.9%
1910	2,260		12.7%
1920	3,048		34.9%
1930	4,013		31.7%
1940	4,055		1.0%
1950	3,866		−4.7%
1960	4,143		7.2%
1970	3,588		−13.4%
1980	3,670		2.3%
1990	3,359		−8.5%
2000	3,271		−2.6%
2010	3,294		0.7%
2020	3,447		4.6%
U.S. Decennial Census

=== 2020 census ===
As of the 2020 census, Marysville had a population of 3,447 people, with 1,458 households and 841 families. The population density was 755.6 per square mile (291.7/km^{2}). There were 1,682 housing units at an average density of 368.7 per square mile (142.4/km^{2}).

The median age was 40.0 years. 25.4% of residents were under the age of 18, 6.8% were from 18 to 24, 22.9% were from 25 to 44, 23.8% were from 45 to 64, and 21.0% were 65 years of age or older. For every 100 females, there were 98.0 males, and for every 100 females age 18 and over, there were 94.0 males age 18 and over.

Of the 1,458 households, 27.8% had children under the age of 18 living in them. Of all households, 44.2% were married-couple households, 21.5% were households with a male householder and no spouse or partner present, and 29.0% were households with a female householder and no spouse or partner present. About 37.5% of households were made up of individuals and 17.3% had someone living alone who was 65 years of age or older. The average household size was 2.2 and the average family size was 3.0.

There were 1,682 housing units, of which 13.3% were vacant. The homeowner vacancy rate was 4.7% and the rental vacancy rate was 13.9%. 0.0% of residents lived in urban areas, while 100.0% lived in rural areas.

Racial composition as of the 2020 census
Race	Number	Percent
White	3,144	91.2%
Black or African American	27	0.8%
American Indian and Alaska Native	8	0.2%
Asian	31	0.9%
Native Hawaiian and Other Pacific Islander	2	0.1%
Some other race	22	0.6%
Two or more races	213	6.2%
Hispanic or Latino (of any race)	136	3.9%

Non-Hispanic White residents were 90.14% of the population.

=== Educational attainment ===
The percent of those with a bachelor's degree or higher was estimated to be 16.9% of the population.

=== Income and poverty ===
The 2016–2020 5-year American Community Survey estimates show that the median household income was $44,037 (with a margin of error of +/- $9,276) and the median family income was $64,099 (+/- $9,753). Males had a median income of $40,000 (+/- $9,158) versus $29,180 (+/- $4,513) for females. The median income for those above 16 years old was $32,774 (+/- $6,479). Approximately, 7.3% of families and 11.9% of the population were below the poverty line, including 21.5% of those under the age of 18 and 7.9% of those ages 65 or over.

=== 2010 census ===
As of the census of 2010, there were 3,294 people, 1,468 households, and 859 families living in the city. The population density was 719.2 inhabitants per square mile (277.7/km^{2}). There were 1,646 housing units at an average density of 359.4 per square mile (138.8/km^{2}). The racial makeup of the city was 96.7% White, 0.3% African American, 0.2% Native American, 0.6% Asian, 0.8% from other races, and 1.4% from two or more races. Hispanic or Latino of any race were 2.6% of the population.

There were 1,468 households, of which 27.2% had children under the age of 18 living with them, 46.1% were married couples living together, 8.4% had a female householder with no husband present, 4.0% had a male householder with no wife present, and 41.5% were non-families. 38.1% of all households were made up of individuals, and 18.1% had someone living alone who was 65 years of age or older. The average household size was 2.20 and the average family size was 2.89.

The median age in the city was 41.8 years. 24% of residents were under the age of 18; 7% were between the ages of 18 and 24; 22.2% were from 25 to 44; 26.4% were from 45 to 64; and 20.5% were 65 years of age or older. The gender makeup of the city was 47.9% male and 52.1% female.

== Education ==
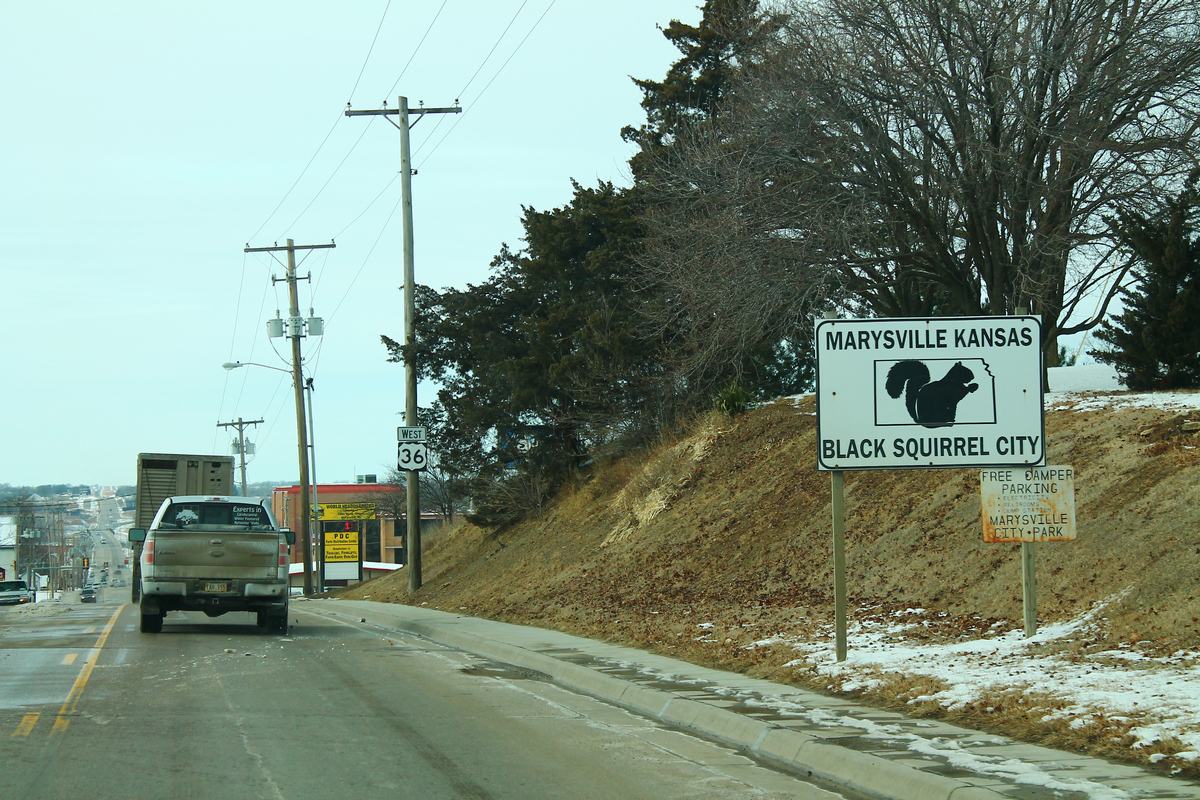
Black Squirrel City sign (2014)

The community is served by Marysville USD 364 public school district.

== Notable people ==
- Helen Arnold, Oklahoma House of Representatives legislator (1976–82)
- Kenneth Dam, Deputy Secretary of State (1982–85)
- Brian Duensing, professional baseball pitcher for ten seasons with three teams
- Ralph Elliott, accountant and developer of the Elliott Wave Theory
- Louis Hardin, a.k.a. Moondog, composer, musician and poet
- Michael McClure, poet and playwright
- Kendra Wecker, collegiate and professional basketball player

== See also ==
- KNDY (AM) and KNDY-FM - radio stations
