= Edna P. Amidon =

American educator

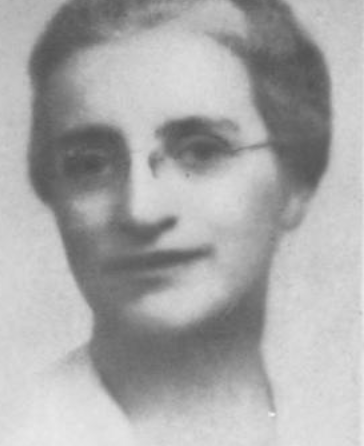
- Edna P. Amidon, from a 1938 publication of the US Department of the Interior
- Born: Edna Phyllis Amidon; 1895; Houston, Minnesota
- Died: 1982 (aged 86–87); Eugene, Oregon
- Occupations: Educator, federal official

Edna Phyllis Amidon (October 27, 1895 – October 4, 1982) was an American educator and federal official. She was chief of the Home Economics Education Service of the United States Office of Education from 1938 to 1964. In 1945, she helped found the Future Homemakers of America.

== Early life and education ==
Edna P. Amidon was born in Houston, Minnesota, the daughter of Edmund Perry Amidon and Mabel Julia Briggs Amidon. Both of her parents were also born in Minnesota. She studied at the University of Minnesota, where she earned a bachelor's degree, and a master's degree in 1927.

== Career ==
Amidon taught home economics as a young woman. She worked as a regional agent at the Federal Board for Vocational Education from 1929 until 1938, when she became chief of the Home Economics Education Service, succeeding Florence Fallgatter. She was chief of the service for 25 years, until she retired in 1964. As chief of the service, she visited college and high school home economics programs, worked with the United States War Department on educational rebuilding in Germany after World War II, and attended international conferences, including the 8th International Management Conference in Sweden (1947) and the International Seminar on Education and the Problems of Daily Living in France (1954). In 1948 she address the American Home Economics Association meeting in Minneapolis.

Amidon was one of the founders of the Future Homemakers of America in 1945, and chair of the FHA Advisory Board. She also actively supported the New Homemakers of America, a sister group serving Black students in states were racial segregation was enforced. She was also one of the original members of the Unitarian Universalist Church of Arlington. She was a member of Phi Delta Kappa, the American Home Economics Association and the American Vocational Association.

Amidon received the Outstanding Service Award from the American Vocational Association in 1953. The United States Department of Health, Education, and Welfare recognized her life's work with a Superior Service Award in 1963.

== Publications ==
- Space and Equipment for Homemaking Instruction: A Guide to Location and Arrangement of Homemaking Departments (1936, with Florence Fallgatter)
- "The Contribution of Home Economics Teachers to Health Education" (1941)
- Learning to Care for Children (1943, with Dorothy E. Bradbury)
- "Nutrition Education Through the Schools" (1944)
- Good Food and Nutrition for Young People and their Families (1946, with Dorothy E. Bradbury and Vivian V. Drenckhahn)
- "Home Economics Educators Take Stock" (1951)
- "A Better World Through Home Economics Education" (1952)
- "Can We Measure Up?" (1952)
- "Home Economics in a Scientific Age" (1958)
- "Contributions to Family Life Education by the Office of Education" (1958)
- "New explorations in home economics education" (1960)

== Personal life ==
Amidon retired to Eugene, Oregon. She died in 1982, at age 86. Her papers are in the collection of Oregon State University Libraries.
