= Josephine Berry =

Josephine Berry is the name of:

- Jo Berry (actress) (Josephine Bibit Berry, born 1994), Filipino actress
- Josephine Thorndike Berry (1871–1945), American educator and home economist
- Joséphine Berry (born 1992), star of I, Cesar and 22 Bullets

== See also ==
- Jo Berry (Joanna Cynthia Berry, born 1957), British peace activist and public speaker
