= University of Kentucky College of Agriculture, Food, and Environment =

Agricultural school of the University of Kentucky

Coordinates: 38.028893°N 84.509295°W

University of Kentucky Martin-Gatton College of Agriculture, Food, and Environment
- Established: 1865 as the Agricultural and Mechanical College of the Kentucky University
- Affiliations: University of Kentucky
- Dean: Laura Stephenson
- Faculty: 313
- Students: 3,000
- Location: (United States) Lexington, KY, USA
- Website: www.ca.uky.edu

The University of Kentucky Martin-Gatton College of Agriculture, Food and Environment is a public agricultural college at the University of Kentucky. The college was renamed the College of Agriculture, Food, and Environment on July 1, 2013. The name change incorporates the college's expanded role that occurred with the merger of the College of Human Environmental Sciences into the College of Agriculture. The college's research, teaching and outreach programs encompass farms, forests, food, fiber, families and communities. On May 25, 2023, the college announced a $100-million gift from late University of Kentucky alum and former trustee Carol Martin “Bill” Gatton. The college subsequently announced it would be renamed the Martin-Gatton College of Agriculture, Food and Environment pending approval from the UK Board of Trustees. As of June 16, 2023, the college is officially renamed the Martin-Gatton College of Agriculture, Food and Environment.

The University of Kentucky (UK), a land-grant university, has had agricultural education since the university's founding in 1865. Originally established by the Commonwealth of Kentucky as the Agricultural and Mechanical College of the newly created Kentucky University. The Kentucky University had been granted substantial initial funding from the federal government through the Morrill Land-Grant Act. In 1878 the state separated the Agricultural and Mechanical College from Kentucky University and the next year founded the Agricultural and Mechanical College of Kentucky under the leadership of James Kennedy Patterson. In 1908 the college was renamed State University, Lexington, Kentucky and in 1916, when the State University was renamed the University of Kentucky, the College of Agriculture remained a central point of identity for the institution across the state.

== Schools and departments ==
The college includes the School of Human Environmental Sciences. The School of Human Environmental Sciences was created on July 1, 2003, when the College of Human Environmental Sciences was returned to the College of Agriculture. Separating from the College of Agriculture in 1916 as a College of Home Economics (with Mary E. Sweeney as dean), the university merged it back into the College of Agriculture in 1917. Then in July 1967, the college created the School of Home Economics. On May 5, 1970, the school was promoted again to a college status and renamed the College of Human Environmental Sciences on January 22, 1991, with the addition of the Department of Interior Design (now situated within the UK College of Design). The college was merged into the College of Agriculture as the School of Human Environmental Sciences on July 1, 2003.

There are fourteen departments in the college offering 27 academic programs:

- Agricultural biotechnology
- Agricultural Economics
- Animal & Food Sciences
- Biosystems & Agricultural Engineering (in cooperation with the College of Engineering)
- Community & Leadership Development
- Entomology
- Forestry
- Horticulture
- Landscape Architecture
- Plant & Soil Sciences
- Plant Pathology
- Veterinary Science

School of Human Environmental Sciences

- Family Sciences
- Merchandising, Apparel & Textiles (now Retailing and Tourism Management)
- Nutrition & Food Science (now Dietetics and Human Nutrition)

In addition to the above departments, the college oversees the Kentucky Cooperative Extension Service (you can find the location of the KY County Extension Offices on an interactive map separated into seven districts). In partnership with Kentucky's other land-grant institution, Kentucky State University, Kentucky's agricultural extension service professionals communicate with and provide learning activities for Kentucky's rural communities. Some examples of programming are 4-H Youth Development, Water Pioneers community service projects, Horse College for recreational horse-owners, Kentucky Master Logger program, Nutrition Education Program, Master Clothing Volunteer Program, and Tax Preparers' Seminars.

The college also oversees the Kentucky Agriculture Experiment Station, a federally funded research and outreach initiative housed in the UK Agriculture Department and controlled by the state of Kentucky. Established in Fayette County in September 1885 after UK President Patterson and two Board of Trustees members attended a meeting with the U.S. Department of Agriculture. Already, other state colleges had established experiment stations as part of their agriculture departments, and this trend led to the Hatch Act of 1887 which provided funding for experiment stations associated with each state's agricultural colleges. The largest of these facilities is located at Princeton, Kentucky and is now known as the University of Kentucky Research and Education Center at Princeton.

Other units housed in the College of Agriculture, Food, and Environment are:

- University of Kentucky Arboretum, State Botanical Garden of Kentucky
- Kentucky Small Business Development Center
- Kentucky Nonprofit Network
- University of Kentucky Cooperative Extension Services
- University of Kentucky Herbarium

== Bibliography ==
- Smith, J. Allan (1980). The College of Agriculture of the University of Kentucky: Early and Middle Years, 1865-1951, in Two Volumes. Lexington KY: The College.
