= Shadeland, Lexington =

Shadeland
- Neighborhood of Lexington, Kentucky
- Interactive map of Shadeland
- Coordinates: 38.012°N 84.499°W
- Country: United States
- State: Kentucky
- County: Fayette
- City: Lexington

Area
  - Total: .126 sq mi (0.33 km^{2})
  - Water: 0 sq mi (0.0 km^{2})

Population (2000)
  - Total: 204
  - Density: 1,616/sq mi (624/km^{2})
- Time zone: UTC-5 (Eastern (EST))
  - Summer (DST): UTC-4 (EDT)
- ZIP code: 40502, 40503
- Area code: 859

Shadeland is a neighborhood in southeastern Lexington, Kentucky, United States. Its boundaries are the University of Kentucky Arboretum to the north and west, Glendover Road to the south, and Tates Creek Road to the east.

== Neighborhood statistics ==
- Area: 0.126 square miles (0.33 km^{2})
- Population: 204
- Population density: 1,616 people per square mile
- Median household income (2010): $60,264
