= Rait (disambiguation) =

Rait or RAIT may refer to:

- Rait, a village in Scotland
- Rait, a village in India
- Rait Castle in Scotland
- Ramrao Adik Institute of Technology (RAIT) in India
- RAIT Financial Trust in the United States
- Rait (name)
