= Southern Heights, Lexington =

Southern Heights
- Neighborhood of Lexington, Kentucky
- Interactive map of Southern Heights
- Coordinates: 38.013°N 84.511°W
- Country: United States
- State: Kentucky
- County: Fayette
- City: Lexington

Area
  - Total: .170 sq mi (0.44 km^{2})
  - Water: 0 sq mi (0.0 km^{2})

Population (2000)
  - Total: 470
  - Density: 2,760/sq mi (1,070/km^{2})
- Time zone: UTC-5 (Eastern (EST))
  - Summer (DST): UTC-4 (EDT)
- ZIP code: 40503
- Area code: 859

Southern Heights is a neighborhood in southwestern Lexington, Kentucky, United States. Its boundaries are the University of Kentucky Arboretum and Central Baptist Hospital to the north, Nicholasville Road to the west, and Edgemoor Drive/Blueberry Road to the south.

== Neighborhood statistics ==
- Area: 0.170 square miles (0.44 km^{2})
- Population: 470
- Population density: 2,760 people per square mile
- Median household income (2010): $54,850
