= Raigo (given name) =

Male given name

- Gender: Male
- Name day: 9 December

Origin
- Region of origin: Estonia

Other names
- Related names: Raid, Raido, Raidu, Raik, Raiko, Rait

Raigo is an Estonian masculine given name and may refer to:

- Raigo Mõlder (born 1982), Estonian rally co-driver
- Raigo Toompuu (born 1981), Estonian track and field athlete
