= Minna C. Denton =

American home economist

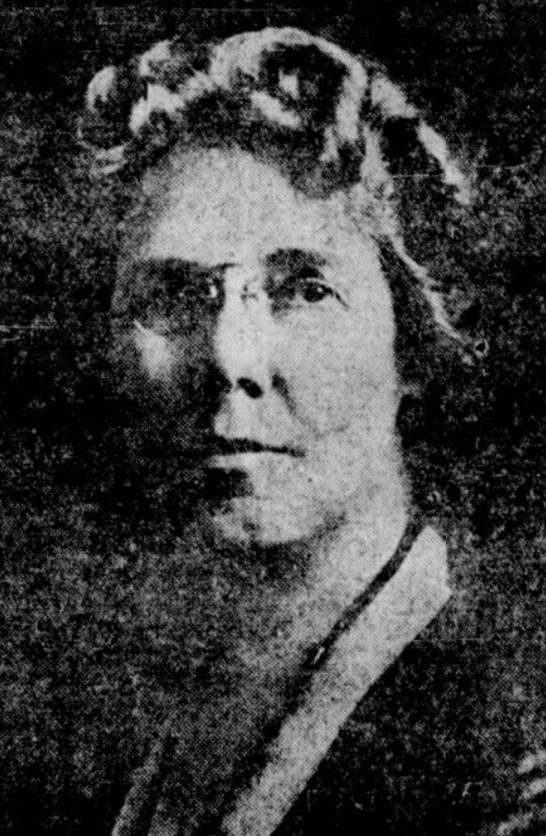
- Minna C. Denton, from a 1925 newspaper
- Born: January 16, 1873; Saline County, Kansas, U.S.
- Died: January 20, 1958 (aged 85); Fort Smith, Arkansas, U.S.
- Occupations: Home economist, food scientist, federal official

Minna Caroline Denton (January 16, 1873 – January 20, 1958) was an American home economist and food scientist. She was Assistant Chief of the Office of Home Economics in the United States Departrnent of Agriculture (USDA) in the 1920s. She also taught at Ohio State University, George Washington University, the University of Nebraska, Wittenberg University, and the University of Tampa.

== Early life and education ==
Denton was born in Saline County, Kansas, and raised in Fort Smith, Arkansas, the daughter of Lucius Gary Denton and Caroline Antonett Hubbard Denton. She graduated from the University of Michigan in 1900, and earned a Ph.D. from the University of Chicago in 1918. She was "the first person ever to receive the degree of doctor of philosophy in home economics," according to a later profile.

== Career ==
Denton taught school in Arkansas, and at Lewis Institute, Ohio State University and Milwaukee-Downer College. She was Assistant Chief of the Office of Home Economics in the USDA in the 1920s. She was chair of the Research Committee of the American Home Economics Association for five years.

After her time at the USDA, she taught at George Washington University Wittenberg College, and the University of Nebraska. In 1937, Denton was named head of the home economics department at the University of Tampa. She presented a paper at the World Federation of Education Associations meeting in Havana in 1941. She was a visiting lecturer at other schools, and spoke to professional and community groups about nutrition and other topics.

== Publications ==
Denton's work was published in scholarly journals including Journal of Education, School Science and Mathematics, The Scientific Monthly, Journal of Biological Chemistry, The Journal of Home Economics, and Industrial and Engineering Chemistry.

- "A Washington's Birthday Entertainment" (1896)
- "The Interfoliar Scales of Monocotyledonous Aquatics" (1902)
- "Suggestions from Bacteriology and Sanitation for the High School Course in Hygiene" (1907)
- "The Bed, Its Equipment, and Care" (1914)
- "The Desire for Food in Man" (1916)
- "Feeding Experiments with Raw and Boiled Carrots" (1918, with Emma Kohman)
- Changes in Food Value of Vegetables Due to Cooking (1919)
- "General Rules for Choosing Oven Temperatures" (1920)
- "The Relation of Alcohol Precipitate to Jellying Power of Citrus Pectin Extracts" (1923, with Ruth Johnstin)
- New and Old Ways of Cooking Vegetables (1932, pamphlet)

== Personal life ==
Denton lived with another home economist during her time in Washington, D.C. She traveled with colleagues Phoebe Buell and Ellen Clara Sabin in 1934, to Port Arthur in Canada. She died in 1958, at age 85, in Fort Smith, Arkansas.
