= Family and Consumer Sciences Research Journal =

- Discipline: Family studies
- Language: English
- Edited by: Sharon A. DeVaney

Publication details
- Former name(s): Home Economics Research Journal
- History: 1972–present
- Publisher: Wiley-Blackwell on behalf of the American Association of Family & Consumer Sciences
- Frequency: Quarterly

Standard abbreviations
- ISO 4: Fam. Consum. Sci. Res. J.

Indexing
- CODEN: FCSJEM
- ISSN: 1077-727X (print); 1552-3934 (web)
- LCCN: 95648101
- OCLC no.: 712800910

Links
- Journal homepage; Online access; Online archive

The Family and Consumer Sciences Research Journal is a quarterly peer-reviewed academic journal published by Wiley-Blackwell on behalf of the American Association of Family & Consumer Sciences. The journal was established in 1972 and published by SAGE Publications until 2010. The current editor-in-chief is Sharon A. DeVaney (Purdue University). The journal covers consumerism, human development and family studies.
