= Edna Noble White =

American

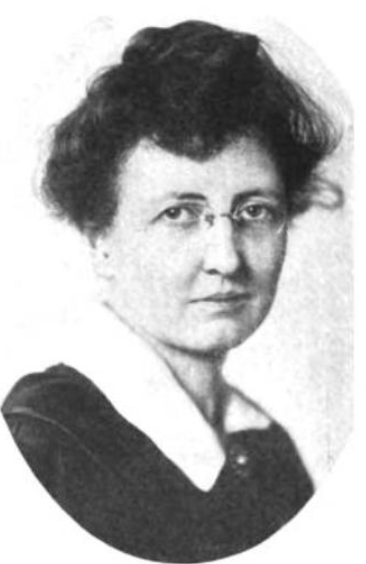
- Edna Noble White, from a 1918 publication
- Born: June 3, 1879; Fairmount, Illinois
- Died: May 4, 1954 (aged 74); Highland Park, Michigan
- Occupations: Educator, college professor, home economist
- Known for: Director of the Merrill-Palmer Institute from 1919 to 1947

Edna Noble White (June 3, 1879 – May 4, 1954) was an American educator. She was director of the Merrill-Palmer Institute in Detroit from 1919 to 1947, and president of the American Home Economics Association from 1918 to 1920. She was inducted into the Michigan Women's Hall of Fame in 1993.

== Early life and education ==
White was born in Fairmount, Illinois, the daughter of Alexander Lycurgus White and Angeline Eva Noble White. She graduated from the University of Illinois in 1906, with a degree in home economics.

== Career ==
White was a teacher as a young woman. She was a home economics professor at Ohio State College from 1908 to 1919. She co-wrote a textbook, A Study of Foods (1914). During World War I, she was active in leading food conservation programs in Ohio; "It has been a strange and rather trying experience to find ourselves grown fashionable over night," she wrote in 1918, about home economists in the war effort. From 1918 to 1920, she was president of the American Home Economics Association.

Beginning in 1919, White was founding director of the Merrill-Palmer Institute in Detroit, a position she held for 27 years, until her retirement in 1947. She created the Visiting Housekeepers program, and the Detroit Council for Youth Service. In 1921 she went to study early childhood programs in the United Kingdom with Margaret McMillan. In 1922 she founded Detroit's first laboratory nursery school.

From 1925 to 1937, White chaired the National Council of Parent Education. In 1929, she was a speaker at the Fifth World Conference of the New Education Fellowship, in Denmark. She was a voting delegate representing the United States at the founding of the Pan-Pacific Women's Association in Honolulu in 1930.

During the 1930s, she chaired the National Advisory Committee on Emergency Nursery Schools, a federal relief program to quickly expand access to early childhood education. She was also involved as an advisor with the Child Study Association of America, International Federation of Home and School, the Agricultural Missions Foundation, and the National Conference on Family Relations. She was a member of the Daughters of the American Revolution.

In retirement, White went to Greece to organize programs in family studies and early childhood education at Greek universities, and she worked to establish a gerontology program in Detroit.

== Publications ==
- "Meat" (1910)
- A Study of Foods (1914, with Ruth Aimee Wardall)
- "Meat and Meat Substitutes" (1914)
- "The Work of Women in the War" (1918)
- "The Merrill-Palmer School" (1922, with Mabel Rogers)
- "The Nursery School: A Teacher of Parents" (1926)
- "Preschool Health Problems" (1928)
- "The Objectives of the American Nursery School" (1928)
- "Parent Education in the Emergency" (1931)
- "Experiments in Family Consultation Centers" (1934)

== Personal life and legacy ==
White lived with her older sister Leila for most of her life, and helped to raise her brother's sons. She died in 1954, at the age of 74, in Highland Park, Michigan. Her papers are in the Merrill-Palmer Institute papers, in the Walter Reuther Archives at Wayne State University. In 1993, she was inducted into the Michigan Women's Hall of Fame. In 2013, she was named alongside Henry Ford, George W. Romney, and five other notable people, as one of the "Eight great, late state leaders we'd like to have back", an opinion feature in the Detroit Free Press, with the comment "who better to revamp the system than the woman who developed much of it?"
