= Valley Heights USD 498 =

Public school district in Waterville, Kansas

Address
- 121 E. Commercial St. Waterville, Kansas, 66548; United States
- Coordinates: 39.6923°N 96.7484°W

District information
- Type: Public
- Grades: K to 12
- Schools: 3

Other information
- Website: valleyheights.org

Valley Heights USD 498 is a public unified school district headquartered in Waterville, Kansas, United States. The district includes the communities of Waterville, Blue Rapids, and nearby rural areas.

== Schools ==
The school district operates the following schools:

- Valley Heights Jr/Sr High School - 2274 6th Rd. between Blue Rapids and Waterville
- Blue Rapids Elementary School - 508 Chestnut St. in Blue Rapids
- Waterville Elementary School - 307 East Lincoln St. in Waterville

== See also ==
- Kansas State Department of Education
- Kansas State High School Activities Association
- List of high schools in Kansas
- List of unified school districts in Kansas
