= Adelaide Steele Baylor =

American educator (1860–1935)

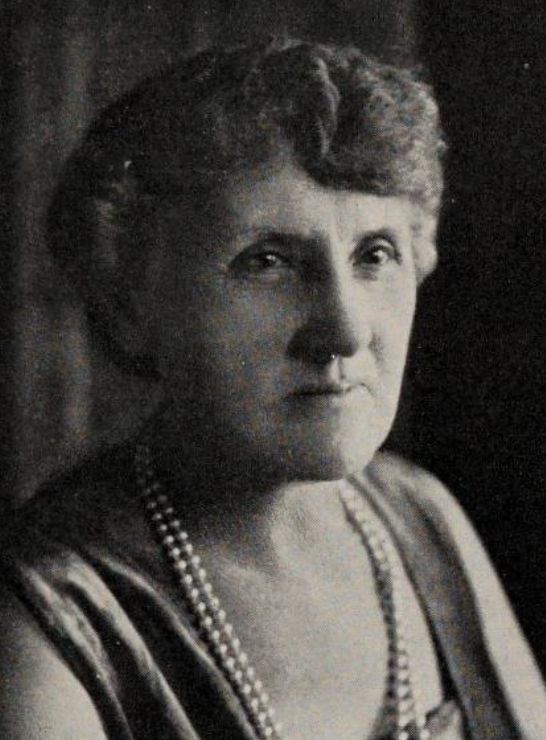
- Adelaide Steele Baylor, from a 1935 publication of the US Department of the Interior
- Born: October 14, 1860; Wabash, Indiana
- Died: December 18, 1935; Washington, D.C.
- Occupation(s): Educator, writer, state and federal official

Adelaide Steele Baylor (October 14, 1860 – December 18, 1935) was an American educator and school administrator. She was chief of the Home Economics Education Service in the United States Office of Education from 1923 to 1935.

== Early life and education ==
Baylor was born in Wabash, Indiana, the daughter of James Craig Baylor and Susannah Steele Baylor. She graduated from Wabash High School, attended the University of Michigan, earned bachelor's degree from the University of Chicago in 1897, and a master's degree from Columbia University in 1917. She received an honorary doctorate from the Stout Institute in Wisconsin in 1928.

== Career ==
Baylor was a teacher and school principal as a young woman. She was superintendent of schools for the city of Wabash, Indiana. She became assistant state superintendent of public instruction in Indiana, and state supervisor for home economics education. In 1913 she addressed the Tenth Conference of Superintendents and Principals of American Schools for the Deaf, when they met in Indianapolis.

For twelve years, from 1923 to 1935, Baylor was chief of the Home Economics Education Service in the United States Office of Education in Washington. She testified before congressional hearings on vocational education in 1928 and 1934. Her work involved extensive travel and public speaking; according to one account, "After 1923 she visited every state in the Union three or four times, Hawaii twice, and Puerto Rico once." She retired in October 1935, a few weeks before her death, and was succeeded by Florence Fallgatter as chief.

Baylor was secretary of the National Council of Education, vice-president of the National Education Association's Department of Elementary Education, and the first woman to hold a life membership in the American Vocational Association.

== Publications ==
Baylor wrote articles for professional publications, including Journal of Education and Journal of Home Economics. She also wrote textbooks and children's books, including Adventures of Miss Tabby Gray (1913) and Young America's First Book (1919).

- "English as She is Taught" (1910)
- Natural One-Book Geography (1911, with George L. Roberts and Frederick J. Breeze)
- "Consolidation of Rural Schools" (1912)
- Adventures of Miss Tabby Gray (1913, illustrated by Josephine Bruce)
- "Rural Education as an Element in the Strength of the Nation" (1917)
- Young America's First Book (1919, with Emma Colbert)
- "Training for the Vocation of Home Making" (1928)
- "Training Leaders for Education in Relation to Home and Family Life" (1931)

== Personal life and legacy ==
Baylor died in Washington, D.C. in 1935, aged 75 years. One of her speeches is included in the anthology Speeches of American women, 1920-1960 (2003). In 2014, she was in the first class of inductees into the Wabash City Schools Hall of Distinction.
