= Raitt =

Surname

Raitt is a surname. Notable people with the name include:

- Alan Raitt (1930–2006), British scholar of French literature
- Bay Raitt (fl. 1980s-present), United States digital modeler and animator, currently working in New Zealand
- Bonnie Raitt (born 1949), United States musician
- Douglas S. Raitt (died 1944), Scottish marine biologist
- Effie Raitt (1878–1945), American dietitian, head of home economics at the University of Washington
- George Raitt (1888–1960), Scottish athlete in football (played for Huddersfield Town)
- Herbert Raitt (1858–1935), British senior army officer
- Jill Raitt (1931–2025), American Roman Catholic theologian and professor
- John Raitt (1917–2005), United States actor and singer
- Lisa Raitt, PC, MP (born 1968), Canadian politician, the Conservative Party Member of Parliament for the riding of Halton
- Noel Raitt (born 1943), Australian athlete in Australian-rules football (played for Essendon during the 1960s)

== See also ==
- Bonnie Raitt (album), the self-titled debut album by Bonnie Raitt, released in 1971
- Raitt, Kangra, Development Block of District Kangra in Himachal Pradesh India
- Raitt's sand eel, Ammodytes marinus, is a fish in the family Ammodytidae
