= Waterville, Kansas =

City in Marshall County, Kansas

- City
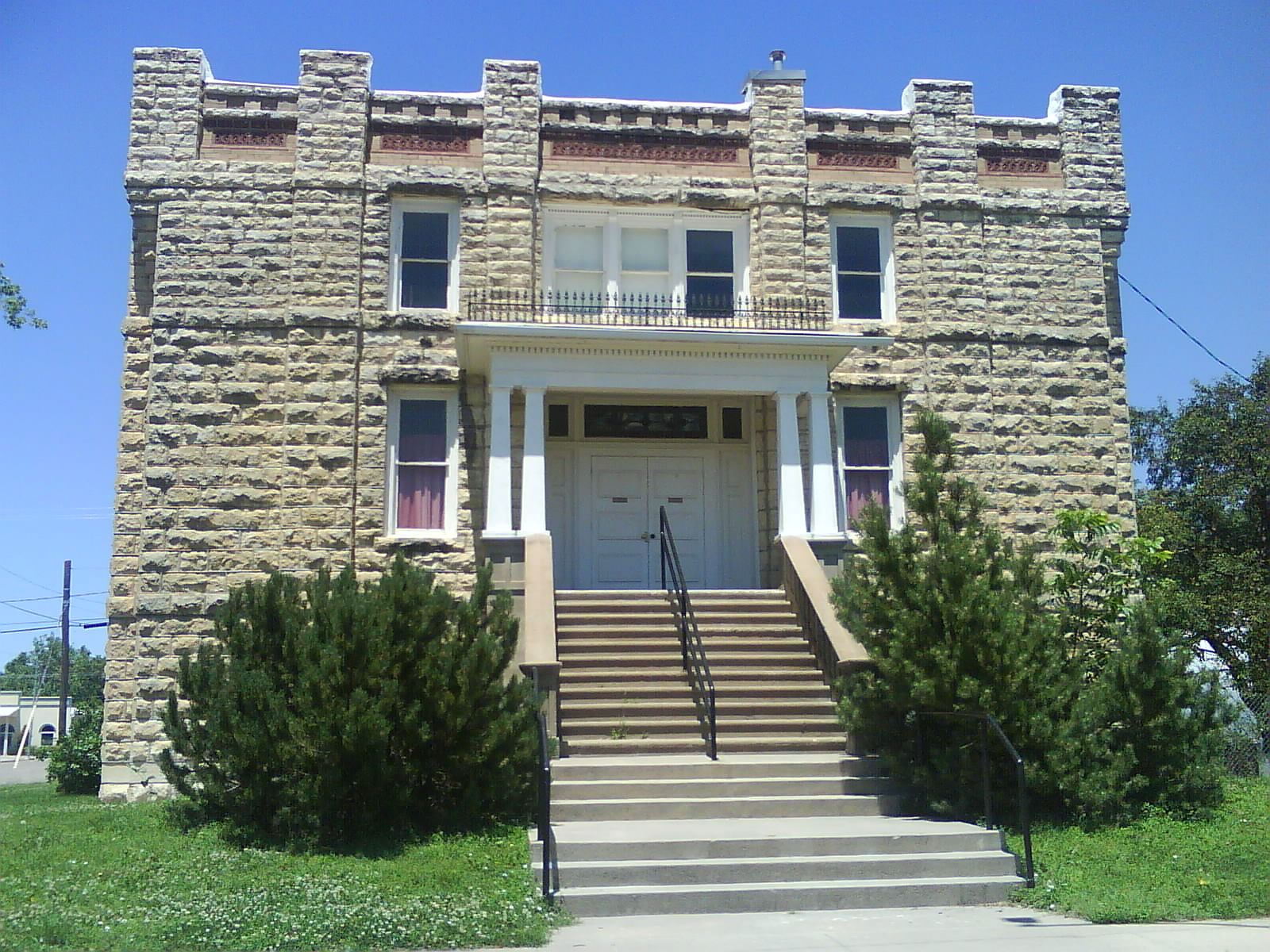
- Waterville Opera House, built in 1904

- Location within Marshall County and Kansas

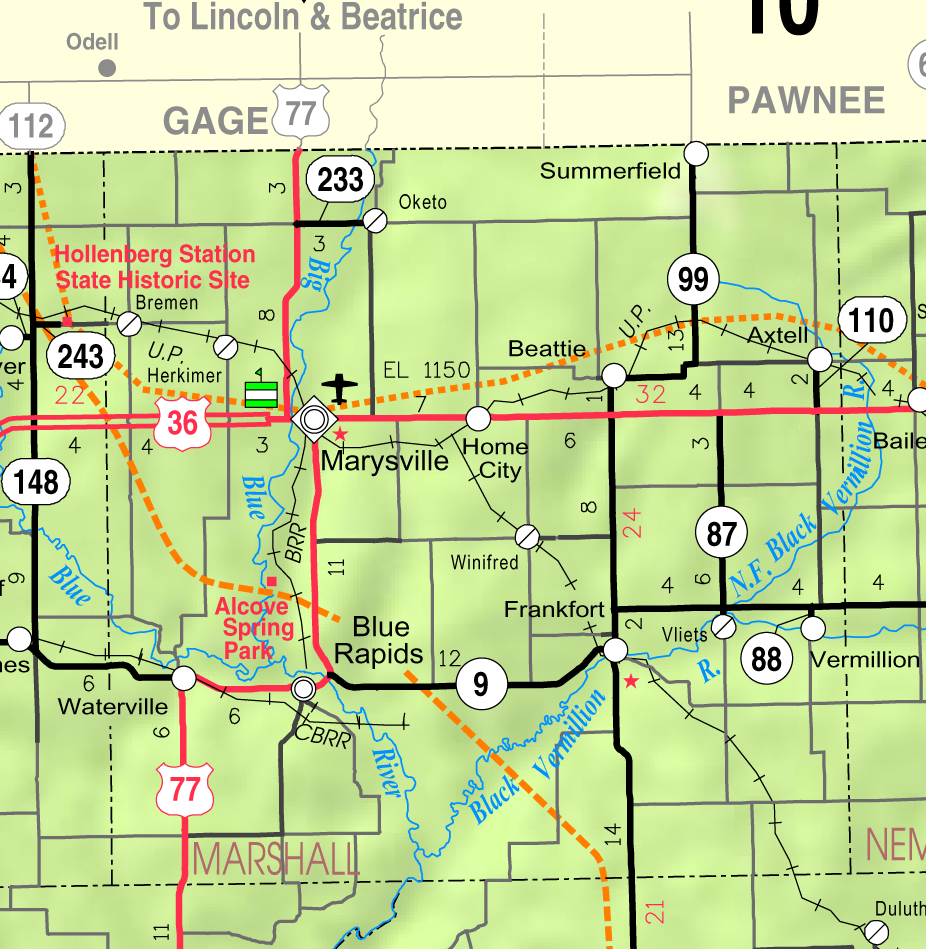
- KDOT map of Marshall County (legend)
- Coordinates: 39°41′31″N 96°44′54″W
- Country: United States
- State: Kansas
- County: Marshall
- Founded: 1868
- Incorporated: 1870
- Named for: Waterville, Maine

Area
  - Total: 0.51 sq mi (1.31 km^{2})
  - Land: 0.49 sq mi (1.27 km^{2})
  - Water: 0.015 sq mi (0.04 km^{2})
- Elevation: 1,175 ft (358 m)

Population (2020)
  - Total: 658
  - Density: 1,340/sq mi (518/km^{2})
- Time zone: UTC-6 (CST)
  - Summer (DST): UTC-5 (CDT)
- ZIP Code: 66548
- Area code: 785
- FIPS code: 20-75950
- GNIS ID: 2397214
- Website: cityofwatervilleks.org

Waterville is a city in Marshall County, Kansas, United States. As of the 2020 census, the population of the city was 658.

== History ==
Waterville was founded in 1868 by the railroad company. It was named after Waterville, Maine, the hometown of a railroad official.

The first post office in Waterville was established in February 1868. Waterville was incorporated as a village in 1870 and as a city the following year.

== Geography ==
According to the United States Census Bureau, the city has a total area of 0.50 square miles (1.29 km^{2}), of which 0.49 square miles (1.27 km^{2}) is land and 0.01 square miles (0.03 km^{2}) is water.

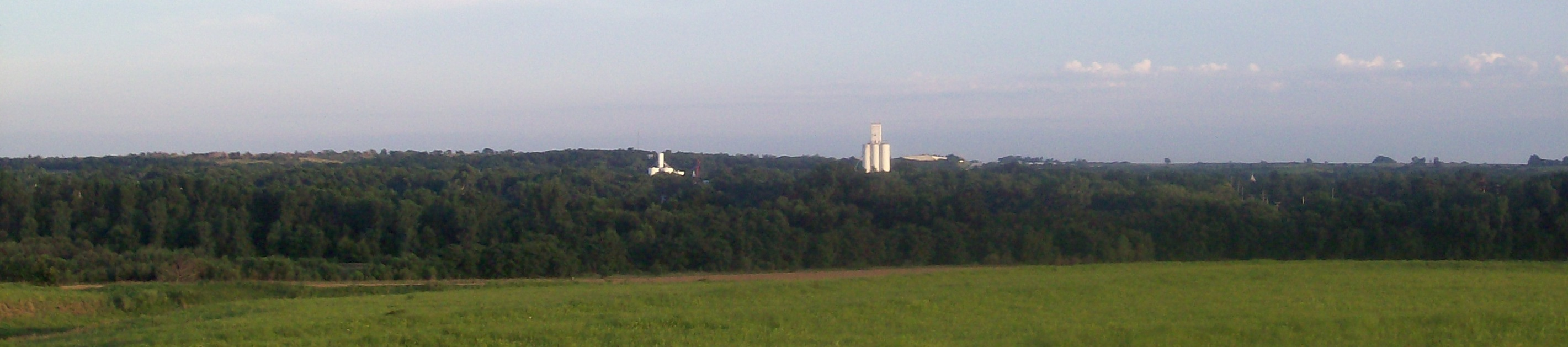
Waterville lies in the Blue River Valley, with the Little Blue River running just north of its city limits.

== Demographics ==
Historical population
Census	Pop.	Note	%±
1880	615		—
1890	577		−6.2%
1900	610		5.7%
1910	704		15.4%
1920	665		−5.5%
1930	598		−10.1%
1940	717		19.9%
1950	676		−5.7%
1960	700		3.6%
1970	632		−9.7%
1980	694		9.8%
1990	601		−13.4%
2000	681		13.3%
2010	680		−0.1%
2020	658		−3.2%
U.S. Decennial Census

=== 2010 census ===
As of the census of 2010, there were 680 people, 294 households, and 192 families residing in the city. The population density was 1,387.8 inhabitants per square mile (535.8/km^{2}). There were 331 housing units at an average density of 675.5 per square mile (260.8/km^{2}). The racial makeup of the city was 98.4% White, 0.3% African American, 0.1% Native American, 0.1% from other races, and 1.0% from two or more races. Hispanic or Latino of any race were 2.2% of the population.

There were 294 households, of which 29.3% had children under the age of 18 living with them, 51.7% were married couples living together, 9.2% had a female householder with no husband present, 4.4% had a male householder with no wife present, and 34.7% were non-families. 30.3% of all households were made up of individuals, and 19.4% had someone living alone who was 65 years of age or older. The average household size was 2.31 and the average family size was 2.90.

The median age in the city was 41 years. 26.2% of residents were under the age of 18; 5.3% were between the ages of 18 and 24; 22.5% were from 25 to 44; 23.6% were from 45 to 64; and 22.5% were 65 years of age or older. The gender makeup of the city was 47.1% male and 52.9% female.

=== 2000 census ===
As of the census of 2000, there were 681 people, 292 households, and 190 families residing in the city. The population density was 1,351.1 inhabitants per square mile (521.7/km^{2}). There were 328 housing units at an average density of 650.7 per square mile (251.2/km^{2}). The racial makeup of the city was 97.50% White, 0.29% Asian, 0.15% from other races, and 2.06% from two or more races. Hispanic or Latino of any race were 1.17% of the population.

There were 292 households, out of which 28.8% had children under the age of 18 living with them, 54.5% were married couples living together, 8.2% had a female householder with no husband present, and 34.6% were non-families. 32.2% of all households were made up of individuals, and 21.9% had someone living alone who was 65 years of age or older. The average household size was 2.33 and the average family size was 2.94.

In the city, the population was spread out, with 26.7% under the age of 18, 5.4% from 18 to 24, 22.9% from 25 to 44, 20.4% from 45 to 64, and 24.5% who were 65 years of age or older. The median age was 40 years. For every 100 females, there were 89.7 males. For every 100 females age 18 and over, there were 82.8 males.

The median income for a household in the city was $31,136, and the median income for a family was $38,472. Males had a median income of $29,107 versus $18,000 for females. The per capita income for the city was $18,833. About 8.0% of families and 10.7% of the population were below the poverty line, including 13.6% of those under age 18 and 9.6% of those age 65 or over.

== Education ==
The community is served by Valley Heights USD 498 public school district. Valley Heights Jr/Sr High School is located halfway between the towns of Blue Rapids and Waterville. The Valley Heights mascot is Mustangs.

Waterville High School was closed through school unification. The Waterville High School mascot was Waterville Yellow Jackets.

== Notable people ==
- Josephine Thorndike Berry (1871–1945), American educator, home economist
- Glen H. Thomas (1889–1962), Wichita architect

== See also ==
- Central Branch Union Pacific Railroad
