= Blue Rapids, Kansas =

City in Marshall County, Kansas

- City
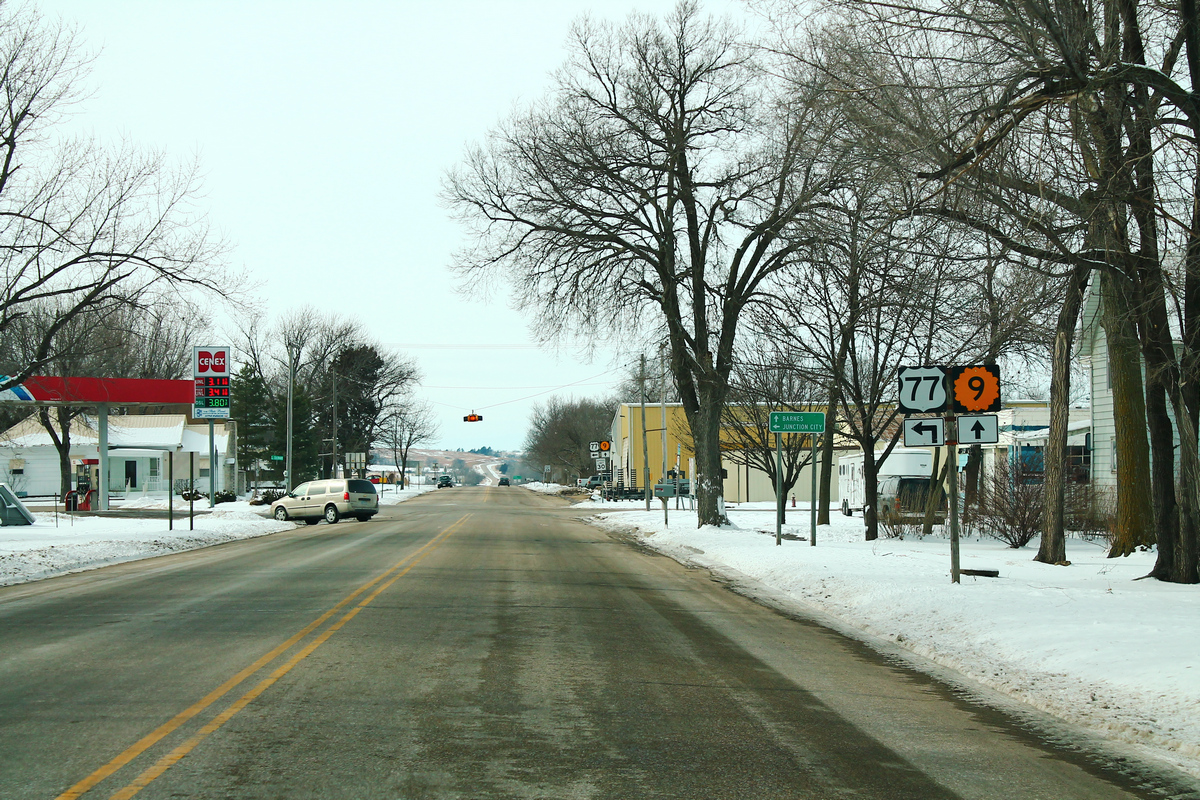
- (February 2014)

- Location within Marshall County and Kansas

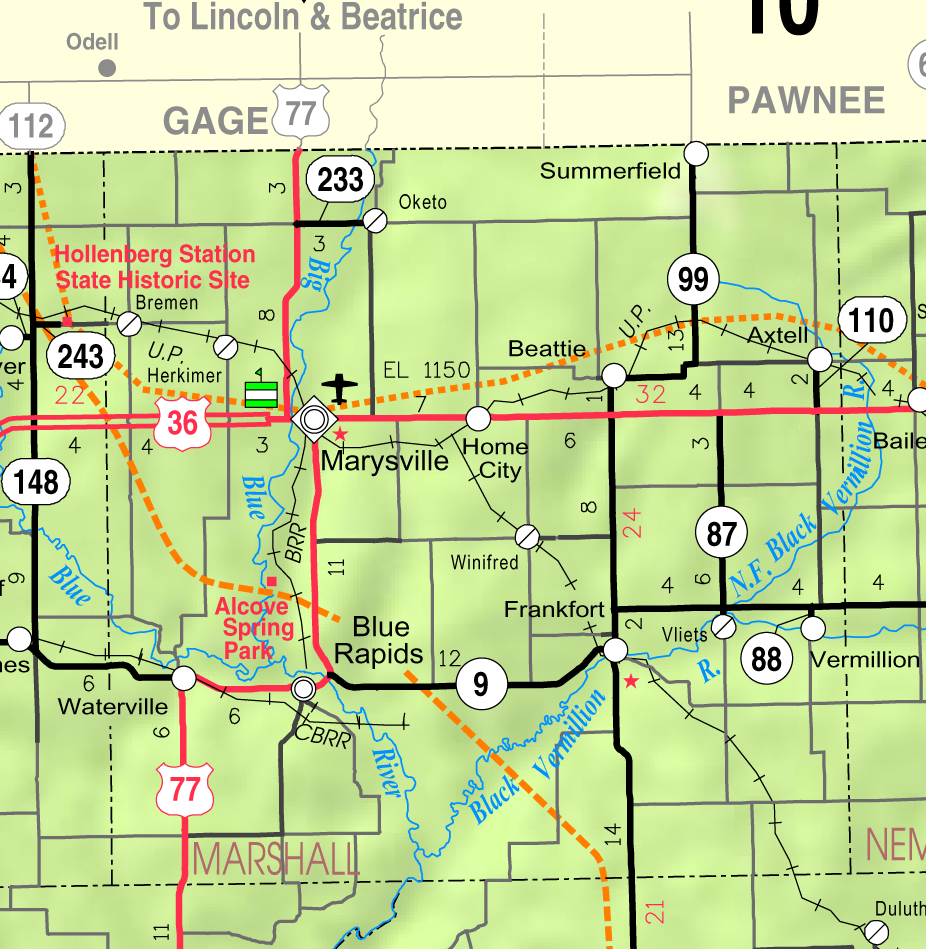
- KDOT map of Marshall County (legend)
- Coordinates: 39°40′45″N 96°39′33″W
- Country: United States
- State: Kansas
- County: Marshall
- Founded: 1869
- Incorporated: March 20, 1872

Area
  - Total: 2.00 sq mi (5.19 km^{2})
  - Land: 1.98 sq mi (5.14 km^{2})
  - Water: 0.019 sq mi (0.05 km^{2})
- Elevation: 1,158 ft (353 m)

Population (2020)
  - Total: 928
  - Density: 468/sq mi (181/km^{2})
- Time zone: UTC-6 (CST)
  - Summer (DST): UTC-5 (CDT)
- ZIP Code: 66411
- Area code: 785
- FIPS code: 20-07650
- GNIS ID: 2394205
- Website: bluerapids.org

Blue Rapids is a city in Marshall County, Kansas, United States. As of the 2020 census, the population of the city was 928.

== History ==
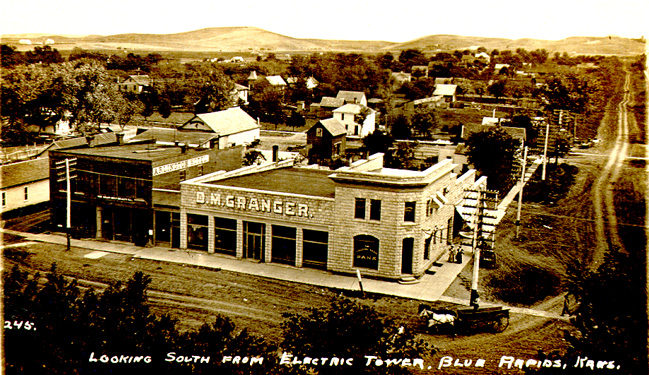
Looking south from the public square c. 1900. The Arlington House and Granger Store are in the foreground. Capital Bluff, the highest point in this part of the county, can be seen in the background.

The first endeavor to establish a town below the junction of the rivers, in 1857, failed due to misfortunes of two of the three participants. No further attempt to utilize the impressive water power was made until 1869–1870, when a colony of about 50 families from Genesee County, New York moved in, purchased land and water power rights, and began establishing a community. The Blue Rapids Town Company was formed, and by the end of 1870 the population was about 250. In 1872, Blue Rapids was incorporated as a city of third class under the statutes of Kansas.

Among the first projects in 1870 were a stone dam and a wrought iron bridge built on the Big Blue River. A hydroelectric power plant was then added to provide power for manufacturing and for the town. The power plant was destroyed by a flood in 1903. In the late 19th century and early 20th century there were four gypsum mines in the area. The population peaked around 1910 at over 1,750. The public library, built in 1875, is the oldest library west of the Mississippi in continuous operation in the same building.

Blue Rapids was the birthplace of the pancreatic cancer drug Streptozotocin. The bacterium from which the drug is derived was discovered in the late 1950s in a soil sample taken from "an uncultivated sandy soil in a grassland region" at Blue Rapids.

Blue Rapids claims to be the smallest town in the U.S. to have hosted a national league baseball game. On October 24, 1913, more than 3,000 fans watched the Chicago White Sox and New York Giants play a world tour exhibition game on the local ball field at Riverside Park that is still in use today. Blue Rapids was also home to minor league baseball. The 1910 Blue Rapids team played as members of the Class D level Eastern Kansas League.

In 2001, Blue Rapids became the site of a new NOAA Weather Radio transmitter, KZZ67, to provide weather and emergency information from the National Weather Service in Topeka, Kansas to residents of north-central and northeast Kansas.

In May 2012, "The Monument to the Ice Age" was dedicated in the town square. It features descriptions of Ice Age times, continental glaciers, and Sioux Quartzite glacial erratics -the oldest rocks in Kansas. The main reason for this Ice Age Monument is that Blue Rapids was founded in a place with abundant natural resources brought or created by the glaciers of the Ice Age over 10,000 years ago. The namesake rapids on the Blue River that were harnessed to power early industries, the sand and gravel deposits used for construction and roads, and the rich soils for agriculture are all here because of the Ice Age glaciers. The Monument honors this ancient geological heritage. Glacial erratic that was deposited in the glaciated region of Kansas during the Pleistocene era.

== Geography ==
Blue Rapids is located in northeastern Kansas near the junction of the Little Blue and Big Blue rivers. Located on highway US-77/K-9, Blue Rapids is 5 miles (8.0 km) east of its sister town Waterville, 12 miles (19 km) south of the county seat Marysville, 13 miles (21 km) west of Frankfort, and 46 miles (74 km) north of the large university town of Manhattan. According to the United States Census Bureau, the city has a total area of 2.01 square miles (5.21 km^{2}), of which 1.99 square miles (5.15 km^{2}) is land and 0.02 square miles (0.05 km^{2}) is water.

Georgia-Pacific has a gypsum mine near Blue Rapids.

== Demographics ==
Historical population
Census	Pop.	Note	%±
1870	250		—
1880	829		231.6%
1890	936		12.9%
1900	1,100		17.5%
1910	1,756		59.6%
1920	1,534		−12.6%
1930	1,465		−4.5%
1940	1,433		−2.2%
1950	1,430		−0.2%
1960	1,426		−0.3%
1970	1,148		−19.5%
1980	1,280		11.5%
1990	1,131		−11.6%
2000	1,088		−3.8%
2010	1,019		−6.3%
2020	928		−8.9%
U.S. Decennial Census

=== 2020 census ===
The 2020 United States census counted 928 people, 376 households, and 243 families in Blue Rapids. The population density was 467.5 per square mile (180.5/km^{2}). There were 418 housing units at an average density of 210.6 per square mile (81.3/km^{2}). The racial makeup was 95.37% (885) white or European American (94.94% non-Hispanic white), 0.0% (0) black or African-American, 0.22% (2) Native American or Alaska Native, 0.0% (0) Asian, 0.0% (0) Pacific Islander or Native Hawaiian, 1.08% (10) from other races, and 3.34% (31) from two or more races. Hispanic or Latino of any race was 1.62% (15) of the population.

Of the 376 households, 28.2% had children under the age of 18; 54.3% were married couples living together; 23.7% had a female householder with no spouse or partner present. 31.6% of households consisted of individuals and 17.3% had someone living alone who was 65 years of age or older. The average household size was 2.5 and the average family size was 3.4. The percent of those with a bachelor's degree or higher was estimated to be 6.9% of the population.

23.4% of the population was under the age of 18, 6.7% from 18 to 24, 21.4% from 25 to 44, 23.8% from 45 to 64, and 24.7% who were 65 years of age or older. The median age was 43.6 years. For every 100 females, there were 106.2 males. For every 100 females ages 18 and older, there were 107.3 males.

The 2016–2020 5-year American Community Survey estimates show that the median household income was $45,278 (with a margin of error of +/- $12,893) and the median family income was $70,813 (+/- $7,268). Males had a median income of $37,868 (+/- $7,567) versus $16,625 (+/- $4,855) for females. The median income for those above 16 years old was $30,233 (+/- $7,561). Approximately, 5.9% of families and 8.4% of the population were below the poverty line, including 8.2% of those under the age of 18 and 5.2% of those ages 65 or over.

=== 2010 census ===
As of the census of 2010, there were 1,019 people, 415 households, and 263 families residing in the city. The population density was 512.1 inhabitants per square mile (197.7/km^{2}). There were 465 housing units at an average density of 233.7 per square mile (90.2/km^{2}). The racial makeup of the city was 97.2% White, 0.3% African American, 1.1% Native American, 0.6% from other races, and 0.9% from two or more races. Hispanic or Latino of any race were 1.4% of the population.

There were 415 households, of which 29.9% had children under the age of 18 living with them, 51.3% were married couples living together, 7.0% had a female householder with no husband present, 5.1% had a male householder with no wife present, and 36.6% were non-families. 32.0% of all households were made up of individuals, and 15.9% had someone living alone who was 65 years of age or older. The average household size was 2.37 and the average family size was 3.00.

The median age in the city was 43.2 years. 24.2% of residents were under the age of 18; 4.9% were between the ages of 18 and 24; 22.2% were from 25 to 44; 26.8% were from 45 to 64; and 22% were 65 years of age or older. The gender makeup of the city was 47.6% male and 52.4% female.

=== 2000 census ===
As of the census of 2000, there were 1,088 people, 439 households, and 295 families residing in the city. The population density was 529 inhabitants per square mile (204/km^{2}). There were 494 housing units at an average density of 240/sq mi (93/km^{2}). The racial makeup of the city was 98.07% White, 0.18% African American, 0.09% Native American, 0.09% Asian, 0.37% from other races, and 1.19% from two or more races. Hispanic or Latino of any race were 0.55% of the population.

There were 439 households, out of which 30.5% had children under the age of 18 living with them, 56.3% were married couples living together, 6.8% had a female householder with no husband present, and 32.8% were non-families. 30.1% of all households were made up of individuals, and 16.2% had someone living alone who was 65 years of age or older. The average household size was 2.39 and the average family size was 2.97.

In the city, the age distribution of the population shows 25.1% under the age of 18, 7.3% from 18 to 24, 23.1% from 25 to 44, 22.3% from 45 to 64, and 22.2% who were 65 years of age or older. The median age was 41 years. For every 100 females, there were 94.3 males. For every 100 females age 18 and over, there were 93.6 males.

The median income for a household in the city was $30,682, and the median income for a family was $37,273. Males had a median income of $30,066 versus $18,214 for females. The per capita income for the city was $16,859. About 9.3% of families and 13.0% of the population were below the poverty line, including 17.2% of those under age 18 and 4.4% of those age 65 or over.

== Education ==
The community is served by Valley Heights USD 498 public school district. Valley Heights Jr/Sr High School is located halfway between the towns of Blue Rapids and Waterville. The Valley Heights mascot is Mustangs.

Blue Rapids High School was closed through school unification. The Blue Rapids Pirates won the Kansas State High School boys class B Track & Field championship in 1942.

== See also ==
- Central Branch Union Pacific Railroad
