= Florence Fallgatter =

American educator and home economist (1891–1973)

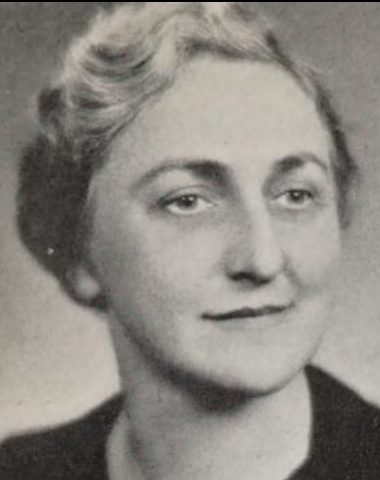
- Florence Fallgatter, from a 1936 publication of the US Department of the Interior
- Born: Florence Alberta Fallgatter; 1891; Rock Valley, Iowa
- Died: April 8, 1973; Ames, Iowa
- Occupation(s): Educator, home economist
- Known for: President, American Vocational Association (1946-1947); president, American Home Economics Association (1950-1952)

Florence Alberta Fallgatter (1891 – April 8, 1973) was an American educator and home economist. She was head of the home economics department at Iowa State University from 1938 to 1958, the first woman president of the American Vocational Association, and president of the American Home Economics Association (AHEA) from 1950 to 1952.

== Early life and education ==
Fallgatter was born in Rock Valley, Iowa, and lived in Parker, South Dakota as a girl. She earned a bachelor's degree from the University of Minnesota and a master's degree from Teachers College, Columbia University. She was awarded an honorary doctorate by Iowa State University.

== Career ==
Fallgatter taught school in Iowa and Minnesota as a young woman. In 1926 she was state president of the Montana Home Economics Association. From 1935 to 1938, she was chief of the Home Economics Education Service, a program of the United States Office of Education; she succeeded Adelaide Steele Baylor as chief, and was in turn succeeded by Edna P. Amidon. She was a home economics instructor at the University of Minnesota in 1923. She was a professor and, from 1938 to 1958, head of the home economics department at Iowa State University, the largest such department in the United States.

Fallgatter was national president of Phi Upsilon Omicron from 1934 to 1938. In 1945 she testified before a Senate hearing on women's postwar employment. She was the first woman president of the American Vocational Association, an office she held from 1946 to 1947. As AVA president, she preferred state control over federal control of vocational education programs. In 1949 she attended the International Federation of Home Economics congress in Sweden. In 1951 she served on the planning committee for the White House Conference for Children and Youth. She was president of the American Home Economics Association (AHEA) from 1950 to 1952. She chaired the advisory board of the Journal of Home Economics.

== Publications ==
- The Teaching of Art Related to the Home: Suggestions for content and method in related art instruction in the vocational program in home economics (1931, with Elsie Wilson Gwynne)
- The home project in homemaking education (1933, with Jane Hinckley Blake)
- "Consumer Education Aids" (1934)
- "The Modern Homemaking Department" (1936)
- Space and Equipment for Homemaking Instruction: A Guide to Location and Arrangement of Homemaking Departments (1936, with Edna P. Amidon)
- "Trends in Home Economics Education" (1951)
- "Our Responsibility for Freedom as Home Economists of Today" (presidential address, 1951)
- A guide for planning homemaking departments in Iowa (1955, with Louise Keller and Gladys Grabe)

== Personal life ==
Fallgatter died in 1973, in Ames, Iowa. Her grave is in the Iowa State University Cemetery.
