= Valley Heights Jr/Sr High School =

Coordinates: 39°41′11″N 96°42′42″W

Location
- 2274 6th Road; Blue Rapids, Kansas 66411; United States

Information
- Type: Public Co-Ed
- Established: 1971
- School district: Valley Heights USD 498
- Principal: Mike Savage
- Teaching staff: 16.00 (FTE)
- Grades: 7–12
- Enrollment: 178 (2023-2024)
- Student to teacher ratio: 11.12
- Campus: Rural
- Colors: Purple and white
- Mascot: Mustangs
- Nickname: Blaze
- Website: Valley Heights Jr./Sr. High School

Valley Heights Jr/Sr High School is a public secondary school located between the cities of Blue Rapids and Waterville in Kansas. It is operated by Valley Heights USD 498 school district, and serves students of grades 7 to 12.

== History ==
Valley Heights Jr/Sr High School was built shortly after the formation of Valley Heights USD 498 public school district in 1966, which serves the communities of Blue Rapids and Waterville, Kansas. In conjunction with VHHS, the Valley Heights Public School District operates an elementary school in each town, and a preschool in Waterville.

== Athletics ==
VHHS participates in KSHSAA sanctioned events under the classification of 1A. Athletic activities at Valley Heights includes football, basketball, volleyball, cross country, baseball, softball, track and field, and golf.

== See also ==
- List of high schools in Kansas
- List of unified school districts in Kansas
