= Agnes Ellen Harris =

American educator (1883–1952)

- Born: July 17, 1883; Cedartown, Georgia
- Died: December 18, 1952 (aged 69); Tuscaloosa, Alabama
- Occupation: Educator
- Years active: 1903–1952
- Known for: developing Florida 4-H girls program

Agnes Ellen Harris (July 17, 1883 – December 18, 1952) was an American educator. She worked in education in Georgia, Florida, Texas, Washington, D.C., and Alabama, establishing Home Economics programs throughout the area. She was instrumental in founding "Tomato Clubs" in Florida, which were the precursor to the 4-H Youth Programs. She was one of the earliest practitioners of the field of Domestic Science and taught nutrition and health to women for fifty years. She was a charter member of the American Home Economics Association and served as a national officer in the 1920s. She was inducted into the Alabama Women's Hall of Fame in 1972.

== Biography ==
Agnes Ellen Harris was born on July 17, 1883, to James Coffee and Ellen (née Simmons) Harris in Cedartown, Georgia. She was a graduate of Georgia Women's College and after completing her teachers certification, attended Oread Institute in Worcester, Massachusetts. Oread was one of the few educational facilities at that time which were teaching the new science of Domestic Cooking. From 1903 to 1908, Harris taught home economics in Georgia and during her summers, she took further classes at Columbia University. In 1908, she became one of the charter members of the American Home Economics Association, for which she would serve as national vice-president between 1926 and 1929.

As head of the Department of Home Economics at Florida State College for Women, Harris started a program in 1908 teaching canning fruits and vegetables to promote better nutrition. Through home demonstration programs, she taught rural women that canning would allow them to better utilize their farm harvests as well as sell their excess production for profit. In 1912, she became the first home demonstration agent for the state of Florida and began by starting "Tomato Clubs" for girls in 11 counties in Florida. The idea was to provide seeds for a crop that was easy to grow and teach young people how to plant, grow and sell for profit any tomatoes they could not eat. Later, the "Tomato Clubs", and similar "Corn Clubs" which had been started for boys, became the 4-H Youth Organization of Florida. Harris had continued her studies during the summers at Columbia University and graduated with her Bachelor of Science degree in 1910.

In 1919, Harris left Florida to become the director of the Home Economics program in Texas. After a year, she moved to Washington, D.C., and worked as a field agent for the U.S. Department of Agriculture. While she was in Washington, Harris returned to school and completed her Master of Arts from Columbia in 1922. After seven years in Washington, Harris accepted a position as Dean of Women at the University of Alabama in Tuscaloosa. She organized the home-ec school and became a dual Dean of Women and the Home Economics Department in 1929. In 1941, Harris was awarded an honorary doctorate from the University of Alabama. In 1945, she became solely responsible for the Home-Ec Department.

Harris died on December 18, 1952, in Tuscaloosa, Alabama, en route to a dinner at the University Club.

== Legacy ==
A scholarship in her name was established by donations from former students, parents and teachers and is awarded annually to full-time human environmental sciences graduate students on a merit basis. In 1972, she was posthumously inducted into the Alabama Women's Hall of Fame.

== Published works ==
- Harris, Agnes Ellen; Blanton, Annie Webb; Peek, Lillian (1920). Texas high schools: home economics. Austin, Texas: Department of Education.
