= Rait (name) =

Rait is a given name and surname. Notable people with the name include:

== Given name ==
- Rait Ärm (born 2000), Estonian road cyclist
- Rait Käbin (born 1981), Estonian basketball coach and former player
- Rait Keerles (born 1980), Estonian basketball player
- Rait Maruste (born 1953), Estonian judge, legal scholar and politician
- Rait-Riivo Laane (born 1993), Estonian, basketball player
- Rait Rikberg (born 1982), Estonian volleyball player

== Middle name ==
- Rowan Rait Kerr (1891–1961), Irish-born cricketer and administrator

== Surname ==
- Alan Rait (1908–1965), Australian rules football player
- James Rait (1689–1777), Scottish clergyman
- John de Rait, 14th-century Scottish cleric
- Mohamed Billal Rait (born 1986), Algerian football player
- Rita Rait-Kovaleva (1898–1989), Soviet literary translator and writer
- Robert Rait (1874–1936), Scottish historian

== See also ==
- Raitt
