= Josephine Thorndike Berry =

American educator and home economist

Josephine Thorndike Berry (February 25, 1871 – July 21, 1945) was an American educator and home economist. She held several roles as an educator including that of Superintendent of schools at Waterville, Kansas and Professor of Domestic Science, Northern Illinois State Normal School (now Northern Illinois University) at DeKalb, Illinois. She was the head of the Department of Home Economics at Northern Illinois State Normal School, at the State College of Washington, and at the University of Minnesota.

== Early life and education ==
Berry was born in Waterville, Kansas on February 25, 1871, the daughter of Edward A. and Flora A. (Lewis) Berry. She was educated at the University of Kansas, A.B.; Teachers College, Columbia University, B.S. 1904, A.M. 1910; Yale University, 1909–10; research fellow, Teachers College, Columbia University, 1909–10 (member, Pi Beta Phi).

== Career ==
Berry was the Superintendent of schools, Waterville, Kansas, 1900–02. She was the assistant in the Department of Household Administration, University of Chicago. Berry served as head of the Department of Home Economics, Northern Illinois State Normal School; head of the Department of Home Economics, State College of Washington (now Washington State University); and head, Home Economics Department, University of Minnesota, 1913–18. She was the assistant director for home economics, Federal Board for Vocational Education, 1917–18.

Berry established Thorndike Hall in Kansas City, Missouri after noticing a lack of appropriate housing for working women in that city. She favored woman suffrage, and was progressive in politics. Berry was a member of the American Home Economics Association, American Chemical Society Association of Collegiate Alumnae, National Society for Vocational Education, American Academy of Political and Social Science, Association of Collegiate Alumnae, and the American Association for the Advancement of Science.

== Death ==
Josephine Thorndike Berry died at St. Mary's Hospital, in Kansas City, Missouri, July 21, 1945.
