= Mary E. Sweeney =

American educator and author (1879–1968)

- Born: October 11, 1879; Lexington, Kentucky
- Died: June 11, 1968 (aged 88); Kentucky
- Occupations: Educator, author and clubwoman
- Parent(s): Dr. W. O. Sweeny and Margaret Prewitt Sweeny

Mary E. Sweeney (October 11, 1879 – June 11, 1968) was a home economics professional who was head of the home economics section of the United States Food Administration during World War I. Sweeney was President of American Home Economics Association.

Born in Lexington, Kentucky on October 11, 1879, to Dr. W. O. Sweeney and Margaret Prewitt Sweeney, Mary E. Sweeney attended Transylvania University, where she received her bachelor's degree in 1899. She earned a Master of Science degree from the University of Kentucky, and another master's degree in 1912 from Columbia University.

== Background to home economics career ==
When the Morrill Act passed in 1862, the "mechanic arts" became an important curricular reform movement for the U.S., offering wider access to education which until that time had focused on preparing young men for white-collar professions. The land-grant schools slowly opened their doors to women with the expectation that they would become better at managing their households. By the latter part of the nineteenth century, courses in "domestic science" became popular. Merging with the public health and social reform efforts of the Progressive Era, this movement in educational reform for girls and rural women came to be called home economics. By 1908, the American Home Economics Association was formed out of a series of annual gatherings at Lake Placid, New York. This organization lobbied federal and state governments to create home economics research and teaching opportunities, especially focusing at first on agricultural extension services. Throughout the twentieth century, home economists contributed to policy debates on social welfare, nutrition, child development, housing, consumer protection and advocacy, as well as standardization of consumer products. Their application of scientific research in various industries and academic disciplines, including family health and economics, played a major role in creating modern hygiene, nutritional and scientific medicinal practices for children.

== Home economics career ==
Sweeney taught physics and chemistry at Campbell-Hagerman College before she came to work at the University of Kentucky as a specialist in home economics extension. After serving for five years in rural Kentucky where she introduced hot school lunches in rural schools and courses in cooking and sewing in elementary and high schools, she was promoted to serve as the head of the department of Home Economics in the College of Agriculture in 1913. She was the first dean of the university's new College of Home Economics that was formed in 1916. Sweeney wrote that this step in moving the Home Economics department into a separate college was "the largest and most progressive step that has been taken in the interests of Kentucky women." She opined that a graduate from the new college would equally "rank with the man who takes his degree in law or medicine." A year later, the new College of Home Economics at the University of Kentucky was reabsorbed back into the College of Agriculture and under the leadership of a male dean.

In 1917 Sweeney was appointed to be the chair of home economics for the U.S. Food Administration in Washington D.C. where she trained citizens about rationing food during wartime. She left with her sister Sunshine Sweeney in the fall of 1917 to work as canteen workers with the U.S. Army in France with the YMCA and the Army of Occupation in Germany.

In 1920 Sweeney left to become Dean of Human Ecology at Michigan Agriculture College (now Michigan State University), and in that same year was elected president of the American Home Economics Association, which had been started in 1909 by Ellen Swallow Richards. She returned to the University of Kentucky in 1923, but in 1925 left to become the Physical Growth and Development department chair of the Merrill Palmer School (later Institute) in Detroit, Michigan. She worked with the American Red Cross and the Detroit Public Schools to improve the care and nutrition of children living in the city, focusing heavily on the education of juvenile girls who were sent to detention homes or were studying at continuing education schools. A model for child development laboratories, the research and model programs coming out of this institution eventually led to the development of national standards for the federal Head Start Program. By 1928, Sweeney became assistant director and recruited the school's only black student, Ethel Childs Baker, during an absence by the founding director, Edna Noble White. There Sweeney continued her work in research, teaching and writing about nutrition and child development until her retirement in 1946.

In 1939 she spent three months in India learning the customs and government. She received a U.S. Army citation for bravery during World War II. After the war, Sweeney served as the North American Delegate to the International Missionary Conference in Madras, India. The All-India Women's Conference and the Tata Institute of Social Sciences invited her to return to India in 1948, and the U.S. Department of State's Department of International Exchange of Persons supported her trip as a consultant in partnership with Agricultural Missions, Inc. In addition, she worked in China as a consultant on child welfare.

Sweeney also taught at Mississippi Southern College, Hattiesburg.

In 1958, the University of Kentucky Home Management House at 644 Maxwelton Court was named for Sweeney. Senior women would live in the house for six weeks to learn how to use modern appliances.

Mary E. Sweeney was named to the Hall of Distinguished Alumni at the University of Kentucky in February 1965.

== Organizations ==
Sweeney was a member of and often took leadership roles in many professional and benevolent organizations:

- American Academy of Political and Social Science
- American Association of University Women
- American Biochemical Society (honorary Vice President)
- American Chemical Society
- American Home Economics Association (President and Executive Secretary)
- Food Habits Committee for the United States National Research Council
- Kappa Kappa Gamma
- Kentucky Federation of Women's Clubs
- Society for the Advancement of Science
- Society for Research in Child Development

== Published works ==
=== Journals ===
- Sweeny, Mary E. (March 1921). "A Call to Service". Bulletin of the American Home Economics Association. 7 (1): 1–2.
- Sweeny, Mary E. (November 1922). "The President's Address: Proceedings of the Fifteenth Annual Meeting of the American Home Economics Association, Corvallis, Oregon, August 1-5, 1922". Journal of Home Economics. 14 (11): 519–22.
- Sweeny, Mary E. (October 1923). "Report of Executive Secretary". Journal of Home Economics. 15 (10): 671–78.
- Sweeny, Mary E. (June 1927). "Some Observations on the Feeding of Young Children". 19 (6): 307–12.
- Sweeny, Mary E.; et al. (September 1929). "A Method for Studying the Activity of Preschool Children". Journal of Home Economics. 21 (9): 671–78.
- Sweeny, Mary E. (June 1931). "Anna Richardson, the Woman". Journal of Home Economics. 23 (6): 518–19.

=== Books ===
- Sweeney, Mary E., head of Home Economic Department, University of Kentucky; Purnell, Linda B., assistant in foods and nutrition, University of Kentucky (1918). War cook book. Louisville KY: Mayes Print. Co.
- Sweeny, Mary E.; et al. (1929). A method of recording the posture of preschool children. Detroit, MI: Merrill-Palmer Institute.
- Rand, Winifred; Sweeny, Mary E.; Vincent, Elizabeth Lee (1930). Growth and development of the young child. Philadelphia and London: W.B. Saunders Co.
- Sweeny, Mary E.; Breckenridge, Marian E. (1936). How to feed children in nursery schools: with suggestions for planning meals wherever two-to five-year-olds eat together. Detroit, MI: Merrill-Palmer Institute.

== Death ==
Mary E. Sweeney died June 11, 1968, and is buried at the Lexington Cemetery in Lexington, Kentucky.

== See also ==
- American Association of Family and Consumer Sciences
- Michigan State College
- University of Kentucky
