= Effie Raitt =

American home economist (1878–1945)

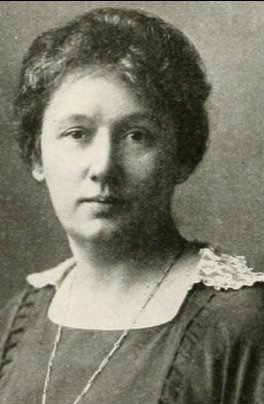
- Effie Raitt, from a 1923 publication
- Born: Effie Isobel Raitt; June 13, 1878; Patterson, Iowa
- Died: December 4, 1945 (aged 67); Seattle, Washington
- Occupations: Home economist, dietitian, college professor

Effie Isobel Raitt (June 13, 1878 – December 4, 1945) was an American dietitian and college professor. She was head of the University of Washington's School of Home Economics for more than thirty years, from 1912 to 1945. Raitt Hall on the university's central Quad is named in her honor. She was a national leader of both the American Home Economics Association and the American Dietetic Association.

== Early life and education ==
Effie Raitt was born in Patterson, Iowa, the daughter of George Patterson Raitt and Janet (or Jeanette) McFadden Raitt. All of her grandparents were born in Scotland; her father was a Presbyterian minister. She trained as a dietitian at Columbia University and Northwestern University.

== Career ==
Raitt was a professor and dean of home economics at the University of Washington from 1912 to 1945. She also taught summer courses at the University of California. She was president of the American Home Economics Association from 1934 to 1936, and vice-president of the American Dietetic Association in 1924. In 1929, she spoke at the annual meeting of the Western Hospital Association, in Los Angeles, on the education of dietitians. She was one of the experts who attended the White House Conference on Home Building and Home Ownership in 1931. She served on the board of the Seattle Visiting Nurse Service in the 1930s. She attended the 4th Pan-Pacific Women's Conference in Vancouver in 1937.

During World War I, Raitt was featured as an expert in promotional materials published by dairy industries in Canada and the Pacific Northwest. During World War II she joined other home economists in supporting a newspaper columnist's campaign of "nutrition for national defense".

== Publications ==
- "A Survey of the Status of the Hospital Dietitian" (1923)
- "The Institutional Manager" (1927)
- "Home Economics in the State of Washington" (1929)
- "The Nature and Function of Home Economics" (1935)
- "What Can Business Do to Remove Consumer Suspicion?" (1936)

== Personal life ==
Raitt lived with her sister Elsie in Seattle for much of her adult life. She died in 1945, at the age of 67. The University of Washington renamed the home economics department's building "Raitt Hall" in 1946; a fellowship award was also named in her memory.
