= American Association of Family and Consumer Sciences =

American Association of Family and Consumer Sciences (AAFCS) is an American professional association that networks professionals in the area of family and consumer science. It was founded in 1908 as the American Home Economics Association by Ellen H. Richards. In 1994 it changed its name to the current one.

The association started with about 800 members and grew to over 50,000 by the mid-1960s. In the early 20th century, the association did not often mention Black universities in its journal, and it also practiced segregation. It encouraged African American home economics leaders to form their own groups. Many already had formed such groups, which included the National Association of Teachers in Colored Schools. By the mid-1990s membership had fallen below 25,000 and by 2001, it was just over 13,000. Membership continued to decline, and by 2008 was just over 7,000, and where by early 2012, the numbers fell to approximately 5,000 members.

The association currently acts as a professional network primarily for professors and teachers of home economics and related courses, but also includes large numbers from government, business and non-profit organizations.

AAFCS is one of the five organizations that form the Consortium of Family Organizations. While not having its own political action committee, it recommends the "Vocational Political Action Committee"; and in 1985, the AAFCS joined the Home Economics Public Policy Council (HEPPC), which does engage in legislative action.

The field originated from home economics to what it is today. Family and Consumer Sciences is an interdisciplinary field that combines social sciences (emphasizing on the well-being of individuals, families, and communities) and natural sciences (emphasizing on nutrition, development, and textile science). Aspects included: nutrition, cooking, parenting and human development, interior design, textiles, economics, housing, apparel merchandising, resource management, ad other related specialties.

== Awards ==
- National Family and Consumer Sciences Teacher of the Year Award, annually for outstanding educational programs
- Borden Award, annually for research in nutrition
- Ruth O'Brien Project Grants, periodically for development of research in family and consumer science
- AAFCS fellowships awarded to graduate students in family and consumer science
- Atwater International fellowship to non-American graduate students in family and consumer science, established in 1947 and named after Helen W. Atwater

== Publications ==
- Journal of Family and Consumer Sciences, a quarterly refereed professional publication, formerly the Journal of Home Economics renamed in 1994 ISSN 1082-1651
- Family and Consumer Sciences Research Journal, a quarterly refereed technical publication, published on behalf of the association, ISSN 1077-727X (print), ISSN 1552-3934 (web), by SAGE Publications through 2009, then by Wiley-Blackwell
- AAFCS Action, a five times per year newsletter detailing association and member activities, established in 1974 discontinued as a paper publication in 2002
- Yearbook (American Association of Family and Consumer Sciences. Education and Technology Division) from 1981 to 2001 the Education and Technology Division of AAFCS published a yearbook for home economics teachers. Beginning in 2002 it was available only in CD-ROM format. This yearbook provided valuable information to prospective housewives.

== Notable members ==
- Anna Barrows, cooking lecturer, early 20th century
- Josephine Thorndike Berry (1871–1945), educator, home economist
- Minna C. Denton (1873–1958), USDA home economist
- Agnes Ellen Harris, pioneer in women's education programs, charter member
- Una B. Herrick, Dean of College of Household and Industrial Arts and later the first Dean of Women, Montana State College, from 1911 to 1932. In 1926 Montana State College built Herrick Hall to house the Home Economics Department; the building was named after Dean Herrick.

== Notable presidents ==
- Ellen Swallow Richards (1909–1910)
- Isabel Bevier (1911–1912)
- Sarah Louise Arnold (1913–1914)
- Martha Van Rensselaer (1914–1916)
- Edna Noble White (1918–1920)
- Mary E. Sweeney (1920–1922)
- Effie Raitt (1934–1936)
- Florence Fallgatter (1950–1952)
- Mercedes A. Bates (1970–1971)
