= University of Kentucky Arboretum =

State Botanical Garden in Kentucky, US

The Arboretum, State Botanical Garden of Kentucky
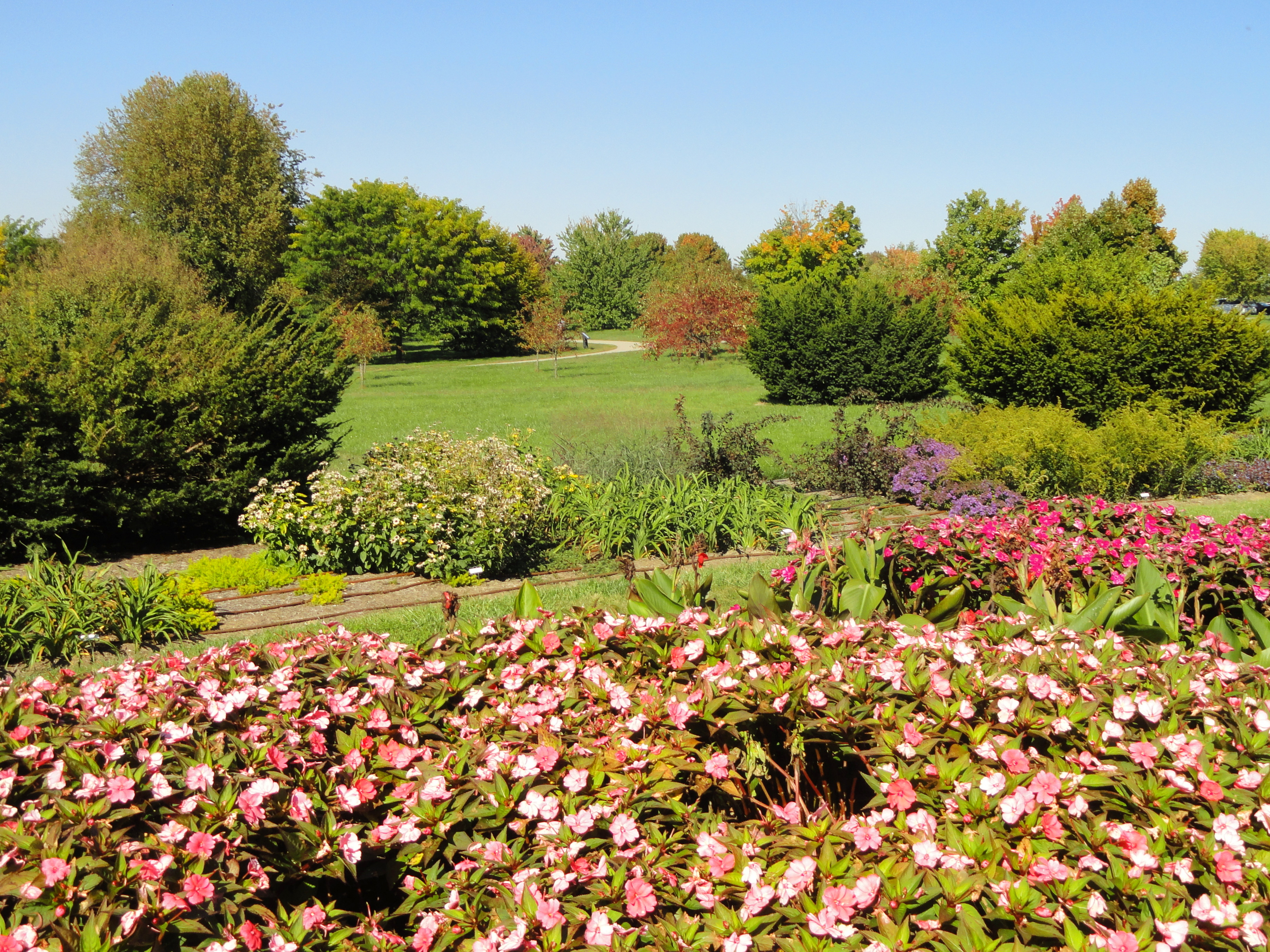
- Interactive map of The Arboretum, State Botanical Garden of Kentucky
- Type: Arboretum and Botanical Gardens
- Location: Lexington, Kentucky, United States
- Coordinates: 38°00′53″N 84°30′14″W
- Area: 100 acres (0.40 km^{2})
- Created: 1991
- Operator: University of Kentucky & Lexington, Kentucky
- Open: All year
- Website: arboretum.ca.uky.edu

The Arboretum, State Botanical Garden of Kentucky (Also known as University of Kentucky Arboretum or Lexington Arboretum), 40 hectares or 100 acres (0.40 km^{2}), is located at the University of Kentucky in Lexington, Kentucky, United States. It is open to the public from dawn to dusk every day of the year. The Arboretum hosts 18 tree species native to Kentucky, as well as 80 other native Kentucky plant species. In total, the Arboretum contains more than 1,200 native species.

It contains the Kentucky Children's Garden, a Home Demonstration Garden which includes: a Vegetable Garden, Herb Garden, Home Fruit and Nuts Garden, a rose garden, a fragrance garden, (including Black, Persian and Japanese Walnuts, Pecan, Shellbark and Shagbark Hickory, Chinese Chestnut as well as dwarf apple cultivars, an American Persimmon and native Pawpaw trees), the All-America Selection Trials Garden, Perennial Collection, Ground Cover Demonstration, Woody Plant Collection, and a "Walk Across Kentucky" that simulates Kentucky's seven regional landscapes: Bluegrass, Knobs, Appalachian Plateaus, Cumberland Mountains, Mississippian Plateaus and Outer Nashville Basin (Pennyroyal), Shawnee Hills, Mississippi Embayment and Alluvial Basin (Jackson Purchase).

The separate areas allow the Arboretum to create different learning events based on different parts of Kentucky. The Arboretum is also used widely as a learning environment, bringing in classes from local schools to come and learn with hands-on experiences, like the life cycle of a butterfly. Older nature enthusiasts can attend demonstrations in the home garden demonstration garden.

== History ==
=== Research about the Arboretum ===
Early days of the arboretum.

There has been research on the woodland of the Arboretum that began in 1940. In 1968 the Natural Resources Conservative Service of the US Department of Agriculture mapped the soil as mostly Maury silt loam. A recent mapping redefined the soil as a mixture of Maury and Bluegrass. They found the Arboretum is dominated by black walnut in the canopy and hackberry in the sub-canopy. These trees are native to the area but there are plants such as the yellow poplar that are native to the region but were planted in the Arboretum in the 1950s.

Also, in the 1950s the Forestry Department at the University of Kentucky put up a fence to exclude cattle and also be able to track undisturbed growth. The fence was a woven wire and 1.5 m high, there have been no deer in the Arboretum for almost a century. In the 1990s nonnative shrubs were eliminated, Lonicera maackii and Euonymus alatus.

=== Redevelopment ===
In 1990, land from the College of Agriculture was donated to be a joint venue between the College of Agriculture and the city of Lexington. The Arboretum was created in 1991, at which time it was overrun with non-native invasive plants such as honeysuckle and wintercreeper. The removal of such invasive plants has been and continues to be a major goal of Arboretum staff and volunteers. Every year, the Arboretum has hosted Arbor Day events, and every year there is a different theme. The Arbor Day events mark the beginning of the season, with many attractions happening all day. The peak season of the Arboretum is April 1 to October 31. If you were to take a walk through the Arboretum, chances are you'll see many different things. You could see students sitting on the grass studying, or people walking their dogs on the "Walk Across Kentucky" path. Depending on the time of year, you could even see concerts. Most people go to the Arboretum to enjoy the botanical garden and the outdoors, walk the trails, to let their children play outdoors, to take photos, and for school related trips.

In 1994, the Children's Garden was thought of, then ten years later a conceptual design was drawn, and construction began in 2007. The Children's Garden was originally thought to be "a living library," the goal being the children could play in the water, get in the water, and climb on things. The children's Garden is closed on Mondays and Tuesdays.

== Effects on Lexington ==
Since the Arboretum has been in place, the town of Lexington has undergone many environmental changes, such as less harmful runoff and less CO_{2}. Both continue to decrease as the arboretum grows. Both are also good for the city as they attempt to become a more environmentally friendly city.

== Gallery ==
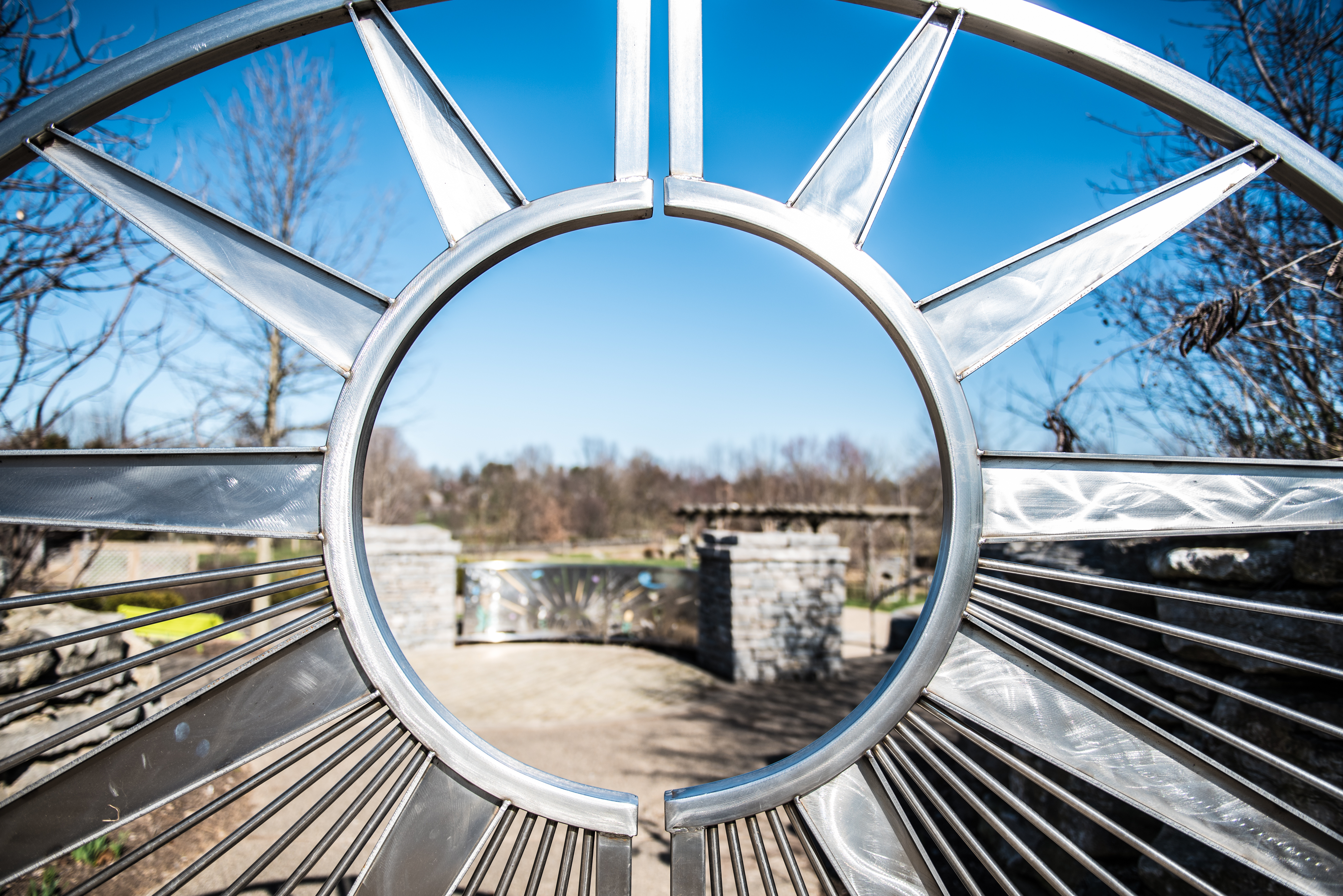

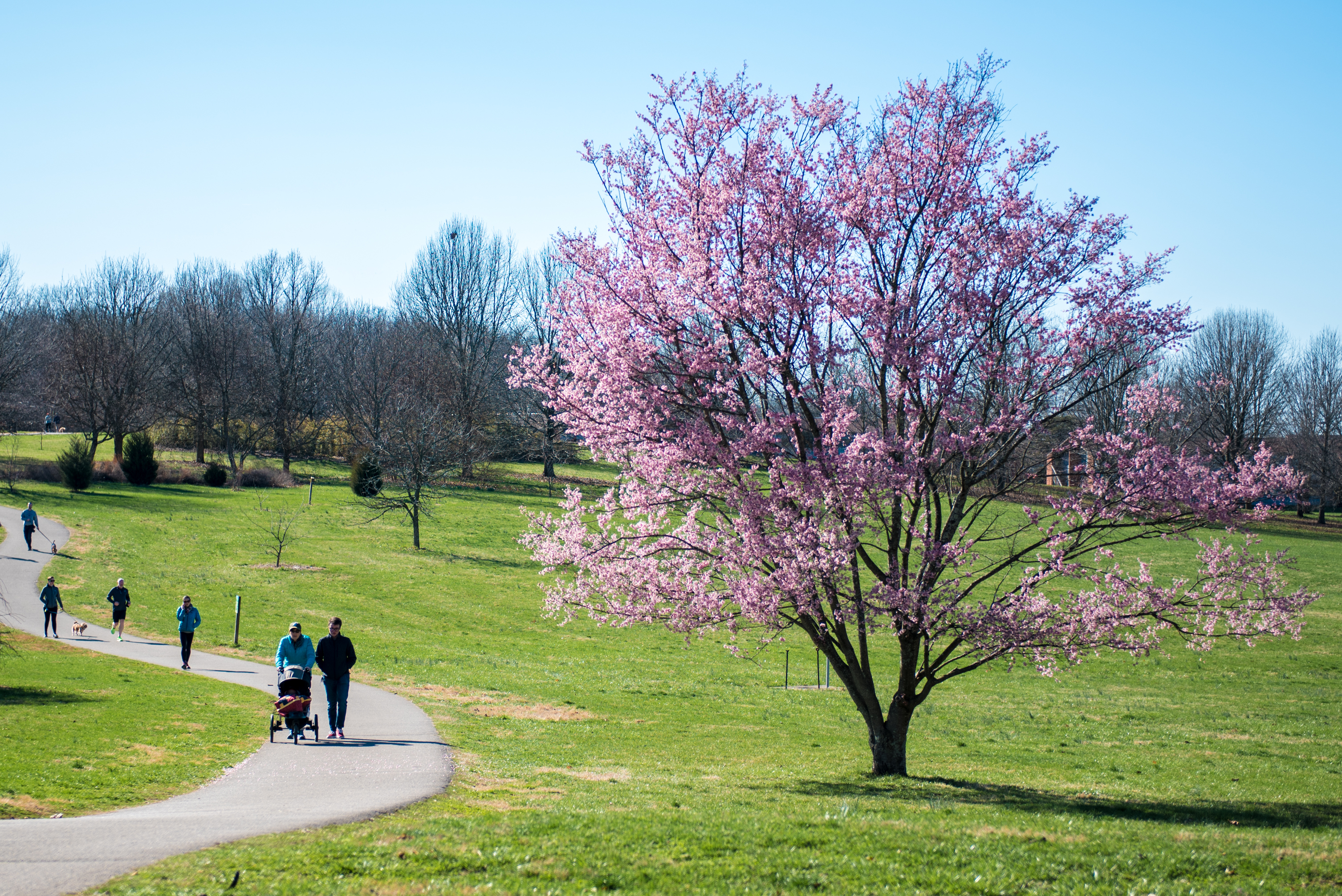

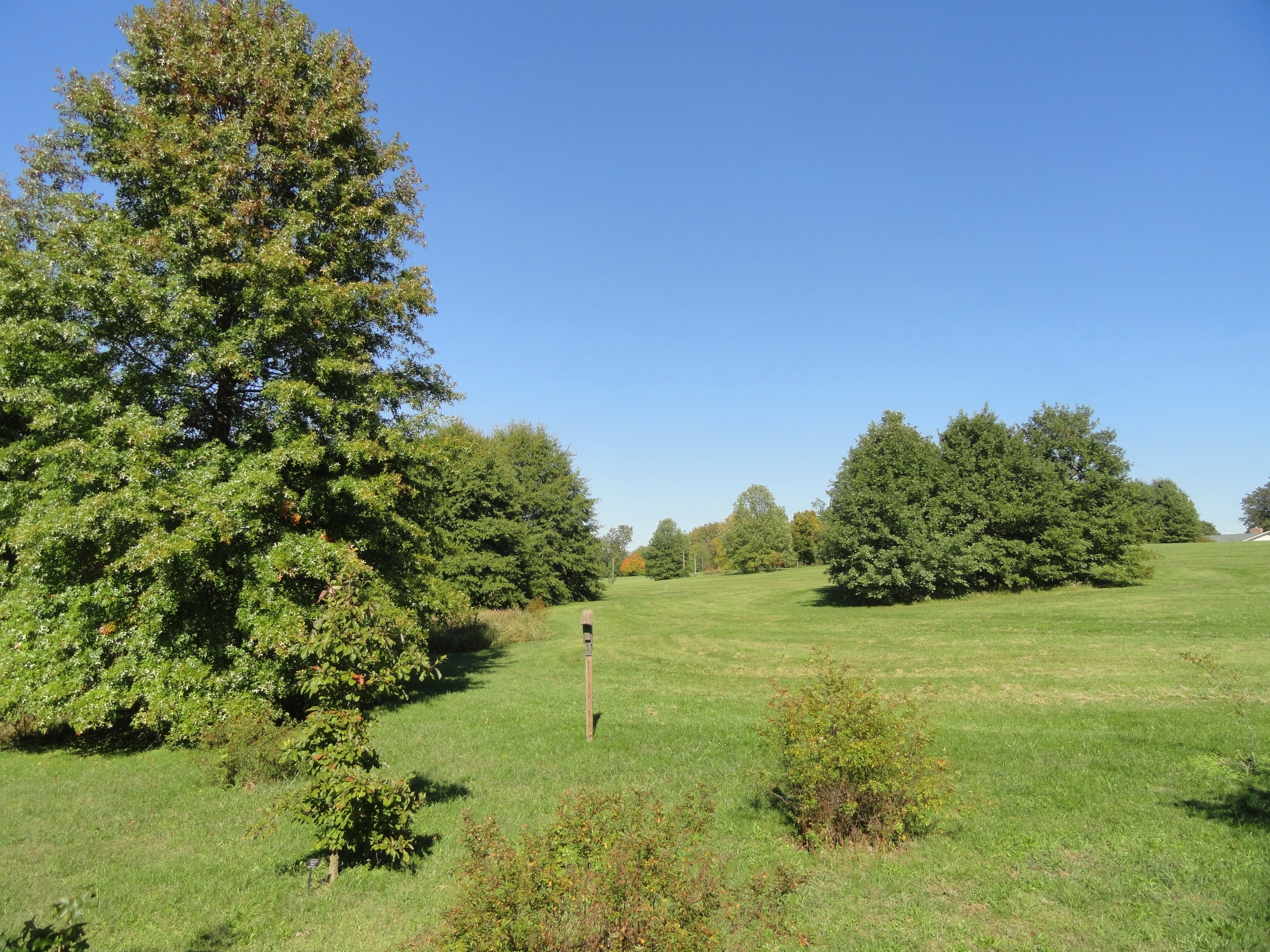

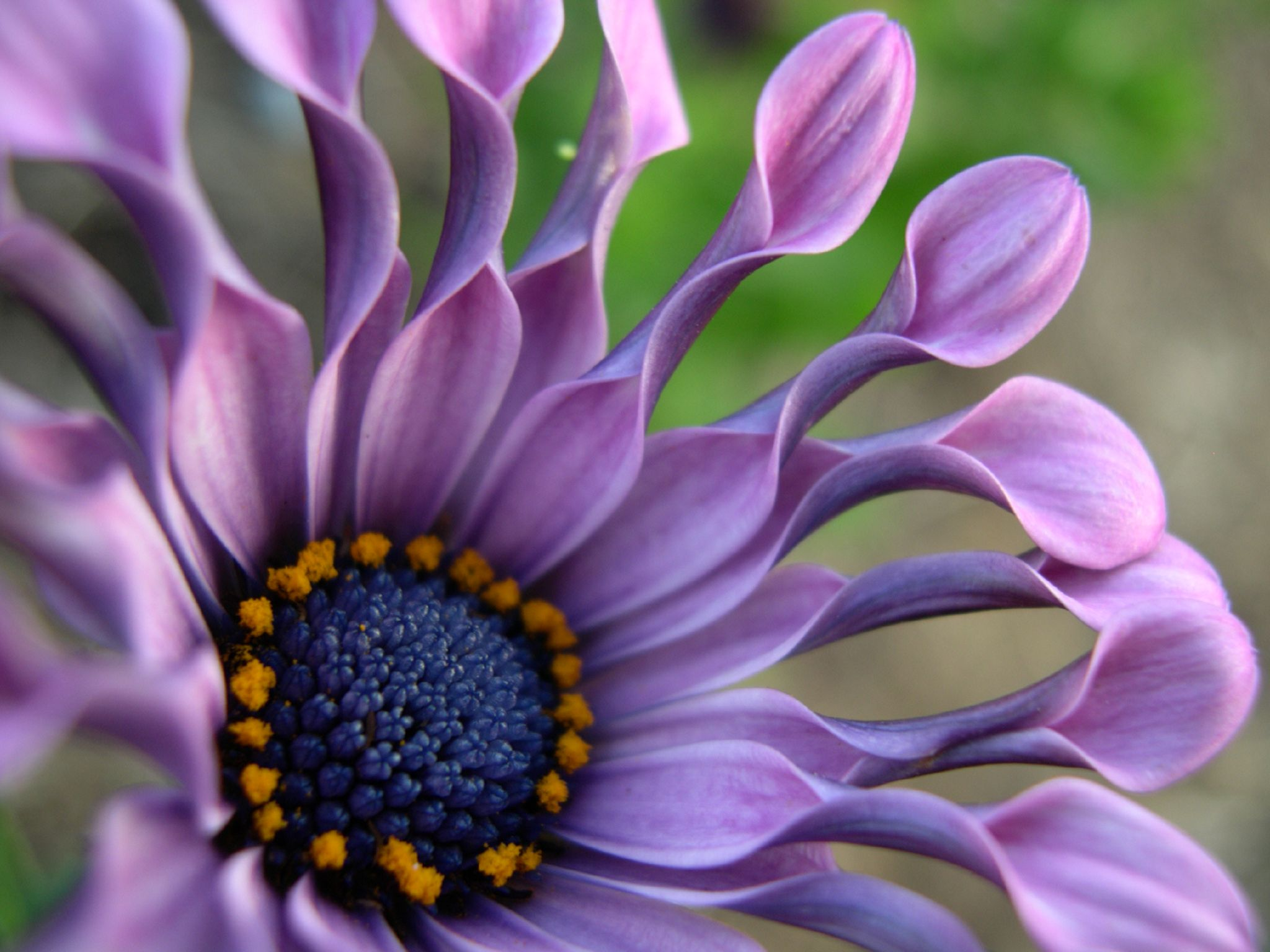

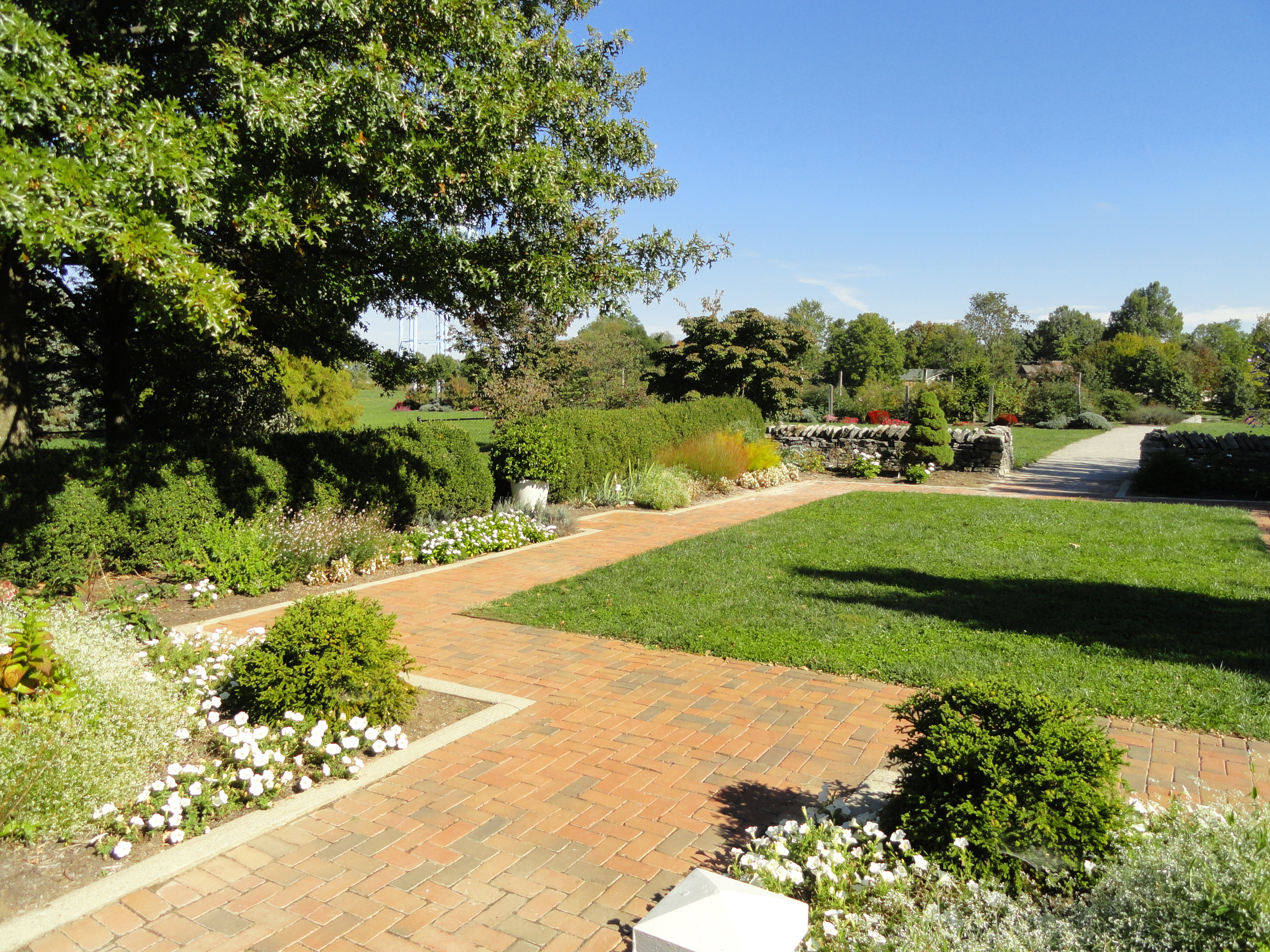

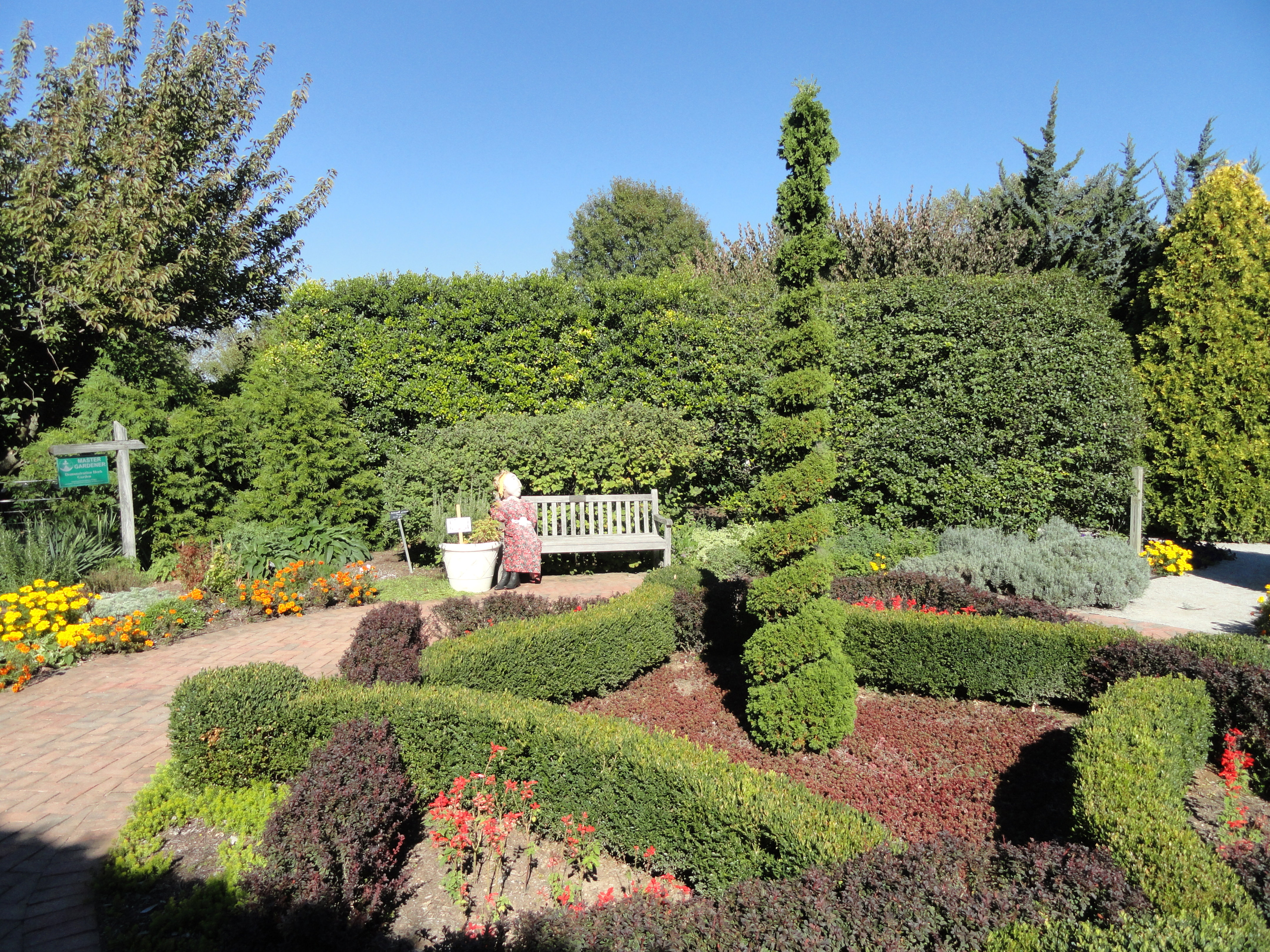

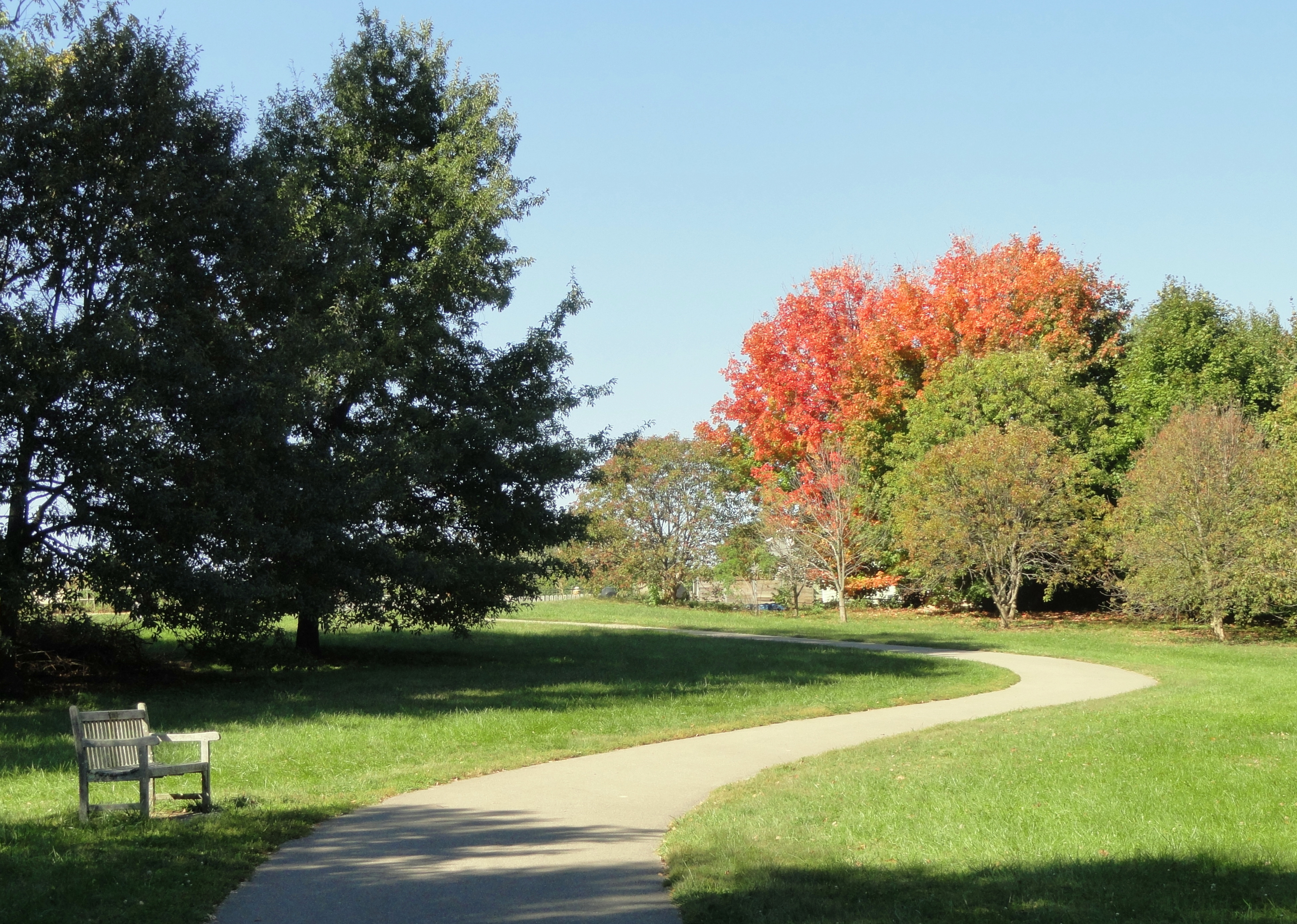

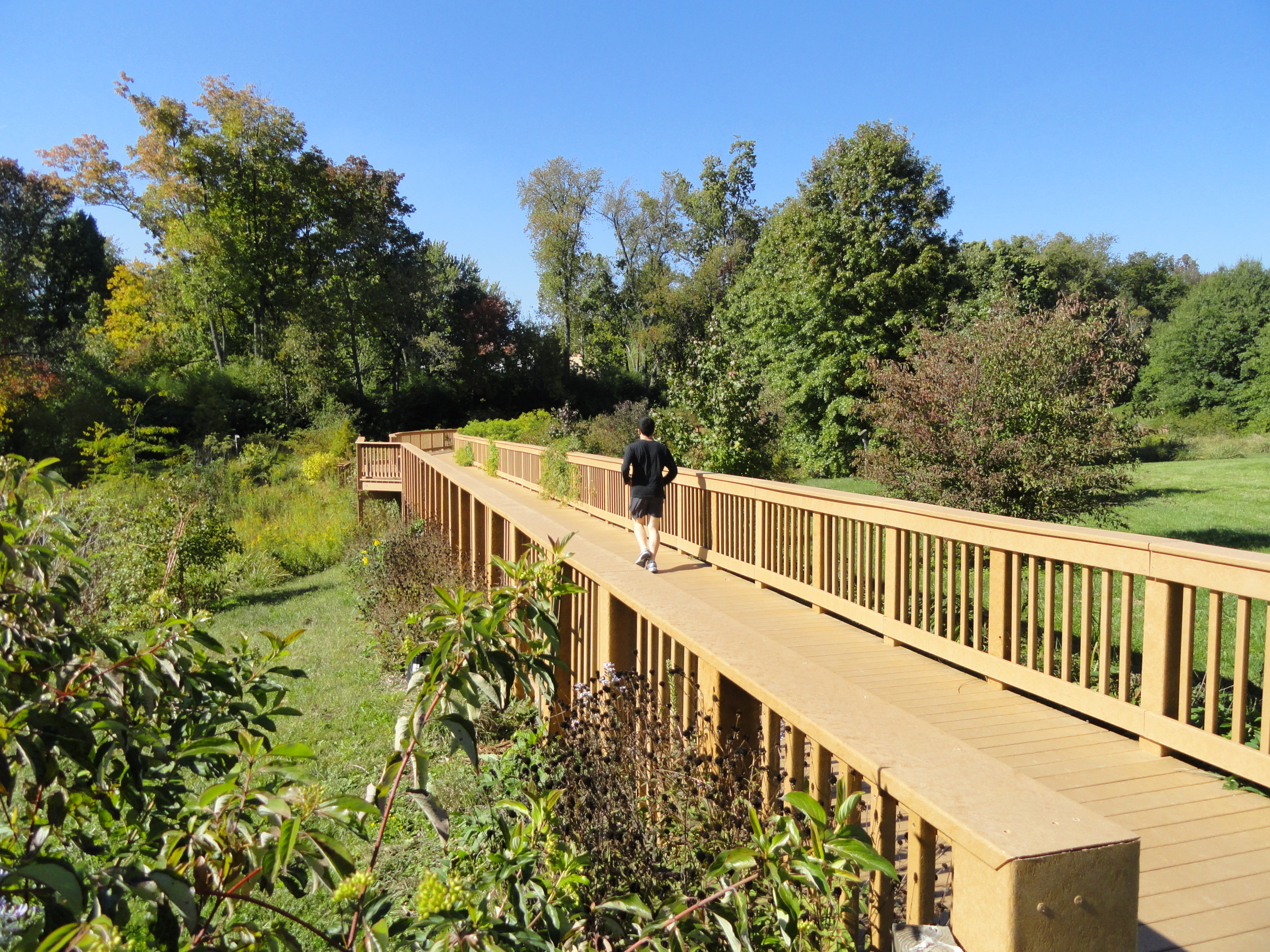

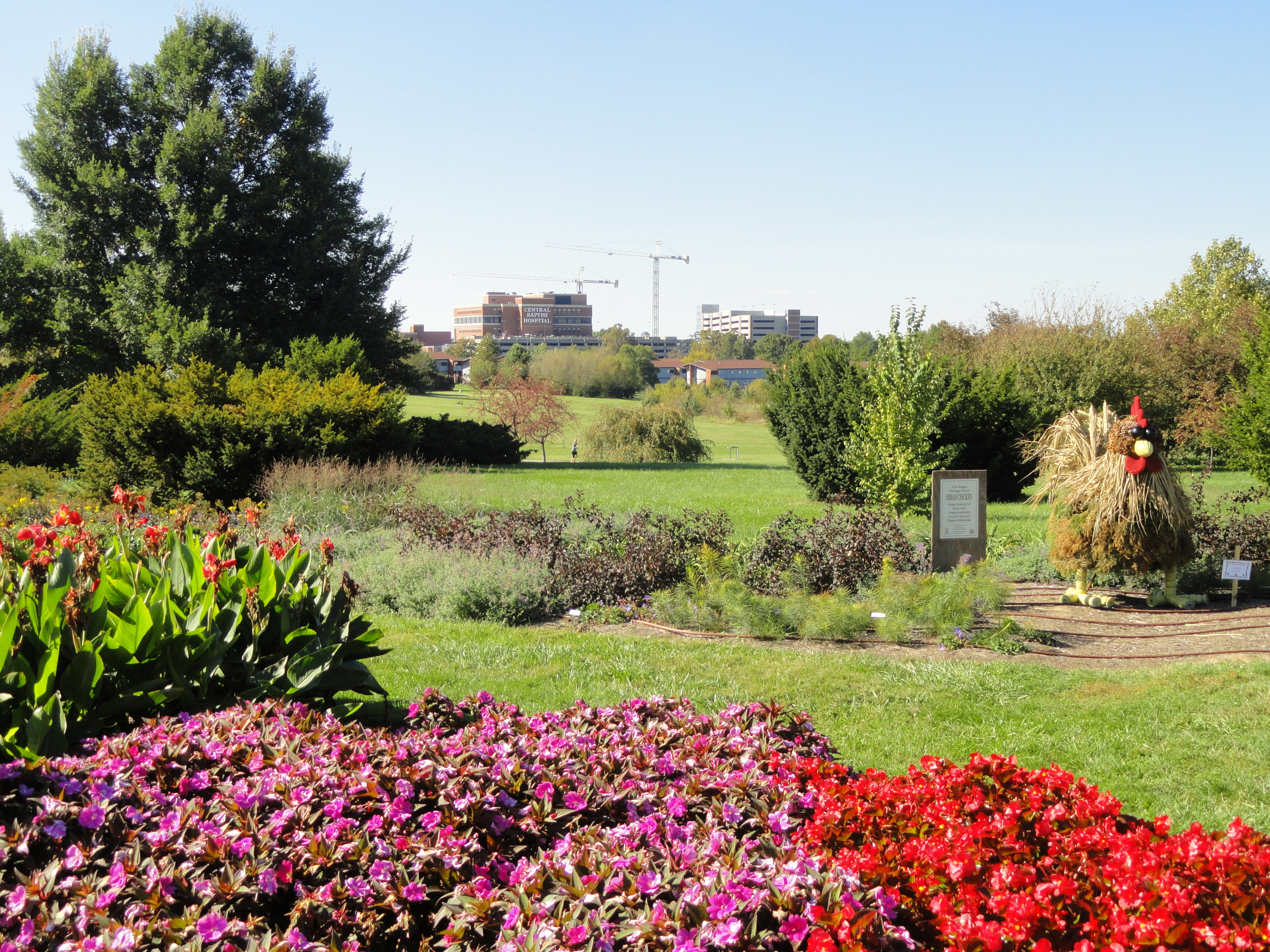

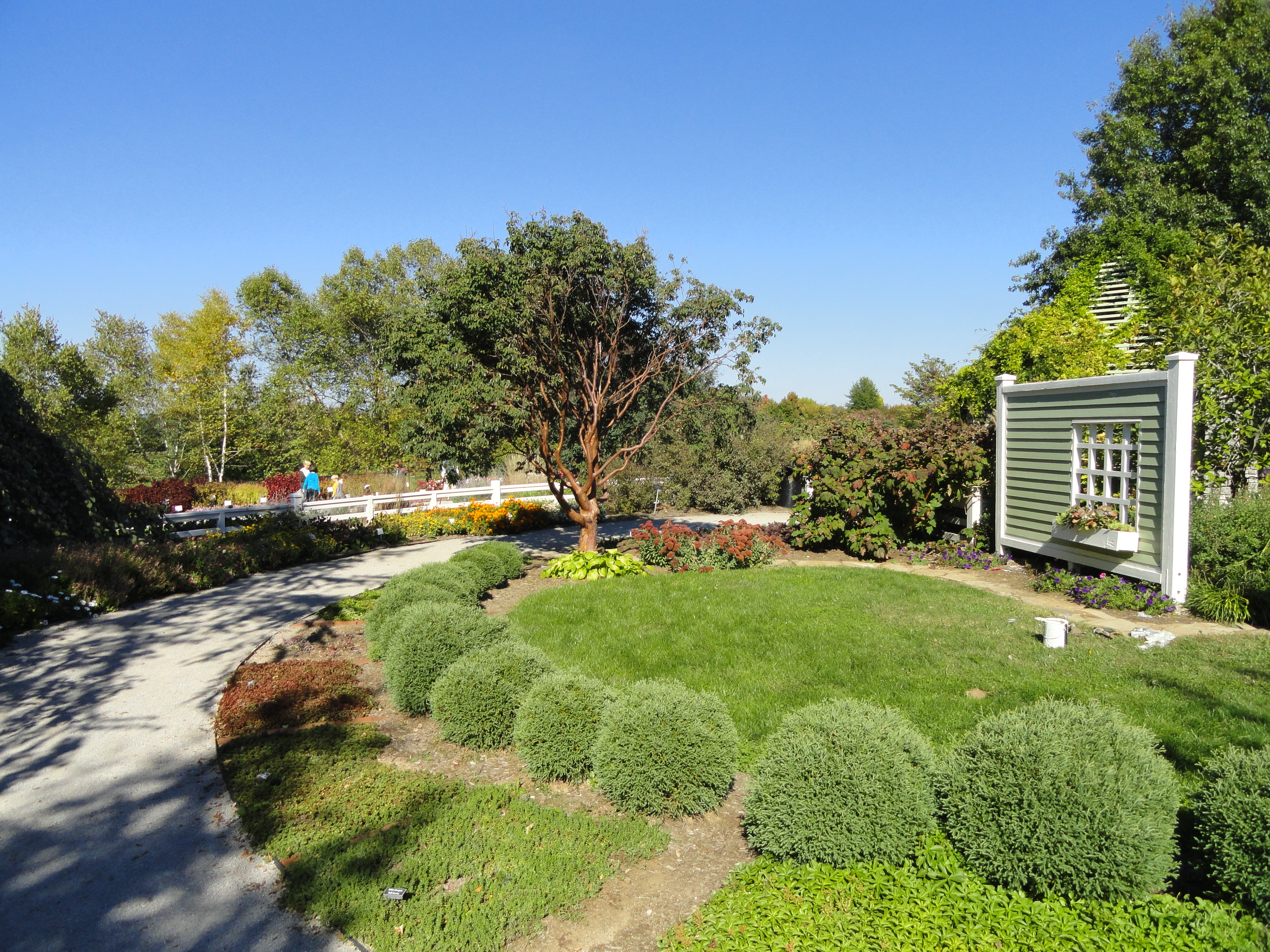

== See also ==
- List of botanical gardens in the United States
