= Santa Fe 3415 =

Preserved American Santa Fe 3400 class 4-6-2 locomotive

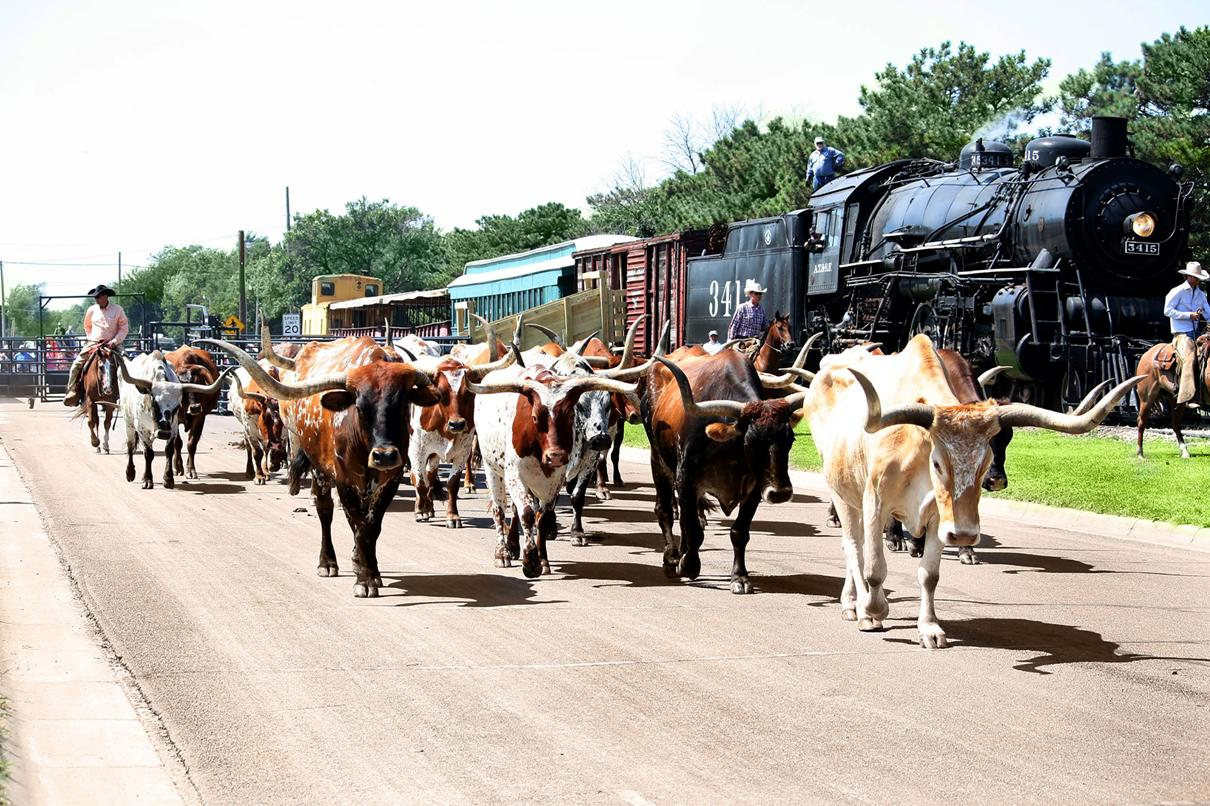
- No. 3415 passing by some cattle walking in Abilene, Kansas
Type and origin
- Power type: Steam
- Designer: John Purcell
- Builder: Baldwin Locomotive Works
- Serial number: 51861
- Build date: June 1919
- Rebuilder: Atchison, Topeka and Santa Fe Railway
- Rebuild date: February 1942
Specifications
- Configuration
  - Whyte: 4-6-2
  - UIC: 2'C1'h
- Gauge: 4 ft 8 1/2 in (1,435 mm)
- Driver dia.: 74 in (1.880 m)
- Wheelbase: 35.25 ft (10.74 m)
  - Engine: 72.06 ft (21.96 m)
  - Drivers: 13.67 ft (4.17 m)
- Axle load: 61,350 lb (27.8 t)
- Adhesive weight: 179,550 lb (81.4 t)
- Loco weight: 300,950 lb (136.5 t)
- Tender weight: 233,720 lb (106.0 t)
- Total weight: 534,670 lb (242.5 t)
- Fuel type: New: Coal; Now: Oil
- Fuel capacity: Coal: 16 t (16 long tons; 18 short tons); Oil: 3,300 US gal (12,000 L; 2,700 imp gal)
- Water cap.: 12,000 US gal (45,000 L; 10,000 imp gal)
- Firebox
  - Grate area: 66.80 sq ft (6.206 m^{2})
- Boiler pressure: 200 psi (1.38 MPa)
- Feedwater heater: Elesco
- Heating surface
  - Firebox: 269 sq ft (25.0 m^{2})
- Cylinders: Two, outside
- Cylinder size: 25 in × 28 in (635 mm × 711 mm)
- Valve gear: Walschaerts
- Valve type: Piston valves
- Loco brake: Air
- Train brakes: Air
- Couplers: Knuckle
Performance figures
- Tractive effort: 40,203 lbf (178.8 kN)
- Factor of adh.: 4.47
Career
- Operators: Atchison, Topeka and Santa Fe Railway; Abilene and Smoky Valley Railroad
- Class: 3400
- Number in class: 16th of 50
- Numbers: ATSF 3415
- Retired: July 29, 1953
- Preserved: December 9, 1955
- Restored: November 11, 2008
- Current owner: Abilene and Smoky Valley Railroad
- Disposition: Undergoing 1,472-day inspection and overhaul
- ATSF Steam Locomotive No. 3415
- U.S. National Register of Historic Places
- Location within Kansas Location within the United States
- Location: 411 South Elm Street., Abilene, Kansas
- Coordinates: 38°54′49.3″N 97°13′17.7″W
- Built: 1919
- Built by: Baldwin Locomotive Works
- NRHP reference No.: 12000203
- Added to NRHP: April 16, 2012

Atchison, Topeka and Santa Fe 3415 is a preserved 3400 class 4-6-2 "Pacific" type steam locomotive, built in June 1919 by the Baldwin Locomotive Works (BLW) for the Atchison, Topeka and Santa Fe Railway (ATSF). It is preserved and operated by the Abilene and Smoky Valley Railroad (ASV) and is the only operating steam locomotive in Kansas.

== History ==
=== Revenue service ===
No. 3415 was built by the Baldwin Locomotive Works (BLW) in Philadelphia, Pennsylvania, in June 1919 as the sixteenth member of the Atchison, Topeka and Santa Fe Railway's (ALCO) fifty 3400 class locomotives. The 3400 class was designed by John Purcell, and this was also the last class of 4-6-2s bought by the Santa Fe. The class was similar to the United States Railroad Administration's Heavy Pacifics in its tube and flue counts, but it was also fitted with a grate area similar in size to the USRA's Light Pacifics, and it was delivered with driving wheels close in size to the latter. The first forty locomotives initially burned coal, but were later converted to burn oil while being rebuilt between 1936 and 1947.

The 3400 class locomotives were initially assigned to pull top-tier heavy passenger trains at high speeds throughout divisions with moderate grades, and No. 3415, in particular, pulled such trains through the Kansas City-La Junta and Newton-Galveston divisions. On December 31, 1934, No. 3415 suffered a broken bell ringer valve while in Carrollton, Missouri, and one crew member was injured. After the Santa Fe invested in adding diesel locomotives to their roster, No. 3415 was reassigned to pull freight and mail trains throughout Kansas, Missouri, and Oklahoma, until it was retired on July 29, 1953. The Santa Fe subsequently donated the locomotive to the city of Abilene on December 9, 1955, for static display in Eisenhower Park.

=== Preservation ===
On April 25, 1996, the city of Abilene decided to redevelop the park, and they removed No. 3415 from its display location and donated it to the nearby Abilene and Smoky Valley Railroad (ASV), who put it on display near their depot. In August 2005, the ASV decided to restore No. 3415 to operating condition for use on their tourist excursions. The locomotive was moved inside the ASV's locomotive facility, and restoration work was started by Wasatch Railroad Contractors from Cheyenne, Wyoming.

=== Excursion service ===
No. 3415 was test fired on November 8, 2008, and made its first movements under its own power three days later for the first time in fifty-four years. After being inspected by the Federal Railroad Administration (FRA) in December, the engine was certified to operate and it hauled its first inaugural run the following year on May 23, 2009, for the next twelve years it subsequently pulling tourist trains over the ASV's ex-Chicago, Rock Island and Pacific trackage between Abilene and Enterprise. However, it was limited to operate at fifteen miles per hour, due to the rails lacking the strength to support trains that traveled at higher speeds.

After the end of the 2022 operating season, No. 3415 was originally supposed to be taken out of service for its 1,472-day inspection and overhaul, which was required by the Federal Railroad Administration. However, in February 2023, the FRA unexpectedly informed the ASV that they had one year left to operate No. 3415 before the inspection and rebuild had to take place. The railroad subsequently used the locomotive to pull additional trains for their 2023 operating season, including some trains that were dedicated to the railroad's 30th anniversary in June.

No. 3415 made its last run on October 7, 2023, before being taken out of service for its federally mandated 15-year overhaul. The railroad originally planned to have No. 3415 back in steam again for America's United States Semiquincentennial in 2026. In January 2026, it was announced that No. 3415 will return to service by Labor Day weekend of 2027.

== Historical significance ==
No. 3415 was added to the National Register of Historic Places on April 16, 2012.

== Bibliography ==
- Macrae, Albert, ed. (December 1922). The Santa Fe Magazine. Vol. 17. 18 East Huron Street, Chicago: Santa Fe Magazine.
- TWENTY-FOURTH ANNUAL REPORT OF THE CHIEF INSPECTOR BUREAU OF LOCOMOTIVE INSPECTION (24th ed.). Washington, D.C.: Interstate Commerce Commission. 1935.
