= Abilene Trail =

The Abilene Trail was a cattle trail leading from Texas to Abilene, Kansas. Its exact route is disputed owing to its many offshoots, but it crossed the Red River just east of Henrietta, Texas, and continued north across the Indian Territory to Caldwell, Kansas and on past Wichita and Newton to Abilene. The first herds were probably driven over it in 1866, though it was not named until Abilene was established in 1867.

The earlier Shawnee-Arbuckle cattle trail was used by trail drivers from 1867 through 1870. According to Gary and Margaret Kraisinger, "When Fort Arbuckle was abandoned and Fort Sill had become established, trail drivers moved their pathway farther west to a more direct route to Abilene, Kansas. From the 1860s through the 1880s, cowboys 'went up the trail' and 'pointed them north' to Kansas...the drovers often called the trail 'the Kansas Trail,' or the 'Abilene Trail,' because they were going in that direction."

In 1867, Joseph G. McCoy developed stockyards at Abilene, along the Union Pacific Eastern Division Railroad, since "the country was entirely unsettled, well watered, excellent grass, and nearly the entire area of [the] country was adopted to holding cattle." According to Gary and Margaret Kraisinger, "Because it was late in the season, he employed W.W. Sugg, a stockman friend from his home state of Illinois, to ride south to intercept herds trailing to Missouri on the Shawnee Trail." On 5 September, the first rail carloads of cattle were on their way to Chicago.

In 1867, McCoy reported 35,000 head of cattle had arrived in Abilene. With more Texas cattlemen knowing of the shorter route, more than 300,000 Texas longhorns used the trail over the next two seasons. The trail eventually became known as the Chisholm Trail since it used the pre-existing Chisholm Wagon Road, and by 1871 Abilene was no longer accepting Texas cattle with Newton, Wichita and Ellsworth becoming the new cattle towns.

The country about Abilene was settling up quickly at this time. Grazing lands were becoming scarcer and these conditions were such that many of the settlers objected to the pasturing of the great herds in the vicinity. In the year 1872, Wichita was in possession of the trade that Abilene had enjoyed for several years prior due to the completion of the Santa Fe railroad. This gave Wichita the needed railroad facilities. From 1867 to 1871 about 10,000 cars of livestock were shipped out of Abilene and in 1872 about 80,000 head of cattle were shipped from Wichita.

The settlement of the valleys of the Arkansas and the Ninnescah rivers rendered it impractical to reach Wichita shipping yards after 1873 and the loading of cattle was transferred to points on the railroad farther west, finally stopping at Dodge City. The use of the Abilene cattle trail ended in 1887.
