= Bear River City, Wyoming =

Ghost town in Uinta County, Wyoming, United States

Coordinates: 41°10′23″N 110°52′12″W

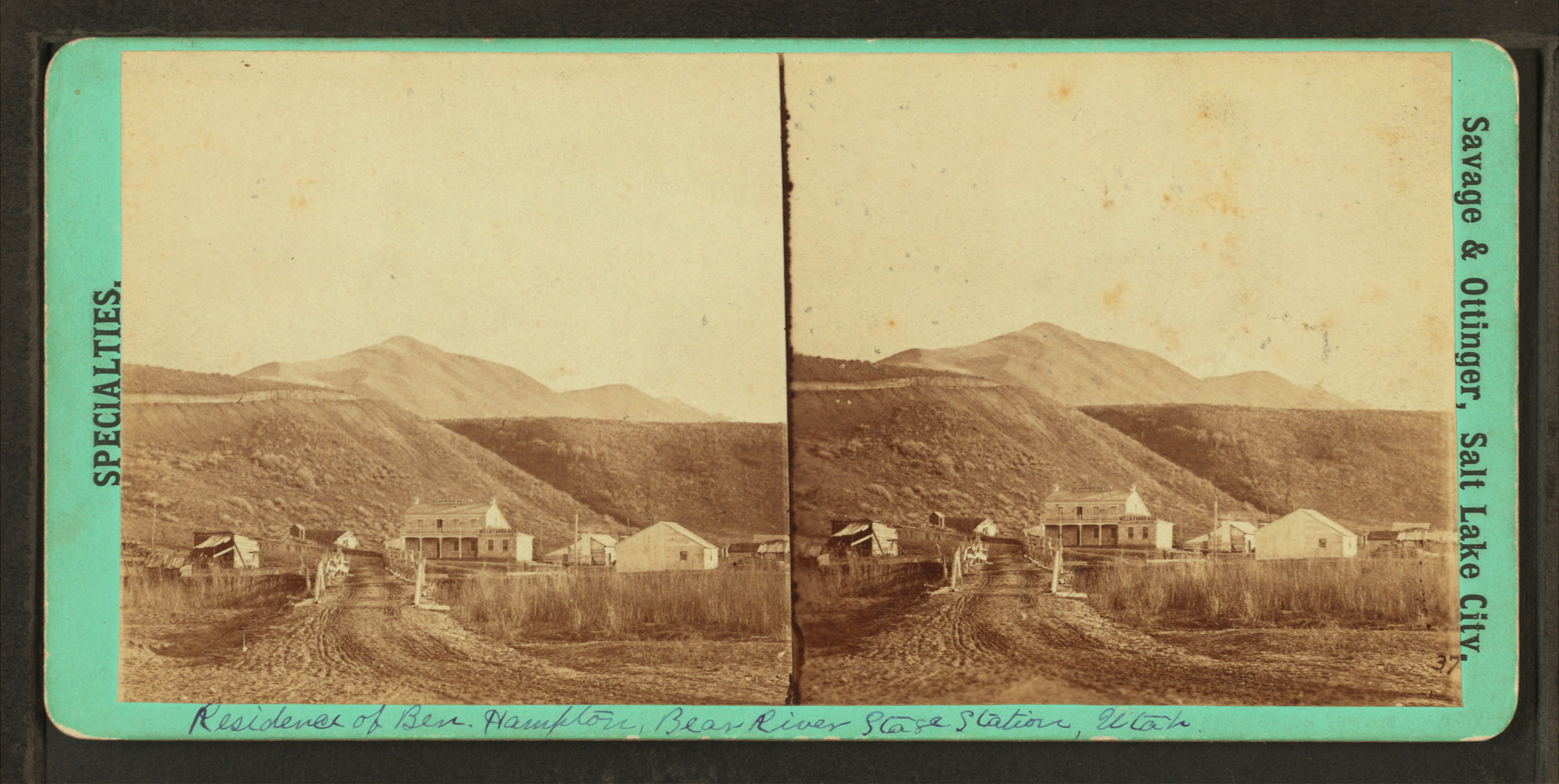
Residence of Ben Hampton, Bear River stage station, Utah Territory (Wyoming)

Bear River City is a ghost town that was briefly, 1867–1868, a rapidly thrown together railroad town. It was ocated approximately ten miles southeast of Evanston, on the Overland Trail and the Emigrant Trail in the Utah Territory.

It is best known for the "Bear River City Riot" that occurred on November 19, 1868.

== History ==
The town can trace its origins back to the early 1860s. A businessman from Salt Lake City named Joseph F. Nounnan was contracted to construct the Union Pacific railroad grade in the area where it crossed the Bear River in southwestern Wyoming, then the Utah Territory. He constructed a supply depot and lodging for his men on a site along the route of the Overland Stage as well as the path of the California and Mormon emigrant trails. Due to its excellent location, the city grew rapidly. At its peak, the town had its own newspaper office, and a red light district. The town served as a passover for miners, railroad workers, and hunters heading farther into the west.

== Bear River City Riot of November 19, 1868 ==
The "Bear River City Riot" of November 19, 1868 began following the vigilante lynching of a murder suspect who worked for the railroad. This resulted in friends to the lynched man revolting against the vigilantes, which caused the town to erupt in violence. Town Marshal Thomas J. Smith, only recently appointed, immediately took a stand against both factions. There were numerous shootouts during the riot, and almost the entire town was torched, including most town government buildings. Smith stood his ground, but was unable to stop the onslaught of several hundred rioters, with the result being sixteen people killed.

Town citizens repelled an assault on the town jail, resulting in the deaths of numerous rioters, and one Bear River City citizen, Steve Stokes. A US Cavalry troop was dispatched from Fort Bridger, and martial law was imposed. The riot essentially ended any future the small town might have had, and it soon became deserted. Marshal Smith moved on to eventually become the Marshal of Abilene, Kansas. His stand during the riot resulted in his nickname, "Bear River" Smith.

== See also ==
- List of ghost towns in Wyoming
