= Lebold Mansion =

Historic house in Kansas, United States

- C. H. Lebold House
- U.S. National Register of Historic Places
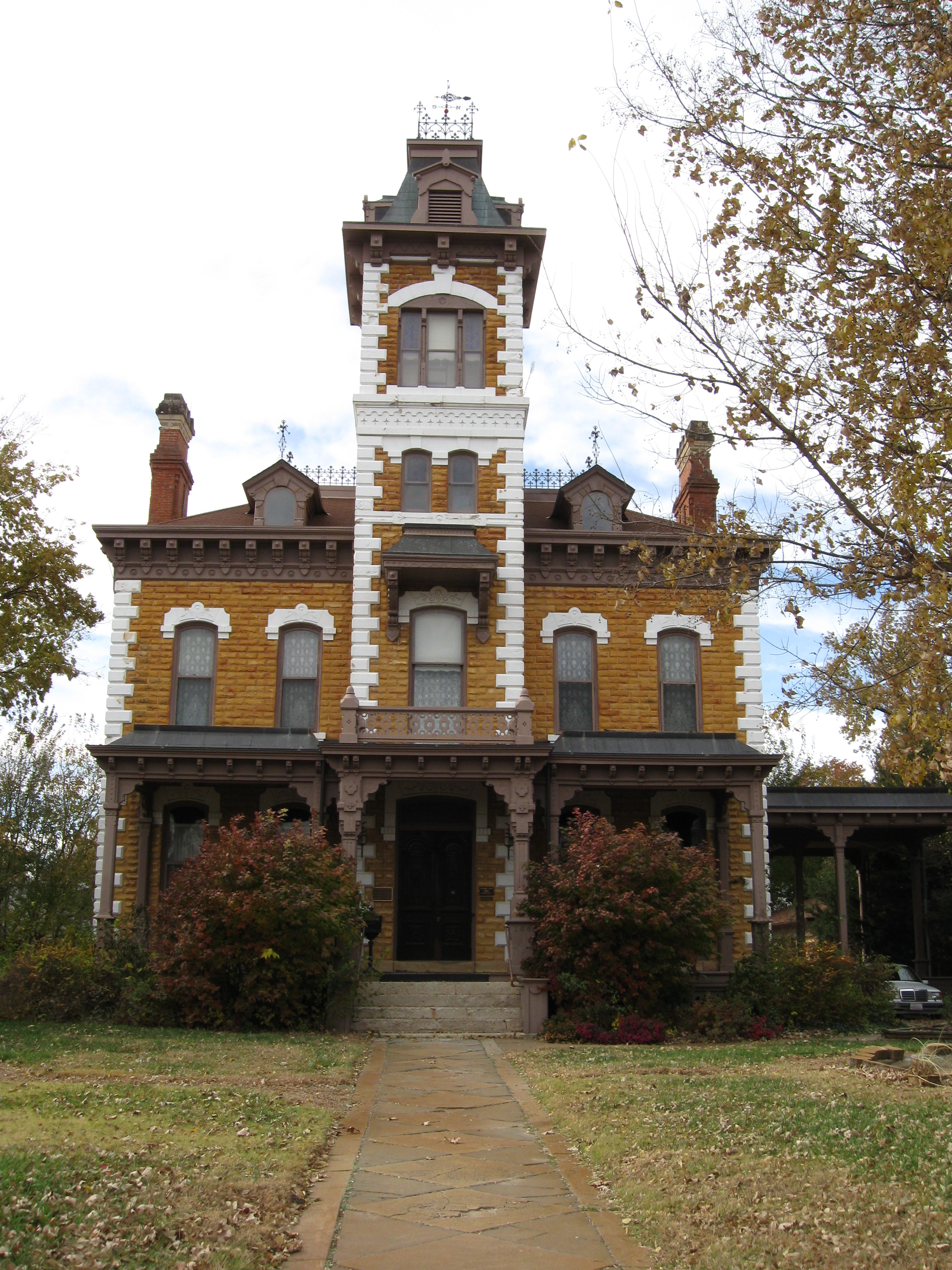

- Location within Kansas Location within the United States
- Location: Abilene, Kansas
- Coordinates: 38°54′56.02″N 97°13′24.27″W
- Built: 1880
- Architectural style: Renaissance
- NRHP reference No.: 73000751
- Added to NRHP: May 8, 1973

Lebold Mansion is a Victorian-era house in Abilene, Kansas, United States. Lebold Mansion was added to the National Register of Historic Places in 1973.

== History ==
Constructed of native Kansas limestone, the mansion was built in 1880 by banker Conrad Lebold.

In 1857 Tim and Eliza Hersey, the founders and first inhabitants of Abilene, built a stone dugout in the location where the Lebold Mansion stands today. The Hersey dugout was incorporated into the construction of the mansion's tower and is preserved as part of the foundation located at the tower's base. Visitors still can view the dugout when touring the home.

The Mansion has served many purposes over the years. In the 1920s it was redecorated by C. L. Brown as a boarding house for the young female operators of his United Telephone Company. In 1930 it became an orphanage and then served as an apartment building from 1940 to 1970.

The house was added to the National Register of Historic Places in 1973.

It has survived intact and was maintained as a historic house museum from 1973 until 2010. It was considered by many to be one of the finest Victorian decorative art museums in the midwest. It was featured in Victorian Homes Magazine and Victorian Decorating and life styles Magazine.

In 2000, The Lebold Mansion was sold to Victorian Interiors Restoration Service from San Francisco, who redecorated Its 23 rooms with period furniture, wallpaper, drapes, and other furnishings from their private collection and then used the Mansion as a showroom, tour house for the next 10 years. Victorian Interiors sold the Mansion in 2010. It twice changed hands to new owners when in June, 2021, the mansion was sold as a foreclosure but approximately $750,000 worth of vintage period wallpaper remained, as well as an 8' x 8' commissioned painting on canvas of Venus and her servants that is mounted on the ceiling of one of the first-floor rooms.

The new owner, Joseph Tatner, is a published author, professional business and technical writer, computer analyst, business and technical consultant, plus a professional actor, singer, dancer, director, choreographer, and producer with numerous credits, awards, and public recognition. Having worked in four different Ritz-Carlton Hotels, his goal for the mansion is to provide an experience with something new to enjoy. He is attempting to renovate the property himself and started a Lebold Mansion GoFundMe page.

The residence has been rented out twice for film productions: "The Haunting of Pottersfield" and (in June 2021) "The Location Scout." The property and individual rooms are still available for films, as well as professional or Cosplay photo shoots. The popular "Apocalypse Basement" is decorated to look just like a room from the computer game Fallout (3, 4, or New Vegas). The Fallout decor can be removed to be used as a Zombie Apocalypse scene or dilapidated ammo depot.

== Gallery ==
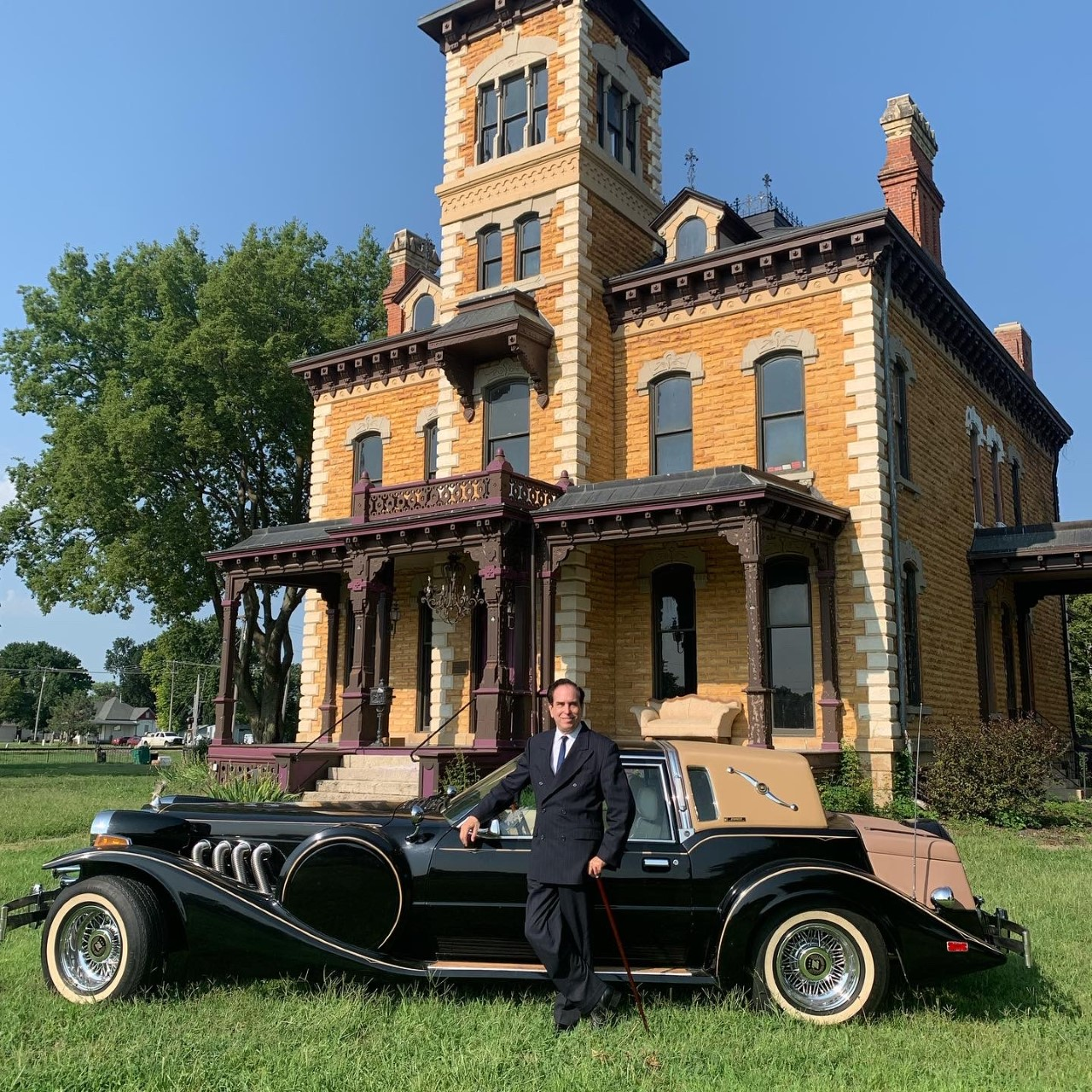

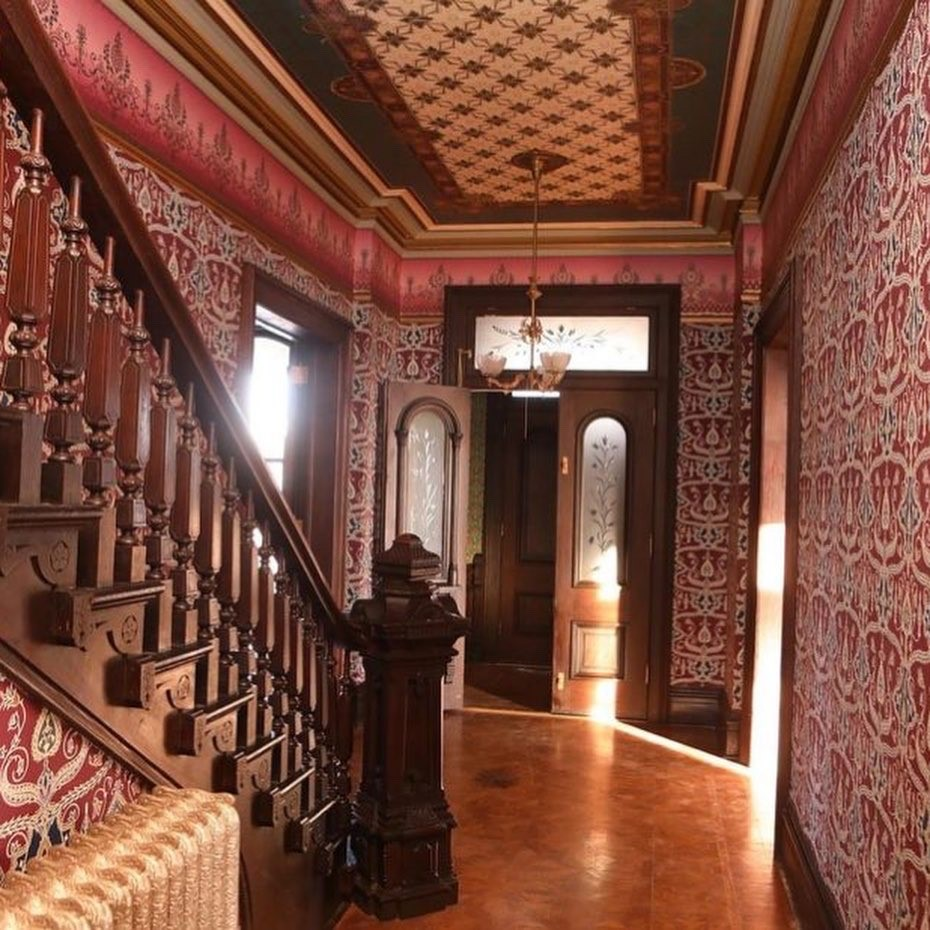

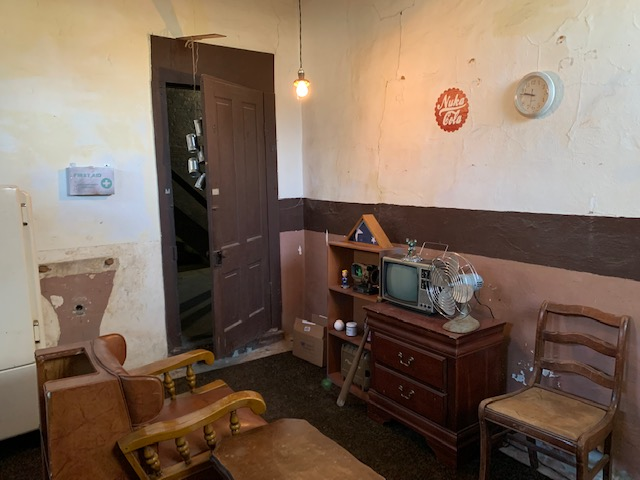

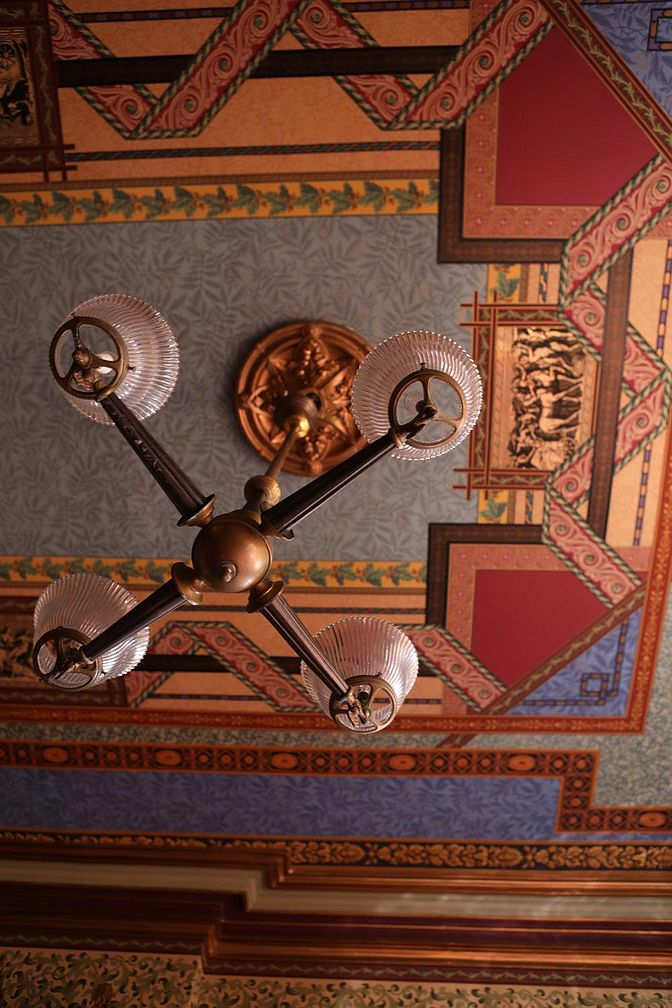
