= Wasatch Railroad Contractors =

Former American railroad equipment repair company

Wasatch Railroad Contractors was a railroad equipment repair business founded in 1999 by John E. Rimmasch in Heber, Utah. The company specialized in historic railcar and steam locomotive repairs, and it employed former Union Pacific Steam manager Steve Lee. The company’s headquarters was relocated to Cheyenne, Wyoming in 2005, and the company subsequently opened a steam locomotive shop and a railcar repair facility in Shoshoni, Wyoming.

A string of lawsuits along with a fatal accident at the Shoshoni shop led to the company filing for bankruptcy in late 2021, and it was permanently shut down in early 2022. Wasatch Railroad Contractors and John Rimmasch were charged with fraud due to a mismanaged repair of a passenger coach owned by Steamtown National Historic Site, and were found guilty by a federal jury in April 2022.

== Founding and operation ==
Wasatch Railroad Contractors was founded by John E. Rimmasch, while he was employed as Chief Mechanical Officer of the Heber Valley Railroad, where he oversaw the maintenance of Union Pacific 618 and Great Western No. 75. Both locomotives, along with visiting Nevada Northern No. 93, participated in the 2002 Winter Olympics during Rimmasch's tenure at Heber. After Rimmasch left his position at Heber, he relocated his business to Cheyenne, Wyoming in 2005. Prior to founding Wasatch, Rimmasch had worked at Lagoon to maintain their Wild Kingdom Train Zoo. During Wasatch's existence, they served many live steam operations at various amusement parks.

The company picked up various contracts for restoration jobs, as time progressed, including a former Jim Crow-era Southern Railway passenger coach, which was positioned on static display inside the National Museum of African American History and Culture. Other prominent jobs included work for the Golden Spike National Historic Park, the Nevada Northern Railway Museum, and the Hawaiian Railway Society. They were also hired by the Abilene and Smoky Valley Railroad to rebuild their locomotive, Santa Fe 3415. Another notable project performed by Wasatch was the restoration of a caboose for display in Black Canyon of the Gunnison National Park. Wasatch's largest static restoration jobs were on former Union Pacific No. 4004, a Big Boy located in Cheyenne near Wasatch's headquarters, and Union Pacific 4023 in Kenefick Park. Wasatch also assisted with work on the Union Pacific Steam Program, aiding in the 2006 renovation of the two auxiliary water tender's used behind No. 844 and No. 3985.

Former Union Pacific Steam Program manager Steve Lee joined Wasatch in 2010, and he participated in such projects as relocation of UP switcher No. 4420 to a preserved roundhouse in Evanston, Wyoming, and the Louisville and Nashville Railroad 2132 project in Corbin, Kentucky, which was championed by Lee, as he was a Kentucky state native. During the Corbin project, Wasatch, claiming cost overruns, attempted to bill $20,000 to the Corbin Tourism Commission, in addition to doing uncontracted work on an attached caboose, and it resulted in an eventual contract award for the caboose. Lee also headed a Wasatch-supported project to rebuild Western Pacific switcher No. 165 at the Western Pacific Railroad Museum in Portola, California.

Wasatch expanded from their steam and historic repair shop by opening their Shoshoni railcar repair facility in 2015 after purchasing the previous owner of the shop, Dimec Rail Services. In 2021, Wasatch publicly opposed the planned Kansas City Southern Railroad and Canadian Pacific Railway merger in a filing with the Surface Transportation Board.

== Mechanical issues ==
The Big South Fork Scenic Railway hired Wasatch to perform boiler work on their former Union Railroad 0-6-0 locomotive, No. 14 (slated to be re-lettered as Kentucky and Tennessee No. 14). Following Wasatch's work on K&T 14, an inspection was performed on the engine by Jason Sobczynski of Next Generation Rail Services, and he found evidence of shoddy restoration work. The K&T 14 inspection revealed Wasatch had used threaded rod in place of the correct flexible stay bolts, along with other errors in welding and machining. The matter went to court, which ruled in late 2020 that Wasatch owed $730,284.60 in damages to the Big South Fork Scenic Railway due to the shoddy locomotive work.

The Como Roundhouse project, operated by the South Park Rail Society, suffered similar mechanical faults on a locomotive Wasatch had repaired for them, former Klondike Mines Railway No. 4 “Klondike Kate”. Klondike Kate was returned from Wasatch to Como in 2017, and it briefly operated at the Como site before mechanical problems sidelined the locomotive. Instead of pursuing legal options against Wasatch, the society chose to crowdfund the needed money to repair the locomotive for a return service on their own.

== Shoshoni railcar explosion ==
On April 21, 2021, a tank car used to carry hazardous materials exploded inside Wasatch's Shoshoni shop, killing two employees, 28-year-old Dallas Mitchell and 21-year-old Daniel Conway. A subsequent investigation of the accident suggested that metal grinding inside the car had sparked while the men were working inside the tank, resulting in its ignition and explosion. First responders reported high amounts of dangerous fumes lingering on site at the time of their arrival. Conway was a recent high school graduate, and Mitchell was a father of five children; a fund was set up in their memory after the accident.

== Bankruptcy, dissolution, and criminal case ==
On September 14, 2021, Wasatch Railroad Contractors filed for Chapter 11 bankruptcy. While the bankruptcy was ongoing, Wasatch continued to attempt to operate with Rimmasch advocating to the Cheyenne City Council an idea for an expanded visitor center at the Union Pacific railyards within downtown Cheyenne. With no ability to financially recover due to a lack of new contracts, Wasatch permanently shut down on February 8, 2022.

The United States Department of the Interior, the Office of the Inspector General, and the Environmental Protection Agency launched an investigation of Wasatch over a failure to complete a contract for the National Park Service; the restoration of a former Central Railroad of New Jersey passenger coach for Steamtown National Historic Site. Wasatch had contracted the job in 2016, but the federal government accused Wasatch of billing them for work not being completed, leading to trial. The investigation into Wasatch's conduct also discovered improper asbestos handling and other violations of their contract with the NPS. The investigation also accused Wasatch of violating the Davis-Bacon Act of 1931 via underpaying the employees associated with the project, with Rimmasch accused of sending false payrolls to the US Government as a cover-up of the wage discrepancy. The total charges included five counts of wire fraud and one count of endangerment. Rimmasch and Wasatch were found guilty on all counts on April 14, 2022, and sentencing was set for July of that year. The sentence was given on July 5; Rimmasch was required to serve thirty months in prison and three years of probation upon release, along with paying for fines and working for community service.
