= KABI (AM) =

- Abilene, Kansas; United States
- Frequency: 1560 kHz
- Branding: The General 1560 AM 95.9 FM

Programming
- Format: Classic country
- Affiliations: Westwood One, Local Radio Networks

Ownership
- Owner: Christopher Miller; (Meridian Media, LLC)

History
- First air date: April 8, 1963
- Former call signs: KABI (1963–1985); KSAJ (1985–1987)
- Call sign meaning: Kansas ABIlene

Technical information
- Licensing authority: FCC
- Facility ID: 18054
- Class: D
- Power: 250 watts daytime 58 watts night
- Transmitter coordinates: 38°55′46″N 97°14′46″W
- Translator: 95.9 K240EX (Abilene)

Links
- Public license information: Public file; LMS
- Webcast: Listen Live
- Website: kabiabilene.com

KABI (1560 AM) is a radio station licensed to Abilene, Kansas, broadcasting a classic hits format. The station first went on the air in 1963, broadcasting from the lowest level of the Sunflower Hotel in downtown Abilene. Wyman Schnepp was the original owner and general manager. His wife Willa was its first engineer. Schnepp only had ownership for 4 years before he sold KABI to Norton Warner, of Lincoln, Nebraska, in 1967. J.K. Vanier and Jerry Hinrikus (EBC Radio) of Salina, Kansas, bought KABI and its sister FM, KSAJ, in late 1991. Then in January 2004 Morris Communications (MCC Radio) acquired KABI as part of a 6-station group purchase from EBC. Most recently Alpha Media, LLC., bought KABI on September 1, 2015, and, almost immediately, spun it off to Rocking M Media.

Among KABI's most famous radio voices were Pug Phillips and Gary Houser. Pug had a daily radio feature in the late 1960s. While Gary was the most enduring employee, hosting the morning show on-and-off from 1963 until his death in 2014. Veteran radio personality John Anderson is the current Wake Up Call Host.

In the early 1980s, the KABI broadcast studios would move to 2nd and Broadway, into the old Citizens Bank building. Briefly, from 1985 to 1987, KABI changed call letters to KSAJ-AM and simulcast programming with KSAJ-FM. Then, in June 1987 it resumed being KABI with separate programming.

Effective October 1, 2020 Rocking M Media sold KABI, three sister stations, and construction permits for two translators to Meridian Media, LLC for $1,755,917.55. Shortly after that in September 2021 KABI would simulcast its programming once again with a 250-watt FM translator at 95.9 MHZ.
