= Phil Coe =

Old West gambler

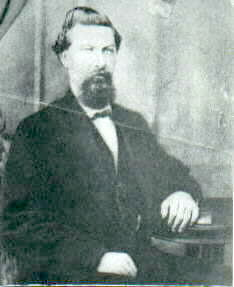

Personal details
- Born: Philip Houston Coe; July 13, 1839 Gonzales, Republic of Texas
- Died: October 9, 1871 (aged 32) Abilene, Kansas, United States
- Parents: Phillip Haddox (father); Elizabeth Parker Coe (mother)
- Occupation: Soldier, gambler and businessman

Military service
- Allegiance: Confederate Army
- Commands: 36th Texas Cavalry Regiment; 2nd Texas Cavalry Regiment
- Battles/wars: American Civil War; French intervention in Mexico

Phillip Houston "Phil" Coe (July 13, 1839 Gonzales, Texas – October 9, 1871 Abilene, Kansas), was a soldier, Old West gambler, and businessman from Texas. He became the business partner of gunfighter Ben Thompson in Abilene, Kansas, with whom he opened the Bull's Head Saloon. He was killed by marshal "Wild Bill" Hickok in a street brawl.

== Early life ==
Phillip Houston Coe was born July 17, 1839 to Phillp Haddox and Elizabeth (Parker) Coe in Gonzales, Texas, one of the earliest settlements west of the Colorado River and was the fourth of 9 children.

== Military career ==
Phillip Coe was enrolled on March 24, 1862 at Belmont in Gonzales County. Texas by William L. Foster and 3 days later was mustered in at San Antonio, Texas by E.W. Stevens. A roster of Company F, 2nd. Regiment Texas Mounted Rifles (Confederate Texas Troops) showed him as Lieutenant with a commission date of September 21, 1862. Coe was transferred on December 11, 1862 to William G. Tobin's Company F of Colonel C.L. Pyron's Regiment, with a rank of Private. The sole document bearing Coe's signature was a pay voucher, showing he received $100 for one month's service from March 31, 1863 to April 30, 1863: This document acknowledged payment from W.M. Wilby, Assistant Quartermaster, Confederate States of America and was signed "P.H. Coe 1st Leut co (F). 2 T M R [2nd. Texas Mounted Rifles]." It is possible Phillip Coe fought under Emperor Maximillian of Mexico as a soldier-of-fortune with his friend Ben Thompson after his service in the Confederate Texas Troops, but no records can confirm so.

== Post-war ==
After the war, Coe traveled through Texas. During his travels, he befriended gunfighter Bill Longley and Ben Thompson, the latter of whom he had met in Mexico. He then settled in Salina, Kansas, where he became a saloon owner and gambler. In May 1871, Coe became Ben Thompson's business partner in Abilene, managing the Bull's Head Saloon.

On October 5, 1871, Coe shot at Hickok twice following a street brawl, missing both times. Hickok fired back, shooting Coe in the stomach. Hickok also mistakenly shot and killed his deputy, Mike Williams, who was running to his aid. Williams was due to return to Kansas City that night.

Phil Coe remained in the town for several days, before dying on October 9, 1871. He was Hickok's last known killing. Coe's body was taken to Brenham, Texas, to relatives of his. He was buried there in Prairie Lea Cemetery.

== Bibliography ==
- Parsons, Chuck (1984). Phil Coe, Texas Gambler. Wolfe City, Texas: Henington Publishing Company. p. 40.
- Rosa, Joseph G. (1964). They Called Him Wild Bill: The Life and Adventures of James Butler Hickok. Norman: University of Oklahoma Press. pp. 278.
- Streeter, Floyd Benjamin (1957). Ben Thompson. New York: Fell.
- Walton, W. M. (1884). The Life and Adventures of Ben Thompson: The Famous Texan. Austin: Steck. p. 420. ISBN 9781530581283.
