= Pat Desmond =

American lawman and gunman

- Born: c. 1842; Cork County, Ireland
- Died: February 28, 1890 (aged 47–48); Ogden, Utah
- Cause of death: Gunshot wounds
- Occupations: lawmen, gunman

Pat Desmond (c. 1842 – February 28, 1890) was a lawman and gunman of the American Old West. He was listed as one of the twelve most underestimated gunmen of the Old West in the book "Deadly Dozen", written by Robert K. DeArment.

== Early life ==
Desmond was born in County Cork, Ireland, and descended from a long line of noblemen from South Munster, Ireland. His father had been imprisoned along with another relative, an Earl of Desmond, and his property confiscated by the English. In 1864, at the age of 22, Desmond emigrated to the United States. While working in mining camps in the US, he became a member of a revolutionary group called the Fenian Brotherhood, intent on overthrowing the English control in Ireland. The group was victorious in the 1866 Battle of Ridgeway, but ultimately the movement faltered when the United States intervened. Desmond was part of a force led by Fenian General John O'Neil that invaded Canada from Buffalo, New York. Pursued by a US force led by George G. Meade, the Fenian's were chased down and captured.

Desmond left for Chicago, Illinois following his release, and began working for the Chicago and North Western Transportation Company. By 1869, Desmond was working construction in Kansas. A few months later he had arrived in Kit Carson, Colorado, a town that had almost overnight exploded into a population of over 1,500 people. Desmond was appointed town constable, after which he hired Tom "Bear River" Smith as his deputy, and together the two made a name for themselves due to their abilities and controlling the town and its crime rate. By 1870, Smith had gone on to become the Marshal of Abilene, Kansas, where he would ultimately be killed in a gunfight, after which he was replaced by Wild Bill Hickok.

== Life on the frontier ==
Desmond left Kit Carson and owned a restaurant in Golden, Colorado, then later a saloon in Georgetown, Colorado. He went back to work for the railroad, and by 1872 he had married and settled in Pueblo, Colorado. Not long afterward he began working as a deputy for the Pueblo County, Colorado Sheriffs Office. He quickly developed a dangerous reputation, due mostly to his tendency to never back away from a fight. Those who remembered him often indicated that he almost welcomed a fight. This also led to his having a reputation for police brutality.

On December 6, 1877, Desmond arrested Robert Schalme, wanted for the murder of a butcher. Jailing Schalme in Georgetown, a mob shortly thereafter broke into the local jail and lynched him. Desmond would later act as the hangman in the execution of murderer Victor Nunez. In June 1879, Desmond assisted Ford County, Kansas Sheriff Bat Masterson in apprehending a Dodge City, Kansas escapee. That same month he found himself in the middle of the Royal Gorge War, fought between the workers for the Denver & Rio Grande Railroad, and the Santa Fe Railroad, over right of way. On June 11, 1879, Desmond led fifty men in taking over a telegraph office . Several men on both sides were allegedly killed or injured during this time. Ironically, Masterson and noted gunmen Ben Thompson and Doc Holliday were among those in opposition.

Desmond and Pueblo County Sheriff Henley Price were arrested for the assault, and charged with numerous counts of murder. However, the charges were soon dismissed. By now, the newspaper South Pueblo News was hailing Desmond as the "best thief catcher in all the Pueblos". On June 28, 1881, Desmond captured an outlaw believed to be named Henry W. Burton, for a stagecoach robbery, quickly discovering that Burton was also wanted for two armed robberies in Arkansas. On July 1, 1881, Desmond boarded a train bound for Denver, Colorado, to transport Burton into the custody of Federal authorities.

When the train slowed while climbing a steep grade near Castle Rock, Colorado, Burton took advantage of the trains slow speed and jumped off. Desmond immediately pursued him, with both men running into the forest. Desmond fired three rounds, creasing Burton's head with one shot, knocking him to the ground. Upon reaching Denver, Desmond learned that his suspect was actually Hamilton "Ham" White, the most wanted stagecoach robber in the nation, with an outstanding reward on him for $1,200.

== O'Connor/Desmond gunfight ==
Back in Pueblo, on February 11, 1882, Desmond was summoned to Union Station where several African American men and women complained that a local police officer, John T. "Jack" O'Connor had abused them. Desmond located O'Connor, who was intoxicated, and the two became involved in an argument witnessed by Patrolman Rube Gutshall. Desmond fired O'Connor on the spot, enraging the latter. When Desmond went to remove O'Connor's badge, O'Connor punched him in the face, knocking Desmond down to the ground. O'Connor then went for his gun, and Desmond responded by drawing his own.

Desmond fired twice, hitting O'Connor with both rounds, in the left thigh. O'Connor fired three times, missing all three times. Gutshall, Deputy Dave Abrams, and Pinkerton Detective Bill Richardson then wrestled O'Connor into custody. For unknown reasons, no charges were ever filed against O'Connor, and in addition to firing O'Connor, Desmond suspended Gutshall alleging that the latter failed to back him up in the affair. This led to a bitter feud between the police department and the sheriff's office, and eventually the city council fired Desmond over the affair, and reinstated Gutshall and O'Connor. Henry Jameson was appointed as City Marshal to replace Desmond.

Desmond had ample support from citizen groups following this incident to run for the office of mayor, but he declined. He began drinking often, and in the months following the incident he became involved in numerous saloon brawls. In April 1882, his 8-year-old daughter Mamie died from diphtheria, which was ravaging Pueblo. Two weeks later, his 2-year-old son died from the same thing, further driving Desmond into despair. Two other sons were stricken with diphtheria, and hovered near death but survived. His wife, Annie, severely depressed over the loss of their two children, and extremely unhappy due to Desmond's increased drinking and her unhappiness at being in Pueblo all together, took their two remaining sons and moved to Peoria, Illinois. Desmond followed her there, and brought them back to Pueblo. The couple attempted to save the marriage, but divorced in November 1882.

== Detective agency and after ==
Desmond sold off his properties, making in excess of $15,000, and started the Southern Colorado Detective Agency, in association with the Rocky Mountain Detective Agency. He hired several former officers who had supported him during the earlier feud with the police department officials and the city, including Bill Richardson. He then began working as an independent force inside the town, something that was fiercely opposed by Marshal Henry Jameson and his department. Over the next few months, however, the detective agency made more arrests than the city police department, capturing several noted thieves and one murderer. This further led to discontent between Desmond and the police. In May 1883, Desmond captured noted horse thief Joe Ward, which led to a fight between Desmond and several local supporters of Ward.

On February 9, 1883, Desmond became involved in an argument with city police officer R.A. Caldwell, partly due to Caldwell's dislike of Desmond's detective agency, and partly over a local woman that both men had been involved with romantically. When Desmond was not looking, Caldwell hit him over the head with his pistol, causing the pistol to discharge and crease Desmond's head. Desmond recovered his senses partially, and staggered down the street. Recovering a few minutes later, Desmond took a pistol from a friend and returned in search of Caldwell. When the two men saw one another they both began firing.

One of Desmond's shots hit Caldwell in the shoulder, whereas Caldwell missed with every shot. When both had emptied their pistols, Caldwell ran to Desmond and again hit him over the head with his pistol. Marshal Jameson arrived shortly thereafter and took both men into custody. Two bystanders, George Wilson and Frank Howard, had been wounded by stray bullets. Charges were never filed against Caldwell, and charges against Desmond were later dismissed.

On January 2, 1884, Desmond's livery stable caught fire. Thirteen horses died in the fire, including a prized stallion. Desmond opted to not return to the livery business, and instead opened a saloon, called Star. His detective agency languished, and eventually died out. He served again as a deputy sheriff, and as a constable, thus remaining in law enforcement. By 1885 he had remarried, to a woman named Eva, and although he continued to find himself involved in numerous bar brawls, the couple seemingly had a solid marriage.

On December 19, 1888, Desmond became involved in an argument with a man named Frank Owenby, who owed Desmond money. The incident took place inside the A.C. Daniel's Drug Store, and the pharmacist present that day became concerned that it would become violent, and called the local police by way of police whistle. Jack O'Connor, the officer with whom Desmond had been involved in a gunfight six years prior, responded along with two other officers, Johnny Burke and Danny O'Kelly. The officers were able to calm the situation, and Desmond left.

However, half an hour later Desmond returned, obviously believing that Owenby would no longer be there, and in the company of his wife Eva. The two again argued, and Desmond advanced toward Owenby, unarmed except for a walking cane. Owenby drew a .38 caliber pistol and shot Desmond twice, wounding him, with Eva Desmond immediately jumping between the two men causing Owenby to stop shooting. Officers Caldwell and O'Kelly responded, arresting Owenby and calling for medical assistance for Desmond. Desmond recovered, and eventually the charges against Owenby were dropped short of a fine. Owenby would later brag of the shooting, and would eventually claim that he had killed Desmond that day, omitting the fact that Desmond was not only unarmed, but in fact did not die at all.

In the summer of 1889, Desmond and his wife Eva had moved to Ogden, Utah, opening the Ogden River Resort. There, on the night of July 18, 1889, Desmond and Jack Williams, both drunk, became involved in an argument. Williams was much younger than Desmond, and quickly began getting the best of him during a fist fight. Seeing this, Eva Desmond ran forward and thrust a pistol into Desmond's hand. Desmond pushed the pistol into Williams' chest, but as he fired someone grabbed his arm causing the shot to go high, creasing Williams in the head. Patrons wrestled the pistol from Desmond, but he and Williams continued to fight. Eventually Desmond collapsed from fatigue, and the affair ended. No charges were ever filed against either man.

Closing the resort, again the couple moved, but later returned to Ogden. By that time, a feud over money owed to him by former employee Tom Todd had gotten out of control. Todd had a reputation also as a brawler, and had spent time in jail in Pueblo for shooting and wounding businessman Bert Reynolds. Desmond and Todd became involved in an argument over the affair one night inside the Bear Saloon, and Desmond drew his pistol. However, Todd was unarmed, and the saloon owner, Gus Vogus, was an old friend to Desmond and was able to calm the situation and allow Todd to leave.

On the night of February 28, 1890, Desmond met Todd and another man, Tom O'Neil, inside the Little King Saloon. The three men had drinks, and seemingly by later accounts seemed to be getting along fine. They left, moving down the street to the Capital Saloon, where they continued drinking. Shortly after their arrival, Todd saw bartender W.P. Collier secretly pass something to Desmond, which Desmond then placed into his pocket. Desmond then, in an obvious attempt to goad Todd into a fight, removed a handkerchief and some white gloves from Todd's coat pocket. Todd demanded the property back, and versions conflict as to what exactly happened next. Todd claimed Desmond pulled a pistol, but witnesses said that never happened.

Witness and musician E.T. Roach stated that shots rang out, and he saw Desmond holding his shoulder, at which point more shots sounded. Desmond fell over onto the floor, at which point Todd leisurely strode over and shot more shots into Desmond's prone body. A gun was found on Desmond's person, in his pocket, but in his hand he held only a cigar. Todd was arrested and charged with murder, yet he claimed self defense. Desmond's wife Eva returned her husband's body to Pueblo, where he was buried. His estate was worth $75,000 at the time of his death, leaving his widow and children financially secure. Tom Todd was convicted of manslaughter, and sentenced to five years in prison. After his release, he shot and killed another man in Arapahoe County, Colorado, and was sentenced to eight years in prison. He escaped from jail, and disappeared.
