= Thomas J. Smith (lawman) =

American professional boxer and lawman

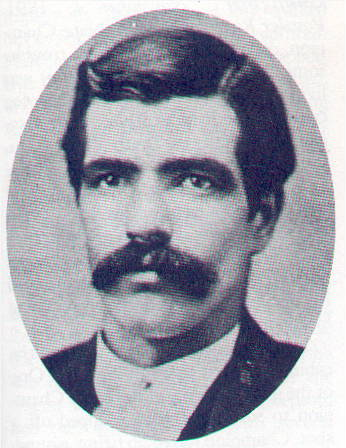
- Born: June 12, 1830; New York City, US
- Died: November 2, 1870 (aged 40); Abilene, Kansas, US
- Occupations: Boxer, railroad worker, lawman
- Years active: 1865–1870

Thomas James Smith, also known as Tom "Bear River" Smith, (June 12, 1830 – November 2, 1870) was a lawman in the American Old West and briefly marshal of cattle town Abilene, Kansas. He was killed and nearly decapitated in the line of duty.

== Early life ==
Little is known of Smith's youth, though he was well known as a tough man and had been a professional middleweight boxer. Originally from New York, he first prospected in Montana, Wyoming and Utah with partner John Conkie. Smith served as a lawman in a few small towns in Wyoming, including Bear River City, as well as in Kit Carson, Colorado, prior to his move to Kansas.

Smith received the nickname "Bear River" due to being the leader of the Bear River Riot in 1867. A vigilante group had lynched a railroad employee who was suspected of murder. Soon afterward, railroad employees retaliated against the vigilantes, resulting in most of the small town of Bear River City, Wyoming, being burned to the ground, and a shootout between town citizens and mob members erupted. Soon, troops from Fort Bridger arrived and imposed martial law. Bear River City soon became deserted, another railroad ghost town.

Smith has been described as having been a handsome man with a thick mustache and an almost fearless nature. There are a number of examples of Smith refusing to back down, despite whatever odds might be against him.

== Marshal of Abilene ==
Prior to Smith's appointment as Abilene marshal, two St. Louis, Missouri, policemen had been hired. The town of Abilene was, at the time, a wild cattle town, and the crime rate had increased almost overnight, beginning in 1867, to the point where murder and shootings were commonplace. The town had numerous saloons and brothels, and up until that point a police force was all but nonexistent. The two St. Louis lawmen resigned before their first day of service was complete. The mayor of Abilene, Theodore Henry, sent for Smith in late 1869, who came highly recommended due to a reputation he had built while working alongside lawman Pat Desmond in Kit Carson, Colorado.

Smith was also commissioned as a deputy US marshal, and was insistent that he could police Abilene using his hands rather than using guns. For a time, he was somewhat successful, although he was forced to use guns in the course of his duty on a few occasions. On one occasion, shortly after taking office, Smith singlehandedly overpowered two men known for their bad temperament, "Big Hank" Hawkins and his partner, known only as "Wyoming Frank". Smith banished them both from Abilene, after beating them both at the same time using only his bare hands. However, being the marshal of a town like Abilene at that time proved to be a dangerous job to have. He implemented a law of "no guns in town limits", which was extremely unpopular with many of the cowboys that drifted through town, and over the next two months Smith survived two assassination attempts. Several other incidents and arrests led him to develop a solid reputation, and he became widely respected and admired by the Abilene citizens.

On November 2, 1870, Smith and a temporary deputy, believed to be named James McDonald, attempted to serve a warrant on two local farmers, Andrew McConnell and Moses Miles. The two men were wanted in connection with the murder of another Abilene man, John Shea. McDonald and Smith located the suspects in a small settlement ten miles outside of Abilene. A gunfight erupted, in which Smith was badly wounded in the chest. Smith returned fire and wounded McConnell. His deputy fled the scene, and as Smith lay wounded, Moses Miles hit him with the butt of a rifle, then took an axe and decapitated him.

McConnell and Miles were captured and arrested in March 1871, Andrew McConnell got 12 years in prison and Moses Miles got 16 years in prison. Smith was buried in Abilene, and a huge tombstone was erected with a plaque to honor his service and ultimate sacrifice. Smith was replaced as marshal by legendary lawman and gunfighter "Wild Bill" Hickok. Dwight Eisenhower reportedly considered Smith a personal hero, and is reported to have visited Smith's gravesite on numerous occasions.

== In media ==
Trail Town by Ernest Haycox was a loose fictionalization of Smith's time as Abilene's marshal. Smith's fictional counterpart was "Dan Mitchell." Abilene became "River Bend." A film version, Abilene Town, starred Randolph Scott as Mitchell. The town's real name was restored for the film.

Tom Smith was featured in Season 1, Episode 7 of the TV series American Lawman titled "Tom Smith: The Two-Fisted Marshal of Abilene"

He was portrayed by Ronald Reagan in a Death Valley Days episode entitled "Marshall 'Bear River' Smith."

Police appointments
Preceded by New office	City Marshal of Abilene, Kansas; June 4, 1870–November 2, 1870	Succeeded by James B. "Wild Bill" Hickok
