= Abilene and Smoky Valley Railroad =

Heritage railway in Kansas, United States

Coordinates: 38°54′39″N 97°12′44″W

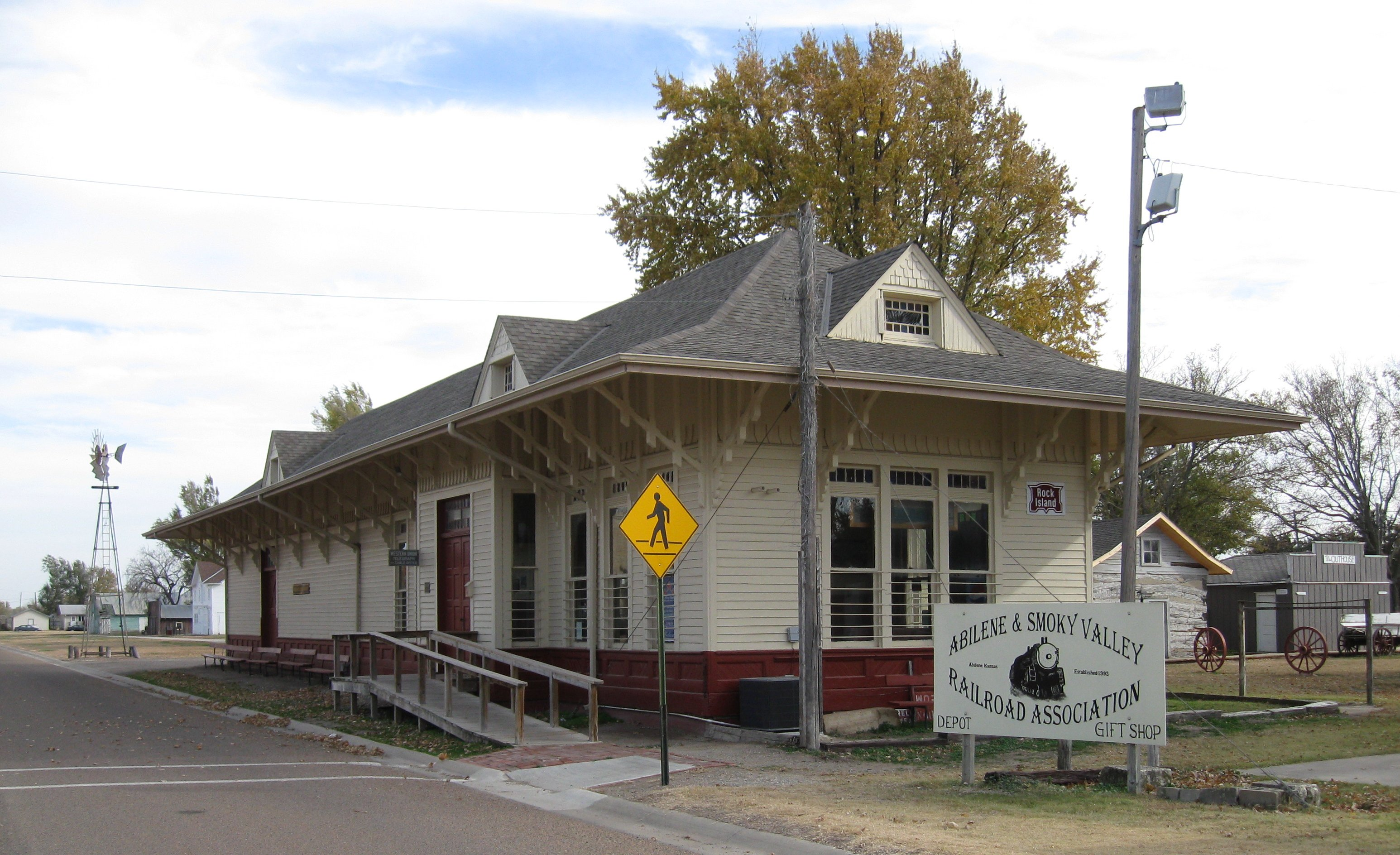
- The ASV Rock Island depot on November 9, 2010

Overview
- Headquarters: Abilene, Kansas
- Reporting mark: ASV
- Dates of operation: 1993–present
- Predecessor: Chicago, Rock Island and Pacific Railroad

Technical
- Track gauge: 4 ft 8 1/2 in (1,435 mm) standard gauge
- Length: 18 miles (29 km)

Other
- Website: www.asvrr.org

The Abilene and Smoky Valley Railroad (reporting mark ASV) is a non-profit heritage railway, located in Abilene, Kansas, United States. The ASV is an experiential learning museum, where tourists ride on a train of vintage railcars while narrators tell the story of how railroads built Kansas’ agribusiness-oriented economy. Passengers are allowed to tour antique passenger cars and talk with staff members about their roles in making the trains operate.

== History ==
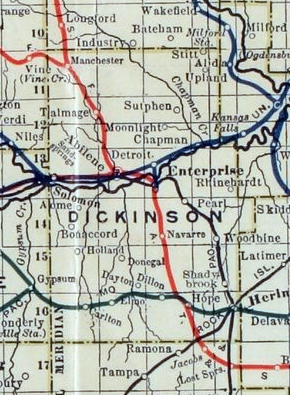
1915 Railroad Map of Dickinson County

The Abilene and Smoky Valley Railroad was founded in 1993 to preserve the legacy of the railroad industry in Kansas and was designated as Kansas’ official heritage railroad in 2024 by an act of the state legislature. The Abilene and Smoky Valley Railroad operates on rails that were initially laid by Chicago, Rock Island and Pacific Railroad in 1886. The 49-mile line, originally known as the Herington-Salina subdivision, was built to connect the Rock Island’s main line with the grain elevators and flour mills in Salina, Kansas.

The ASV's Flint Hills Express excursion train runs from April through September. Special trains run during the Halloween and Christmas seasons. The Smoky Valley Limited dinner train offers some of Kansas' best home cooking, with trains running weekly during the summer and early fall. The Meadowlark Flyer is a special school charter for elementary schools in the region. Additionally, the railroad offers private charters for class reunions, family reunions, birthdays, anniversaries, company parties and other special events.

The railroad is home to two National Historic Register treasures: Abilene’s 1887 Rock Island Depot and ATSF 3415, a 1919 4-6-2 "Pacific" type steam locomotive. The depot is located in Old Abilene Town, south of the Dwight D. Eisenhower Presidential Library and Museum. Santa Fe 3415 is the only operational steam locomotive in Kansas and was restored on November 11, 2008, making its first run on May 23, 2009, after having sat as an inanimate park exhibit for nearly 40 years. In 2024, the Kansas Legislature designated ATSF 3415 as the state’s official steam locomotive.

The railroad also uses vintage diesel engines to power its trains. A 1945 ALCO S-1 was donated to the ASV in 1993, and a newly restored 1940 General Electric 44-tonner center cab engine acquired in 1995 and recently restored as a tribute to President Eisenhower, whose Presidential library and museum are next door to the Abilene Depot. “Ike”, as the locomotive is named and now numbered ASV 34 to commemorate his Presidency. ASV34 was the sixth in its class to be built, and began its career at the Arkansas Valley Interurban Railway in 1940 at Wichita, Kansas, until 1942, when the AVIR went out of business. The engine then served in San Bernardino, California, in the U.S. Army and Air Force, and was eventually acquired by the Ideal Cement Company of Superior, Nebraska, before it was taken to Abilene in 1995. It remains powered by its original Caterpillar D-17000 diesel motors. In 2024, the engine was re-wheeled, received new batteries and brakes, and a Rock Island Railroad maroon and yellow paint scheme before it was dedicated on D-Day 2025.

The ASV operates on 5.5 miles (8.9 km) of track between Abilene and the neighboring Dickinson County community of Enterprise, where trains stop at a replica 1800s milling operation, the Hoffman Mill and General Store. Using vintage milling equipment, the facility grinds locally grown grain into a variety of flour products, as well as corn meal and grits, that are packaged and sold in the mill’s gift shop. During the Enterprise layover, passengers are also allowed to explore the caboose and locomotive.

== Locomotives ==
Locomotive details
Number	Image	Type	Model	Built	Builder	Status
3415		Steam	4-6-2	1919	Baldwin Locomotive Works	Undergoing 1,472-day inspection and overhaul
4		Diesel	S-1	1945	American Locomotive Company	Operational
5		Diesel	45-ton switcher	1943	Whitcomb Company	Operational
6		Diesel	S-4	1953	American Locomotive Company	Out of service
34		Diesel	44-ton switcher	1940	General Electric	Operational

== See also ==
- List of heritage railways
- List of Kansas railroads
