= C. L. Brown =

American businessman

Cleyson Leroy Brown (February 3, 1872 – November 12, 1935) was a telephone company co-founder, financier, innovator, and philanthropist in the United States. He founded Brown Telephone Company, which then became the Sprint Corporation.

Brown, whose name was often abbreviated to C. L. Brown, was a welfare capitalist and benefactor of the community of Abilene, Kansas. A pioneer in Kansas electrification and telephony, Brown consolidated and expanded many early telephone systems, power generation plants, and electrical distribution systems in Kansas and other states. One of his legacy companies, United Telecommunications, merged with Southern Pacific Communications to form Sprint Corporation. Parts of his social legacy endure two miles south of Abilene in the Brown Memorial Home for the Aged and in Camp Brown, the Coronado Area Council scout camp at Abilene. Brown's mill/power dam on Turkey Creek is still a cornerstone of the adjoining Brown Memorial Park.

== Early life ==
Brown's father, Jacob Brown was a grist mill owner. Brown lost his arm when he was ten in a mill accident. He had worked as a teacher and also managed a creamery in Wichita. Brown first built a local electric company, Abilene Electric Light Works to generate electricity from the Smoky Hill River.

== Entrepreneurship and philanthropy ==
Cleyson Brown founded the Brown Telephone Company in 1899 in Abilene, Kansas with his brother Jacob Brown. The local request to start a phone company to challenge the local Bell Telephone company was only five years after the Bell Telephone patents had expired. It is lately known as Sprint.

== Other ventures ==
Brown then ventured into shoe stores, grocery stores, gravel and sand company, hotels, news service, and broadcast station, insurance companies and oil concerns creating an empire.

He also formed the Brown Memorial Foundation (1926) in memory of his parents. A park in around 200 acres was built for the public for free, which included an amusement park with a lake, zoo, golf course, tennis courts, and other attractions.
