= Joseph McCoy =

American cattleman (1837–1915)

Joseph Geiting McCoy
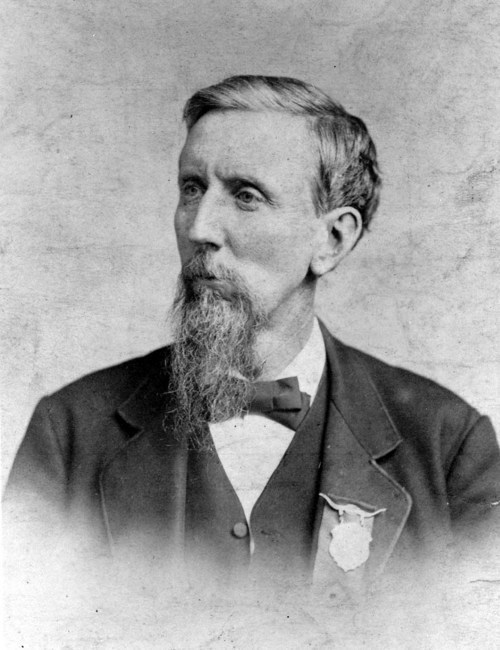
- Joseph McCoy in 1880
- Born: December 21, 1837; Sangamon County, Illinois, US
- Died: October 19, 1915 (aged 77); Kansas City, Missouri, US
- Notable work: Historic Sketches of the Cattle Trade of the West and Southwest
- Spouse: Sarah Epler
- Parent(s): David and Mary (née Kirkpatrick) McCoy

Joseph "Cowboy" McCoy (December 21, 1837 – October 19, 1915) was a 19th-century entrepreneur known for promoting the transport of Longhorn cattle from Texas to the eastern United States.

== Early life ==
Joseph Getting McCoy was one of eleven children born to Mary (née Kirkpatrick) and David McCoy. He was born on 21 December 1837 in Sangamon County, Illinois. The McCoy family made a living off of farming. Joseph went to school, including one year at Knox College. He went into business as a stockman, breeding and selling mules. A big financial break came for McCoy in 1861 when he sold a stockcar-load of mules in Kentucky. Delivery requiring transport over five different rail lines, the experience was also an important lesson in rail logistics that would serve him in his major career venture six years later. The venture sufficiently established him that he was able to propose to Sarah Epler, a neighbor. The earnings from the Kentucky sale allowed McCoy to expand both the diversity and the national reach of his livestock dealings.

== Transporting cattle ==
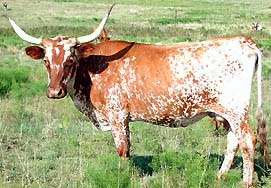
A Texas Longhorn

In the 1860s, cattle ranchers in Texas faced difficulties getting their longhorn cattle to market. Kansas homesteaders objected to the cattle crossing their land because the cattle might carry ticks which could spread a disease called Texas Fever (or Spanish Fever) fatal to some types of cattle. The disease could make a Longhorn sick, but they were hardier stock than the northern cattle and Longhorns seldom died from the disease. McCoy himself said of the disease:

In 1868 a great number of cattle arrived in Kansas and the mid-west from Texas; appx. 40,000. With them came a tick born disease called "Spanish Fever". The local shorthorn breeds were seriously affected and in some towns the loss of the cattle was almost 100%. The result was a great predice against Texas cattle in Eastern Kansas and Missouri.

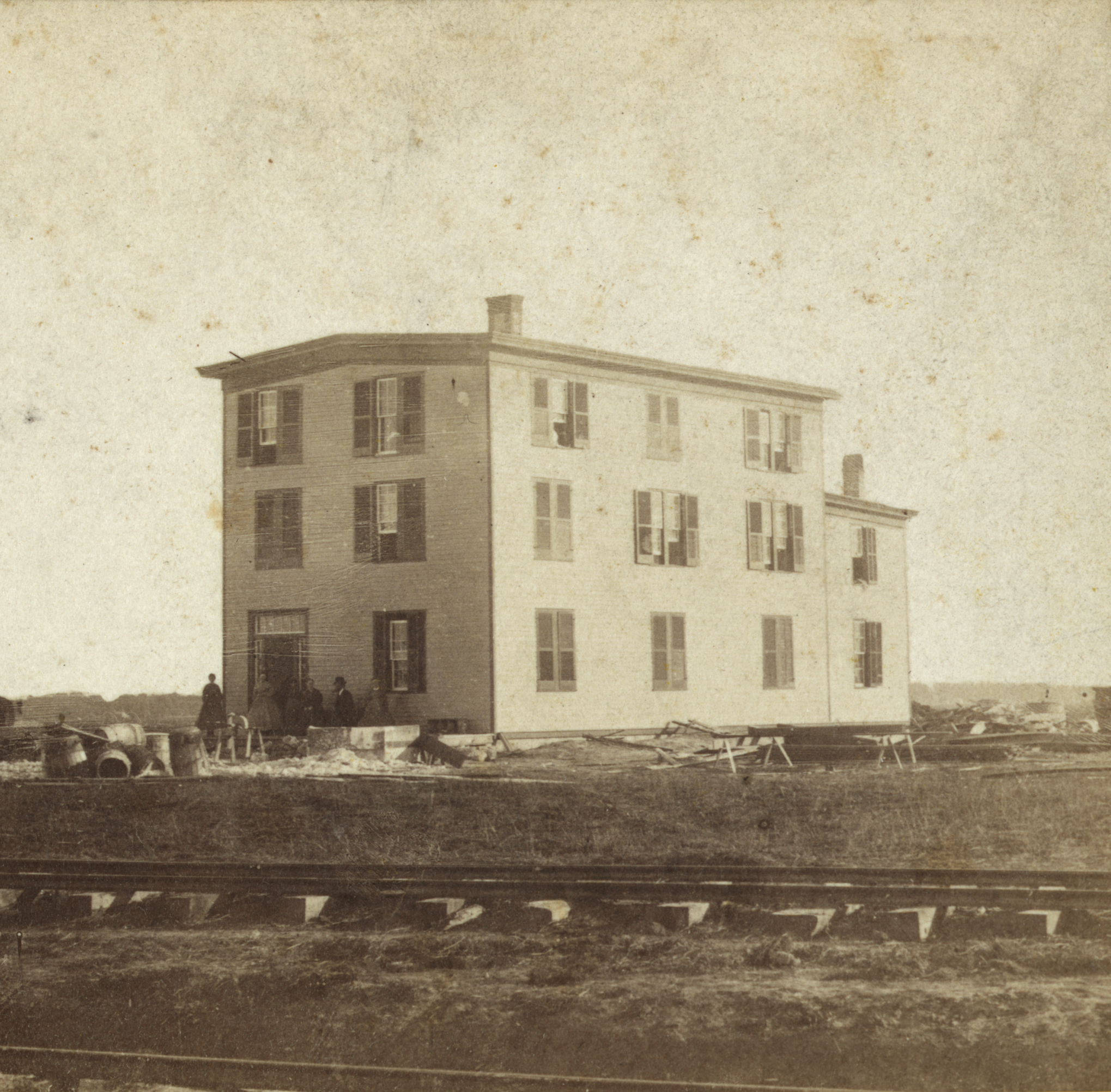
Joseph McCoy's Drover's Hotel, McCoy's Stock Yard, Abilene, Kansas, 1867

McCoy expected that the railroads companies were interested in expanding their freight operations and he saw this as a good business opportunity. McCoy built a hotel, stockyard, office and bank in a little village along the Kansas Pacific Railway (currently the Union Pacific). This village became known as Abilene, Kansas - one of the first cow towns. McCoy's plan was for cattle to be driven to Abilene from Texas and taken from there by rail to bigger cities in The Midwest and the East.

Abilene sat near the end of the Chisholm Trail (named after Jesse Chisholm) established during the American Civil War for supplying the Confederate army. This trail ran to the west of the settled portion of Kansas, making it possible to use the trail without creating hostility from the Kansas homesteaders.

McCoy advertised extensively throughout Texas to encourage cattle owners to drive their cattle to market in Abilene. By 1870 thousands of Texas longhorn cattle were being driven over the Chisholm Trail to the shipping center at Abilene. By 1871 as many as 5,000 cowboys were being paid off during a single day, and Abilene became known as a rough town in the Old West. Due to their long legs and hard hoofs, Longhorns were ideal trail cattle, even gaining weight on their way to market.

== Later life ==
McCoy was also the author of Historic Sketches of the Cattle Trade of the West and Southwest, which was published in 1874.

Joseph McCoy died in Kansas City, Missouri on October 19, 1915.

In 1967, he was inducted into the Hall of Great Westerners of the National Cowboy & Western Heritage Museum.

== Family and descendants ==
Joseph G. McCoy married Sarah Epler in 1861. The couple had 7 children, Owen McCoy (1863–1865), Troy W. McCoy (1865–1865), Mary Epler McCoy (1871–1957), David Bunn McCoy (1869–1949), Florence L. McCoy (1871–1957), Eugene Moncure McCoy (1874–1894) and Ada McCoy (1878–1879). Troy died few months after being born, Ada died 2 months before being 1 year old and Owen died 3 months before being 2 years old.

None of Joseph's recorded living descendants have the surname "McCoy". As of 2025, Joseph G. McCoy has 17 known living descendants, including an adopted great-great-great-grandson, born in Venezuela and now a United States citizen. More than 17descendants are known to exist, but public information about them is not available.

== Bibliography ==
- Hoy, Jim (2006). "Joseph G. McCoy and the Creation of the Mythic American West". In Dean, Virgil W. (ed.). John Brown to Bob Dole: Movers and Shakers in Kansas History. Lawrence, Kans.: University Press of Kansas. pp. 71–80. ISBN 0-7006-1429-X. OCLC 61278474.
- Knowlton, Christopher (2017). Cattle Kingdom: The Hidden History of the Cowboy West. New York: Houghton Mifflin Harcourt. ISBN 978-0-544-36996-2.
- McCoy, Joseph G. (1874). Historic Sketches of the Cattle Trade of the West and Southwest. Kansas City, Mo.: Ramsey, Millett & Hudson.
