= Abilene, Kansas =

City in Dickinson County, Kansas

- City and County seat
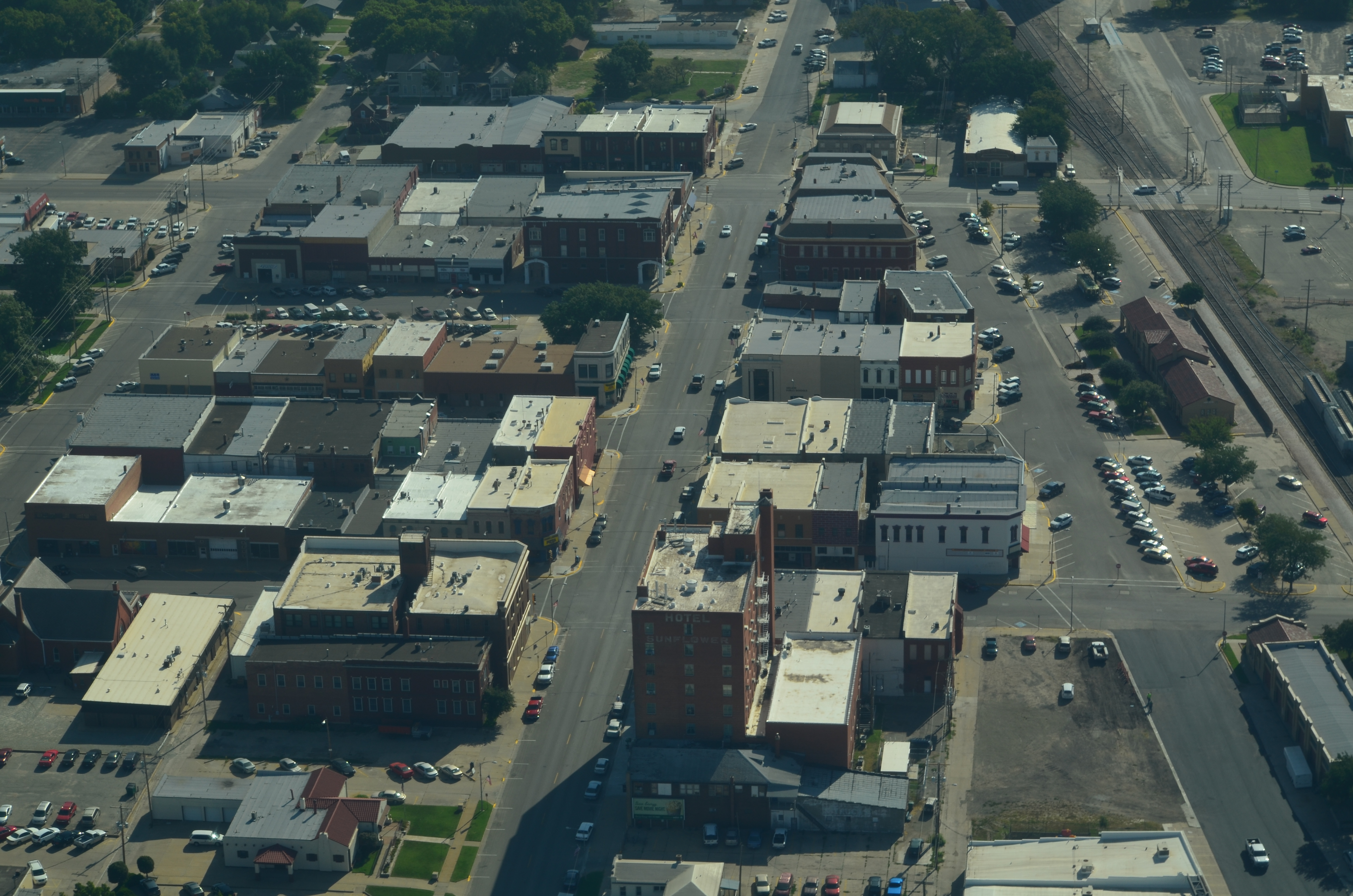
- Aerial view of Abilene (2013)

- Location within Dickinson County and Kansas

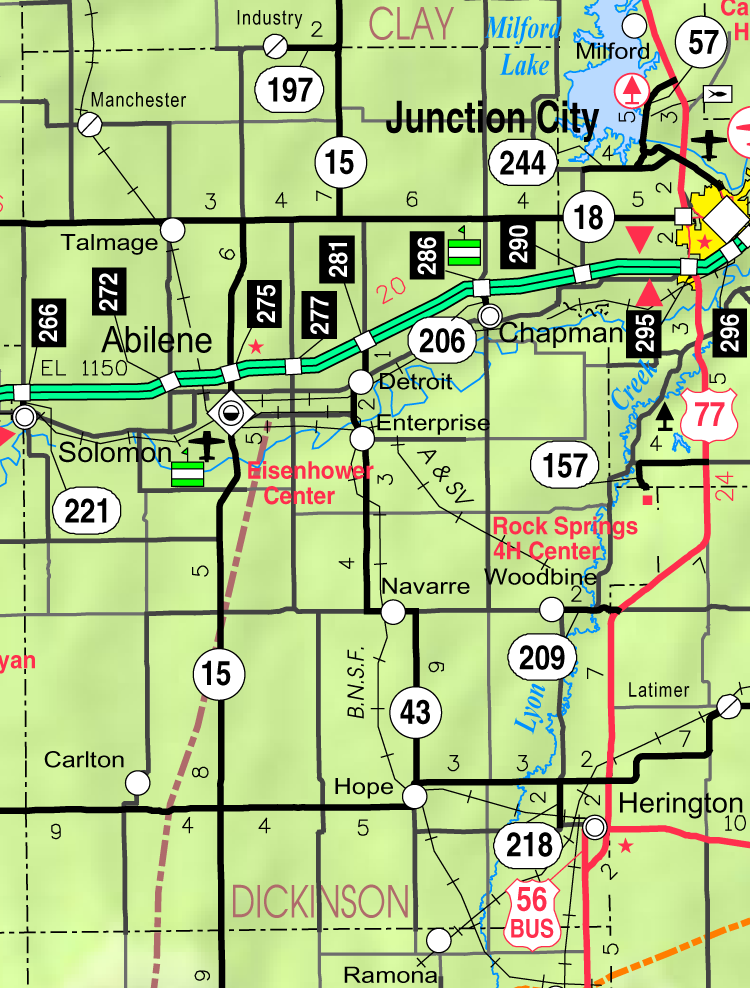
- KDOT map of Dickinson County (legend)
- Coordinates: 38°55′23″N 97°13′31″W
- Country: United States
- State: Kansas
- County: Dickinson
- Founded: 1857; 169 years ago
- Incorporated: 1869
- Named for: Luke 3:1 (Bible)

Government
  - Type: Mayor–Council
  - Mayor: Brandon L. Rein

Area
  - Total: 4.76 sq mi (12.34 km^{2})
  - Land: 4.76 sq mi (12.33 km^{2})
  - Water: 0.0039 sq mi (0.01 km^{2})
- Elevation: 1,145 ft (349 m)

Population (2020)
  - Total: 6,460
  - Density: 1,360/sq mi (524/km^{2})
- Time zone: UTC-6 (CST)
  - Summer (DST): UTC-5 (CDT)
- ZIP Code: 67410
- Area code: 785
- FIPS code: 20-00125
- GNIS ID: 485539
- Website: abilenecityhall.com

Abilene (pronounced /ˈæbɪliːn/) is a city and county seat of Dickinson County, Kansas, United States. As of the 2020 census, the population of the city was 6,460. It is home of the Dwight D. Eisenhower Presidential Library and the Greyhound Hall of Fame.

== History ==
=== 19th century ===
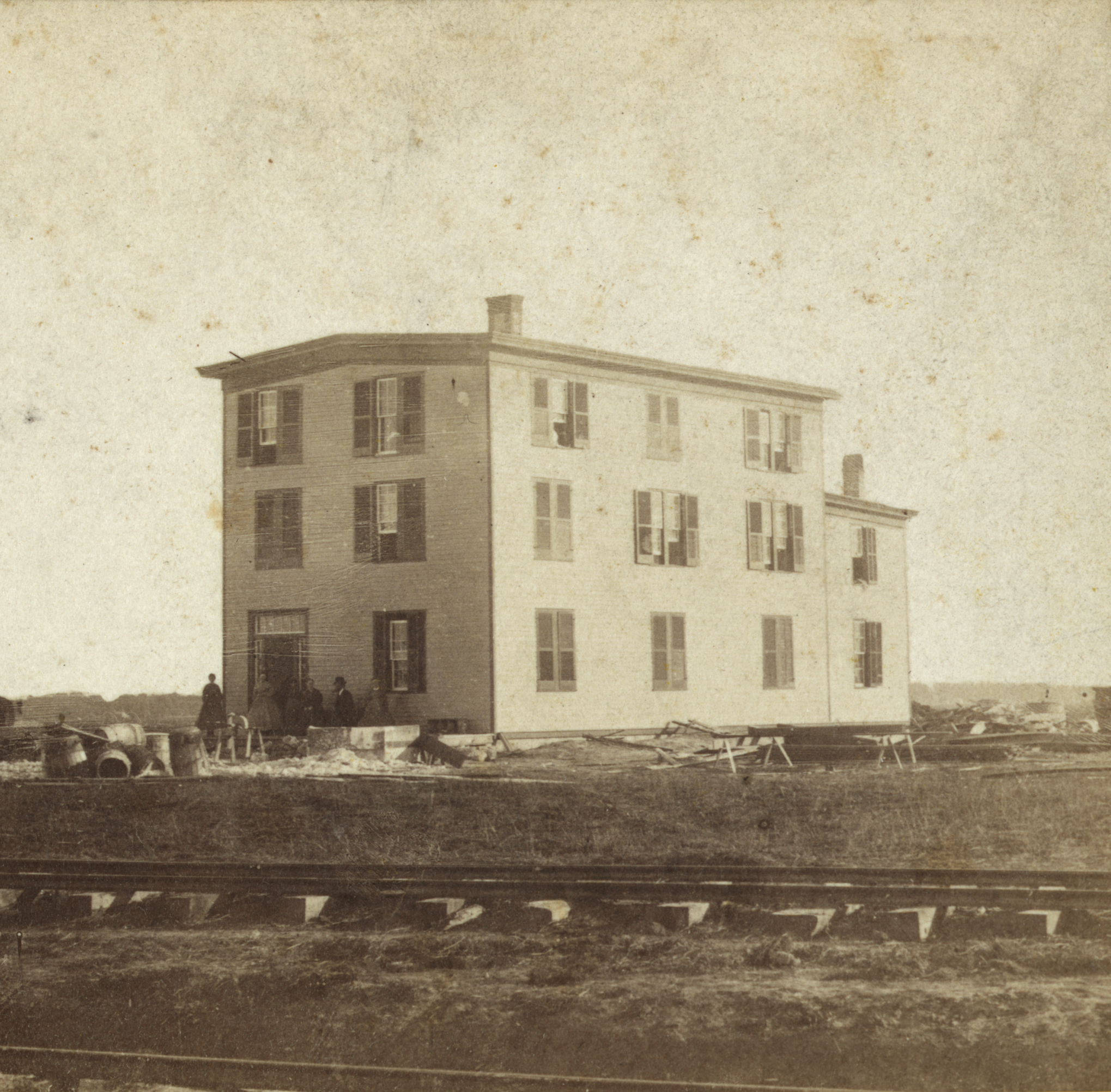
Joseph McCoy's Drover's Hotel, McCoy's Stock Yard in 1867

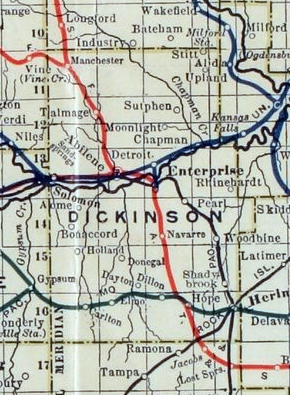
1915 railroad map of Dickinson County

In 1803, most of modern Kansas was secured by the United States as part of the Louisiana Purchase. In 1854, the Kansas Territory was organized, and in 1861 Kansas became the 34th U.S. state.

In 1857, Dickinson County was founded and Abilene began as a stage coach stop, established by Timothy Hersey and named Mud Creek. It was not until 1860 that it was named Abilene, from a passage in the Bible (Luke 3:1), meaning "grassy plains".

In 1867, the Kansas Pacific Railway (Union Pacific) pushed westward through Abilene. In the same year, Joseph G. McCoy purchased 250 acres of land north and east of Abilene, on which he built a hotel, the Drover's Cottage, stockyards equipped for 2,000 head of cattle, and a stable for their horses. The Kansas Pacific put in a spur line at Abilene that enabled the cattle cars to be loaded and sent on to their destinations. The first twenty carloads left September 5, 1867, en route to Chicago, Illinois, where McCoy was familiar with the market. The town grew quickly and became the first "cow town" of the west.

McCoy encouraged Texas cattlemen to drive their herds to his stockyards. From 1867 to 1871, the Chisholm Trail ended in Abilene, bringing in many travelers and making Abilene one of the wildest towns in the west. The stockyards shipped 35,000 head in 1867 and became the largest stockyards west of Kansas City, Kansas. In 1871, more than 5,000 cowboys herded from 600,000 to 700,000 cows to Abilene and other Kansas railheads. Another source reports 440,200 head of cattle were shipped out of Abilene from 1867 to 1871. As railroads were built further south, the end of the Chisholm Trail was slowly moved south toward Caldwell, while Kansas homesteaders concerned with cattle ruining their farm crops moved the trail west toward and past Ellsworth.

Town marshal Tom "Bear River" Smith was initially successful policing Abilene, often using only his bare hands. He survived two assassination attempts, but was murdered and decapitated on November 2, 1870. Smith wounded one of his two attackers during the shootout preceding his death, and both suspects received life in prison for the offense. He was replaced as marshal by Wild Bill Hickok in April 1871. Hickok's time in the job was short. While the marshal was standing off a crowd during a street brawl, gambler Phil Coe took two shots at Hickok, who returned fire, killing Coe, but Hickok then accidentally shot his friend and deputy Mike Williams, who was coming to his aid. Hickok lost his job two months later in December.

In 1880, Conrad Lebold built the Lebold Mansion. Lebold was one of the early town developers and bankers from 1869 through 1889. The Hersey dugout can still be seen in the cellar. The house is now a private residence. A marker outside credits the name of the town being given by opening a Bible and using the first place name pointed to.

In 1887, Atchison, Topeka and Santa Fe Railway built a branch line from Neva (3 miles (4.8 km) west of Strong City) through Abilene to Superior, Nebraska. In 1996, the Atchison, Topeka and Santa Fe Railway merged with Burlington Northern Railroad and renamed to the current BNSF Railway.

In 1890, Dr. A.B. Seelye founded the A.B. Seelye Medical Company. Seelye developed over 100 products for the company including "Wasa-Tusa", an Indian name meaning to heal.

=== 20th century ===
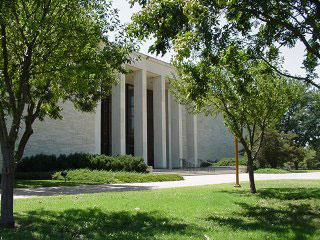
Eisenhower Presidential Library

Abilene became home to Dwight D. Eisenhower when his family moved to Abilene from Denison, Texas in 1892. Eisenhower attended elementary school through high school in Abilene, graduating in 1909. The Dwight D. Eisenhower Presidential Library and Museum is the burial site of President Eisenhower, his wife, Mamie, and their first-born son Doud Dwight.

== Geography ==
Abilene is on the north side of the Smoky Hill River in the Flint Hills region of the Great Plains. Mud Creek, a tributary of the Smoky Hill, flows south through the city. Located in North Central Kansas at the intersection of Interstate 70 and K-15, Abilene is approximately 27 mi (43 km) east of Salina, Kansas, 94 mi (151 km) north of Wichita, and 139 mi (224 km) west of Kansas City.

According to the United States Census Bureau, the city has an area of 4.68 square miles (12.12 km^{2}), all land.

=== Climate ===
Located in the transition zone between North America's humid subtropical climate (Köppen Cfa) and humid continental climate (Köppen Dfa) zones, Abilene experiences hot, humid summers and cold, dry winters. In the spring, severe thunderstorms bring the threat of tornadoes and hail. The hottest temperature recorded in Abilene was 113 °F (45.0 °C) on July 13, 1954, and July 15, 1954, while the coldest temperature recorded was −29 °F (−33.9 °C) on February 12, 1899.

Climate data for Abilene, Kansas, 1991–2020 normals, extremes 1893–present
Month	Jan	Feb	Mar	Apr	May	Jun	Jul	Aug	Sep	Oct	Nov	Dec	Year
Record high °F (°C)	78 (26)	84 (29)	95 (35)	100 (38)	103 (39)	111 (44)	113 (45)	112 (44)	113 (45)	98 (37)	88 (31)	74 (23)	113 (45)
Mean maximum °F (°C)	63.9 (17.7)	71.0 (21.7)	81.0 (27.2)	87.4 (30.8)	93.1 (33.9)	100.7 (38.2)	105.2 (40.7)	102.8 (39.3)	96.9 (36.1)	89.7 (32.1)	75.3 (24.1)	65.7 (18.7)	106.5 (41.4)
Mean daily maximum °F (°C)	43.2 (6.2)	48.6 (9.2)	59.7 (15.4)	69.7 (20.9)	78.9 (26.1)	89.4 (31.9)	94.4 (34.7)	92.1 (33.4)	84.2 (29.0)	71.2 (21.8)	57.1 (13.9)	45.4 (7.4)	69.5 (20.8)
Daily mean °F (°C)	32.5 (0.3)	36.9 (2.7)	47.3 (8.5)	57.2 (14.0)	66.8 (19.3)	77.1 (25.1)	81.9 (27.7)	79.8 (26.6)	71.6 (22.0)	58.8 (14.9)	45.6 (7.6)	35.0 (1.7)	57.5 (14.2)
Mean daily minimum °F (°C)	21.7 (−5.7)	25.2 (−3.8)	34.9 (1.6)	44.7 (7.1)	54.7 (12.6)	64.8 (18.2)	69.4 (20.8)	67.4 (19.7)	58.9 (14.9)	46.4 (8.0)	34.1 (1.2)	24.5 (−4.2)	45.6 (7.5)
Mean minimum °F (°C)	1.6 (−16.9)	6.1 (−14.4)	15.2 (−9.3)	27.5 (−2.5)	38.9 (3.8)	52.1 (11.2)	59.0 (15.0)	56.5 (13.6)	42.5 (5.8)	28.1 (−2.2)	16.7 (−8.5)	6.7 (−14.1)	−2.3 (−19.1)
Record low °F (°C)	−20 (−29)	−29 (−34)	−9 (−23)	9 (−13)	27 (−3)	34 (1)	44 (7)	41 (5)	23 (−5)	16 (−9)	−6 (−21)	−24 (−31)	−29 (−34)
Average precipitation inches (mm)	0.86 (22)	1.43 (36)	2.23 (57)	3.26 (83)	5.20 (132)	4.18 (106)	4.75 (121)	4.27 (108)	2.54 (65)	2.47 (63)	1.59 (40)	1.50 (38)	34.28 (871)
Average snowfall inches (cm)	4.1 (10)	2.8 (7.1)	1.7 (4.3)	0.2 (0.51)	0.0 (0.0)	0.0 (0.0)	0.0 (0.0)	0.0 (0.0)	0.0 (0.0)	0.2 (0.51)	1.0 (2.5)	2.2 (5.6)	12.2 (30.52)
Average precipitation days (≥ 0.01 in)	3.9	4.0	6.6	7.6	10.2	8.2	8.5	8.1	5.9	6.4	4.5	4.3	78.2
Average snowy days (≥ 0.1 in)	2.4	1.4	0.8	0.1	0.0	0.0	0.0	0.0	0.0	0.2	0.6	1.9	7.4
Source 1: NOAA
Source 2: National Weather Service

== Economy ==
Abilene remains a cattle yard town, loading onto the rail system, along with grain and other crops.

There are two Great Plains Manufacturing Land Pride manufacturing facilities in Abilene.

It is the birthplace of Sprint Telecommunications.

== Demographics ==
Historical population
Census	Pop.	Note	%±
1880	2,360		—
1890	3,547		50.3%
1900	3,507		−1.1%
1910	4,118		17.4%
1920	4,895		18.9%
1930	5,658		15.6%
1940	5,671		0.2%
1950	5,775		1.8%
1960	6,746		16.8%
1970	6,661		−1.3%
1980	6,572		−1.3%
1990	6,242		−5.0%
2000	6,543		4.8%
2010	6,844		4.6%
2020	6,460		−5.6%
2023 (est.)	6,443		−0.3%
U.S. Decennial Census; 2010-2020

=== 2020 census ===
As of the 2020 census, there were 6,460 people, 2,797 households, and 1,675 families in Abilene. The population density was 1,356.6 per square mile (523.8/km^{2}). There were 3,137 housing units at an average density of 658.8 per square mile (254.3/km^{2}).

The median age was 42.3 years. 23.1% of residents were under the age of 18, 7.4% were from 18 to 24, 22.3% were from 25 to 44, 24.6% were from 45 to 64, and 22.6% were 65 years of age or older. For every 100 females, there were 93.5 males, and for every 100 females age 18 and over, there were 89.3 males age 18 and over.

98.5% of residents lived in urban areas, while 1.5% lived in rural areas.

There were 2,797 households, of which 26.9% had children under the age of 18 living in them. Of all households, 44.7% were married-couple households, 19.3% were households with a male householder and no spouse or partner present, and 30.0% were households with a female householder and no spouse or partner present. About 35.8% of all households were made up of individuals, and 18.5% had someone living alone who was 65 years of age or older. The average household size was 2.1 and the average family size was 2.9.

There were 3,137 housing units, of which 10.8% were vacant. The homeowner vacancy rate was 3.5% and the rental vacancy rate was 11.6%.

Racial composition as of the 2020 census
Race	Number	Percent
White	5,939	91.9%
Black or African American	56	0.9%
American Indian and Alaska Native	23	0.4%
Asian	22	0.3%
Native Hawaiian and Other Pacific Islander	8	0.1%
Some other race	95	1.5%
Two or more races	317	4.9%
Hispanic or Latino (of any race)	365	5.7%

The non-Hispanic white population was 89.5%.

Educational attainment

The 2016–2020 5-year American Community Survey estimates show that 21.2% of the population had a bachelor's degree or higher.

Income and poverty

The 2016–2020 5-year American Community Survey estimates show that the median household income was $47,829 (with a margin of error of +/- $10,161) and the median family income was $69,815 (+/- $11,480). Males had a median income of $36,933 (+/- $6,402) versus $21,540 (+/- $3,802) for females. The median income for those above 16 years old was $30,625 (+/- $4,869). Approximately, 4.8% of families and 8.3% of the population were below the poverty line, including 9.2% of those under the age of 18 and 8.5% of those ages 65 or over.

=== 2010 census ===
As of the 2010 census, there were 6,844 people, 2,878 households, and 1,781 families residing in the city. The population density was 1,463.6 inhabitants per square mile (565.1/km^{2}). There were 3,143 housing units at an average density of 671.6 per square mile (259.3/km^{2}). The city's racial makeup was 94.9% White, 0.9% African American, 0.4% American Indian, 0.2% Asian, 1.1% from some other race, and 2.4% from two or more races. 4.7% of the population was Hispanic or Latino of any race.

There were 2,878 households, of which 31.1% had children under the age of 18 living with them, 47.3% were married couples living together, 4.0% had a male householder with no wife present, 10.6% had a female householder with no husband present, and 38.1% were non-families. 33.3% of all households were made up of individuals, and 17.2% had someone living alone who was 65 years of age or older. The average household size was 2.33, and the average family size was 2.97.

In the city, the population was spread out, with 25.7% under the age of 18, 6.9% from 18 to 24, 23.7% from 25 to 44, 24.5% from 45 to 64, and 19.2% who were 65 years of age or older. The median age was 39.6 years. For every 100 females, there were 92.3 males. For every 100 females age 18 and over, there were 87.2 males age 18 and over.

The city's median household income was $48,115, and the median family income was $61,146. Males had a median income of $42,332 versus $29,325 for females. The city's per capita income was $21,820. About 7.3% of families and 10.8% of the population were below the poverty line, including 14.1% of those under age 18 and 15.1% of those age 65 or over.

== Education ==
The community is served by Abilene USD 435 public school district.

== Transportation ==
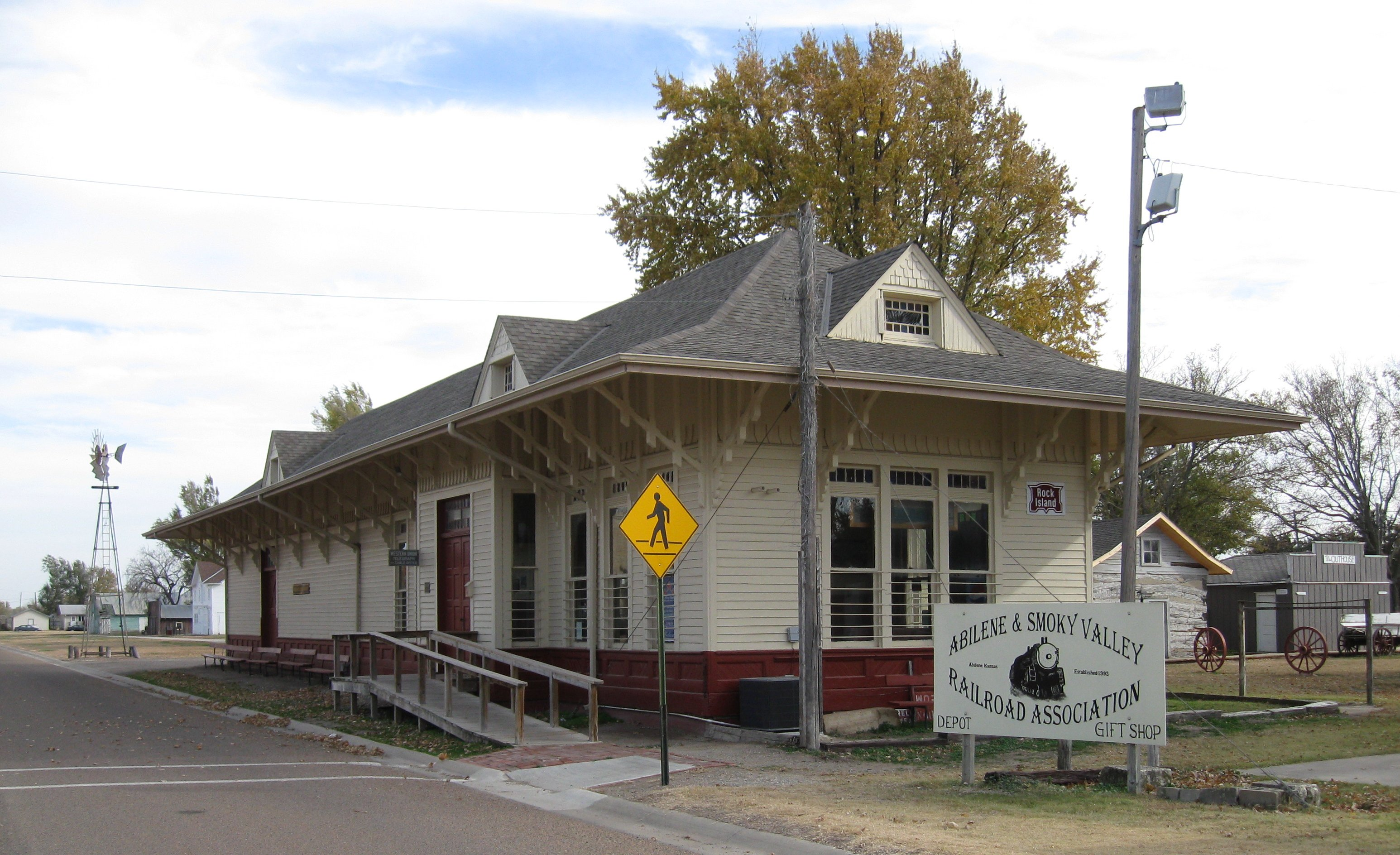
The former Rock Island Depot is a gift shop for the Abilene and Smoky Valley Railroad (2010).

Interstate 70 and U.S. Route 40 run concurrently east–west immediately north of Abilene, intersecting highway K-15, which runs north–south through the city.

Abilene Municipal Airport is on the city's southwestern side. Publicly owned, it has one asphalt runway and is used predominantly for general aviation.

The Kansas Pacific (KP) line of the Union Pacific Railroad runs east–west through the city. It intersects a BNSF Railway line which enters the city from the east and then turns north.

The city of Abilene provided demand responsive transport.

== Media ==
=== Print ===
Abilene has only one daily newspaper, The Abilene Reflector-Chronicle.

=== Radio ===
The following radio stations are licensed to Abilene:

AM

Frequency	Callsign	Format	City of License	Notes
1560	KABI	Adult Standards/MOR	Abilene, Kansas	-

FM

Frequency	Callsign	Format	City of License	Notes
94.1	K231AW	Religious	Abilene, Kansas	AFR; Translator of KAKA, Salina, Kansas
98.5	KSAJ-FM	Oldies	Abilene, Kansas	Broadcasts from Salina, Kansas

=== Television ===
Abilene is in the Wichita-Hutchinson, Kansas television market.

== Points of interest ==
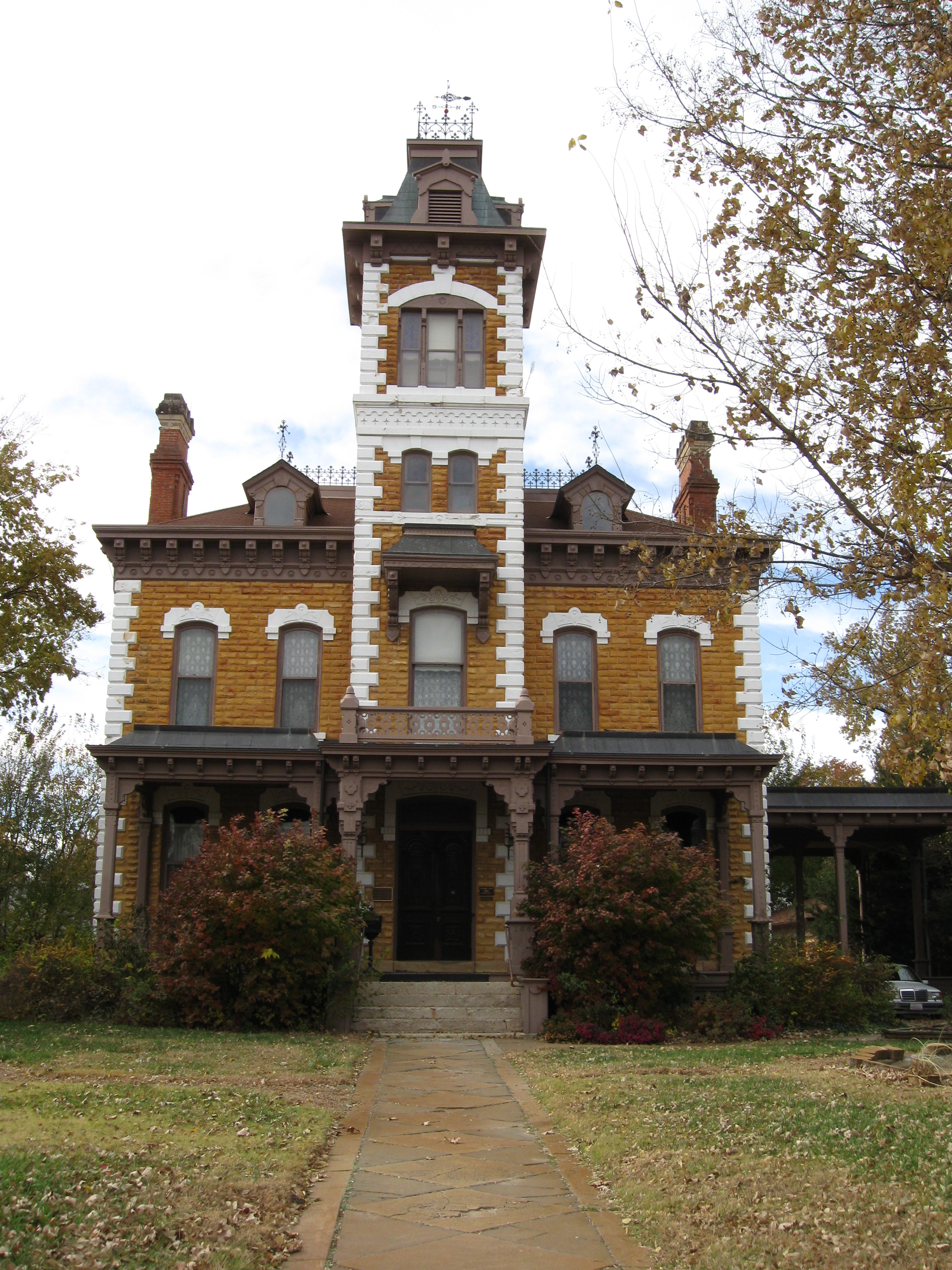
Lebold Mansion

- Abilene and Smoky Valley Railroad - A tourist railroad based out of the old Rock Island train depot in Old Abilene Town; it hauls passengers between Abilene and Enterprise.
- Eisenhower Presidential Center and the Dwight D. Eisenhower Presidential Library and Museum. - Contains murals depicting President Eisenhower's life, painted by artists, Louis George Bouché and Ross Moffett in 1954.
- Great Plains Theatre - Originally First Presbyterian Church, built in 1881, Landmarked, and is now a live professional theatre, and movie theatre.
- Greyhound Hall of Fame - Near the Eisenhower Presidential Library, the hall exhibits the history of the greyhound breed and of greyhound racing.
- Heritage Center of Dickinson County - Two museums including the Historical Museum and the Museum of Independent Telephony. The Museum of Independent Telephony tells the story of C. L. Brown, whose independent Brown Telephone Company grew to become Sprint Corporation and then T-Mobile.
- Lebold Mansion - National Register Property listed in 1973. Built in 1880 in the Italianate Tuscan villa style. This decorative arts museum was once home to one of the finest collections of American Victorian antiques and artifacts. However, the museum closed to all tours in June 2010 and was sold to new owners as a private residence on 9/15/10.
- Old Abilene Town - Constructed as a replica historic district, beginning in the late 1950s, it includes several original buildings that have been moved from their original locations.
- A. B. Seelye House and Museum - A Georgian style mansion built in 1905 at a cost of $55,000. The 25 room mansion contains the original furniture and Edison light fixtures. The Patent Medicine Museum contains many artifacts of the A.B. Seelye Medical Company. Listed on the National Register of Historic Places, it is a museum showcasing Seelye, an advocate of patent medicines.
- Kansas Historical Marker - Historic Abilene, on south Sixth Street.

== Cultural ==
Cowboy-era Abilene is the fictional setting for the Randolph Scott-starring 1946 film Abilene Town, which in turn became the inspiration behind the 1963 hit song "Abilene", recorded by George Hamilton IV.

British singer-songwriter John Cale's song "Buffalo Ballet" from his 1974 album Fear reflects a cynical view of the town's history from the days it was "young and gay" until it "drowned in wealth and pain", as an example of the expansion of the American Frontier.

The main storyline of western video game Call of Juarez: Gunslinger is at Abilene.

The much larger city of Abilene, Texas takes its name from Abilene, Kansas.

== Notable people ==
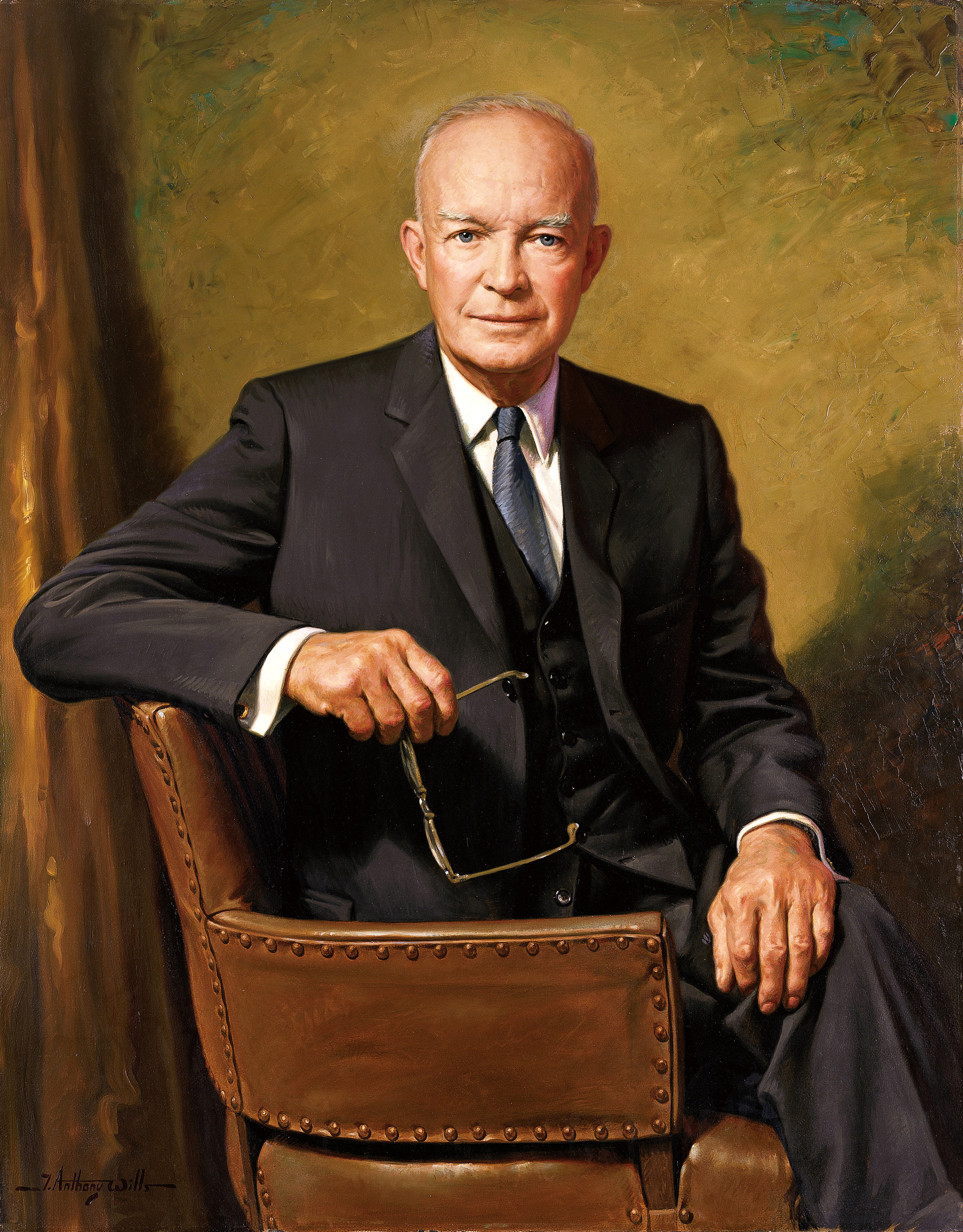
Dwight D. Eisenhower

Old West figures who lived in Abilene during its period as a cowtown included: lawmen City Marshal Wild Bill Hickok and Deputy U.S. Marshal/City Marshal Tom "Bear River" Smith; cattle baron Joseph McCoy; gambler Phil Coe; infamous gunfighters Pat Desmond, John Wesley Hardin and Ben Thompson and Thompson's sister-in-law Libby, a prostitute and dance hall girl. President of the United States and five-star general Dwight D. Eisenhower grew up in Abilene as did his brothers Edgar, Earl, and Milton. Eisenhower is buried in Abilene, along with his wife Mamie and their eldest son Doud, on the grounds of his presidential library.

Other notable individuals who have lived in Abilene include these:

- C. Olin Ball, food scientist, inventor
- Harry Beaumont, Oscar-nominated film director
- Joseph Burton, U.S. Senator from Kansas
- Steve Doocy, journalist, author
- Joe Engle, pilot and NASA Astronaut
- Marlin Fitzwater, former Press Secretary of Presidents Ronald Reagan and George Bush
- Bonnie Leman, founder of Quilter's Newsletter Magazine
- Edward Little, U.S. Representative from Kansas
- Deane Malott, university administrator
- Frank Parent, California court judge
- Mike Racy, commissioner for MIAA, previously vice president for NCAA
- Everett Stewart, World War II flying ace
- Hy Vandenberg, Major League Baseball pitcher
- Cody Whitehair, center for the Chicago Bears and Las Vegas Raiders

== Sister cities ==
- Omitama, Ibaraki, Japan

== See also ==
- National Register of Historic Places listings in Dickinson County, Kansas
- Abilene High School
- Abilene Trail
