= K-43 (Kansas highway) =

State highway in Kansas, U.S.

K-43
- K-43 highlighted in red

Route information
- Maintained by KDOT
- Length: 20.718 mi (33.342 km)
- Existed: c. 1932–present

Major junctions
- South end: K-4 in Hope
- North end: I-70 / US-40 north of Detroit

Location
- Country: United States
- State: Kansas
- Counties: Dickinson

Highway system
- Kansas State Highway System; Interstate; US; State; Spurs
← K-42	→ K-44

K-43 is a 20.718-mile-long (33.342 km) state highway in the U.S. state of Kansas. The highway runs from K-4 in Hope north to Interstate 70 (I-70) and U.S. Route 40 (US-40) north of Detroit. The entire highway is located within Dickinson County. K-43 is maintained by the Kansas Department of Transportation (KDOT), and is a relatively minor highway. K-43 is not part of the National Highway System. The highway was established around 1932, with the northern terminus being the now decommissioned US-40S. In 1962, the route was extended north a bit to a new diamond interchange with I-70.

== Route description ==
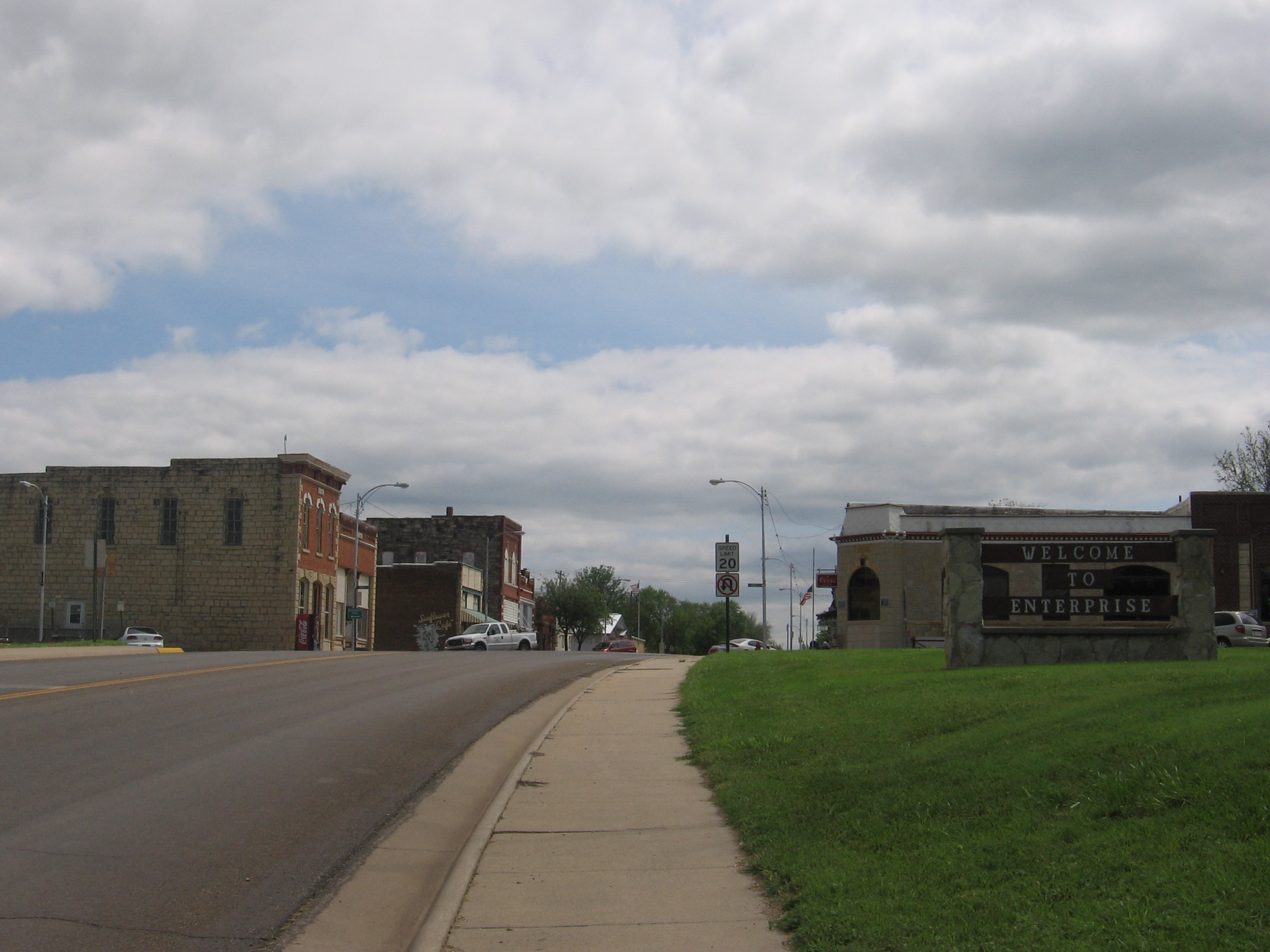
K-43 as it enters Enterprise from the north.

K-43 begins at an intersection with K-4 at the northern city limit of Hope. The highway heads north for about seven miles (11 km) before turning west and entering the small community of Navarre. The route crosses the BNSF Railway and turns to the north, continuing through flat farmland. The highway crosses the railway again before entering the city of Enterprise. In Enterprise, K-43 turns west along 5th Street, then north onto Factory Street. The highway curves northwest and crosses the BNSF Railway a third time before crossing the Smoky Hill River. This river crossing replaces a 160-foot-long (49 m) truss bridge located two blocks to the west on Bridge Street, constructed in 1924, and demolished circa 1987.

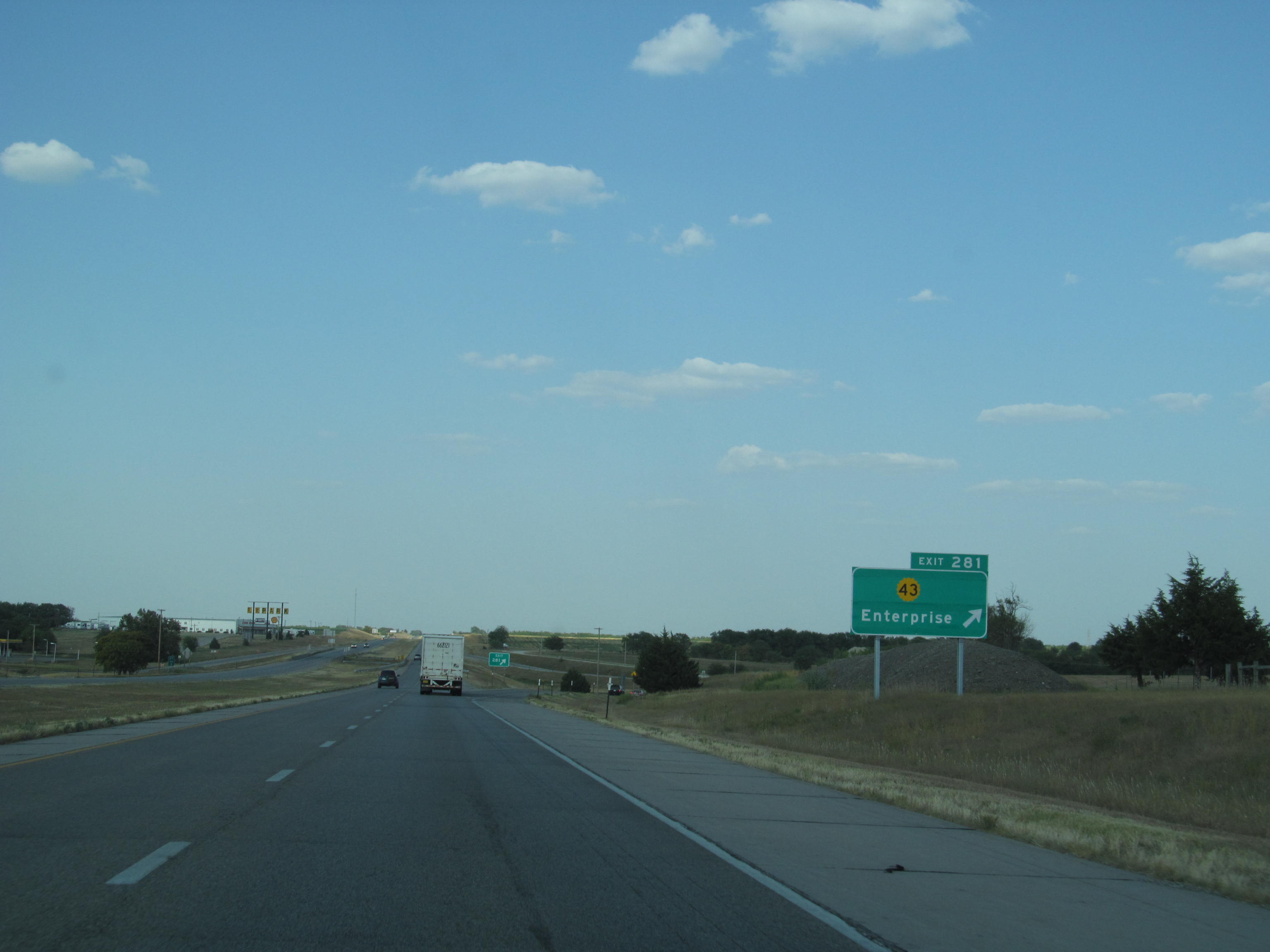
I-70 exit for K-43

Upon crossing this bridge, K-43 leaves Enterprise. The route bends to the north and crosses the BNSF Railway a fourth and final time. Continuing north through level plains, K-43 meets a railroad operated by Union Pacific and comes to an intersection with its former northern terminus at an old alignment of US-40. At this intersection, the route turns to the northeast and travels through the community of Detroit before turning back to the north. North of here, K-43 meets its northern terminus at a diamond interchange with I-70 and US-40.

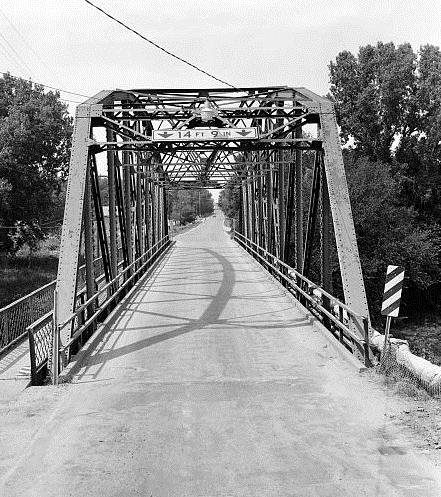
K-43 crossing the Smoky Hill River northbound

All but 1.059 miles (2 km) of K-43's alignment is maintained by the Kansas Department of Transportation (KDOT). The entire section within Enterprise is maintained by the city. The traffic numbers on the route in 2012, measured in annual average daily traffic, were relatively low compared to other state highways. Between 185 and 1900 vehicles traveled the highway each day, including between 30 and 95 trucks. The most traffic was present in the segment of the highway between Enterprise and Detroit. No segment of K-43 is included in the National Highway System, a system of highways considered to be important to the nation's defense, economy, and mobility.

== History ==
K-43 first appears on the 1932 state highway map. At that time it followed largely the same alignment it does today, running from K-4 in Hope to an intersection with what was then US-40S. Most of the road was dirt, but it was paved with gravel from Enterprise north to its northern terminus. By 1936, the whole route had been upgraded to gravel pavement. In 1945, the portion north of Enterprise was paved. The entire highway had been paved by 1956. In 1962, the highway was extended slightly to the north, moving its northern terminus from US-40 to an interchange with the newly constructed I-70. The route has not changed significantly since 1962.

== Major intersections ==
The entire route is in Dickinson County.

Location	mi	km	Destinations	Notes
Hope	0.000	0.000	K-4 (700 Avenue) – Hope, Herington	Southern terminus
Center Township	20.718	33.342	I-70 / US-40 – Topeka, Salina	Northern terminus; I-70 exit 281; diamond interchange; continues north past I-70 / US-40 as Mink Road
1.000 mi = 1.609 km; 1.000 km = 0.621 mi
