= Abilene High School =

Abilene High School may refer to:

- Abilene High School (Kansas), Abilene, Kansas
- Abilene High School (Texas), Abilene, Texas
