= Abilene USD 435 =

Public school district in Abilene, Kansas

Address
- 213 N Broadway St Abilene, Kansas, 67410; United States
- Coordinates: 38°55′1″N 97°12′55″W

District information
- Type: Public
- Grades: K to 12
- Schools: 5

Other information
- Website: abileneschools.org

Abilene USD 435 is a public unified school district headquartered in Abilene, Kansas, United States. The district includes the communities of Abilene, Talmage, and nearby rural areas.

== Schools ==
The school district operates the following schools:

- Abilene High School (9-12)
- Abilene Middle School (6-8)
- Eisenhower Elementary (4-5)
- McKinley Intermediate (2-3)
- Kennedy Primary (PreK-1)

In the fall pupils in high schools may pick cross-country, tennis, volleyball and football as sports activities, in winter basketball and wrestling, in spring they may choose tennis, baseball, softball, golf and track.

In middle schools, football, cross-country and volleyball is available year-round.

== See also ==
- Kansas State Department of Education
- Kansas State High School Activities Association
- List of high schools in Kansas
- List of unified school districts in Kansas
