= Ku Klux Klan raid in Inglewood, California =

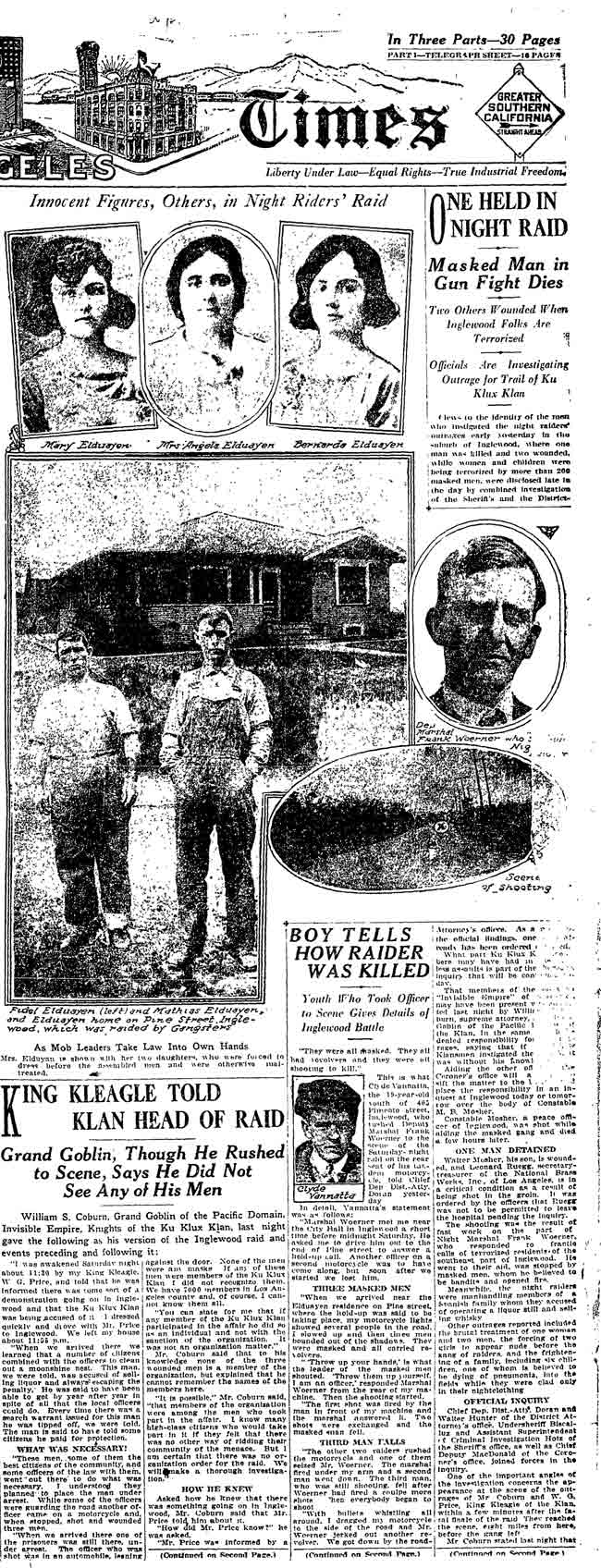
Front page of the Los Angeles Times for Monday, April 24, 1922

Ku Klux Klan activities in Inglewood, California, were highlighted by the 1922 arrest and trial of 36 men, most of them masked, for a night-time raid on a suspected bootlegger and his family. The raid led to the shooting death of one of the culprits, an Inglewood police officer. A jury returned a "not guilty" verdict for all defendants who completed the trial. It was this scandal, according to the Los Angeles Times, that eventually led to a crackdown on the Klan in California. The Klan had a chapter in Inglewood as late as October 1931.

== People involved ==
=== Principals ===
- Fidel and Angela Elduayen, identified contemporaneously as Spanish, although a 1999 report said that they were Basques, and their children, Bernarda, 13, and Mary, 15. They lived on Pine Avenue, Inglewood, with Mathias Elduayen, Fidel's brother.
- Medford B. Mosher, Inglewood city constable, killed by a gunshot.
- Frank Woerner, Inglewood city marshal (also identified as a "traffic cop") the man who killed Mosher and wounded two others.
- Leonard Ruegg, wounded by Woerner.
- Walter Mosher, son of Medford B., also wounded.
- Clyde Vannatta, a 19-year-old volunteer who drove Woerner to the scene of the shooting on the back of his motorcycle.
- Nicholas Neal, a 17-year-old volunteer who drove Woernor to the scene of the hanging and also supplied the rope.

=== Defendants ===
- Nathan A. Baker, Kleagle of the KKK, who collapsed and never completed trial.

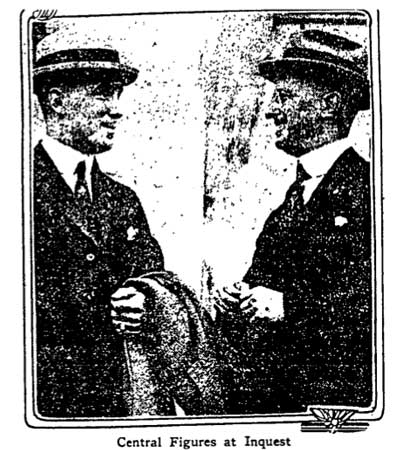
Indicted Klan officials Gus W. Price, left, and William S. Coburn. Los Angeles Times photo, April 26, 1922.

- H.B. Beaver, undertaker, whose chapel was used the night before as a place to plan the raid, where the coroner's inquest was held, and the site of last rites for Medford Mosher.
- William S. Coburn, formerly Grand Goblin of the Klan on the Pacific Coast, who returned from Georgia to face trial.
- Walter E. Mosher, son of M.B. Mosher.
- Gus W. Price, King Kleagle of the KKK in California.
- W.A. Alexander, contractor of Huntington Park.
- R.D. Aylsworth, engineer of Inglewood.
- C.J. Brown, real estate man of Venice.
- L.L. Bryson, druggist of Huntington Park.
- J.G. Baum, real estate man of Inglewood.
- Charles Casto, amusement man of Venice.
- Nathan H. Cherry, surveyor of Inglewood.
- M.D. Hurlburt, dry cleaner of Bell.
- William Hall, transfer man of Inglewood.
- Warren Hall, hauling contractor of Inglewood.
- J.R. Hamilton, machinist of Huntington Park.
- Thomas H. Jennings, auto salesman of Inglewood.
- Frank C. Lemon, cafe man of Bell.
- Gustav Leonhardt, painting contractor of Venice.
- Harvey C. Leavitt, motion picture man of Los Angeles.
- Roy Mears, amusements of Venice.
- H.A. McCallister, real estate man, Inglewood.
- William Mitchell or Michel, repair man of Redondo.
- W.B. Moll, motion pictures of Los Angeles.
- Leonard Ruegg of Inglewood.
- E.J. Robichaux, real estate man of Inglewood.
- Joseph P. Reed, cafe man of Huntington Park.
- E.E. ReId, repair man of Redondo.
- W.D. Record, engineer of Inglewood.
- Earnest M. Schultz of Santa Monica.
- Thomas E. Truelove, poultryman of Inglewood.
- Walter Harrison Ulm, motorman of Inglewood.
- H.A. Waite, garage man of Inglewood.
- E.M. or F.M. Walton, patrolman of Bell.
- M.L. Whaley, auto shop of Venice.
- Russell Williams, motion picture man of Los Angeles.
- James P. Williams, painter of Culver City.

=== In the courtroom and behind the scenes ===
- Paul Barksdale D'Orr, chief counsel for the accused.
- Chief Deputy District Attorney William C. Doran, representing Los Angeles County at the coroner's inquest.
- Raymond I. Eurney, deputy district attorney
- R.W. George, foreman of the grand jury that indicted the defendants.
- Superior Court Judge Frederick W. Houser, in charge of the criminal trial.
- Asa Keyes, deputy district attorney
- John T. Mulligan, attorney for W.B. Coburn.
- Frank D. Parent, member of the coroner's jury and later a Superior Court judge. Others on the coroner's jury were George G. Clarken, foreman; F.J. Maher, Fred U.S. Hughes, J.A. Griffith, and S.S. Lee.
- Clarence J. Reed, foreman of the trial jury.
- Inglewood Motorcycle Officer Blake B. Shambeau, a witness who said the raid was planned in a KKK meeting but who was not present at the raid itself.
- Superior Court Judge Willis, presiding over the case in the absence of Judge Houser.
- Los Angeles County District Attorney Thomas L. Woolwine
- Arthur B. Yorba, clerk of the trial court.

== Chronology ==
=== Planning the raid ===
Modern Inglewood within Los Angeles County

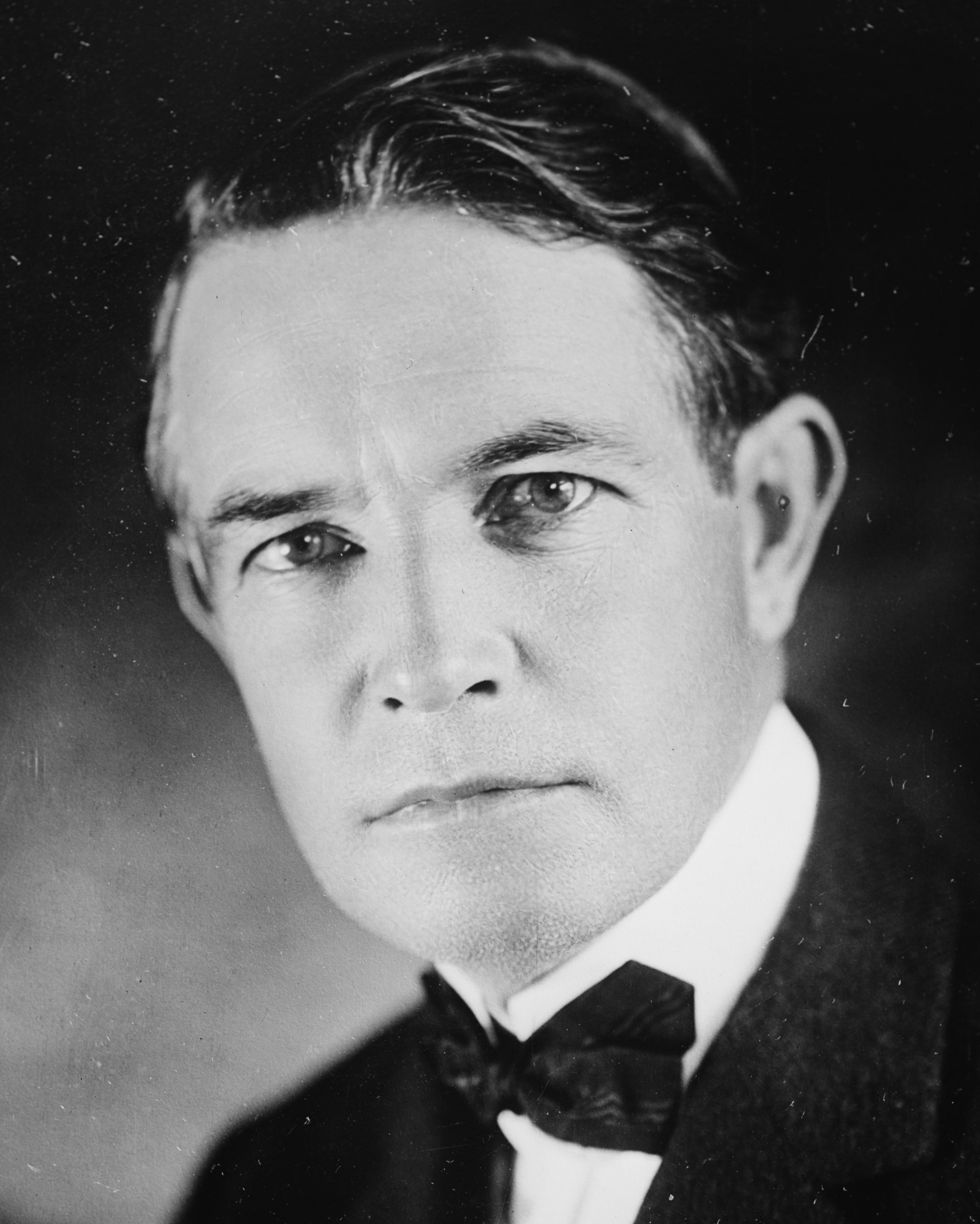
Thomas Lee Woolwine, lawyer and politician, District Attorney of Los Angeles County between 1914 and 1923

Police officer Shambeau told a coroner's jury that he had talked with some of Inglewood's leading citizens about the prospective raid several days before the event. Ku Klux Klan official N.A. Baker was in charge of a planning meeting held in the Beaver funeral home on Friday, April 21, 1922, where the meeting started with prayer and then several people took an oath of fealty to the Klan, including Shambeau. It was later said that the Elduayen family were bootleggers who had sold liquor causing the death of one man and the blinding of another. A Los Angeles Examiner reporter testified at a coroner's inquest that the assemblage was told that there was to be "no tar and feathers," by order of "the big boss." Shambeau testified at the trial that the raiders "did not have enough robes to go around" for the raid on some "Mexican's place where rotten booze was made," that Baker ordered white handkerchiefs to be used on automobile radiator caps as identification and that handkerchiefs were also to be used as masks.

=== The raid ===
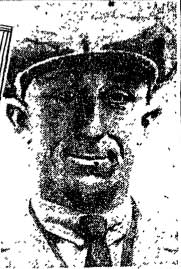
Blake E. Shambeau Los Angeles Times photo

The next evening, Saturday, April 22, 1922, a group of 20 to 25 men from Inglewood, Huntington Park, Los Angeles, Venice, and Redondo Beach assembled at the Titan Garage in Inglewood. They included H.B. Beaver, H.A. Wait, Thomas Jennings and Dr. Ed Campbell, according to Shambeau's testimony. They went to Pine Avenue, where they helped make up a band of 50 to 200 men (the estimates varied), most of them masked, who were gathered near the home of Fidel and Angela Elduayen, their children, Bernarda, 13, and Mary, 15, and Fidel's brother, Mathias. Some entered the house, and others remained in the yard, occupied a barn or guarded the roads. Fidel Elduayen testified to the coroner’s inquest in Spanish that he and Mathias were seized, bound, and threatened with death. They heard shots fired, then they were driven first to the Inglewood jail and then to one in Redondo Beach, where their captors tried to lodge them but were refused by the officials in charge.

In a neighboring house a "Japanese" man, T. Shitara, telephoned Inglewood officials to report the event. His first call, to the "Constable of the town", was unsuccessful. Then he called the City Marshal's office, and Frank Woerner responded aboard a motorcycle that was piloted by a civilian, Clyde Vannatta. Shots were exchanged and one of the Klansmen fell mortally wounded. He was M.B. Mosher, the constable who could not be reached when Shitara called earlier.

Woerner had been driven to the Pine Avenue home from the City Hall by motorcyclist Vannatta; they were greeted by armed men, one of whom, M. B. Mosher, threatened the two with a gun, but Woerner fired first, mortally wounding Mosher and injuring his son, Walter, and another man, Leonard Ruegg.

The two Elduayen girls told reporters and later testified at trial that they were forced to change from their nightgowns with their bedroom door open as the masked men roamed their home. At the first opportunity, they and their mother fled and hid in the alfalfa fields.

=== Coroner's inquest ===
A coroner's inquest was held on Monday, April 25, in the same room in Beaver's combination furniture store and funeral home, where, according to the testimony of participant Shambeau, the Inglewood police officer, the KKK action had been planned just four days before.

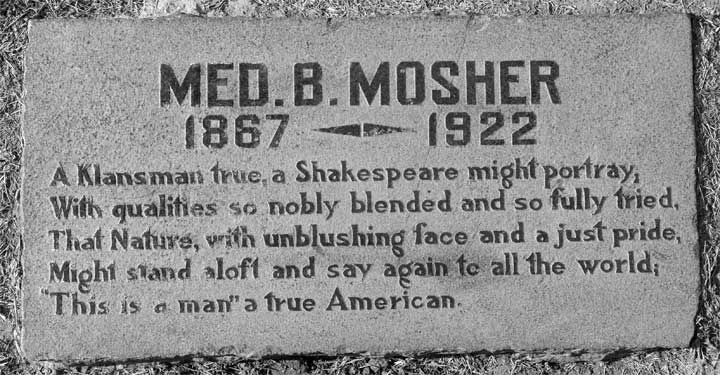
Marker over Medford B. Mosher's grave in Inglewood Park Cemetery

Included in the testimony was that by Grand Goblin William S. Coburn, who said he knew there were no Klansmen present at the Inglewood raid because he walked through the groups gathered in front of the Elduayen home and gave the "Grand Goblin's call" and no one answered.

Coburn testified that if KKK members or applicants for membership conducted the raid, it was "unofficial." Shambeau testified he had attended another meeting the preceding evening at which the raid was planned. In its verdict, the jury found that an "illegal masked and armed mob, presumably instigated and directed by members of the K.K.K.," caused Mosher's death; it demanded action to punish perpetrators of the crime.

Mosher was buried in Inglewood Park Cemetery on April 26.

=== Investigation ===
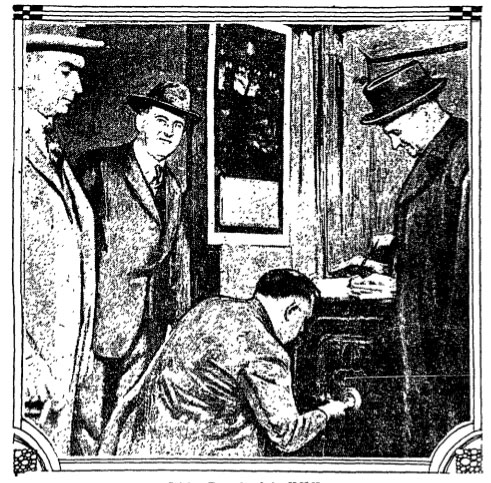
Secretary C.R. Isham of the Los Angeles office of the Ku Klux Klan opens a safe as sheriff's officers and an assistant district attorney stand by. Los Angeles Times photo

On the afternoon of Tuesday, April 26, 1922, in the offices of the Ku Klux Klan in the Haas Building at 7th Street and Broadway, Los Angeles, Grand Goblin Coburn refused to hand over to Undersheriff Eugene Biscailuz and Detective Walter Hunter the roster of Ku Klux Klan members. The two officers left but returned with a search warrant and a demand to open up the safe. Coburn declined. The officers called a locksmith and were prepared to crack the safe when Coburn changed his mind and ordered it opened. Inside were money receipts and correspondence. Elsewhere in the office searchers seized two embroidered Klan robes and a file of names.

=== Indictment ===
After more than a month of hearing 133 witnesses, an 18-person grand jury on June 7 returned an indictment of two counts of false imprisonment of the Elduayen brothers, two counts of kidnapping the same men, and one count of assault with intent to commit the murder of Frank Woerner against each of the 37 defendants. All of them, except Coburn and Price, admitted taking part in the raid. There were six "John Doe" indictments returned against men whose identities might become known later. Documents seized in a raid on the offices of former Grand Goblin Coburn were also submitted. A typewriter used in the Los Angeles Klan office was presented.

During the hearings, defendant Nathan A. Baker was being held at the County Hospital after his arrest on suspicion of felony when Sheriff Traeger and Undersheriff Eugene Biscailuz learned that he planned to escape from California and that he was bordering on a mental and nervous breakdown.

Later, on August 15, it was reported that a document had been stolen during the investigative period from the district attorney's office and found its way to the office of Paul Barksdale D'Orr and A.L. Abrahams, attorneys for most of the defendants. District Attorney Woolwine had wanted to use it as the basis for surprise testimony during the trial.

=== Los Angeles Examiner connection ===
Donald Parker, photographer for the Los Angeles Examiner, who was present during the raid, told the coroner's jury that he had been a member of the Klan for several months but resigned after April 22. R.B. (or R.D.) Knickerbocker, an Examiner reporter, was also present. Parker said he had been "tipped off," possibly by Klan kleagle N.A. Baker, and Knickerbocker said he could not escape from the klansman who was guarding him after he learned of the action that was to take place.

Leaders of the proposed raid, Knickerbocker testified at trial, proposed at the Titan Garage to give him a typewritten statement of what had occurred and then, if he and Parker "behaved right on the story," they would be offered the opportunity to take part in two more activities planned by the Klan: The first would have been a sortie by Klan members, dressed in their robes, to make an ostentatious, public cash donation to a Culver City church, and the second would have been to witness the tar-and-feathering of a prominent Venice businessman accused of "mistreating a girl."

=== Trial ===
Trial of the 37 defendants began on August 7, 1922, with Judge Houser presiding and eight men and four women in the jury box. On August 10, Nathan A. Baker, the acknowledged leader of the April 22 action, collapsed, "crumpled up with a convulsion," during the testimony of 13-year-old Bernarda Elduayen and was taken from the courtroom. His case was later severed from the trial and never continued.

The defense referred to the events of April 22 as the "Inglewood enterprise" and sought to show that officer Frank Woerner shot Mosher without provocation and that the Elduayens were selling liquor; therefore the raid was justified. Defendant Bryson said he had been asked by Kleagle Baker to assist Constable Mosher in the raid and that he, Bryson, deputized some of the men on the way to the Pine Avenue address. He said he had bought whisky, brandy, wine, and gin from the Elduayens before the raid began. The bottles of alcohol were displayed for the jury. Hamilton testified that Charles Casto, one of the defendants, stood guard at the closed bedroom door of the two teenagers, forbidding entry to anyone.

In closing arguments, the prosecution stayed mainly with the facts of the case, and the defense used emotional appeals to sway the jury. Prosecutor Turney "bluntly charged the raiders with being a mob of men who terrorized a mother and two little girls." Defense attorney D'Orr painted a different picture:

Constable Mosher died there defending your children and mine. He died there upholding the majesty of the law. ... Ladies and gentlemen, any man who loved his father, whom he believed was in the lawful execution of his duty, protecting your home and mine against criminality, and who is shot down by a man who had never been assailed, and sees the fire coming toward him and does not reply to that fire and seek to stop the assailant, is unworthy of the name of an American citizen.

=== Verdict ===
After five hours of deliberation — a delay caused by the need to fill out a ballot for each charge for each defendant — the jury returned with a verdict on August 26 of not guilty on all counts. When Judge Houser adjourned court, the defendants rushed forward to shake the hand of the jurors, some of whom said they considered it a "patriotic verdict." Many defendants then entered Houser's chambers and returned with "large supplies" of the judge's campaign literature and posters.

=== Elduayens' arrest ===
Fidel Elduayen, 41, and Mathias, 31, were arrested on August 26, 1922, by federal agents who charged them with violation of the Volstead Act, which regulated the manufacture and sale of liquor in the United States. The charges were dismissed on February 2, 1924.

== Split in Klan ==
On November 5, 1923, William S. Coburn, 53, was killed in his office in Georgia by Philip E. Fox, an editor and publicist for the Klan. The murder was motivated by the Evans-Simmons split in the Klan. Fox said he'd planned to kill all leading members of the rival faction, including William Joseph Simmons, Edward Young Clarke, and Fred E. Johnson. In 1924, Fox was found guilty of murder and sentenced to life in prison, avoiding a death sentence after the jury recommended mercy. He was released on parole in May 1933. Fox later worked as a publicist in political campaigns in Texas, including for W. Lee O'Daniel for U.S. senator and Allan Shivers. When Fox worked as an aide for gubernatorial candidate Beauford H. Jester, rival candidate Homer P. Rainey focused on Fox's past and murder conviction in an unsuccessful attempt to derail Jester's campaign. Fox died in Texas on December 27, 1959, at the age of 71.

On September 8, 1924, it was reported that more than 25 percent of the Inglewood Klan unit — named the Med Mosher Klan No. 1 — had left the national organization and formed a group called the Reformed Order of Klansmen. Spokesmen Lloyd S. Sanderson and A.H. Van de Mark accused the national body of despotism, graft and un-Americanism.

Affidavits dealing with the split were filed in Superior Court on November 7, 1924, by Ray Mears of Ocean Park and Earnest M. Schultz of Venice, both former defendants in the Elduayen trial, stating, among other claims, that G. W. Price, also a defendant, had been present on the Elduayen property and had given orders to "go home and keep our mouths shut about what happened."

On February 20, 1925, it was reported that the "Ku Klux Klan element" in Inglewood was supporting the recall of five city trustees (council members) in an attack on Street Superintendent O.O. Farmer "because of the employment in his office and field force of men who are not yet American citizens."

By 1931, an Inglewood Klan unit was known as "Loyalty Klan No. 25"; it sent a communication to the county Board of Supervisors seeking an eight-hour day and a five-day work week in public jobs, as well as the elimination of employment of wives, daughters, and sons of public officials in those positions.

== See also ==
- History of the Ku Klux Klan in New Jersey
- Indiana Klan
- Tulsa race massacre

People

- J.C. Barthel, Los Angeles City Council member questioned by a grand jury investigating the Klan
