= William C. Doran =

American judge

The Honorable William C. Doran
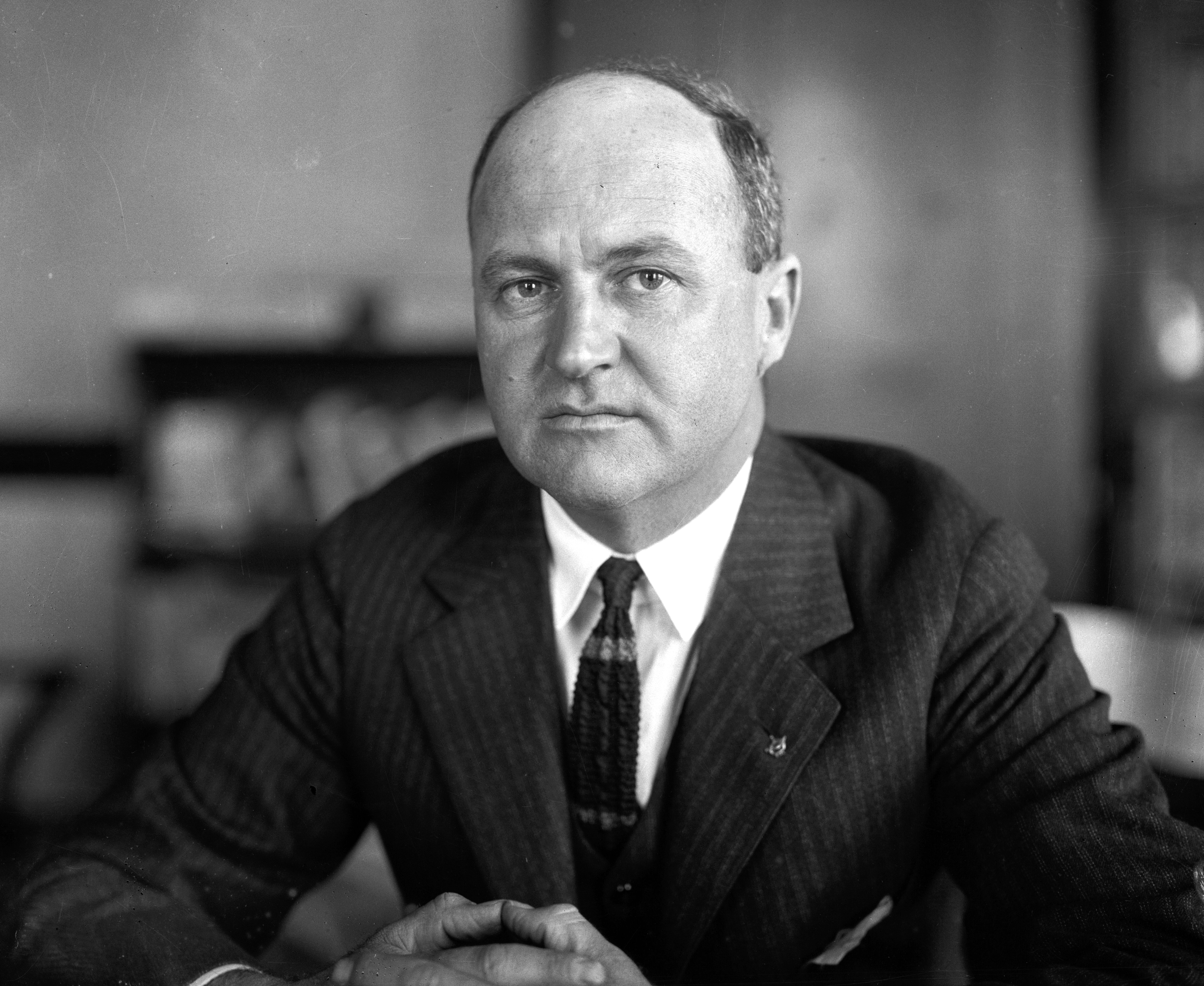
- William C. Doran in the late 1920s

Associate Justice of the California Court of Appeal, Second District, Division 1
- In office October 14, 1935 – 1958
- Appointed by: Frank Merriam

Personal details
- Born: William C. Doran; December 21, 1884 Cincinnati, Ohio, U.S.
- Died: January 23, 1965 (aged 80) Los Angeles, California, U.S.
- Spouse: Juanita Doran
- Children: 2
- Education: University of Southern California Law School
- Occupation: Jurist

William C. Doran (December 21, 1884 – January 23, 1965) was an associate justice of the California Court of Appeal, Second Appellate District, Division 1, from October 14, 1935, until 1958.

== Biography ==
Born in Cincinnati, Ohio, Doran moved to California at the age of 12. He received his law degree from the University of Southern California Law School in 1907 and was admitted to the bar in July of that year. He was a deputy district attorney in Los Angeles County from 1910 to 1917 and chief deputy from 1917 to 1923. In 1921, Doran assisted with the prosecution of Fatty Arbuckle for the rape and murder of Virginia Rappe. Doran also played a key role in the Ku Klux Klan raid in Inglewood, California, that precipitated the outlawing of the Klan in the state.

In 1923, Doran was made a judge of the Los Angeles County Superior Court, a position he held from January 2, 1923 to October 13, 1935. In 1935, Doran was elevated by Governor Frank Merriam to a seat on the California District Court of Appeal.

== Personal life and death ==
Doran and his wife, Juanita, had two sons, William E. and John (nicknamed Jack). Doran died at his home in Los Angeles, California, at the age of 80, having experienced a lengthy period of disability due to a series of strokes. Following his death, Doran's estate was estimated to be worth $500,000.

== See also ==
- Ku Klux Klan in Inglewood, California
