= Detroit, Kansas =

Unincorporated community in Dickinson County, Kansas

- Unincorporated community and CDP
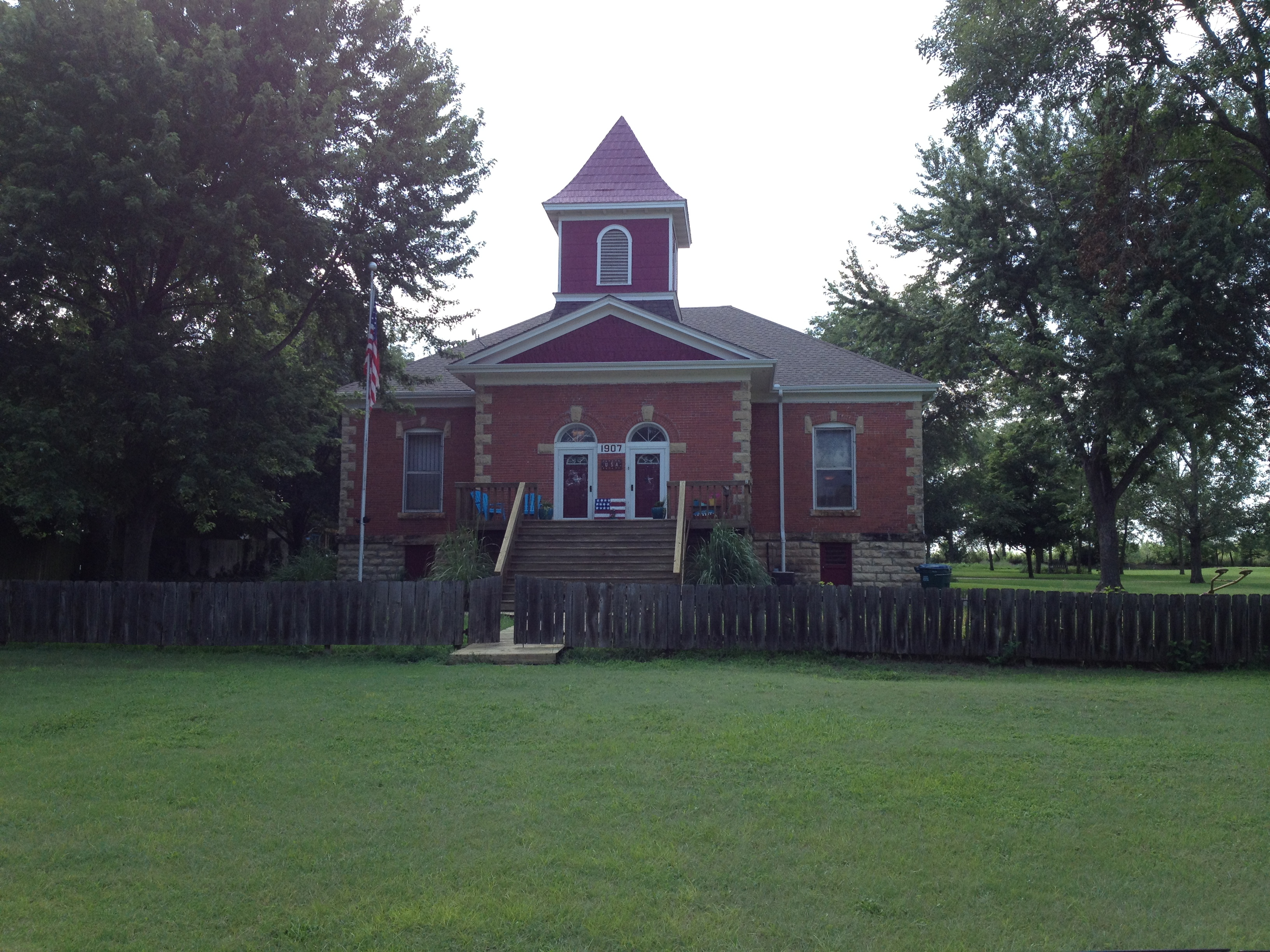
- Old Detroit school house (2013)

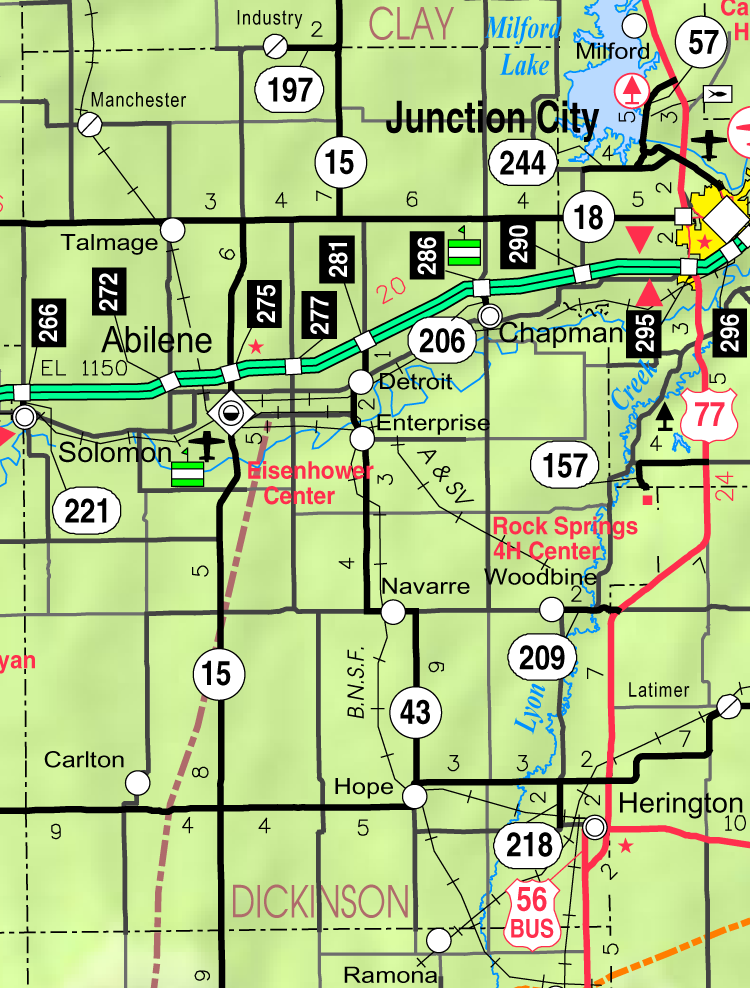
- KDOT map of Dickinson County (legend)

- Location within Kansas Location within the United States
- Coordinates: 38°56′10″N 97°07′36″W
- Country: United States
- State: Kansas
- County: Dickinson
- Named for: Detroit

Area
  - Total: 0.34 sq mi (0.89 km^{2})
  - Land: 0.34 sq mi (0.89 km^{2})
  - Water: 0 sq mi (0.0 km^{2})
- Elevation: 1,194 ft (364 m)

Population (2020)
  - Total: 102
  - Density: 300/sq mi (110/km^{2})
- Time zone: UTC-6 (CST)
  - Summer (DST): UTC-5 (CDT)
- Area code: 785
- FIPS code: 20-17875
- GNIS ID: 2583498

Detroit is an unincorporated community and census-designated place (CDP) in Dickinson County, Kansas, United States. As of the 2020 census, the population was 102.

== History ==
The community was named after Detroit, Michigan. In the early years of the county, Detroit was once strongly considered to be the county seat because Abilene was considered to be "too wild" of a town to serve as a center of government. However, Abilene became the county seat and Detroit ceased to grow from that point forward.

A post office was opened in Detroit in 1866, and remained in operation until it was discontinued in 1961.

Detroit was a station on the Union Pacific Railroad.

== Geography ==
Detroit is located halfway between Abilene and Chapman, 2 miles (3 km) north of Enterprise. The town is at an elevation of 1,147 feet (350 m) above sea level.

Detroit is a "square" town, two blocks long and two blocks wide. The three north–south streets are Main, Middle, and School. The three east–west streets are First, Second, and Third. There are no more streets in Detroit. All six streets are unpaved.

== Demographics ==
Historical population
Census	Pop.	Note	%±
2010	114		—
2020	102		−10.5%
U.S. Decennial Census

== Economics ==
At one time Detroit maintained an active store and grocery, a train depot, a nightclub, a school and a church. In recent years most buildings have collapsed or been renovated for use as a dwelling. The one exception is the pub. Although it has changed ownership and its official business name, locals have simply referred to it as "The Midway" or "The Beer Joint". Because of its proximity to the intersection of county roads, it has become a local landmark.

In 1898, a newspaper titled The Detroit Free Press attempted to build circulation. Records are not found past the first year of 1898. It does not appear to have any connection to the Detroit Free Press published in Detroit, Michigan.

Agriculture and agriculture-related businesses are the primary economic industries.

The United States Post Office operated a branch in Detroit that opened on April 6, 1866, and ceased operation on June 23, 1961.

== Education ==
The community is served by Chapman USD 473 public school district.

== Gallery ==
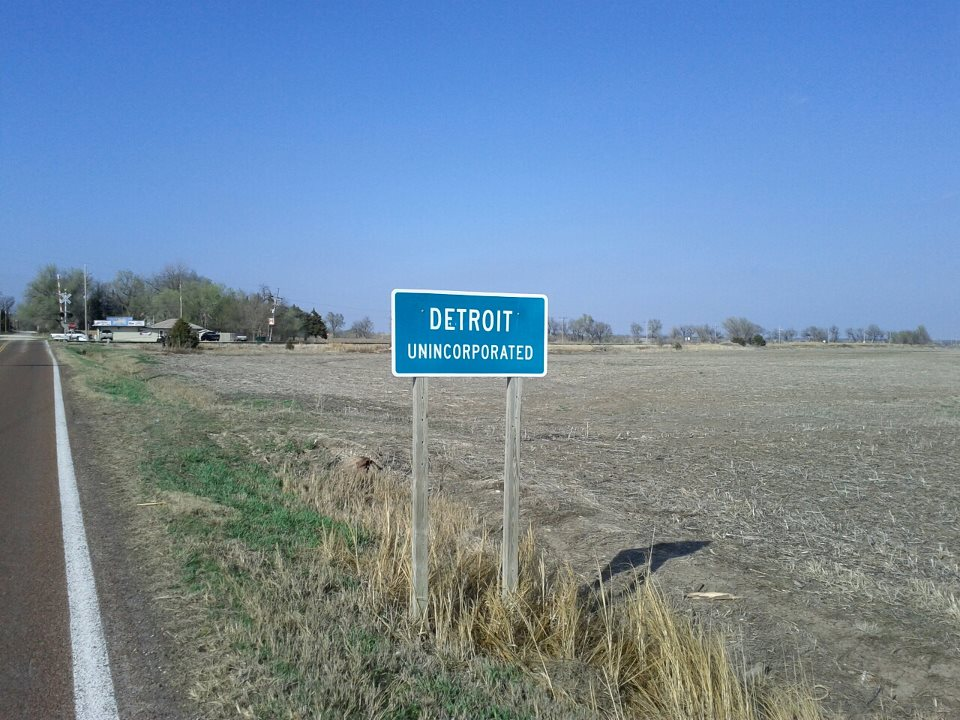
Detroit from the south, viewed from State Highway K-43

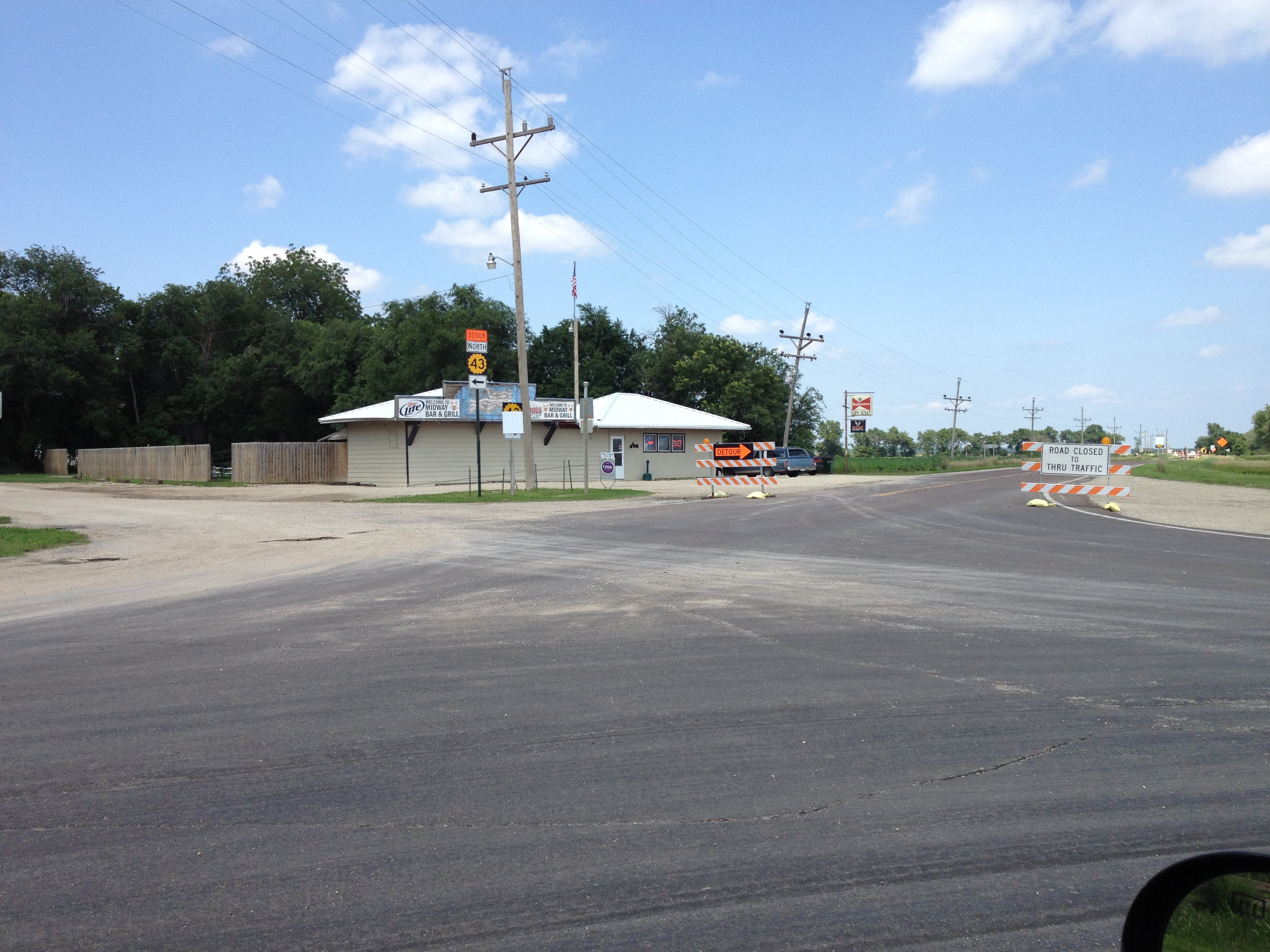
"The Beer Joint" or "The Midway"
