= Talmage, Kansas =

Unincorporated community in Dickinson County, Kansas

- Unincorporated community and CDP
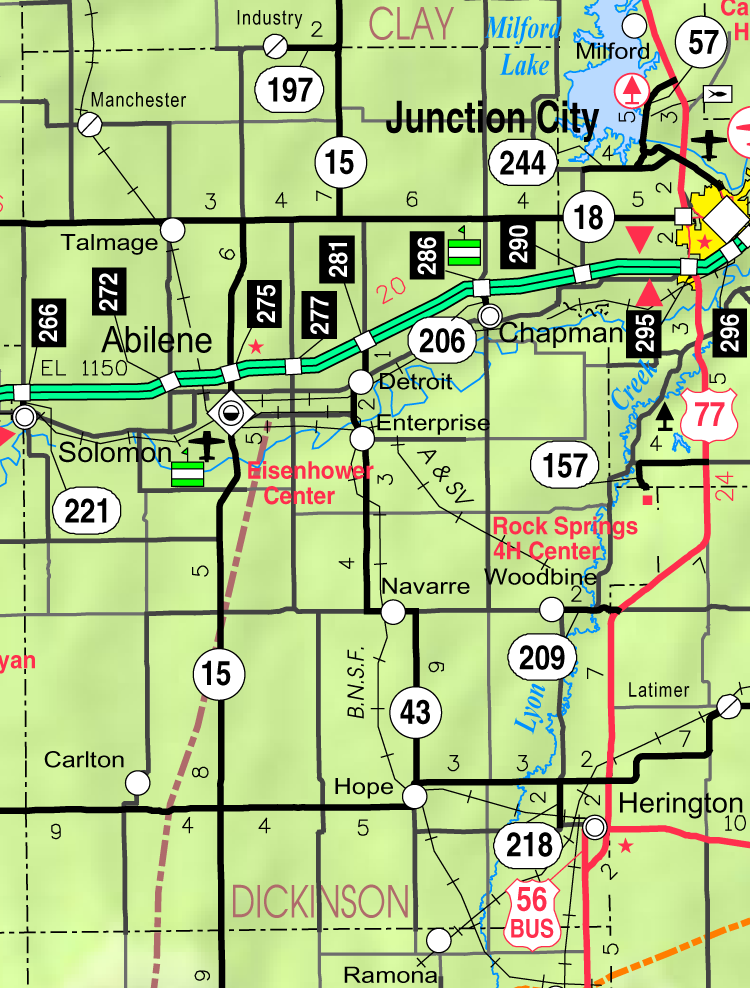
- KDOT map of Dickinson County (legend)

- Location within Kansas Location within the United States
- Coordinates: 39°1′30″N 97°15′38″W
- Country: United States
- State: Kansas
- County: Dickinson

Area
  - Total: 0.097 sq mi (0.25 km^{2})
  - Land: 0.097 sq mi (0.25 km^{2})
  - Water: 0 sq mi (0.0 km^{2})
- Elevation: 1,211 ft (369 m)

Population (2020)
  - Total: 78
  - Density: 810/sq mi (310/km^{2})
- Time zone: UTC-6 (CST)
  - Summer (DST): UTC-5 (CDT)
- Area code: 785
- FIPS code: 20-69925
- GNIS ID: 476481

Talmage is an unincorporated community and census-designated place (CDP) in Dickinson County, Kansas, United States. As of the 2020 census, the population was 78.

== History ==
In 1887, the Atchison, Topeka and Santa Fe Railway (ATSF) built a branch line from Neva (three miles west of Strong City) through Talmage to Superior, Nebraska. In 1996, the ATSF merged with the Burlington Northern Railroad, forming the current BNSF Railway. Most locals still refer to this railroad as the "Santa Fe".

The post office was established on December 22, 1887.

== Geography ==
Talmage is located in northwestern Dickinson County, just south of state highway K-18 in the valley of Mud Creek. Via K-18 and K-15, the county seat of Abilene is 11 miles (18 km) to the southeast. According to the U.S. Census Bureau, Talmage has an area of 0.10 square miles (0.25 km^{2}), all land.

== Demographics ==
Historical population
Census	Pop.	Note	%±
2010	99		—
2020	78		−21.2%
U.S. Decennial Census

== Education ==
The community is served by Abilene USD 435 public school district.
