= Enterprise, Kansas =

City in Dickinson County, Kansas

- City
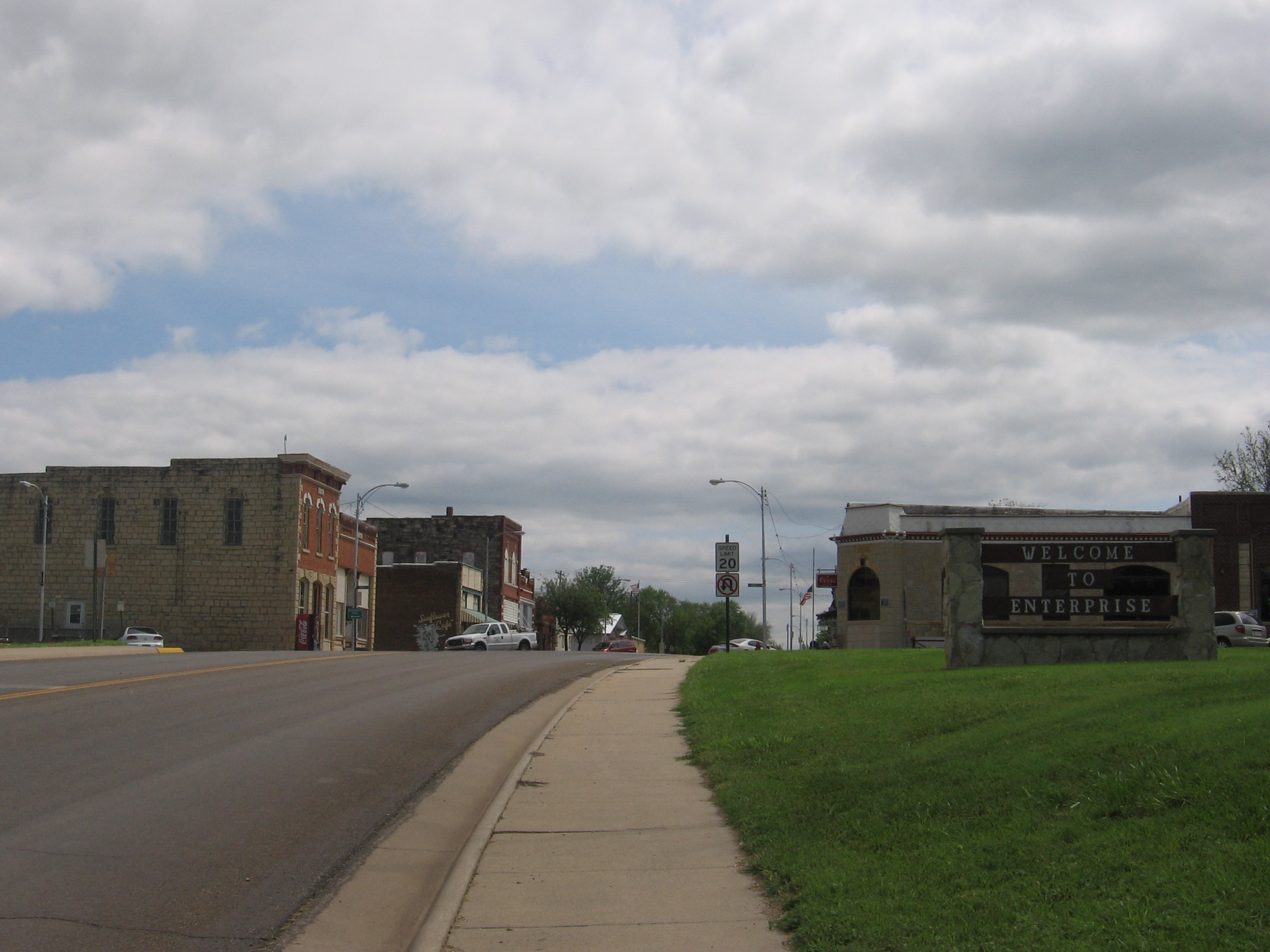
- Northern end of Enterprise (2007)

- Location within Dickinson County and Kansas

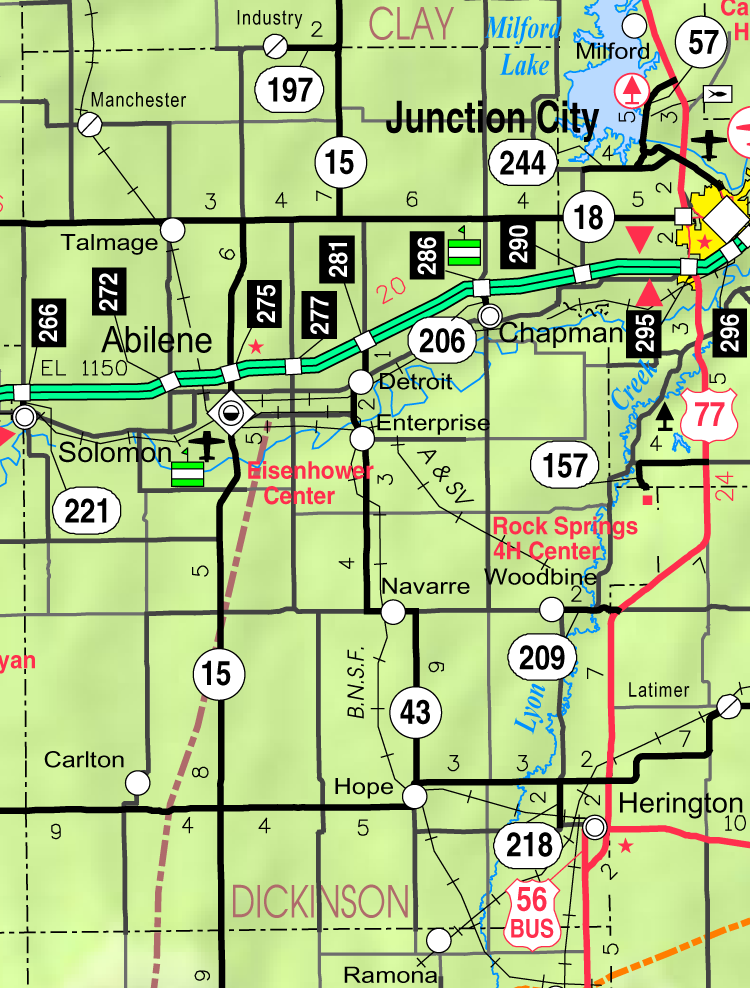
- KDOT map of Dickinson County (legend)
- Coordinates: 38°54′11″N 97°07′00″W
- Country: United States
- State: Kansas
- County: Dickinson
- Founded: 1868
- Platted: 1872

Government
  - Type: Mayor–Council

Area
  - Total: 0.68 sq mi (1.77 km^{2})
  - Land: 0.67 sq mi (1.74 km^{2})
  - Water: 0.012 sq mi (0.03 km^{2})
- Elevation: 1,152 ft (351 m)

Population (2020)
  - Total: 708
  - Density: 1,050/sq mi (407/km^{2})
- Time zone: UTC-6 (CST)
  - Summer (DST): UTC-5 (CDT)
- ZIP Code: 67441
- Area code: 785
- FIPS code: 20-21425
- GNIS ID: 2394695
- Website: enterpriseks.org

Enterprise is a city in Dickinson County, Kansas, United States. As of the 2020 census, the population of the city was 708.

== History ==
The first settlement at Enterprise was in 1868, and Enterprise was laid out in 1872. It was named for the enterprising qualities of the pioneer settlers.

The first post office in Enterprise was established in January 1873.

On January 10, 1883, the Enterprise Town Company, with capital of $50,000, was organized. The following officers were elected: V. P. Wilson, president; John Johntz, vice-president; C. Hoffman, treasurer; T. C. Henry, secretary.

In 1867, the Kansas Pacific Railroad reached Dickinson County, and the KP built a spur to connect Enterprise with the mainline at Detroit, three miles away. In 1886, the Chicago, Rock Island and Pacific Railroad built a tertiary line through Enterprise to connect the Rock Island's main line at Herington to the grain elevators and flour mills in Salina. Today, that track is still in use, owned by the Abilene and Smoky Valley, a heritage railroad that runs excursion trains between Abilene and Enterprise. In 1887, Atchison, Topeka and Santa Fe Railway built a branch line from Neva (three miles west of Strong City) through Enterprise to Superior, Nebraska. In 1996, the Atchison, Topeka and Santa Fe Railway merged with Burlington Northern Railroad and renamed to the current BNSF Railway. Most locals still refer to this railroad as the "Santa Fe".

On January 23, 1901, temperance movement leader Carrie Nation and her followers wrecked a saloon in Enterprise.

== Geography ==
According to the United States Census Bureau, the city has a total area of 0.66 square miles (1.71 km^{2}), of which 0.65 square miles (1.68 km^{2}) is land and 0.01 square miles (0.03 km^{2}) is water.

=== Climate ===
The climate in this area is characterized by hot, humid summers and generally mild to cool winters. According to the Köppen Climate Classification system, Enterprise has a humid subtropical climate, abbreviated "Cfa" on climate maps.

== Demographics ==
Historical population
Census	Pop.	Note	%±
1880	411		—
1890	804		95.6%
1900	798		−0.7%
1910	706		−11.5%
1920	975		38.1%
1930	764		−21.6%
1940	671		−12.2%
1950	795		18.5%
1960	1,015		27.7%
1970	868		−14.5%
1980	839		−3.3%
1990	865		3.1%
2000	836		−3.4%
2010	855		2.3%
2020	708		−17.2%
U.S. Decennial Census

=== 2020 census ===
The 2020 United States census counted 708 people, 271 households, and 188 families in Enterprise. The population density was 1,056.7 per square mile (408.0/km^{2}). There were 316 housing units at an average density of 471.6 per square mile (182.1/km^{2}). The racial makeup was 89.12% (631) white or European American (86.72% non-Hispanic white), 0.0% (0) black or African-American, 0.56% (4) Native American or Alaska Native, 0.28% (2) Asian, 0.14% (1) Pacific Islander or Native Hawaiian, 1.13% (8) from other races, and 8.76% (62) from two or more races. Hispanic or Latino people of any race were 5.23% (37) of the population.

Of the 271 households, 33.9% had children under the age of 18; 49.1% were married couples living together; 21.4% had a female householder with no spouse or partner present. 24.7% of households consisted of individuals and 8.9% had someone living alone who was 65 years of age or older. The average household size was 2.5 and the average family size was 3.1. The percent of those with a bachelor's degree or higher was estimated to be 9.7% of the population.

23.7% of the population was under the age of 18, 7.2% from 18 to 24, 24.3% from 25 to 44, 26.8% from 45 to 64, and 17.9% who were 65 years of age or older. The median age was 40.3 years. For every 100 females, there were 99.4 males. For every 100 females ages 18 and older, there were 100.0 males.

The 2016–2020 5-year American Community Survey estimates show that the median household income was $49,333 (with a margin of error of +/- $13,594) and the median family income was $54,306 (+/- $20,848). Males had a median income of $32,823 (+/- $2,934) versus $15,601 (+/- $2,310) for females. The median income for those above 16 years old was $22,176 (+/- $5,977). Approximately, 13.9% of families and 15.9% of the population were below the poverty line, including 26.1% of those under the age of 18 and 12.3% of those ages 65 or over.

=== 2010 census ===
As of the census of 2010, there were 855 people, 294 households, and 221 families residing in the city. The population density was 1,315.4 inhabitants per square mile (507.9/km^{2}). There were 335 housing units at an average density of 515.4 per square mile (199.0/km^{2}). The racial makeup of the city was 93.3% White, 0.9% African American, 0.4% Native American, 0.4% Asian, 0.1% Pacific Islander, 1.6% from other races, and 3.3% from two or more races. Hispanic or Latino people of any race were 4.1% of the population.

There were 294 households, of which 37.8% had children under the age of 18 living with them, 56.1% were married couples living together, 12.9% had a female householder with no husband present, 6.1% had a male householder with no wife present, and 24.8% were non-families. 22.4% of all households were made up of individuals, and 10.5% had someone living alone who was 65 years of age or older. The average household size was 2.66 and the average family size was 3.03.

The median age in the city was 34.9 years. 28.1% of residents were under the age of 18; 8.3% were between the ages of 18 and 24; 23.1% were from 25 to 44; 23.6% were from 45 to 64; and 16.7% were 65 years of age or older. The gender makeup of the city was 46.7% male and 53.3% female.

=== 2000 census ===
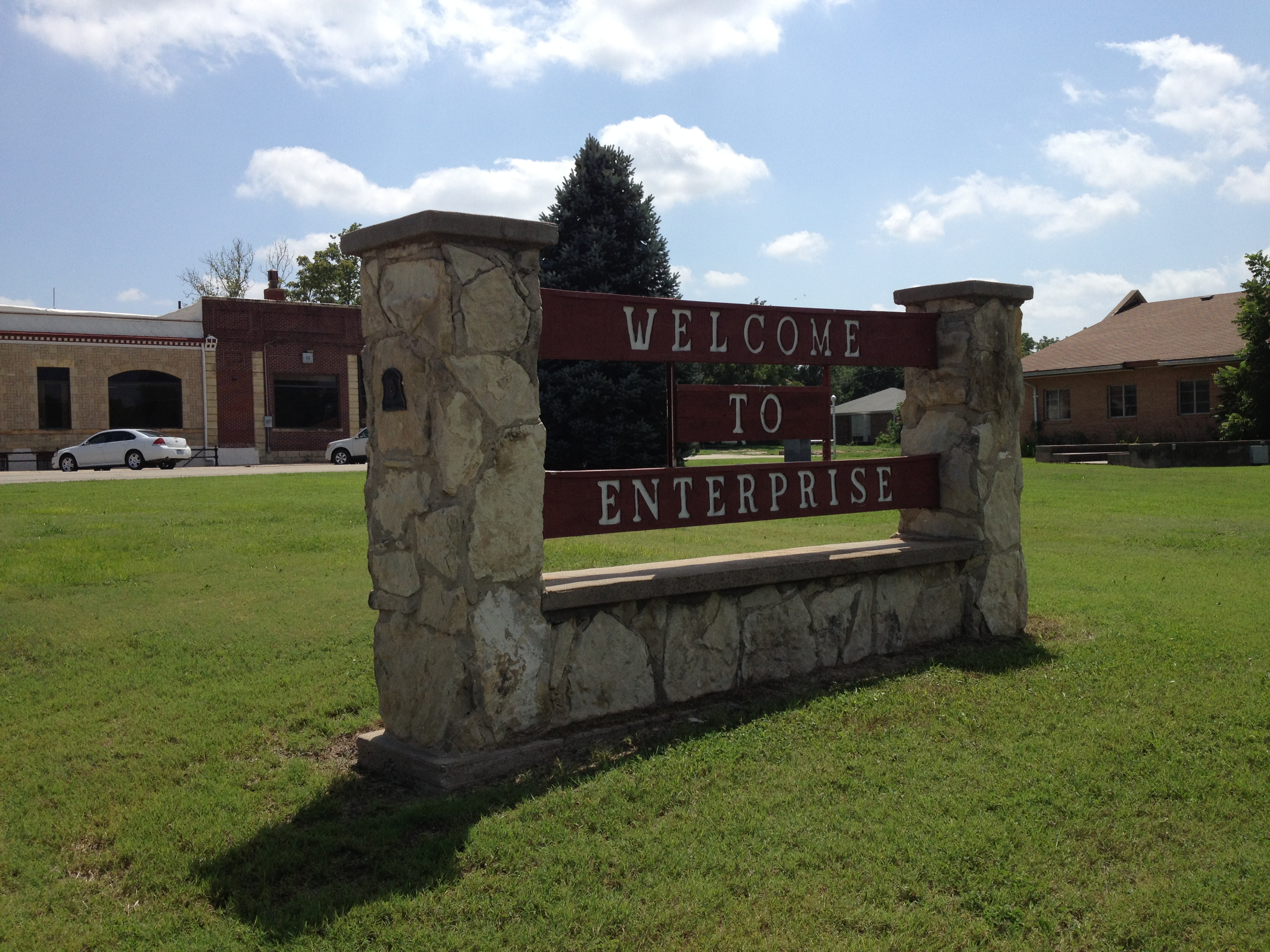

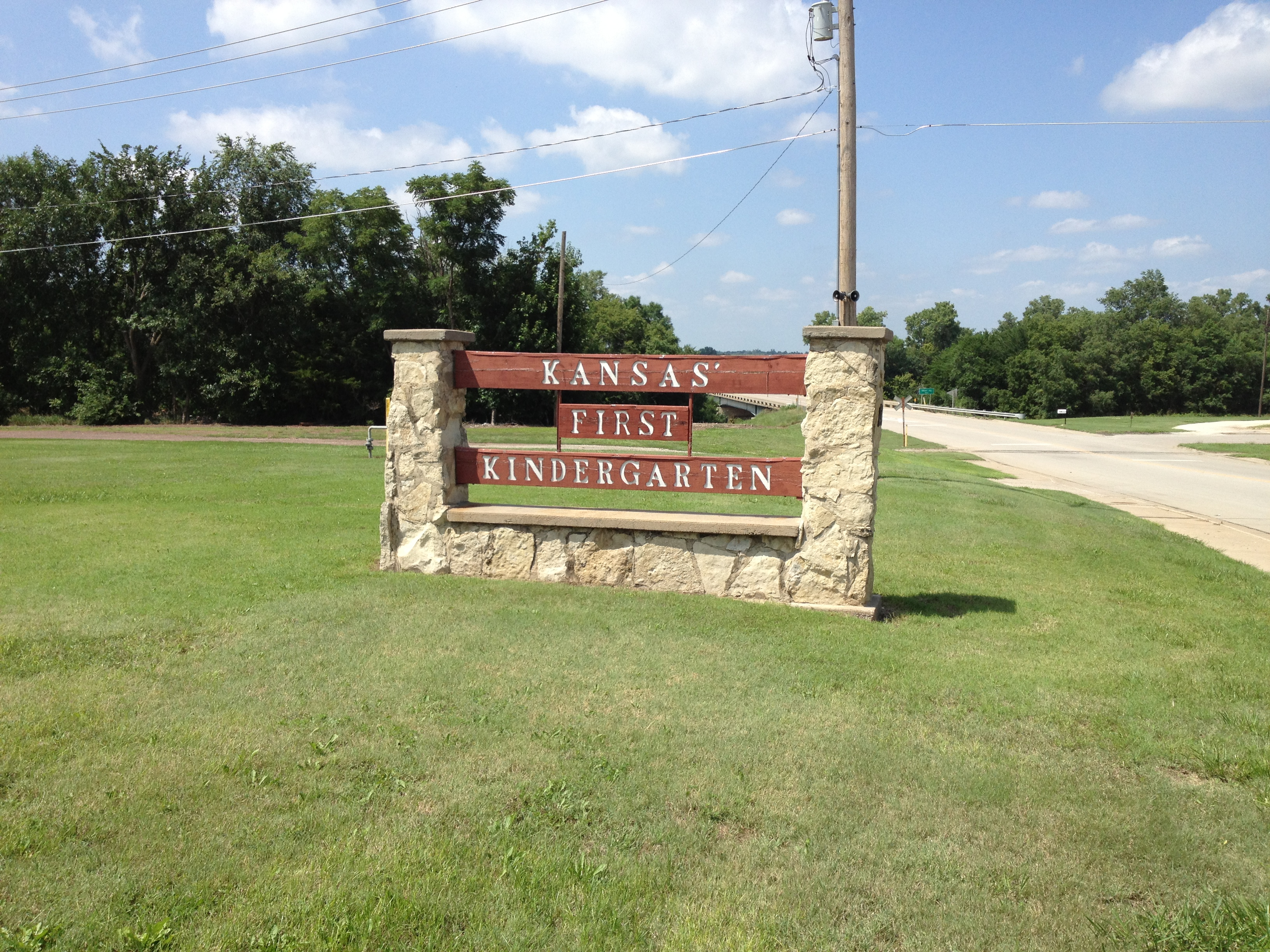

As of the census of 2000, there were 836 people, 299 households, and 218 families residing in the city. The population density was 1,276.4 inhabitants per square mile (492.8/km^{2}). There were 334 housing units at an average density of 509.9 per square mile (196.9/km^{2}). The racial makeup of the city was 96.77% White, 0.24% African American, 0.84% Native American, 0.12% Asian, and 2.03% from two or more races. Hispanic or Latino people of any race were 0.84% of the population.

There were 299 households, out of which 37.1% had children under the age of 18 living with them, 59.5% were married couples living together, 9.7% had a female householder with no husband present, and 26.8% were non-families. 23.7% of all households were made up of individuals, and 12.0% had someone living alone who was 65 years of age or older. The average household size was 2.64 and the average family size was 3.11.

In the city, the population was spread out, with 27.6% under the age of 18, 7.3% from 18 to 24, 23.9% from 25 to 44, 21.5% from 45 to 64, and 19.6% who were 65 years of age or older. The median age was 38 years. For every 100 females, there were 82.1 males. For every 100 females age 18 and over, there were 80.6 males.

As of 2000, the median income for a household in the city was $36,613, and the median income for a family was $39,479. Males had a median income of $28,214 versus $20,357 for females. The per capita income for the city was $15,619. About 7.8% of families and 8.5% of the population were below the poverty line, including 7.0% of those under age 18 and 11.3% of those age 65 or over.

== Education ==
The community is served by Chapman USD 473 public school district. The Chapman High School mascot is Chapman Fighting Irish. Enterprise claims to be the first town to offer kindergarten in the state. Enterprise High School was closed through school unification. The Enterprise High School mascot was Enterprise Bulldogs.

== Transportation ==
The Chicago, Rock Island and Pacific Railroad formerly provided mixed train service to Enterprise on a line between Herington and Salina until at least 1956. As of 2025, the nearest passenger rail station is located in Newton, where Amtrak's Southwest Chief stops once daily on a route from Chicago to Los Angeles.

== See also ==
- Abilene and Smoky Valley Railroad
