= Cody Whitehair =

American football player (born 1992)

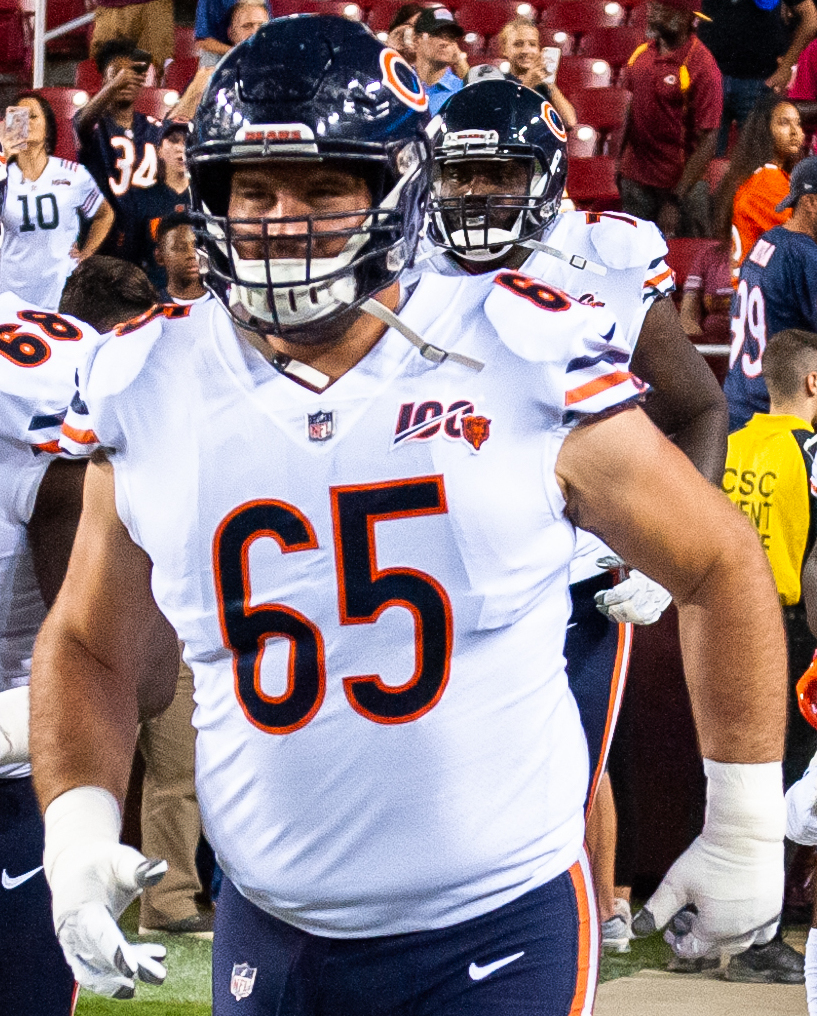
- Whitehair with the Chicago Bears in 2019

No. 65
- Position: Guard

Personal information
- Born: July 11, 1992 (age 34); Kearney, Nebraska, U.S.
- Listed height: 6 ft 3 in (1.91 m)
- Listed weight: 316 lb (143 kg)

Career information
- High school: Abilene (Abilene, Kansas)
- College: Kansas State (2011–2015)
- NFL draft: 2016: 2nd round, 56th overall pick

Career history
- Chicago Bears (2016–2023); Las Vegas Raiders (2024)

Awards and highlights
- Pro Bowl (2018); PFWA All-Rookie Team (2016); First-team All-Big 12 (2015); 2× Second-team All-Big 12 (2013, 2014)

Career NFL statistics
- Games played: 136
- Games started: 121
- Stats at Pro Football Reference

Cody Michael Whitehair (born July 11, 1992) is an American professional football guard. He has previously played for the Chicago Bears. He played college football for the Kansas State Wildcats.

== Early life ==
A native of Abilene, Kansas, Whitehair attended Abilene High School, where he was a two-way lineman for the Cowboys football varsity. In his senior year, he was named to PrepStar magazine's All-Midlands Region team after being credited with 140 pancake blocks and 81 total tackles (41 solo, 40 assisted) with 15 sacks on the season, as Abilene finished 10–1 after losing to Buhler in the second round of the KSHSAA 4A state playoffs.

== College career ==
After redshirting his first year at Kansas State in 2011, Whitehair became a starter at guard in 2012 and 2013. Prior to his junior year in 2014, he moved to offensive tackle, where he started as a junior and senior.

== Professional career ==
Pre-draft measurables
Height	Weight	Arm length	Hand span	40-yard dash	10-yard split	20-yard split	20-yard shuttle	Three-cone drill	Vertical jump	Broad jump	Bench press
6 ft 3 3/4 in (1.92 m)	301 lb (137 kg)	32 3/8 in (0.82 m)	10 1/8 in (0.26 m)	5.08 s	1.73 s	2.95 s	4.58 s	7.32 s	25.5 in (0.65 m)	9 ft 2 in (2.79 m)	16 reps
All values from NFL Combine

=== Chicago Bears ===
Whitehair was selected in the second round, 56th overall by the Chicago Bears in the 2016 NFL draft. After a season-ending injury to 2015 third-round pick Hroniss Grasu in training camp, Whitehair started at left guard during the preseason. Whitehair was then moved to the starting center position after the team signed veteran guard Josh Sitton. He went on to start all 16 games at center and was named to the Pro Football Writers of America All-Rookie Team.

In 2018, Whitehair played every offensive snap and was named to the 2019 Pro Bowl, becoming the first Bears center since Olin Kreutz to play in the Pro Bowl. He was the only Bears player on either side of the ball to participate in every down.

Before the 2019 season, Whitehair moved to left guard, while that position's starter, James Daniels, shifted to center. On September 1, Whitehair signed a five-year contract extension worth $52.5 million with $27.5 million guaranteed. In November, with the offense struggling amid a four-game losing streak, Whitehair returned to center.

Whitehair was placed on the reserve/COVID-19 list by the team on November 6, 2020, and activated on November 16.

In 2022, Whitehair suffered a knee injury in Week 4 and was placed on injured reserve on October 5, 2022. He was activated on November 4.

Whitehair was released from the Chicago Bears on February 15, 2024.

=== Las Vegas Raiders ===
On April 15, 2024, Whitehair signed a one-year deal with the Las Vegas Raiders.
