= Frank D. Parent =

American lawyer

Frank D. Parent was a Los Angeles County municipal court judge between 1930 and 1958. He coached President Dwight D. Eisenhower on championship football and baseball teams at Abilene High School, Kansas, between 1905 and 1909. The Frank D. Parent Elementary School in the Inglewood, California, Unified School District was dedicated to him on May 15, 1960.

Parent was born in Abilene, Kansas, and he attended the University of Kansas, where he was quarterback on a team coached by Fielding H. Yost, which won every game. He was a member of Phi Delta Phi legal fraternity and Beta Theta Pi social fraternity for 60 years.

He was a county attorney in Kansas and co-owner of the Abilene Chronicle before moving to Inglewood in 1910, when he became an owner-partner of the Inglewood Realty Company, 1910–41; first president of the Inglewood Realty Board, 1922–24; charter board member of the Inglewood Chamber of Commerce in 1922; and charter president of the Inglewood Rotary Club in 1930–31. In 1942 he was president of the Inglewood Bar Association.

He was a founder of the Peoples Federal Savings and Loan Association in 1923, shortly after he served on a coroner's jury that found that an "illegal masked and armed mob, presumably instigated and directed by members of the K.K.K.", caused the death of an Inglewood policeman during a 1922 raid by 50 to 200 men on a suspected bootlegger and his family.

Parent was an early supporter of Mines Field, near Inglewood, as a site for a Los Angeles municipal airport, and he persuaded the planners of the National Air Races that the field would be the "best possible landing area" and they chose it for the 1928 event, which solidified public sentiment in favor of the location for the city's first airport.

In 1942 the Inglewood unit of Alcoholics Anonymous chose him as one of the first non-alcoholics to be affiliated with the organization. It described him as "the most humane and understanding judge in Southern California." As chairman of the Chamber of Commerce Aviation Committee, he helped bring Los Angeles International Airport and the first two National Air Races to Inglewood. Between 1950 and 1952 he was honorary chairman for a $2 million drive to establish Daniel Freeman Memorial Hospital.

He died on June 20, 1960.
