= Chapman High School (Kansas) =

Location
- 400 West 4th Street; Chapman, Kansas 67431; United States; 38.971049°N 97.024875°W

Information
- School type: Public, High School
- Established: 2011, 1961, 1889
- School board: Board Website
- School district: Chapman USD 473
- CEEB code: 170520
- Principal: Kevin Suther
- Grades: 9 to 12
- Gender: coed
- Enrollment: 364 (2023-2024)
- Campus type: Rural
- Colors: Green; White
- Athletics: Class 4A; District 15
- Athletics conference: North Central Kansas
- Mascot: Fighting Irish
- Accreditation: Blue Ribbon 2013.
- Website: School Website

Chapman High School is a public secondary school in Chapman, Kansas, United States. It is the sole high school operated by Chapman USD 473 school district. The mascot for CHS athletic teams is the Fighting Irish. Students come to CHS from Chapman Middle School which is fed by elementary schools throughout Dickinson County, Kansas. There are four other districts in Dickinson County

== History ==
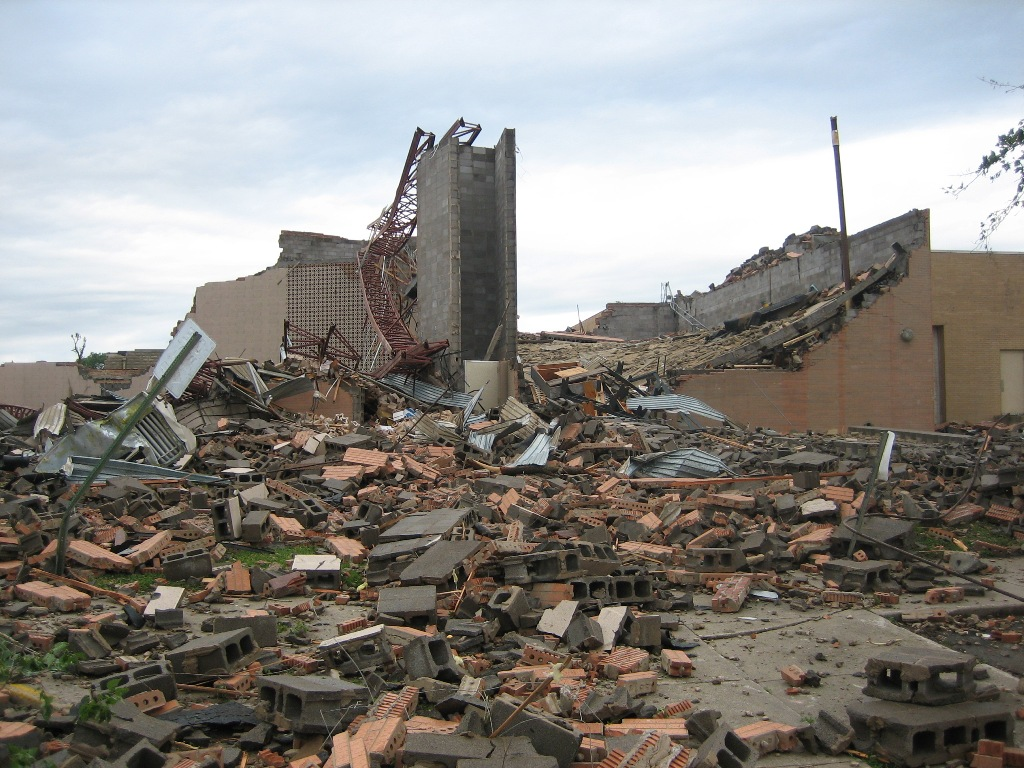
Chapman High School tornado damage, June 2008

Originally named Dickinson County Community High School, the high school was established in 1889 as the nation's first county high school.

In 1961, a second high school was completed, which replaced the 1880s school. In 1966, USD 473 was created by the merging of 11 grade schools and this high school. There were 105 teachers and 1,736 students in the district. At this time, the school was renamed Chapman High School with 530 students.

On June 11, 2008 at 10:22 Wednesday night, a massive tornado ripped through Chapman. It caused extensive damage to all of the USD 473 public schools in addition to damaging or destroying 60-80% of the homes in Chapman. About 80% of the structured High School sustained some form of damage with numerous structures being destroyed. Two months after the tornado devastated Chapman, the 2008-2009 school year began without delay.

In 2011, the third high school building was completed, which replaced the 1961 school that was damaged by the tornado.

In 2011, the University of Notre Dame contacted the high school because the illegal use of its registered trademark and the "Fighting Irish" logo. Chapman High School has used the "Fighting Irish" logo since 1967. Its publications are called the "Emerald" and "Shamrock", the four-leaf clover is distinct on the school's website, it has a Fighting Irish library, and the Fighting Leprechaun mascot was put on the sign in front the school. Notre Dame requested that Chapman High School limited its use of the "leprechaun" and require the text "Chapman High School" included on all items that it sells. The district launched a contest to design a new mascot and logo. A committee determined the top five suggestions which were put to a vote in January 2012. The school voted to retain the fighting Irish mascot, although a new logo was announced and unveiled on February 10, 2012.

== Academics ==
In 2013, Chapman High School was selected as a Blue Ribbon School. The Blue Ribbon Award recognizes public and private schools which perform at high levels or have made significant academic improvements. In addition, principal Suther was awarded the Terrel Bell Award.

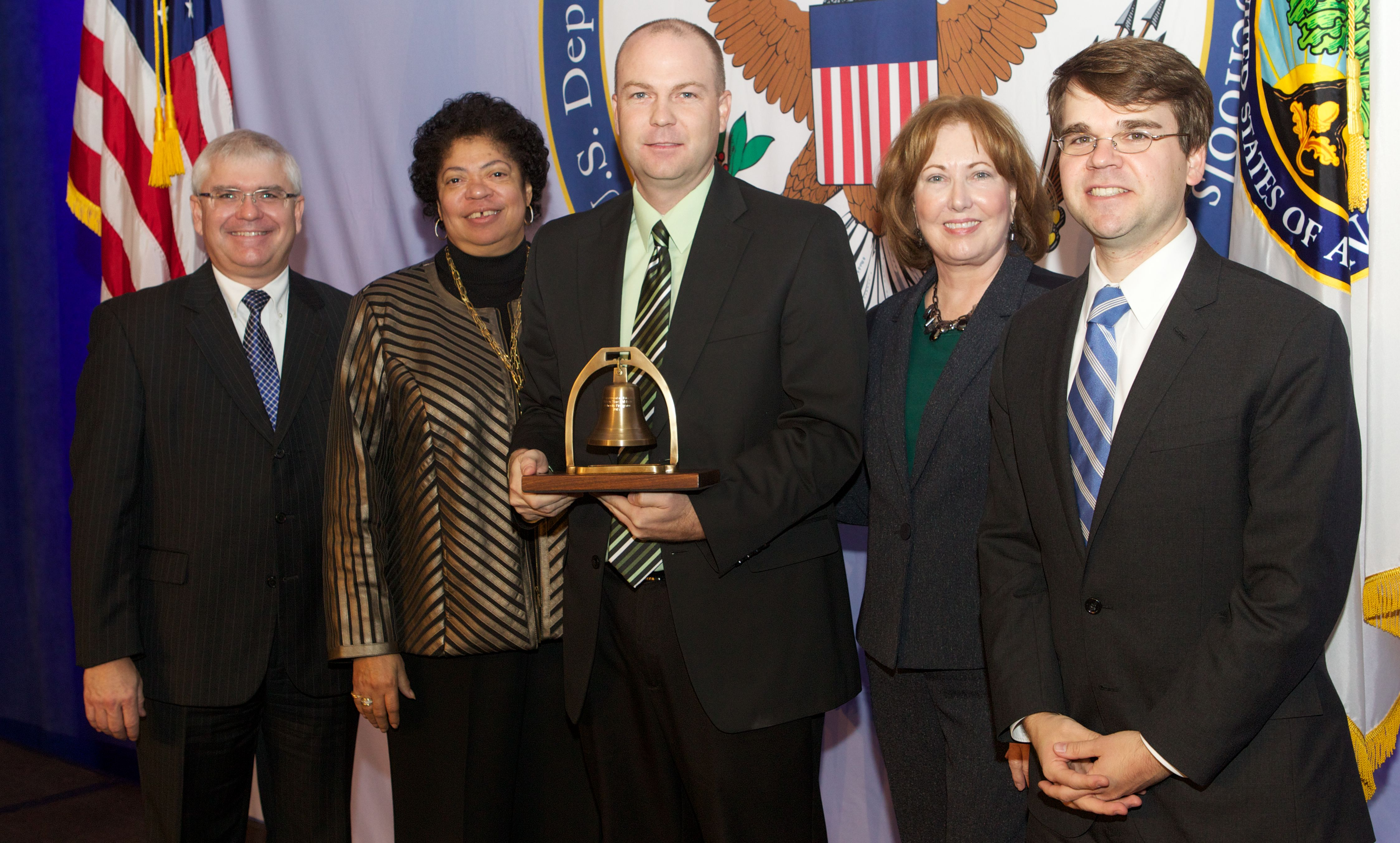
2013 principal Suther was awarded the Terrel Bell Award.

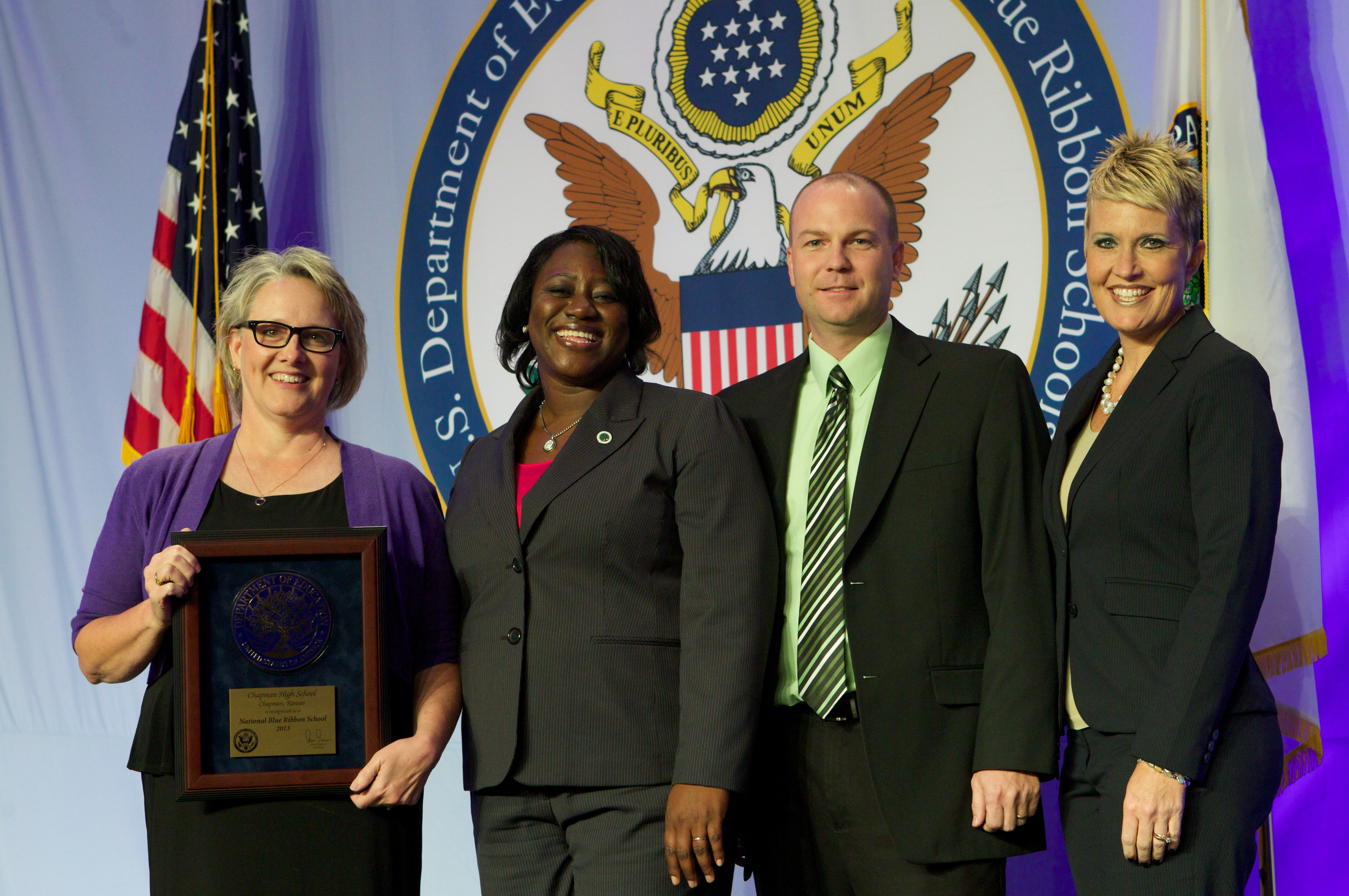
2013 National Blue Ribbon Schools Winner

== Activities ==
Chapman High School has an extensive fine arts program involving drama and music. The drama department offers several theatrical productions every school year as well as a competitive Forensics team that travels to festivals throughout the state.

The music department provides opportunities for students in vocal as well as instrumental music. In addition to many concerts and performances throughout the year the department also produces an annual event for seniors to showcase their talents at Class Night. This CHS tradition began in 1926 and has grown from a simple senior night get together to the production it is today. In the summer of the year 2017 the Chapman Irish Marching Band will be marching in the independence day parade in Washington D.C the Chapman Irish Marching Band was the only marching in the state of Kansas to be nominated to represent the state of Kansas.

Ten recognized student organizations are currently chartered at CHS. These include AFG, AFS Intercultural Programs, Future Farmers of America, FCCLA, Hi-Y, National Honor Society, SADD, Student Council, FBLA Future Business Leaders of America, and Tri-M Music Honor Society. The National Hi-Y Organization can trace its roots back to Chapman as the first ever Hi-Y charter was granted to DCCHS.

The chapter of the Future Farmers of America has been recognized at the state and national levels, holding the record for the most wins of the Bob Garlow Triple Crown award, which is given to the top FFA chapter in the state of Kansas.

== Athletics ==
Chapman High School offers 15 teams that compete in 11 sports. Chapman is classified as a 4A school and competes in the North Central Kansas League (NCKL) since 1966.

The Chapman football team and its rival Abilene High School share a special distinction as being the oldest high school rivalry west of the Mississippi River. The two teams first competed against each other in 1892. Since joining the NCKL in 1966, the Chapman Football team has won 10 league championships, with 7 of those being outright championships. During that time, only Marysville has had more championships than Chapman. Marysville can boast 15 league championships with 10 being outright. Coach NeVoy Hettenbach was at the helm for 6 of the Chapman's league championships. Since 1966, only one NCKL coach has more league championships than Coach Hettenbach.

=== Fall ===
- Football
- Cross Country
- Girls Tennis
- Volleyball
- Spirit Squad
- Marching Band

=== Winter ===
- Basketball
- Wrestling
- Pep Band
- Scholars Bowl

=== Spring ===
- Baseball
- Golf
- Boys Tennis
- Softball
- Track and Field

=== NCKL Football Championships ===
Year	League Record	Overall Record	Head coach
1966*	4-0	5-2-2	NeVoy Hettenbach
1967*	3-0-1	4-4-1	NeVoy Hettenbach
1969	4-1	7-2	NeVoy Hettenbach
1971*	5-0	8-1	NeVoy Hettenbach
1972*	4-0	8-2	NeVoy Hettenbach
1973*	4-0	7-2	NeVoy Hettenbach
1992*	6-0	11-1	Rick Erickson
2005*	5-0	10-2	Tom Smith
2006	4-1	9-2	Tom Smith
2007	3-2	7-3	Tom Smith
* indicates outright NCKL championships

=== State championships ===
Chapman High School have won a total 5 of state championships. In addition, the school has produced 3 individual state champions in wrestling (1993, 2015, 2016), one individual state champion in girls tennis, and 26 individual champions in track and field.

=== State championships ===
State Championships
Season	Sport	Number of Championships	Year
Winter	Boys Basketball	3	1961, 1965, 1972
Spring	Track And Field, Boys	2	1990, 1992
Total		5	

== Notable alumni ==
- Joseph Henry Engle - Space Shuttle Astronaut

== See also ==
- Tornadoes of 2008
- List of high schools in Kansas
- List of unified school districts in Kansas
