= Abilene High School (Kansas) =

Location
- 1300 North Cedar Street; Abilene, Kansas 67410; United States; 38°55′45″N 97°13′3″W

Information
- School type: Public, High School
- School district: Abilene USD 435
- CEEB code: 170005
- Principal: Benjamin Smith
- Teaching staff: 41.27 (FTE)
- Grades: 9–12
- Gender: coed
- Enrollment: 443 (2024–2025)
- Student to teacher ratio: 10.73
- Colors: Orange; Brown
- Song: The Orange and Brown
- Fight song: Go Northwestern Go
- Athletics: Class 4A Div.1; District 15
- Athletics conference: North Central Kansas
- Mascot: Cowboys / Cowgirls
- Rivals: Chapman
- Website: www.abileneschools.org/o/ahs

Abilene High School is a public secondary school in Abilene, Kansas, United States, serving grades 9–12. The school is operated by Abilene USD 435 school district. The current building serves students from the city itself as well as outlying areas covered by the nearby Chapman district.

Abilene is a member of the Kansas State High School Activities Association and offers a variety of sports programs. Athletic teams compete in class 4A. Extracurricular activities are also offered in the form of performing arts, school publications, and clubs.

== Extracurricular activities ==
The Cowboys compete in the North Central Kansas League and are classified as a 4A Div. 1 school, the third-largest classification in Kansas according to the Kansas State High School Activities Association. Throughout its history, Abilene has won many state championships in various sports. Graduates have gone on to participate in Division I, Division II, and Division III athletics. The high school also offers music programs, such as band and choir.

=== Athletics ===
Abilene High School participates in multiple sports for both boys and girls in the Fall, Winter, and Spring sports seasons. The boys' teams are collectively referred to as the Cowboys, while the girls are referred to as the Cowgirls. The Cowboys\Cowgirls mascot was chosen as a direct reflection of the history of Abilene as a cattle stop at the end of the Chisholm Trail, and the men who braved the long journey of the old days, and the women who welcomed them at the end of the trail.

=== Football and basketball ===
Since 1966, when AHS joined the North Central Kansas League (NCKL), the football team has won or shared a total of 11 league championships. The team also won two state championships in 1978 and again in 1987. The Cowboys football team and rival Chapman High School share a unique part of high school football history. The two teams first began playing each other competitively in 1892. According to sports records, this makes the rivalry one of the oldest west of the Mississippi River. It is the 8th oldest in the United States.

In the 2024–2025 season Abilene High School boys basketball team achieved a 16–7 record and returned to the Kansas 4A state tournament for the fourth time in the last five seasons.

=== State championships ===
The Abilene Cowboys and Cowgirls have won a total of 30 recognized State Championships

State Championships
Season	Sport	Number of Championships	Year
Fall	Boys' Cross Country	1	1969
Fall	Football	2	1978, 1987
Fall	Girls' Cross Country	2	1985, 2008
Fall	Girls' Tennis	3	1989, 1992, 1993
Winter	Boys' Basketball	1	1992
Winter	Boys' Powerlifting*	3	2004, 2005, 2006
Winter	Girls' Powerlifting*	5	2003, 2004, 2005, 2006, 2007
Winter	Wrestling	4	1998, 1999, 2003, 2017
Spring	Boys' Golf	4	1949, 1963, 1985, 1986
Spring	Boys' Tennis	1	1991
Spring	Track And Field	4	1918, 1919, 1987, 2006
Total		29**	

(*) Indicates sport and its associated championship is not officially sanctioned by KSHSAA
(**) Total number of team championships is 29 if the powerlifting championships are included.

=== Sports offered ===
- Fall
  - Football
  - Volleyball
  - Boys Cross Country
  - Girls Cross Country
  - Girls Tennis
- Winter
  - Boys Basketball
  - Girls Basketball
  - Wrestling
- Spring
  - Baseball
  - Boys Golf
  - Boys Tennis
  - Softball
  - Boys Track and Field
  - Girls Track and Field

== Notable alumni ==
- Dwight D. Eisenhower, 34th President of the United States
- Milton S. Eisenhower, younger brother of Dwight D. Eisenhower. President of Kansas State University, Penn State University, and Johns Hopkins University
- Marlin Fitzwater, former White House Press Secretary
- Ted Power, former MLB pitcher, and current AAA Baseball pitching coach for the Louisville Bats organization
- Mike Racy, Former NCAA VP, Current Commissioner of the Mid-America Intercollegiate Athletic Association
- Oscar Stauffer, founder of Stauffer Communications and namesake of the Kansas State High School Activities Association yearly award for Sportscaster and Sportswriter of the Year
- Frank Wattelet, former NFL football player for the St. Louis Rams and New Orleans Saints
- Cody Whitehair, NFL center and guard for Chicago Bears

== Notable faculty ==
- Henry Cronkite, basketball coach, 1940s
- Frank Parent, athletics coach, 1905–1909

== See also ==
- List of high schools in Kansas
- List of unified school districts in Kansas
